= Giardino Fenologico "Alessandro Marcello" =

Botanical garden in Italy

Coordinates: 45°40′N 12°15′E

The Giardino Fenologico "Alessandro Marcello" is a research botanical garden operated by the Accademia Trevigiana per il Territorio, and located adjacent to the Orto Botanico Conservativo Carlo Spegazzini at viale de Coubertin 15, Treviso, Veneto, Italy. It is open daily.

The garden was established circa 1999 for experimental studies in phenology, and named in honor of Venetian botanist Alessandro Marcello. Its mission is to study the influence of various environmental factors on plant growth. To reduce the number of experimental variables, the garden contains 2-4 identical clones of the species Cornus mas, Cornus sanguinea, Ligustrum vulgare, Robinia pseudoacacia, Salix acutifolia, Salix smithiana, Salix viminalis, and Sambucus nigra.

== See also ==
- List of botanical gardens in Italy
