= Orto Botanico dell'Università di Tor Vergata =

Botanical garden in Rome

- Click on the map for a fullscreen view
- Type: Urban park
- Nearest city: Rome
- Coordinates: 41°51′13″N 12°36′12″E

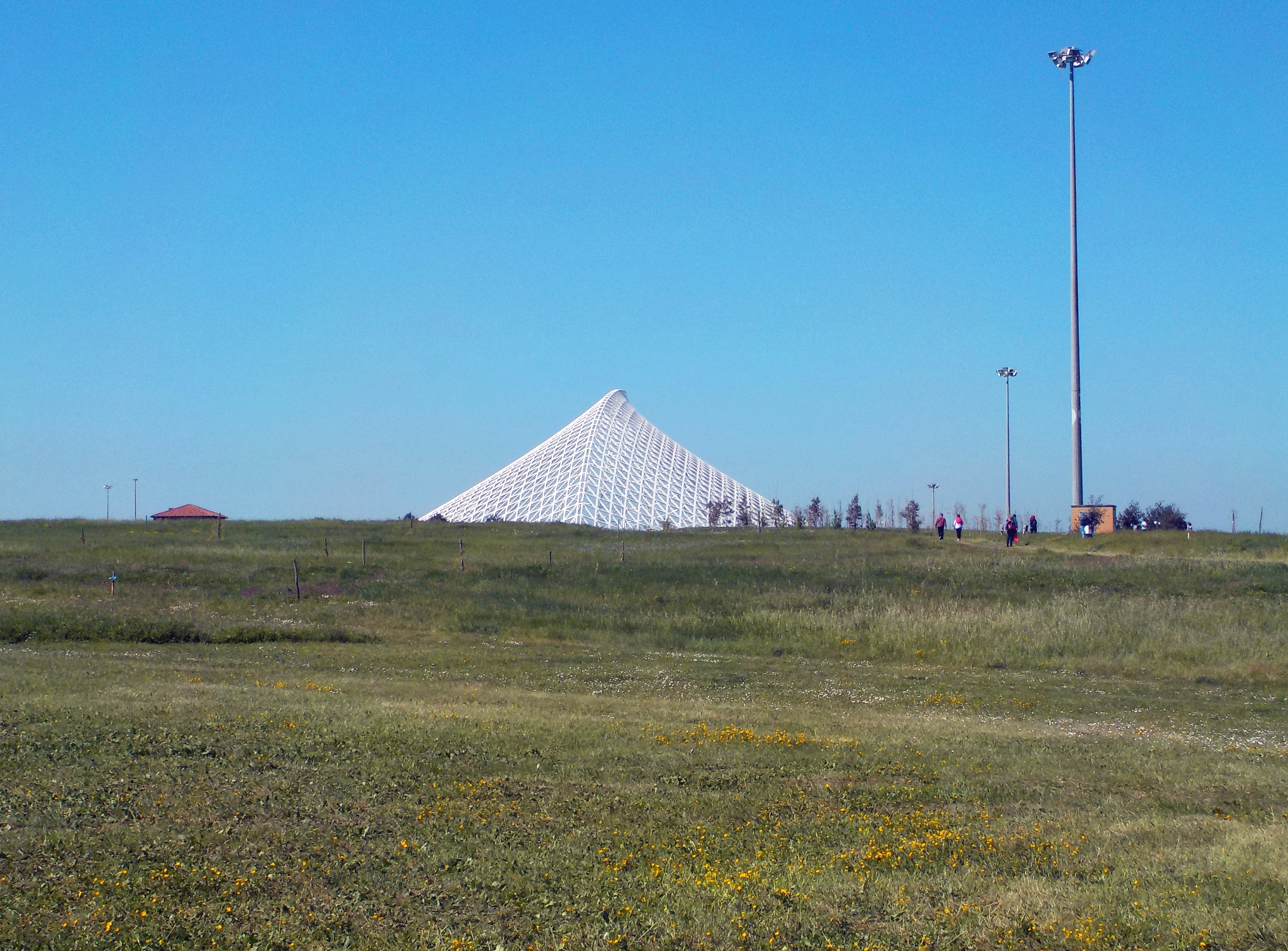

The Orto Botanico dell'Università di Tor Vergata is a botanical garden at the University of Rome Tor Vergata, Rome, Italy. The first part of the collection was established in late 2007 with the biology department Center for Conservation of Germoplasm. Its mission is to preserve genetic biodiversity, and contains advanced equipment for cryopreservation of germoplasm and research in molecular genetics.

== See also ==
- List of botanical gardens in Italy
