= Giardini Ravino =

Italian botanical garden

Coordinates: 40°43′N 13°54′E

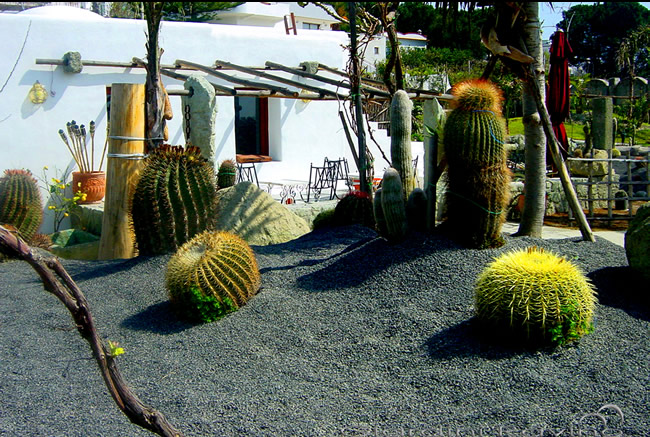
View of the gardens.

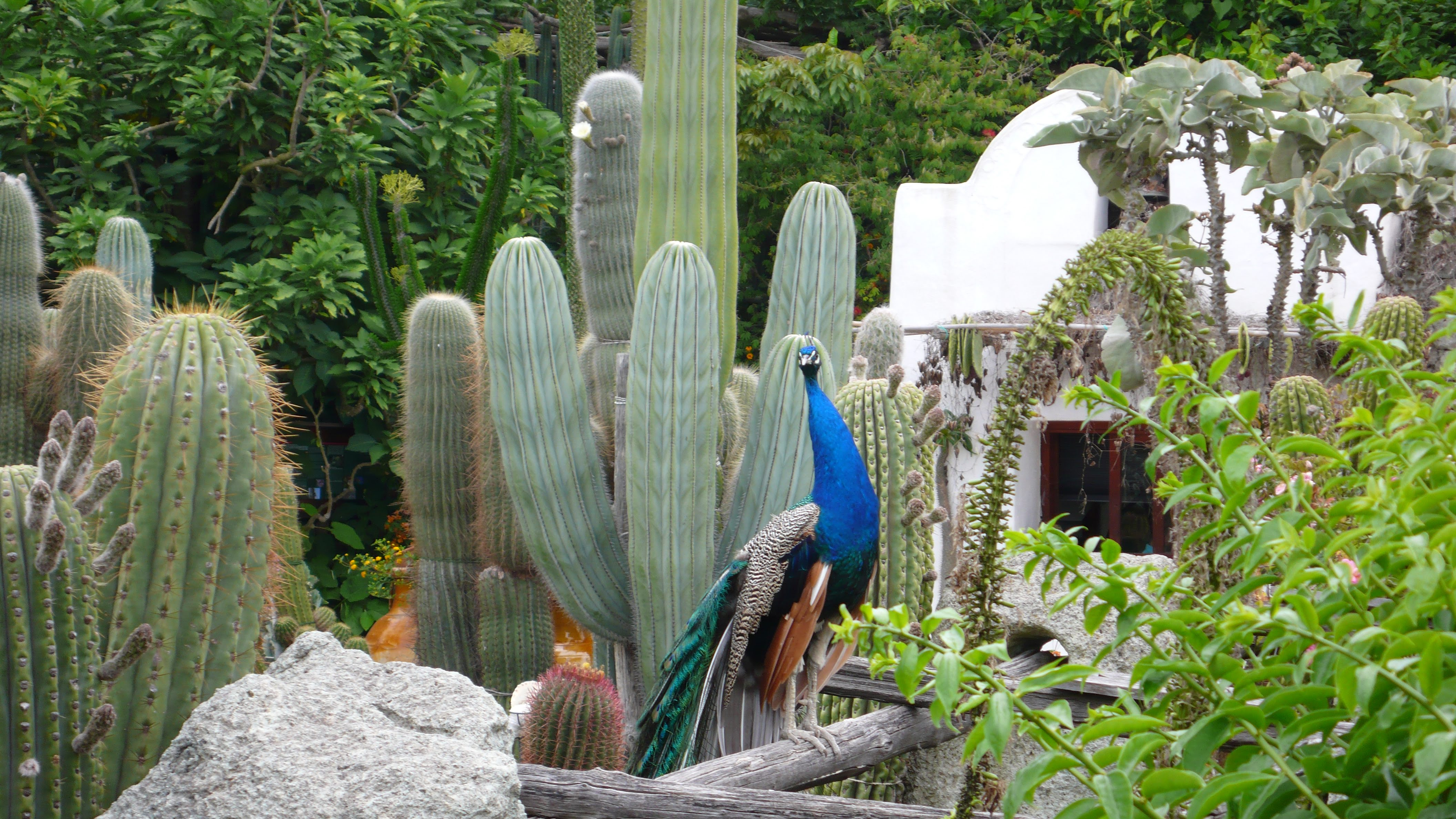
Peacock and cacti at Giardini Ravino

Giardini Ravino is an Italian botanical garden specialized in succulent plants and cacti, located on the island of Ischia, Campania, southern Italy, in the Tyrrhenian Sea.

Giardini Ravino, along with the mature areas around Villa Ravino, is the result of 45 years of great passion and loving work of Signor Peppino, the villa's owner. Exotic trees include palms, olives, and lemon and orange trees. Grape vines and flowering climbers cascade over the walls, pergolas, and terraces.

== See also ==
official web page of this Garden on Ischia Island

- List of botanical gardens in Italy
