= Giardino Botanico Alpino "Giangio Lorenzoni" =

Botanical garden in Italy

Coordinates: 46°08′14″N 12°21′38″E

The Giardino Botanico Alpino "Giangio Lorenzoni" is an alpine botanical garden located in Pian di Cansiglio, Boral del Giaz, Tambre d'Alpago, Province of Belluno, Veneto, Italy. It is open daily in the warmer months.

The garden was established in 1972 by the will of Professor Giovanni Giorgio Lorenzoni of the University of Padua, inaugurated in 1995, and expanded in recent years. It now contains over 700 plant species from the Massif Cansiglio-Cavallo including Gentiana symphyandra, Geranium argenteum, Menyanthes trifoliata, Potamogeton natans, Rudbeckia laciniata, and rare and medicinal alpine plants.

== See also ==
- List of botanical gardens in Italy
