= Alpine Botanical Garden of Campo Imperatore =

Botanical garden for alpine plants at Campo Imperatore, L'Aquila, Abruzzo, Italy

Coordinates: 42°28′12″N 13°33′00″E

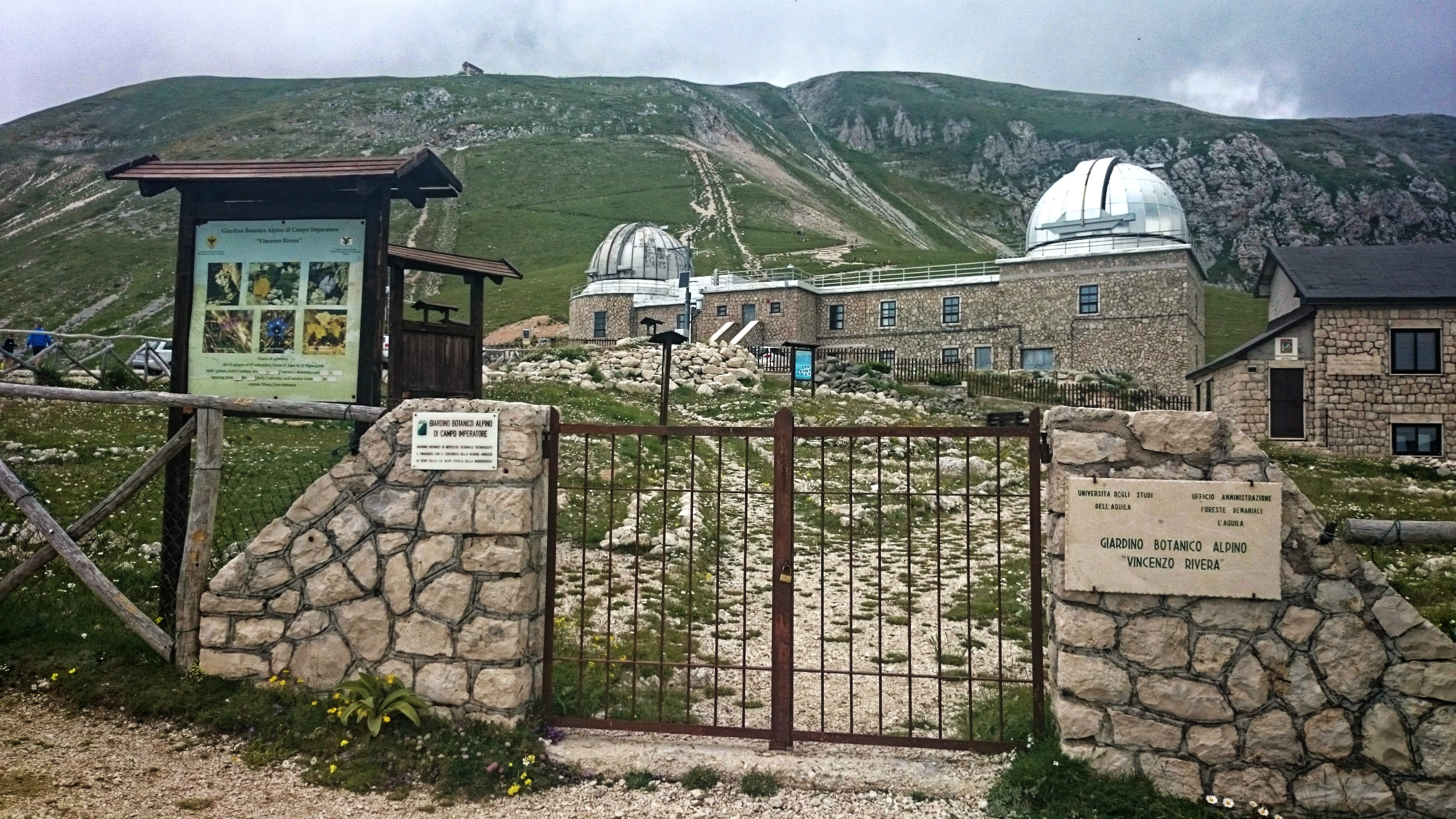
Entrance to the garden

The Alpine Botanical Garden of Campo Imperatore (Giardino Botanico Alpino di Campo Imperatore, 3000 m^{2}) is a botanical garden for alpine plants located at Campo Imperatore, L'Aquila, Abruzzo, Italy. It is operated by the University of L'Aquila.

The garden was founded in 1952 by botanist Vincenzo Rivera. It collects plants local to the nearby Gran Sasso massif of the Apennine Mountains, including hundreds of grass species, false bilberry, greater gentian, and the Apennine edelweiss.

== See also ==
- List of botanical gardens in Italy
