= Giardino Botanico, Istituto Tecnico Agrario Statale "Celso Ulpiani" =

Botanical garden in Italy

Coordinates: 42°51′N 13°35′E

The Giardino Botanico "Benito Di Lorenzo", Istituto Tecnico Agrario Statale "Celso Ulpiani" is a botanical garden operated by the Istituto Tecnico Agrario Statale "Celso Ulpiani", an agricultural school located at Viale della Repubblica, 30, Ascoli Piceno, Marche, Italy.

The garden was inaugurated in 1988 as a teaching tool for ecology and environmental education. It contains ornamental exotic species, rare varieties of olive trees, a collection of trees native to Italian hills and mountains, a greenhouse of succulent plants, herb garden, rock garden, and a pond and small travertine amphitheater.

== See also ==
- List of botanical gardens in Italy
