= Giardino Officinale di Marzana =

Botanical garden in Italy

Coordinates: 45°30′09″N 11°00′50″E

The Giardino Officinale di Marzana is a municipal botanical garden located in Marzana, Verona, Veneto, Italy.

The garden was established in 1980 by the Corpo forestale di Verona. It contains medicinal and pharmaceutical plants from the Americas, Africa, and Russia, as well as plants used in perfumes and cosmetics.

== See also ==
- List of botanical gardens in Italy
