= Orto Botanico di Cascina Rosa =

Botanical garden in Milan, Italy

Coordinates: 45°28′21.72″N 9°11′13.56″E

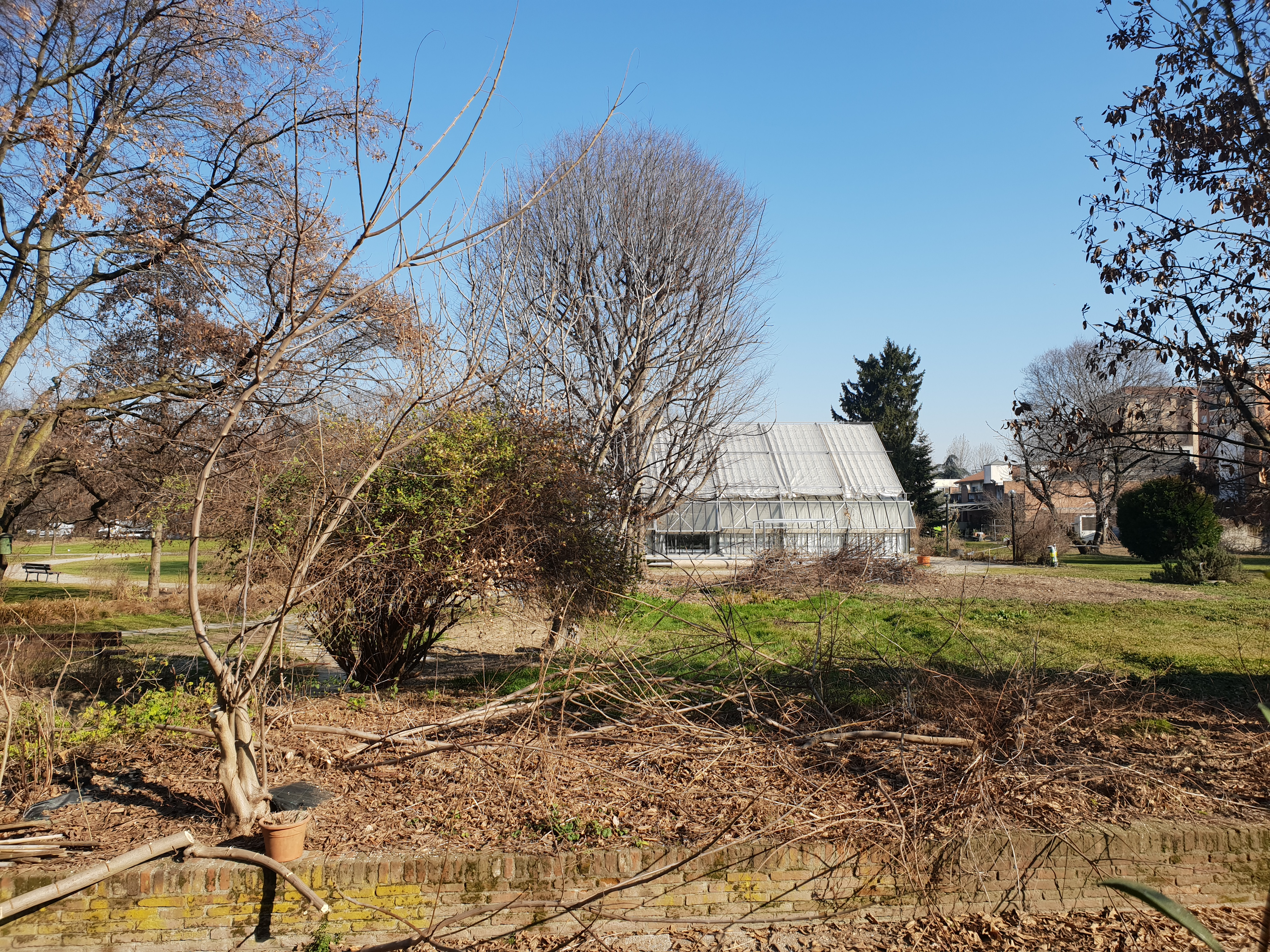
Botanical Garden of Città Studi

The orto botanico Cascina Rosa recently renamed to orto botanico Città Studi (about 22,000 m^{2}) is a botanical garden maintained by the University of Milan, and located at the end of Via Camillo Golgi 18, Milan, Italy.

The garden was established on disused farmland in 2002 for research and education. Its primary research facilities are three greenhouses that include a total of 10 separate compartments that support modern technology including cryopreservation, molecular testing, etc. Current research includes genetic improvement of rice, and exploration of useful genes in Arabidopsis thaliana. The garden's grounds contain many labeled plants, lawns, a lake, and about 1 km of walking paths.

== See also ==
- List of botanical gardens in Italy
