= Giardino Botanico del Museo Civico di Scienze Naturali di Faenza =

Botanical garden in Italy

Coordinates: 44°17′N 11°53′E

The Giardino Botanico del Museo Civico di Scienze Naturali di Faenza is a botanical garden located on the grounds of the Museo Civico di Scienze Naturali, Via Medaglie d'Oro n. 51, Faenza, Province of Ravenna, Emilia-Romagna, Italy. The garden was established in the 1980s, and currently contains about 170 species of woody plants indigenous to the Romagna region.

== See also ==
- List of botanical gardens in Italy
