= Giardino Botanico delle Alpi Orientali =

Italian botanical garden

Coordinates: 46.0835°N 12.3002°E

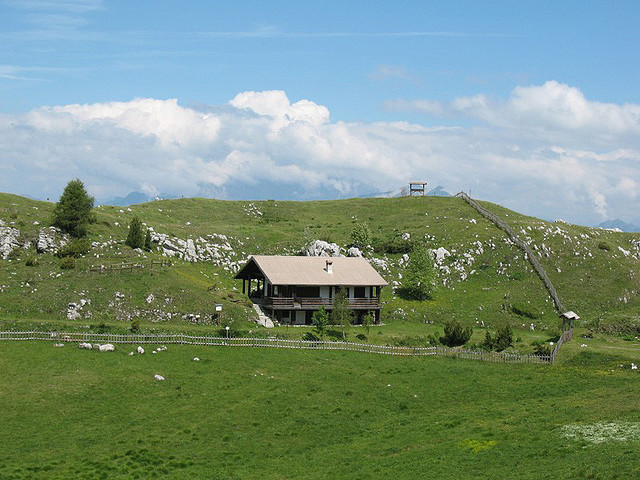
Panoramic view of the botanical garden

The Giardino Botanico delle Alpi Orientali (6.25 hectares), also known as the Giardino Botanico di Monte Faverghera, is an alpine botanical garden located in the Corpo Forestale dello Stato die Belluno on Monte Faverghera, southeast of Nevegal, Province of Belluno, Veneto, Italy. It is open daily except Mondays in the warmer months; an admission fee is charged.

The garden was founded in 1969, and located at 1,400-1,600 metres altitude on a site of sub-alpine scrub, swamps, bogs, pastures, valleys, and limestone cliffs. It contains about 800 plant species including Arenaria huteri, Moehringia glaucovirens, Paederota bonarota, Paederota lutea, Physoplexis comosa, Rhodothamnus chamaecistus, Wulfenia carinthiaca, and plants native to the oriental alps.

== See also ==
- List of botanical gardens in Italy
