= Orto Botanico Locatelli =

Botanical garden in Italy

Coordinates: 45.501797°N 12.266011°E

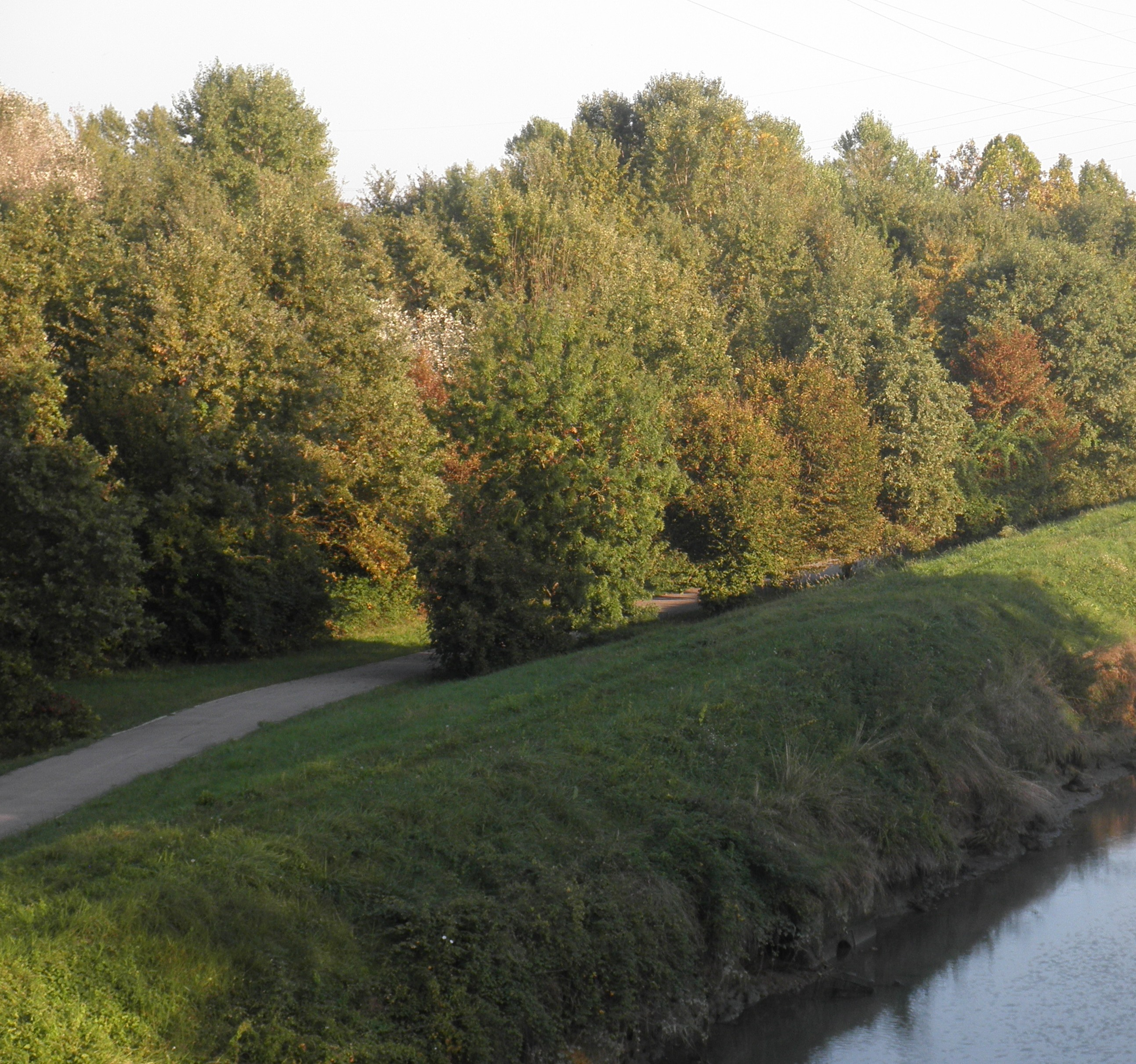

The Orto Botanico Locatelli (300 m^{2}) is a small botanical garden located in the northeastern corner of the Parco della Bissuola (Parco Albanese), Mestre, Veneto, Italy. It is open Sunday evenings from May to October

The garden aims to integrate botany, ecology, and philosophy. It contains about 250 species organized into the following sections: medicinal plants (about 60 species), trees and shrubs of the Venetian landscape, vegetables and fruits, and a small collection of ornamental plants. It also contains a small covered area, about forty seats, which serves as a site for lectures and short courses on botanical subjects.

== See also ==
- List of botanical gardens in Italy
