= Giardino Botanico Alpino "Rezia" =

Botanical garden in Italy

Coordinates: 46°28′N 10°22′E

The Giardino Botanico Alpino "Rezia" (1.5 hectares) is a botanical garden specializing in alpine plants, located in the Stelvio National Park at Bormio, Province of Sondrio, Lombardy, northern Italy.

The garden was created in 1980 with a primary mission to collect and preserve all plant species in the Stelvio National Park, but also to preserve species from other mountain regions including the Andes, the Himalayas, and the Pyrenees. It is organized as follows: species native to the Parco Nazionale dello Stelvio (1300 species in habitats including detrital areas, pasture and mountain sub-alpine bogs, scrub, etc.); collected species from the Andes, Apennines, Caucasus, Himalayas, Pyrenees, and the Arctic and Antarctic; and a scientific collection organized by genus.

== See also ==
- List of botanical gardens in Italy
