= List of botanical gardens in Italy =

List of Italian botanical gardens

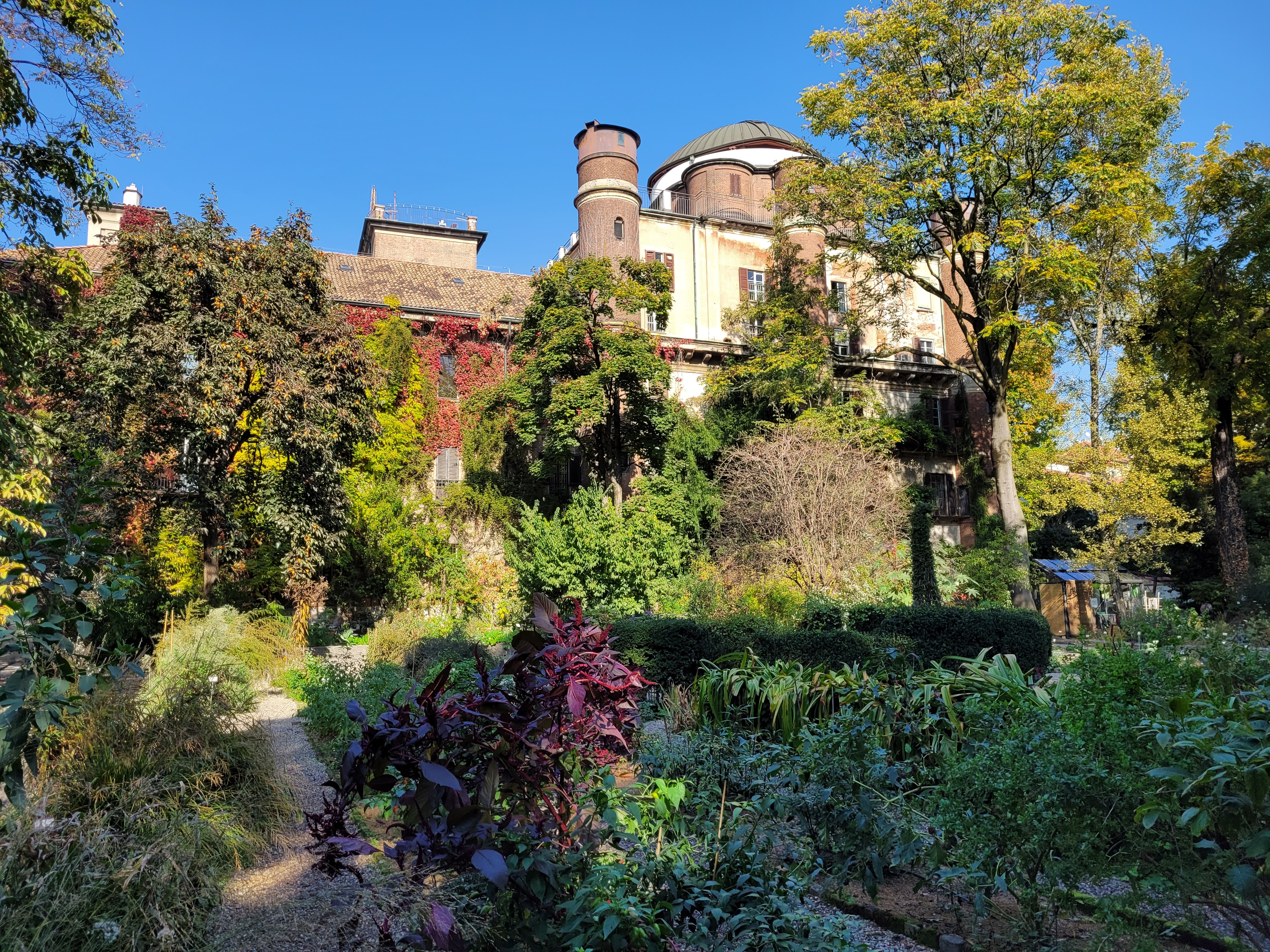
Orto Botanico di Brera, Milan

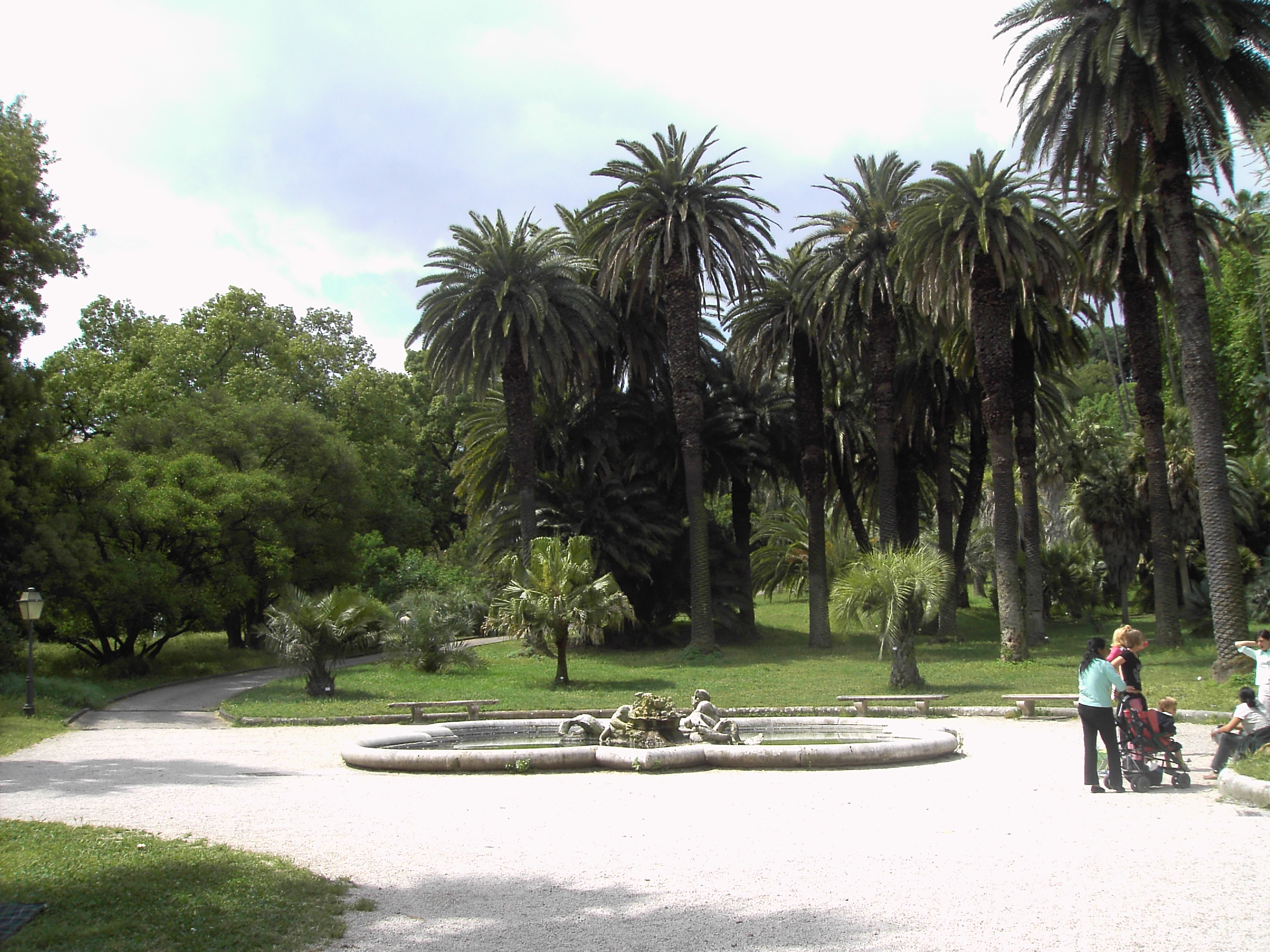
Orto Botanico dell'Università di Roma "La Sapienza"

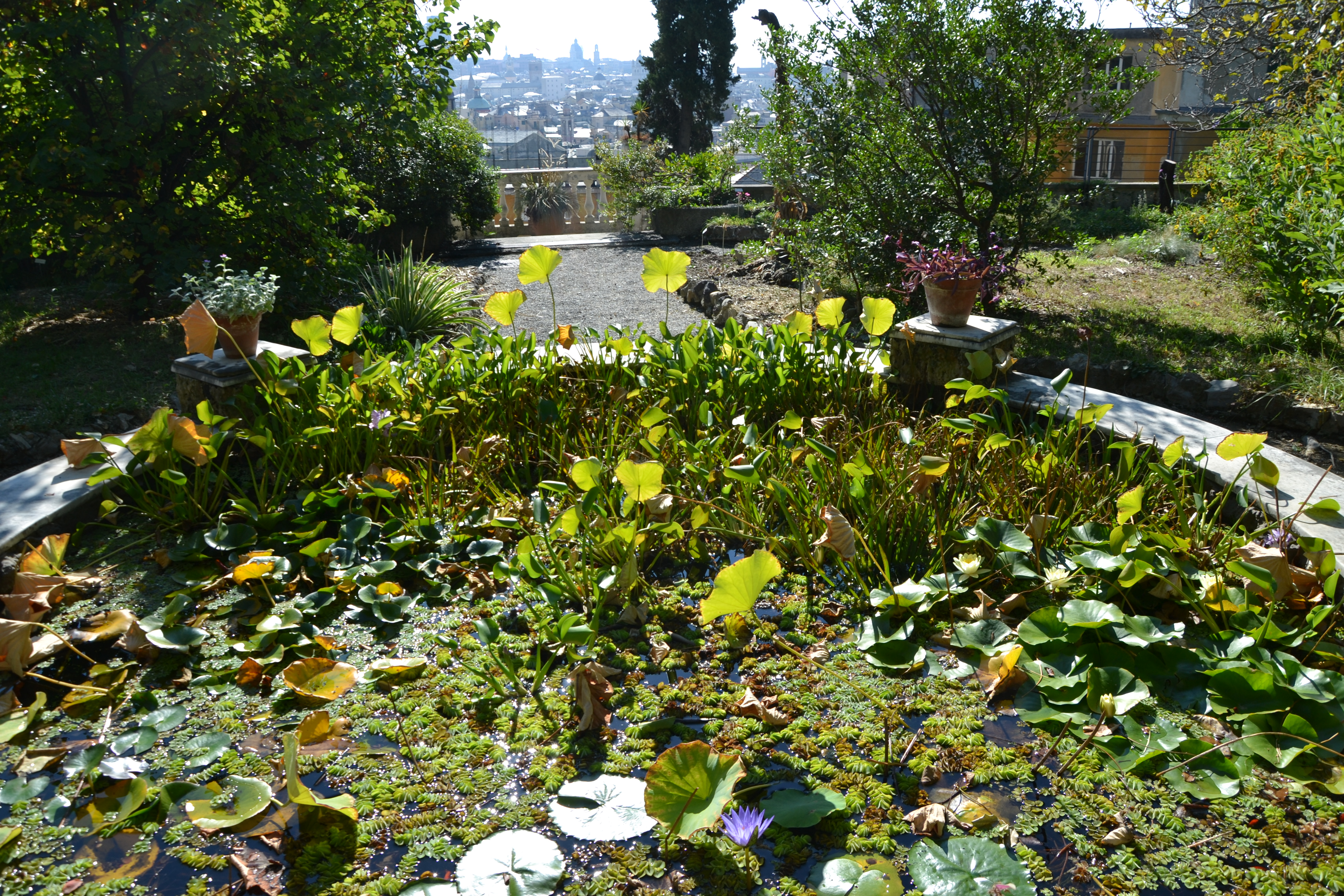
Orto Botanico dell'Università di Genova

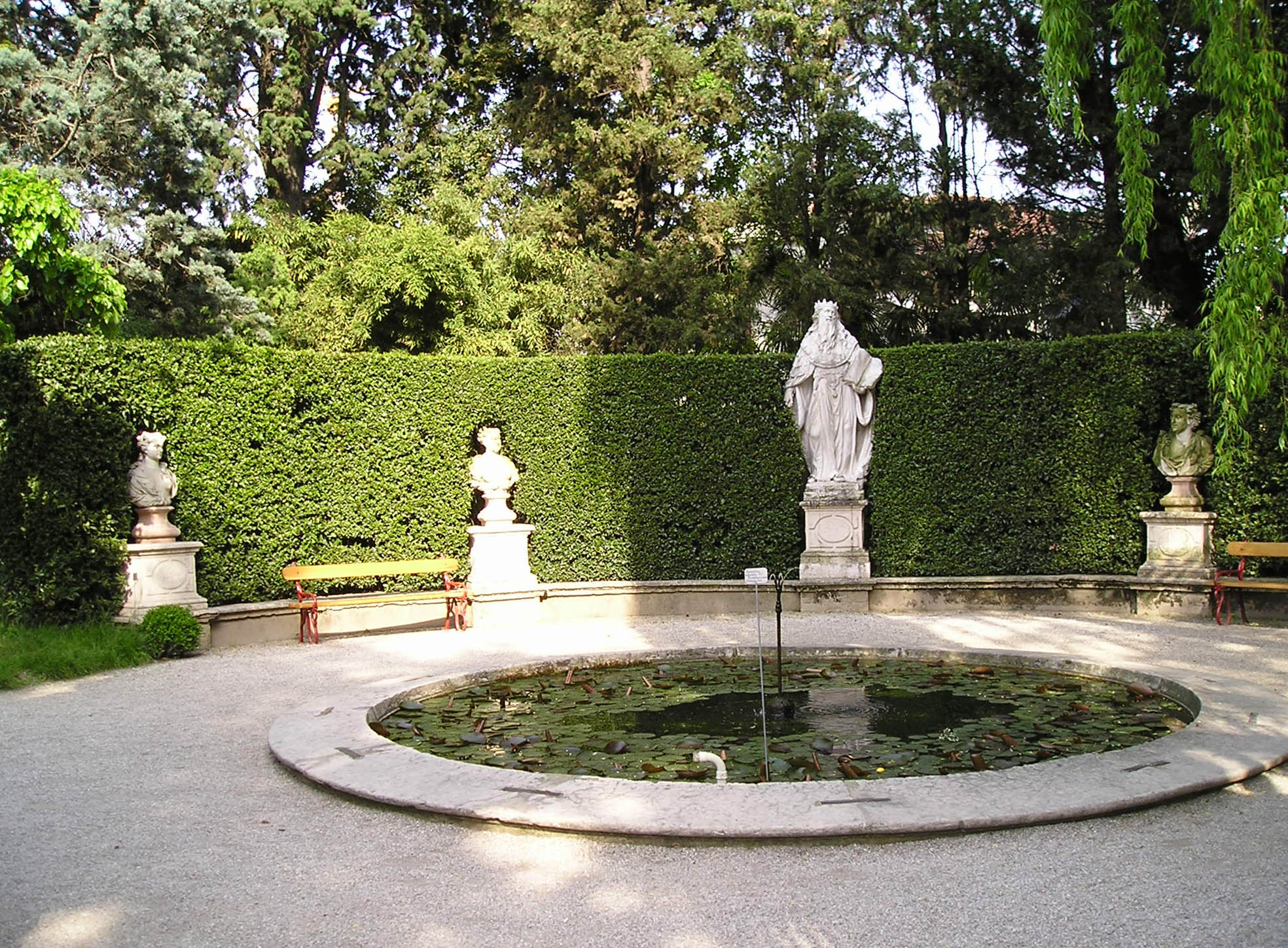
Orto botanico di Padova

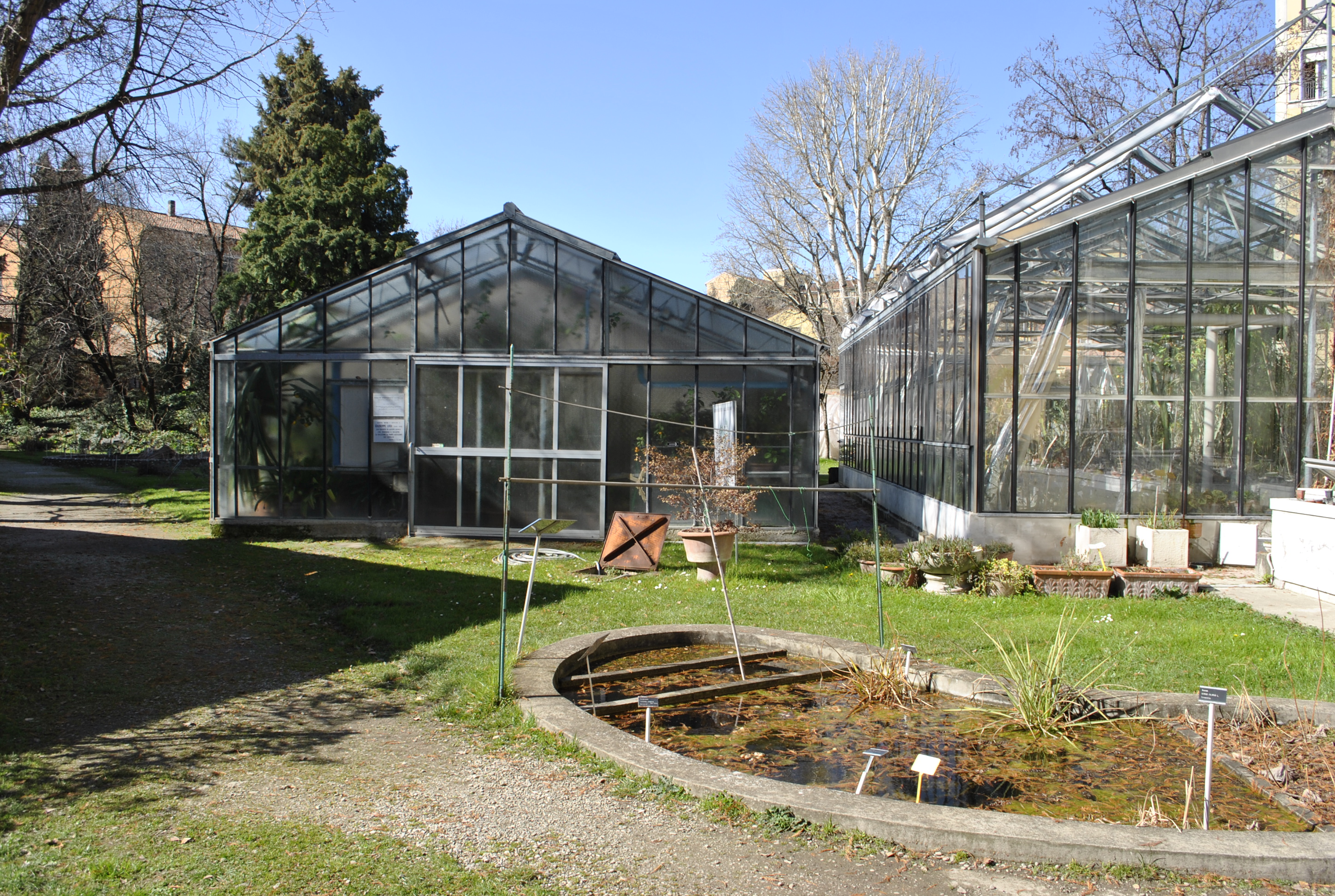
Orto Botanico dell'Università di Bologna

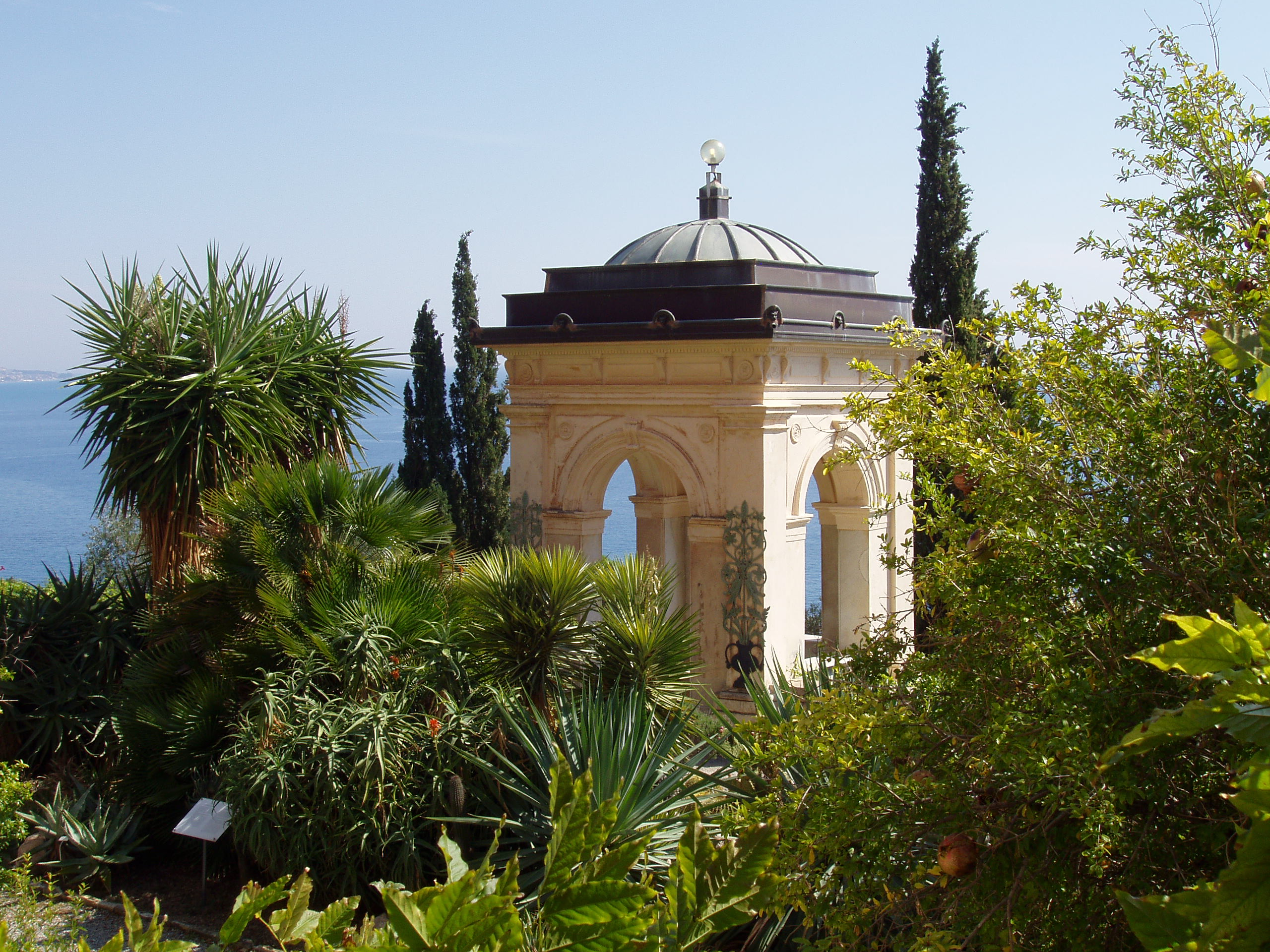
Giardini Botanici Hanbury

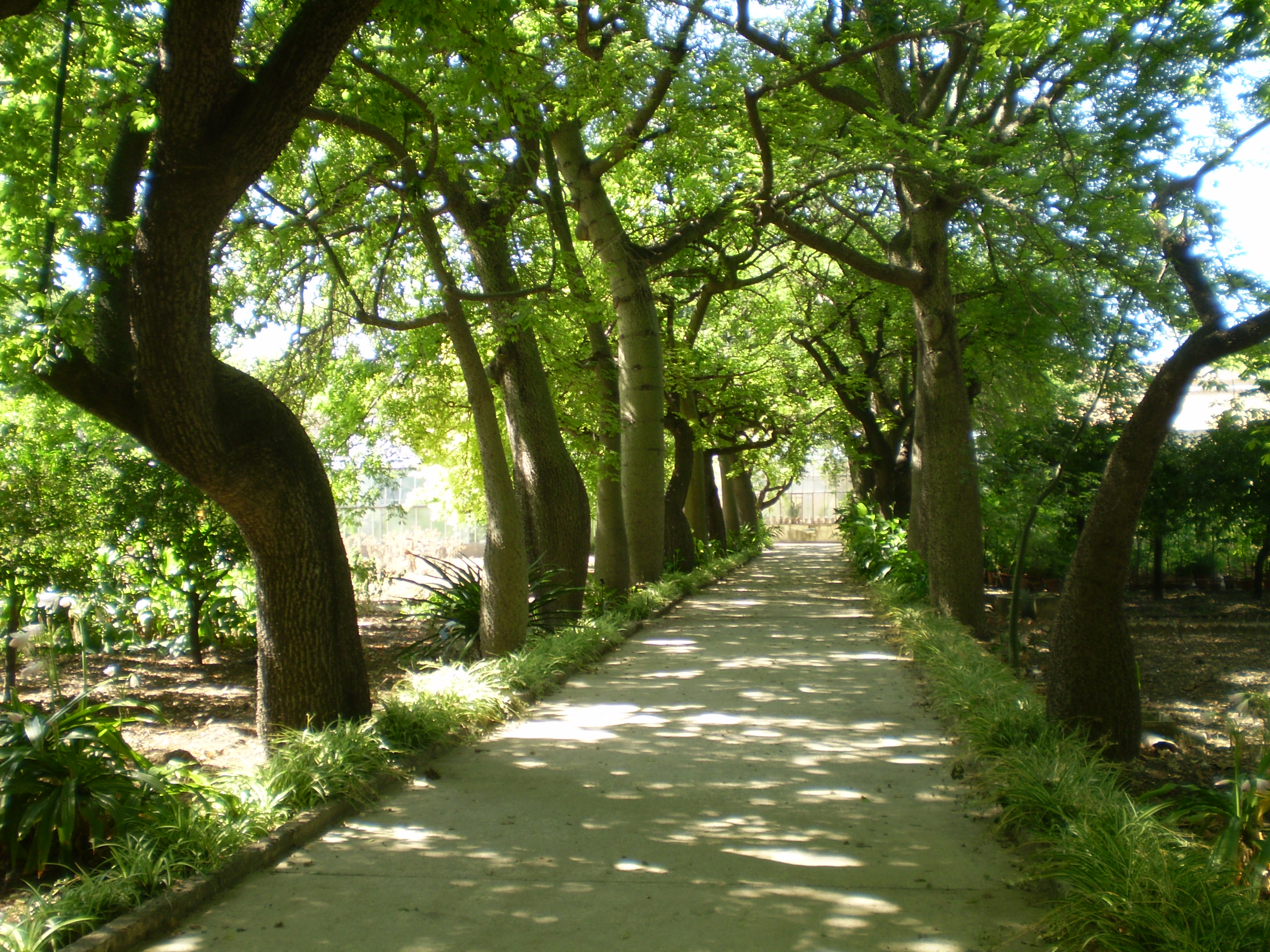
Orto botanico di Palermo

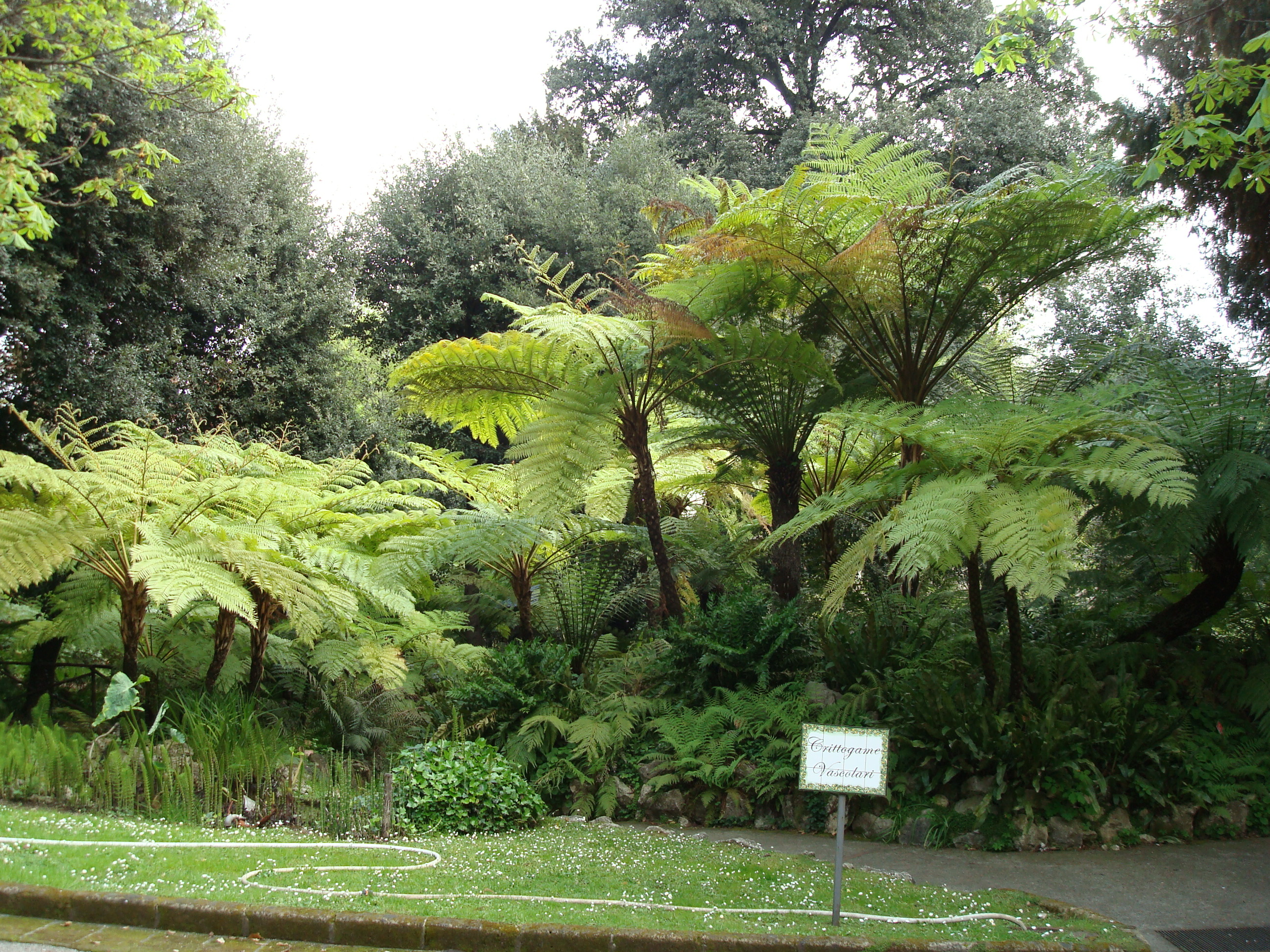
Botanical Garden of Naples

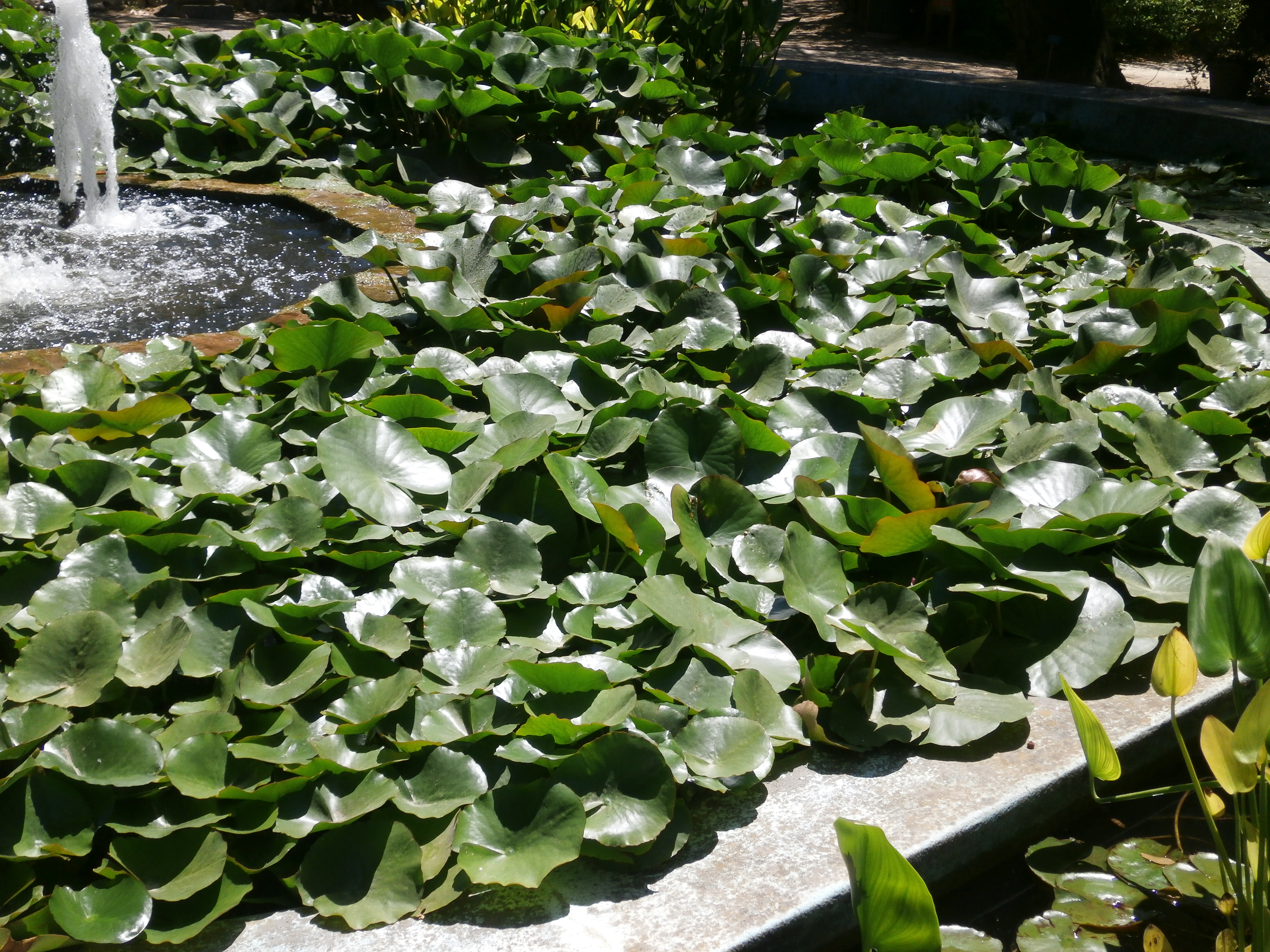
Orto Botanico dell'Università di Cagliari

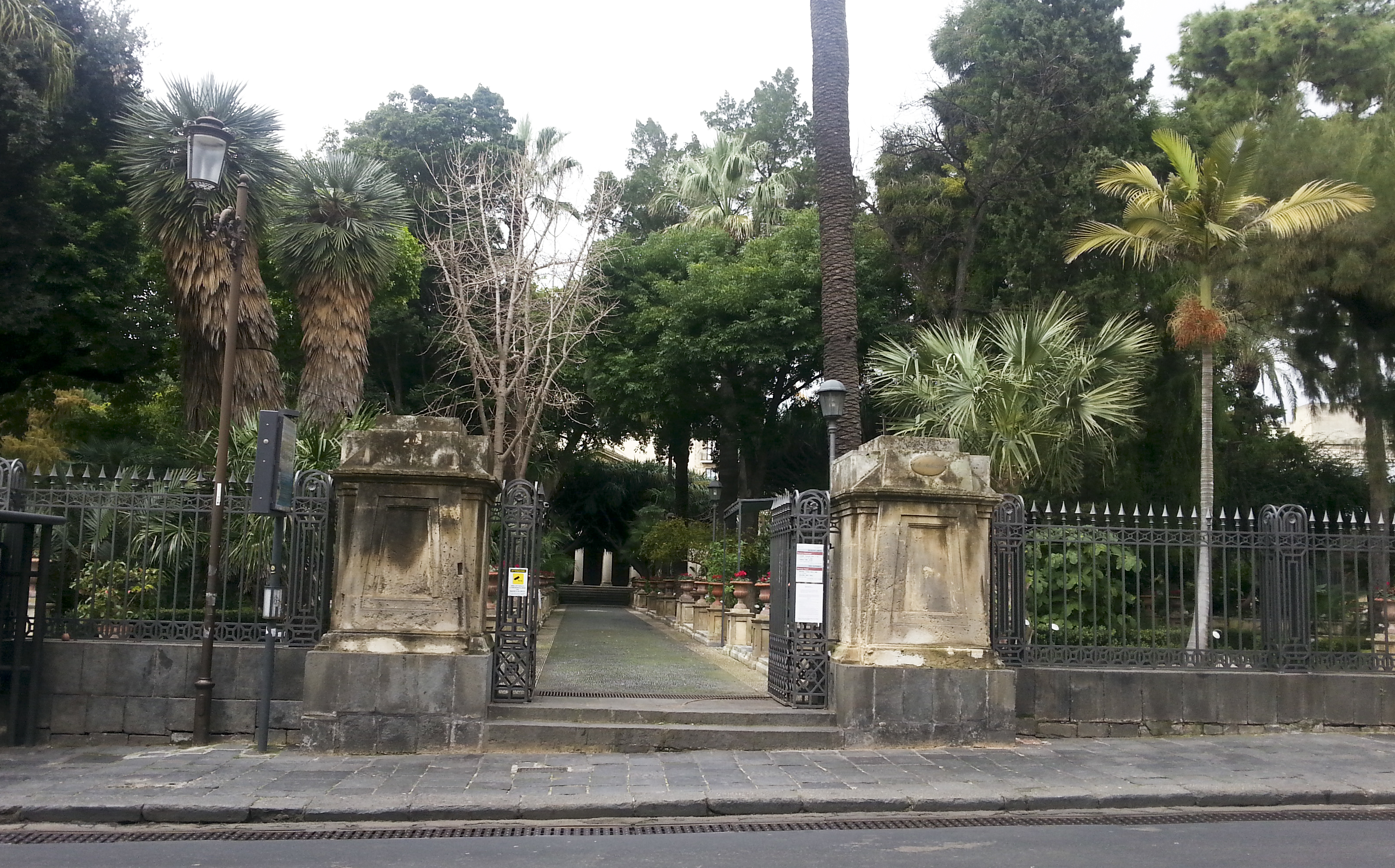
Orto Botanico dell'Università di Catania

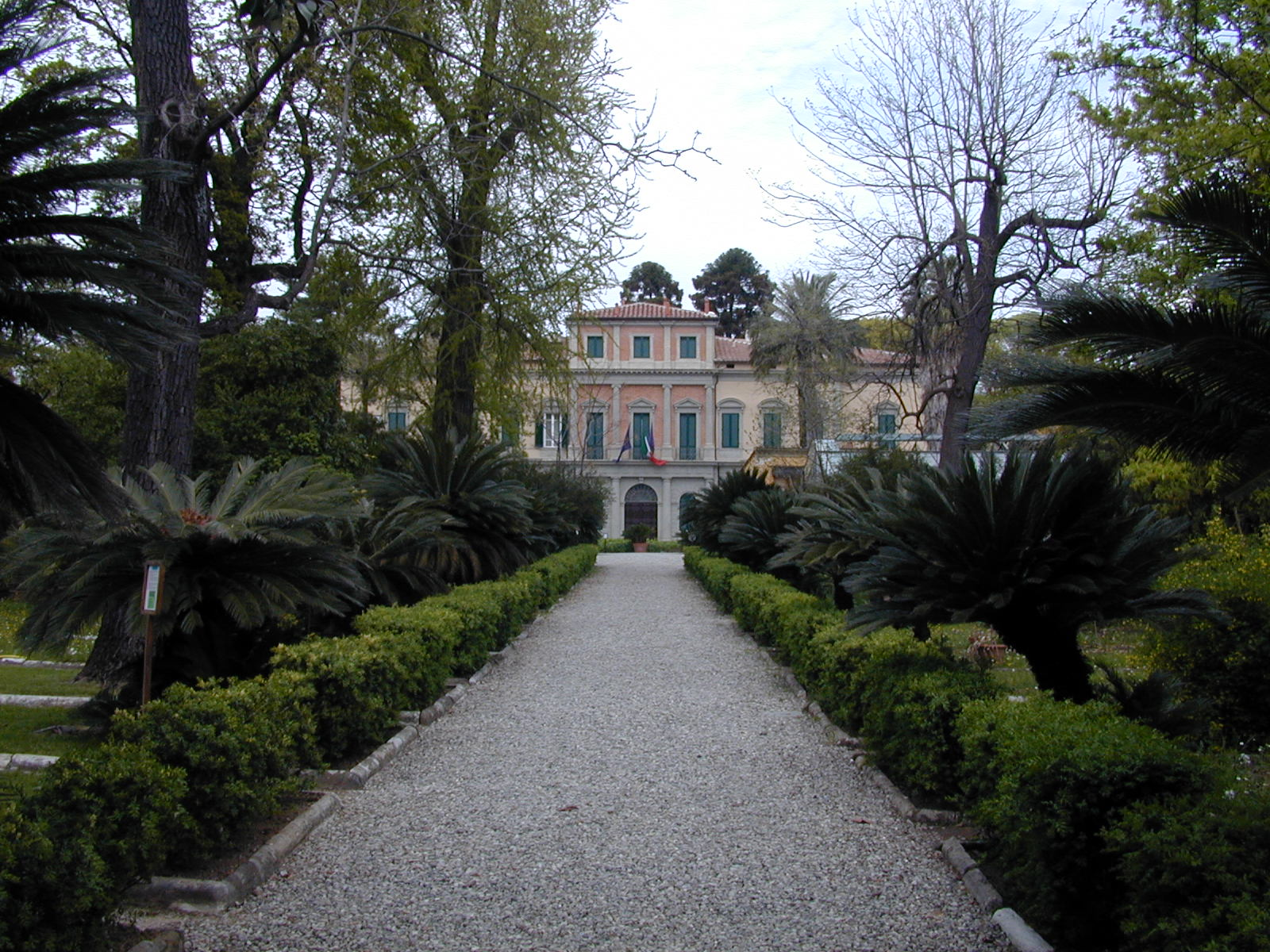
Orto botanico di Pisa

This list of botanical gardens in Italy is intended to include all significant botanical gardens and arboretums in Italy.

- Abruzzo
  - Alpine Botanical Garden of Campo Imperatore (Giardino Botanico Alpino di Campo Imperatore)
  - Giardino Botanico Daniela Brescia
  - Giardino Botanico della Majella
  - Giardino Botanico e Arboreto Appenninico del Parco Nazionale d'Abruzzo
  - Giardino Botanico Gole del Sagittario
  - Giardino Botanico "Loreto Grande"
  - Giardino Botanico Mediterraneo
  - Giardino Botanico Michele Tenore, Colle Madonna
  - Giardino dei Semplici, Chieti
  - Orto Botanico dell'Università dell'Aquila
  - Orto Botanico di Collemaggio
  - Orto Botanico Riserva Lago di Penne
  - Botanical Garden at the Sorgenti del Cavuto
- Apulia
  - Orto Botanico dell'Università di Bari, at Via Orabona, Bari
  - Orto Botanico dell'Università di Lecce, at Via Provinciale Lecce-Monteroni, Lecce
- Calabria
  - Giardino Botanico Santicelli, at Soverato
  - Orto Botanico dell'Università della Calabria, at Rende
- Campania
  - Botanical Garden of Naples (Orto Botanico dell'Università di Napoli)
  - L'Hortus Camaldulensis di Napoli
  - Orto Botanico di Portici (Orto Botanico della Facoltà di Agraria dell'Università di Napoli-Portici)
  - Giardini Ravino (succulents and cacti)
- Emilia-Romagna
  - Civico Orto Botanico "Ulisse Aldrovandi", S. Giovanni in Persiceto
  - Giardino Botanico Alpino "Esperia", Sestola
  - Giardino Botanico del Museo Civico di Scienze Naturali di Faenza
  - Giardino Botanico di Valbonella, Corniolo, Forlì
  - Giardino dei Semplici, Bagnacavallo
  - Giardino delle Erbe "A. Rinaldi Ceroni" (Giardino Officinale di Casola Valsenio)
  - Orto Botanico dell'Università di Bologna
  - Orto Botanico dell'Università di Ferrara
  - Orto Botanico dell'Università di Modena e Reggio Emilia (Orto Botanico di Modena)
  - Orto Botanico dell'Università di Parma (Orto Botanico di Parma)
- Friuli-Venezia Giulia
  - Arboreto Pascul, Tarcento, Udine
  - Civico Orto Botanico di Trieste (Botanical Garden of Trieste)
  - Giardino Botanico Carsiana (Carsiana Botanical Garden), Sgonico, Trieste
  - Orto Botanico dell'Università di Trieste
  - Orto Botanico Friulano, Udine
  - Parco Botanico Friulano "Cormor", Udine
- Lazio
  - Giardini Botanici di Stigliano
  - Giardino Botanico di Collepardo
  - Giardino Botanico Ponziano, Ponza
  - Giardino delle Orchidee Spontanee del Mediterraneo, Ladispoli
  - Orto Botanico dell'Università della Tuscia
  - Orto Botanico dell'Università di Roma "La Sapienza" (Orto Botanico di Roma)
  - Orto Botanico dell'Università di Tor Vergata
- Liguria
  - Giardini Botanici Hanbury, Ventimiglia
  - Giardino botanico Clelia Durazzo Grimaldi, Pegli
  - Giardino Botanico Montano di Pratorondanino, Campo Ligure
  - Orto Botanico dell'Università di Genova
  - Orto Botanico di Montemarcello
  - Orto Botanico di Villa Beuca (Botanical Garden of Villa Beuca)
- Lombardy
  - Giardino Botanico Alpino di Pietra Corva
  - Giardino Botanico Alpino "Rezia", Bormio, Sondrio
  - Giardino Botanico Fondazione André Heller, Gardone Riviera
  - Giardino Botanico Intragnola, Lago Maggiore
  - Giardino Botanico Polidora, Laveno Mombello
  - Giardino Botanico Trebbo Trebbi
  - Giardino Montano per la Conservazione della Biodiversità "Ruggero Tomaselli", Varese
  - Orto Botanico dell'Università di Pavia
  - Orto Botanico di Bergamo "Lorenzo Rota"
  - Orto Botanico di Brera, Milan
  - Orto Botanico di Cascina Rosa, Milan
  - Orto Botanico Didattico Sperimentale dell'Università di Milano, Milan
  - Orto Botanico "G.E. Ghirardi", Toscolano Maderno
- Marche
  - Arboretum Apenninicum, Camerino
  - Giardino Botanico, Istituto Tecnico Agrario Statale "Celso Ulpiani", Ascoli Piceno
  - Orto Botanico dell'Università di Camerino
  - Orto Botanico dell'Università Politecnica delle Marche (Orto Botanico dell'Università di Ancona)
  - Orto Botanico "Pierina Scaramella" (Orto Botanico dell'Università di Urbino)
- Molise
  - Giardino di Flora Appenninica, Capracotta, Isernia
- Piedmont
  - Giardini Botanici dell'Isola Madre, Stresa
  - Giardini Botanici Villa Taranto, Pallanza, Verbania
  - Giardino Botanico Alpinia, Stresa
  - Giardino Botanico Alpino "Bruno Peyronel", Val Pellice, Torino
  - Giardino Botanico Alpino Valderia
  - Giardino Botanico di Oropa
  - Giardino Botanico Rea, Val Sangone, Torino
  - Orto Botanico di Torino (Orto Botanico dell'Università di Torino)
- Sardinia
  - Arboreto Mediterraneo del Limbara
  - Giardino Montano Linasia
  - Orto Botanico di Cagliari (Orto Botanico dell'Università di Cagliari)
  - Orto Botanico dell'Università di Sassari
- Sicily
  - Giardino Botanico "Nuova Gussonea", Ragalna
  - Orto Botanico dell'Università di Catania
  - Orto Botanico dell'Università di Messina
  - Orto Botanico dell'Università di Palermo
- Tuscany
  - Arboreti di Vallombrosa, Reggello, Firenze
  - Giardino Botanico Tropicale dell'Istituto Agronomico per l'Oltremare, Firenze
  - Giardino delle Rose
  - Giardino dell'Iris, Firenze
  - Giardino Montano dell' Orecchiella
  - Museo e Arboreto Carlo Siemoni, Badia Prataglia, Arezzo
  - Orto Botanico Comunale di Lucca
  - Orto Botanico dei Frignoli, Fivizzano, Massa
  - Orto Botanico del Mediterraneo, Livorno
  - Orto Botanico dell'Università di Siena
  - Orto Botanico di Firenze (Giardino dei Semplici)
  - Orto Botanico di Pisa (Orto Botanico dell'Università di Pisa)
  - Orto Botanico Forestale dell'Abetone
  - Orto Botanico "Pania di Corfino"
  - Orto Botanico delle Alpi Apuane "Pietro Pellegrini", Pian della Fioba
  - Orto dei Semplici Elbano
- Trentino-Alto Adige/Südtirol
  - Arboreto di Arco
  - Gardens of Trauttmansdorff Castle
  - Giardino Botanico Alpino alle Viotte di Monte Bondone
  - Giardino Botanico Alpino di Passo Coe
  - Giardino Botanico Preistorico di Molina di Ledro
- Umbria
  - Orto Botanico di Perugia (Orto Botanico dell'Università di Perugia)
- Aosta Valley
  - Paradisia Alpine Botanical Garden
  - Savoy Castle Alpine Botanical Garden
  - Chanousia Alpine Botanical Garden
  - Alpine Botanical Garden Saussurea
- Veneto
  - Giardino Alpino "Antonio Segni", Taibon Agordino, Belluno
  - Giardino Botanico Alpino "Giangio Lorenzoni", al Pian di Cansiglio
  - Giardino Botanico Alpino San Marco, Valli del Pasubio
  - Giardino Botanico della Scuola Media Statale "E.Toti" di Musile di Piave, Musile di Piave
  - Giardino Botanico delle Alpi Orientali (Giardino Botanico di Monte Faverghera), Monte Faverghera
  - Giardino Botanico Litoraneo di Porto Caleri (Giardino Botanico Litoraneo del Veneto), Rosolina
  - Giardino Fenologico "Alessandro Marcello", Treviso
  - Giardino Officinale di Marzana, Verona
  - Orto Botanico Conservativo Carlo Spegazzini, Treviso
  - Orto Botanico Conservativo Francesco Busnello, Treviso
  - Orto Botanico del Monte Baldo, Ferrara di Monte Baldo
  - Orto Botanico di Padova (Orto Botanico dell'Università di Padova)
  - Orto Botanico Locatelli, Mestre

== See also ==
- Botanical garden
- List of botanical gardens
- History of gardening
