= Orto Botanico del Monte Baldo =

Botanical garden in Italy

Coordinates: 45°40′25″N 10°51′39″E

The Orto Botanico del Monte Baldo (about 20,000 m^{2}), also known as the Orto Botanico di Novezzina or Orto Botanico d'Europa, is a botanical garden located at 1232 meters altitude on Monte Baldo, Via General Graziani 10, Novezzina, Ferrara di Monte Baldo, Province of Verona, Veneto, Italy. It is open daily in the warmer months; an admission fee is charged.

The garden was established in 1989 by the town, recreating natural ecosystems of rocky landscapes, beech forest, pasture, and wetlands. It contains over a thousand species native to Mount Baldo, including the endemic Campanula petraea, Carex baldensis, and Primula spectabilis. All species are indicated by cards indicating family, genus, species, and Italian name.

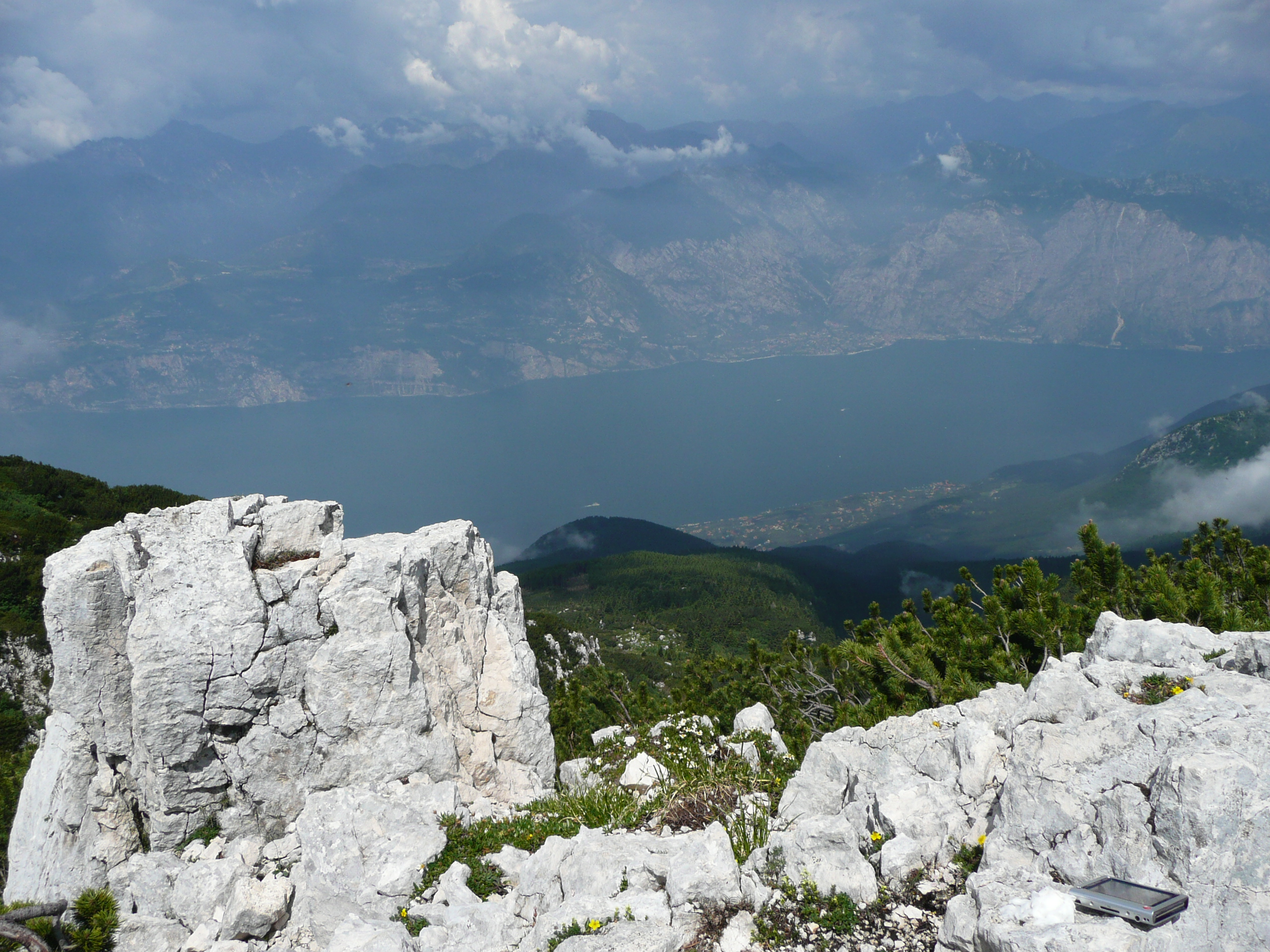
Orto Botanico del Monte Baldo

== See also ==
- List of botanical gardens in Italy
