= Giardino delle Erbe "A. Rinaldi Ceroni" =

Botanical garden in Emilia-Romagna, Italy

Coordinates: 44°13′N 11°37′E

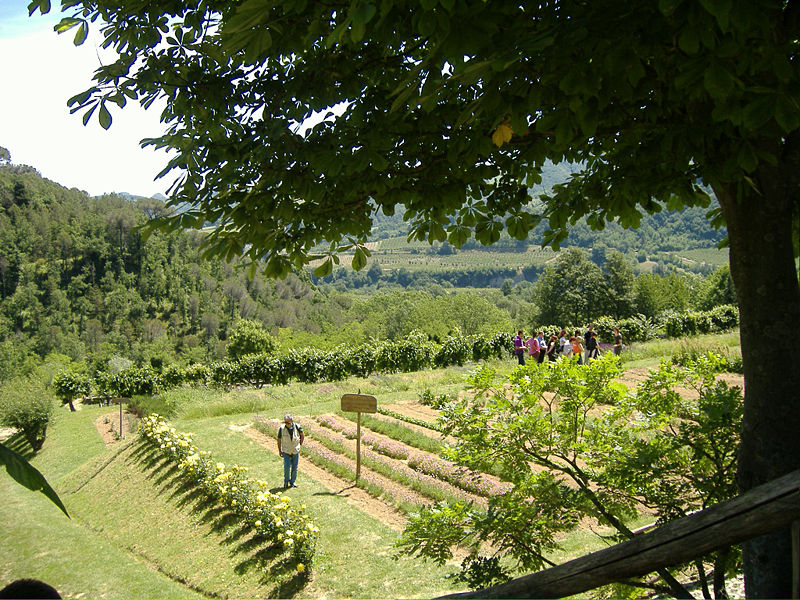
The Herb Garden "Augusto Rinaldi Ceroni"

The Giardino delle Erbe "A. Rinaldi Ceroni" (4 hectares), formerly known as the Giardino Officinale di Casola Valsenio, is a botanical garden specializing in herbs, located Via del Corso 2/1, 48010 Casola Valsenio, Province of Ravenna, Emilia-Romagna, Italy. It is open during the months of September and October.

== History ==
The garden was established in 1938 by Professor Augusto Rinaldi Ceroni (1913-1999) for research and experiments. In 1975 its ownership passed to the regional government, with management assumed in 2000 by the municipality of Casola Valsenio. Today it contains more than 400 species of medicinal and aromatic herbs.

== See also ==
- List of botanical gardens in Italy
