= Orto Botanico Comunale di Lucca =

Botanical garden in Italy

Coordinates: 43°50′29.21″N 10°30′41.15″E

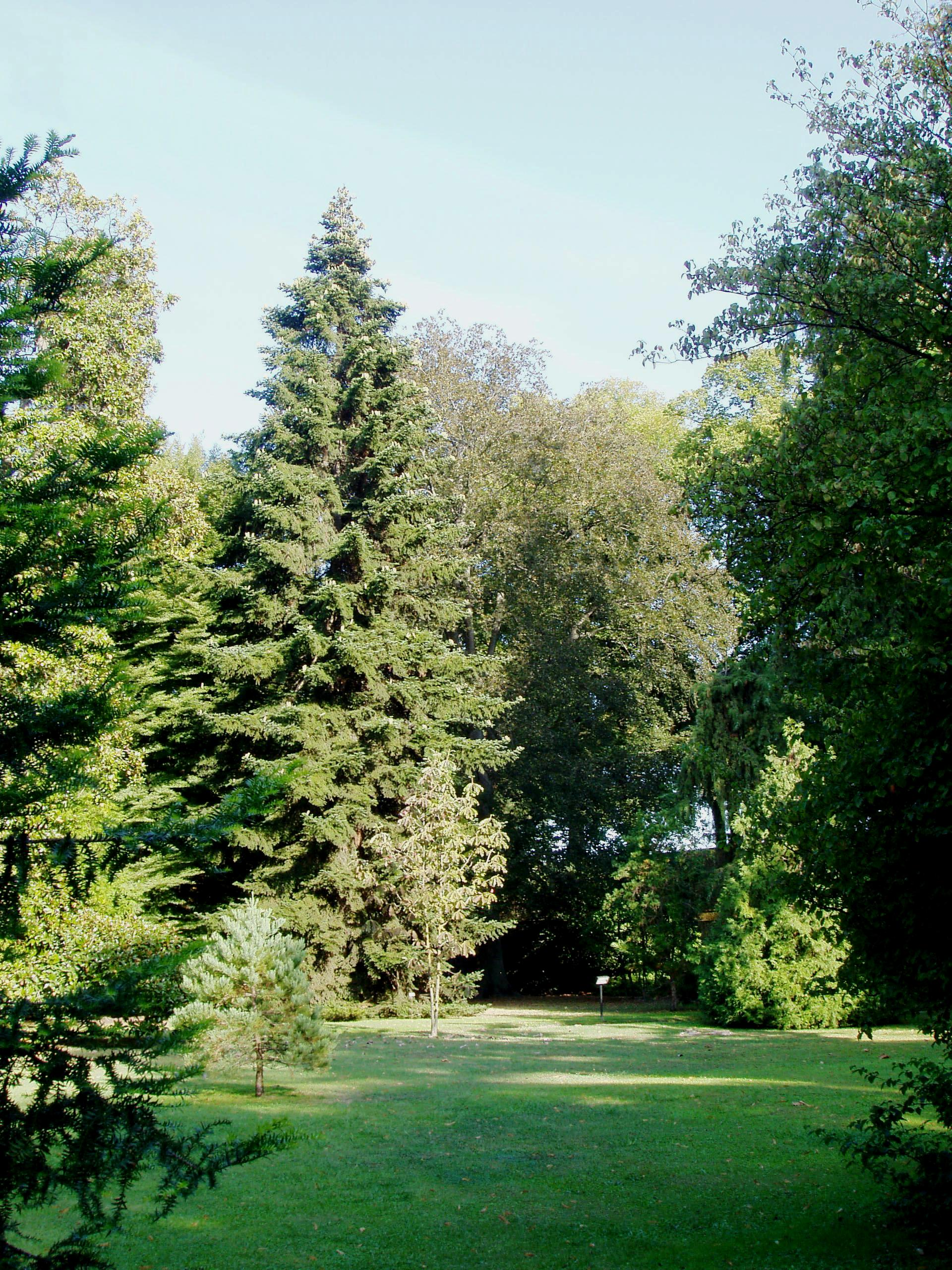
General view.

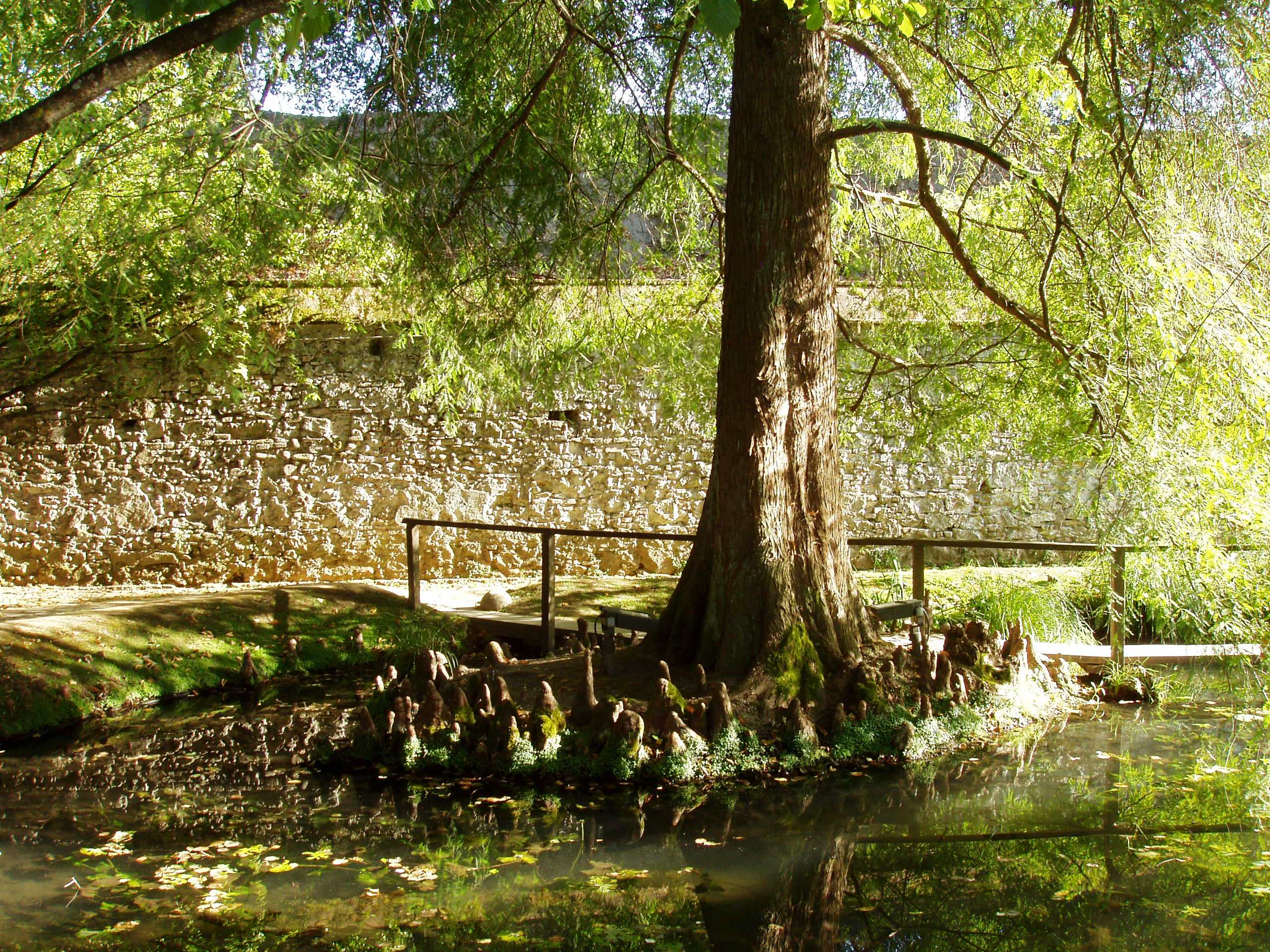
Pond and city wall.

The Orto Botanico Comunale di Lucca is a botanical garden located at Via del Giardino Botanico, 14, Lucca, Italy, and operated by the city. It is open daily during the warmer months, and weekday mornings off-season. An admission fee is charged.

The garden was established in 1820 by Marie Louise, Duchess of Parma, and contains a number of mature plantings of botanical interest. Its site is roughly triangular, set within a corner of Lucca's city wall, and organized into two main sections. One contains the gardens proper with an arboretum, pond, and smaller plantings; the other contains the greenhouse, botanical school, and laboratories. The Museo Botanico "Cesare Bicchi" contains a herbarium and archive.

== See also ==
- List of botanical gardens in Italy
