= Giardino botanico Gole del Sagittario =

Botanical garden in Italy

Coordinates: 41.995541°N 13.803924°E

Botanical Garden at the Sorgenti del Cavuto
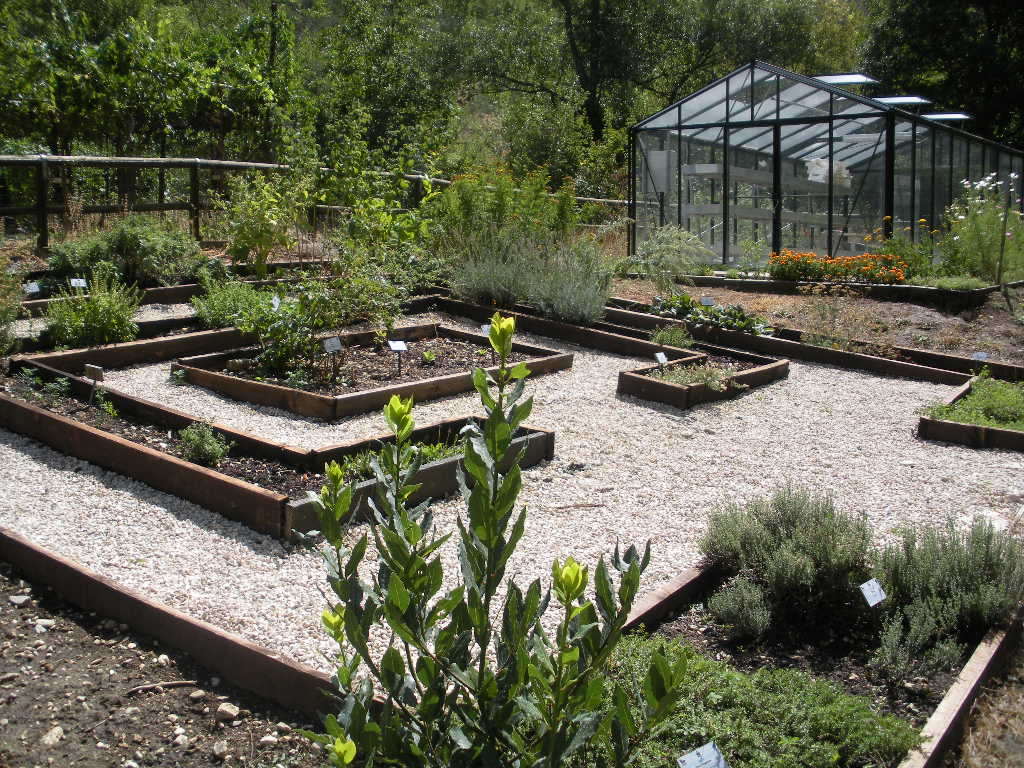
- Interactive map of Botanical Garden at the Sorgenti del Cavuto
- Location: Riserva delle Gole del Sagittario, Italy
- Nearest city: Anversa degli Abruzzi
- Area: 4.5 km^{2} (1.7 sq mi)
- Established: 1996
- Governing body: WWF and Anversa degli Abruzzi
- Website: www.comune.anversa.aq.it/riserva.asp

The Botanical Garden at the Sorgenti del Cavuto is a botanical garden in Anversa degli Abruzzi, province of L'Aquila, Abruzzo, central-southern Italy. The garden was established in 1999, and is managed by the municipality of Anversa degli Abruzzi in agreement with the World Wide Fund for Nature. It contains about 380 native plant species, of which 45 are classified as endangered.

The Botanical Garden is the latest offshoot of the Riserva delle Gole del Sagittario near Anversa degli Abruzzi. The Botanical Garden is accessed is through a descent from Anversa degli Abruzzi.

The Sorgenti del Cavuto flow directly into the river Sagittario, the main tributary of the Aterno-Pescara. The garden has an irrigated nursery whose water is provided by the Sagittario and the Sorgenti del Cavuto. These rivers also feed a power plant.

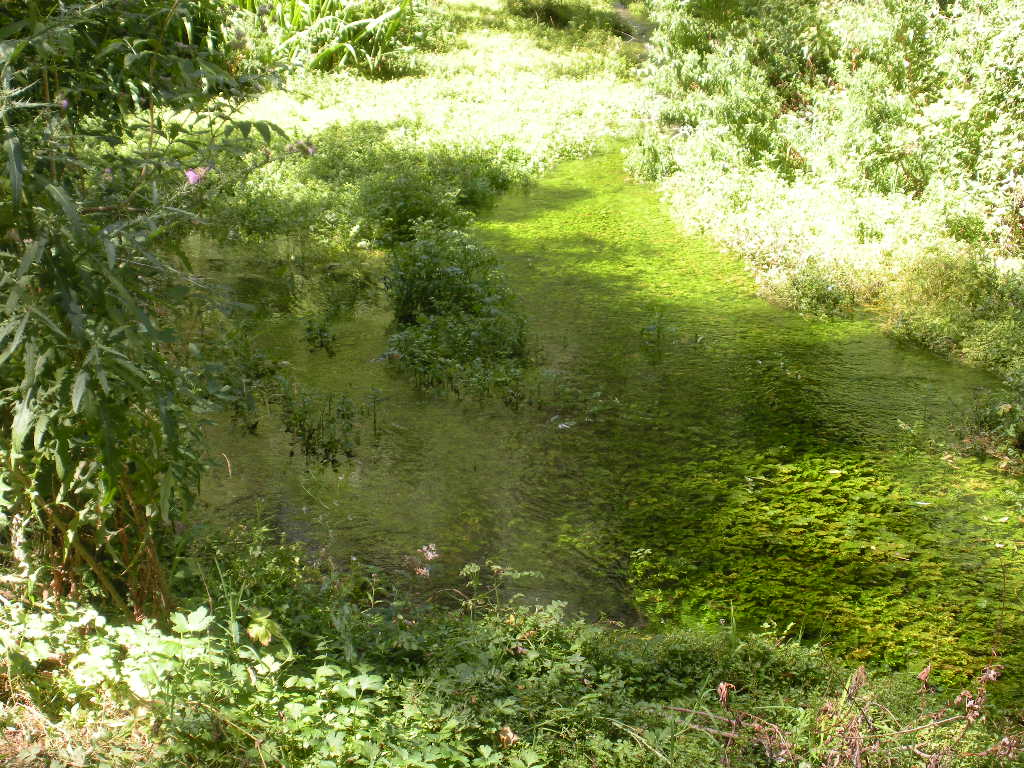
Water plants.

== See also ==
- List of botanical gardens in Italy

== Sources ==
- Opuscolo Anversa degli Abruzzi. comune di Anversa degli Abruzzi.
