= Orto Botanico dell'Università di Lecce =

Botanical garden in Italy

Coordinates: 40°20′N 18°10′E

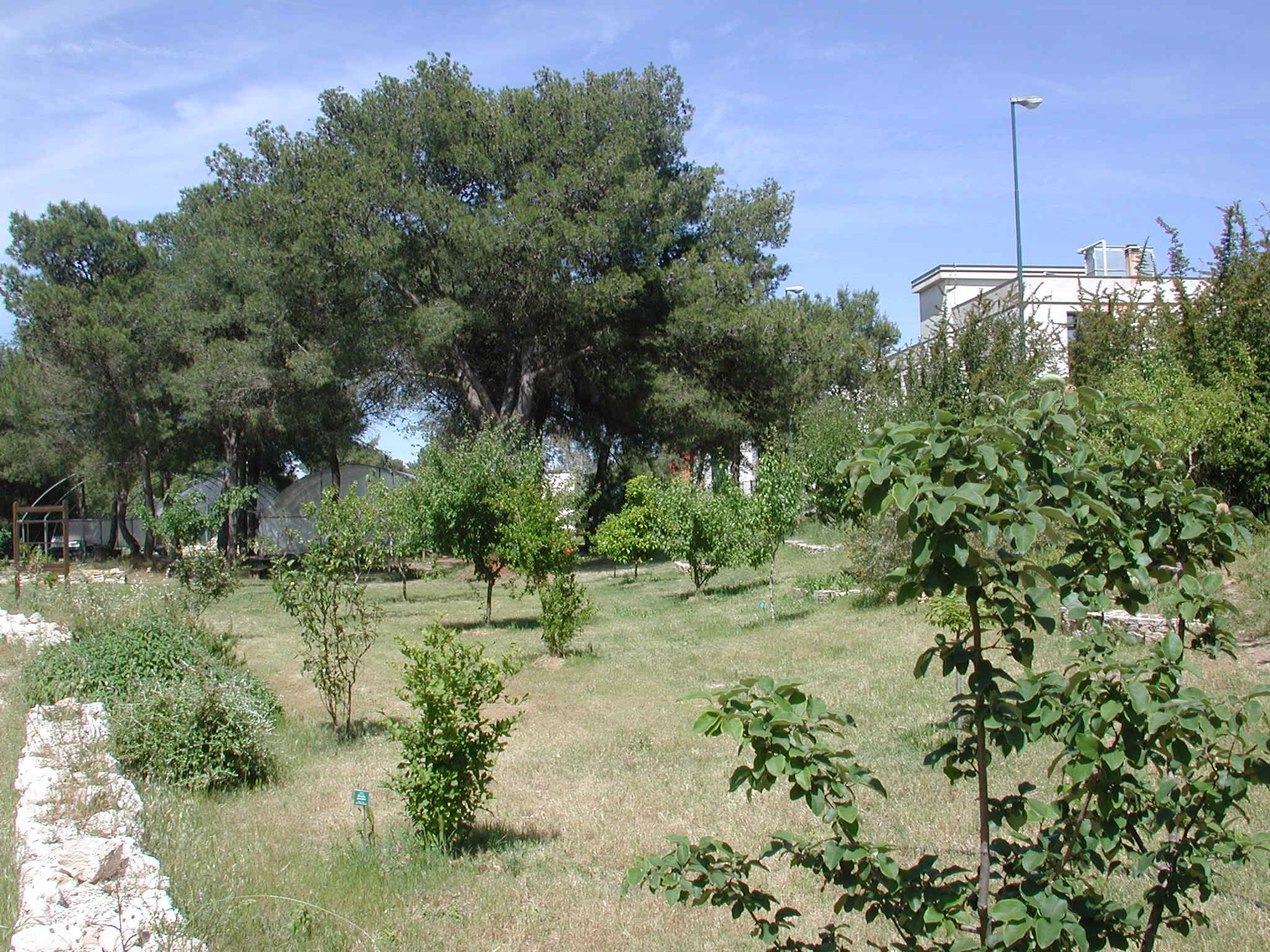
Fruit trees in the botanical garden

The Orto Botanico dell'Università di Lecce (2 hectares), also known as the Orto Botanico di Lecce, is a botanical garden operated by the University of Lecce and located at Via Provinciale Lecce-Monteroni, 73100, Lecce, Apulia, Italy.

Although Lecce's earliest botanical garden dates to 1814, it began an irreversible decline in 1866 after its acquisition by the province, and today's garden is a separate undertaking begun in 1994 by the university's biology department. It currently contains several hundred species.

== See also ==
- List of botanical gardens in Italy
