= Civico Orto Botanico di Trieste =

Botanical garden in Friuli-Venezia Giulia, Italy

Coordinates: 45°38′N 13°48′E

The Civico Orto Botanico di Trieste (90 hectares, cultivated area 10,000 m^{2}) is a municipal botanical garden located at via Marchesetti 2, Trieste, Friuli-Venezia Giulia, Italy.

The garden was established in 1842 when the city first experimented with plantations of the Austrian black pine. By 1861 a botanical garden began to take shape with species collected from the Julian Alps in Istria and Dalmatia. In 1873 it opened to the public, in 1877 published its first catalog of 254 plants (Delectus seminum quae Hortus Botanicus tergestinus pro mutual communicatione offert), and in 1903 became a public institution attached to the Museum of Natural History. In 1986 the garden was forced to close to the public for lack of resources, but in 2001 part of the garden reopened.

Today the garden includes several sections, including one devoted to the natural flora of Carso, Trieste, Istria, and adjacent territories. Other sections include historic flower beds, poisonous plants, ornamental plants, plants magical, garden of simples, lotus flowers, food plants, formal garden, dyeing plants, and useful plants. It also contains greenhouses (110 m^{2}).

== See also ==
- List of botanical gardens in Italy
