= Giardino Botanico e Arboreto Appenninico del Parco Nazionale d'Abruzzo =

Botanical garden in Italy

Coordinates: 41.8061°N 13.7869°E

The Giardino Botanico e Arboreto Appenninico del Parco Nazionale d'Abruzzo is a botanical garden and arboretum located in the Parco Nazionale d'Abruzzo, Lazio e Molise at via Santa Lucia, 67032 Pescasseroli, Province of L'Aquila, Abruzzo, Italy.

The garden contains about 2,000 species including Arctostaphylos uva-ursi, Daphne mezereum, Juniperus nana, Pinus mugo, Rhamnus pumilus, Rosa pendulina, Salix retusa, Quercus ilex, and Vaccinium myrtillus.

== See also ==
- List of botanical gardens in Italy
