= Arboreto di Arco =

Botanical garden in Italy

Coordinates: 45°55′N 10°53′E

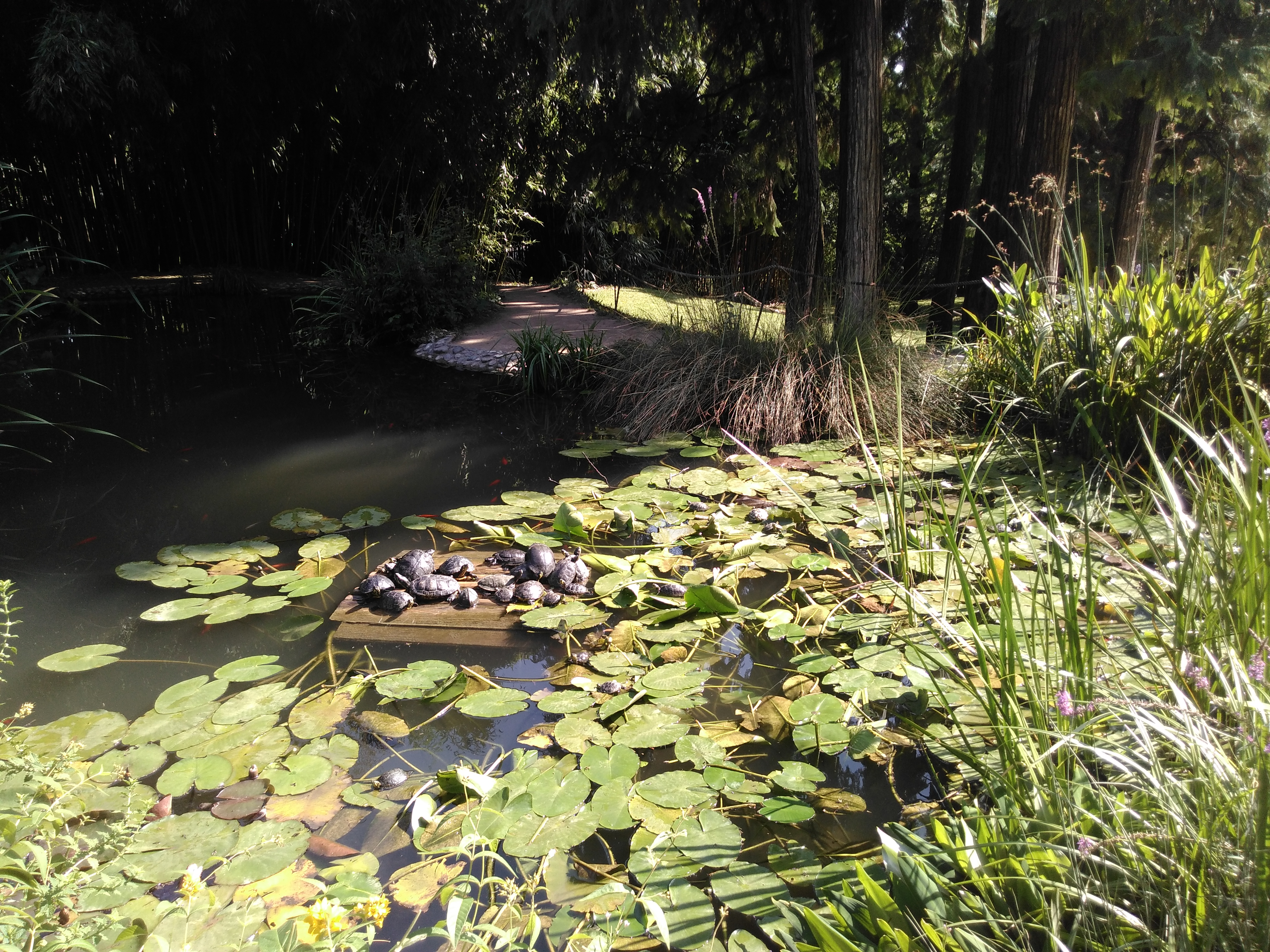

The Arboreto di Arco (1 hectare) is an arboretum and botanical garden located at Viale delle Palme, 1, Arco, Trentino, Italy. It is open daily without charge.

The arboretum was created in 1872 by Archduke Albert, Duke of Teschen, on the grounds of his villa, not far from Lake Garda. It was renovated in 1964 as miniature landscapes, reconstructing natural plant environments, and in 1993 became part of the Museo Tridentino di Scienze Naturali. Today the arboretum contains about 150 species of plants from around the world, each labeled with Latin binomial, family, common name, and area of origin.

== See also ==
- List of botanical gardens in Italy
