= Orto Botanico Didattico Sperimentale dell'Università di Milano =

Botanical garden in Italy

Coordinates: 45°28′29.64″N 9°13′35.12″E

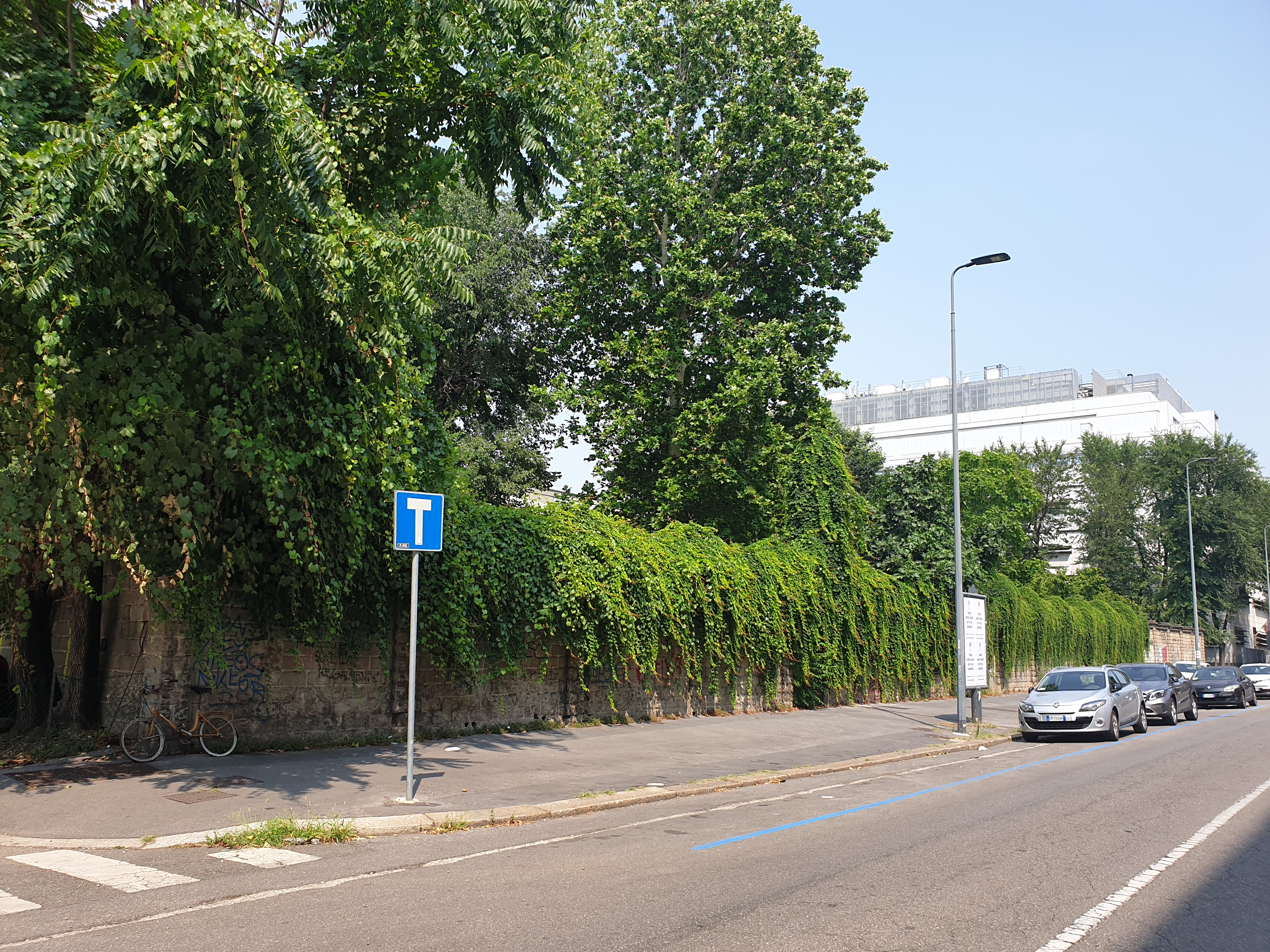
Orto Botanico Didattico Sperimentale dell'Università di Milano

The Orto Botanico Didattico Sperimentale dell'Università di Milano (3,600 m^{2}) is a small botanical garden operated by the Istituto di Scienze Botaniche of the University of Milan. It is located at Viale Colombo 60, Milan, Italy.

The garden is used primarily for student education, such as raising corn in a controlled environment to study breeding and mutations. It also contains ferns, succulent plants, and various species raised from seeds including asparagus, barley, peas, petunias, primroses, rice, spinach, tobacco, tomatoes, and wheat.

== See also ==
- List of botanical gardens in Italy
