= Alpine Botanical Garden Saussurea =

Highest alpine botanical garden in Europe

Coordinates: 45.7833°N 6.9667°E

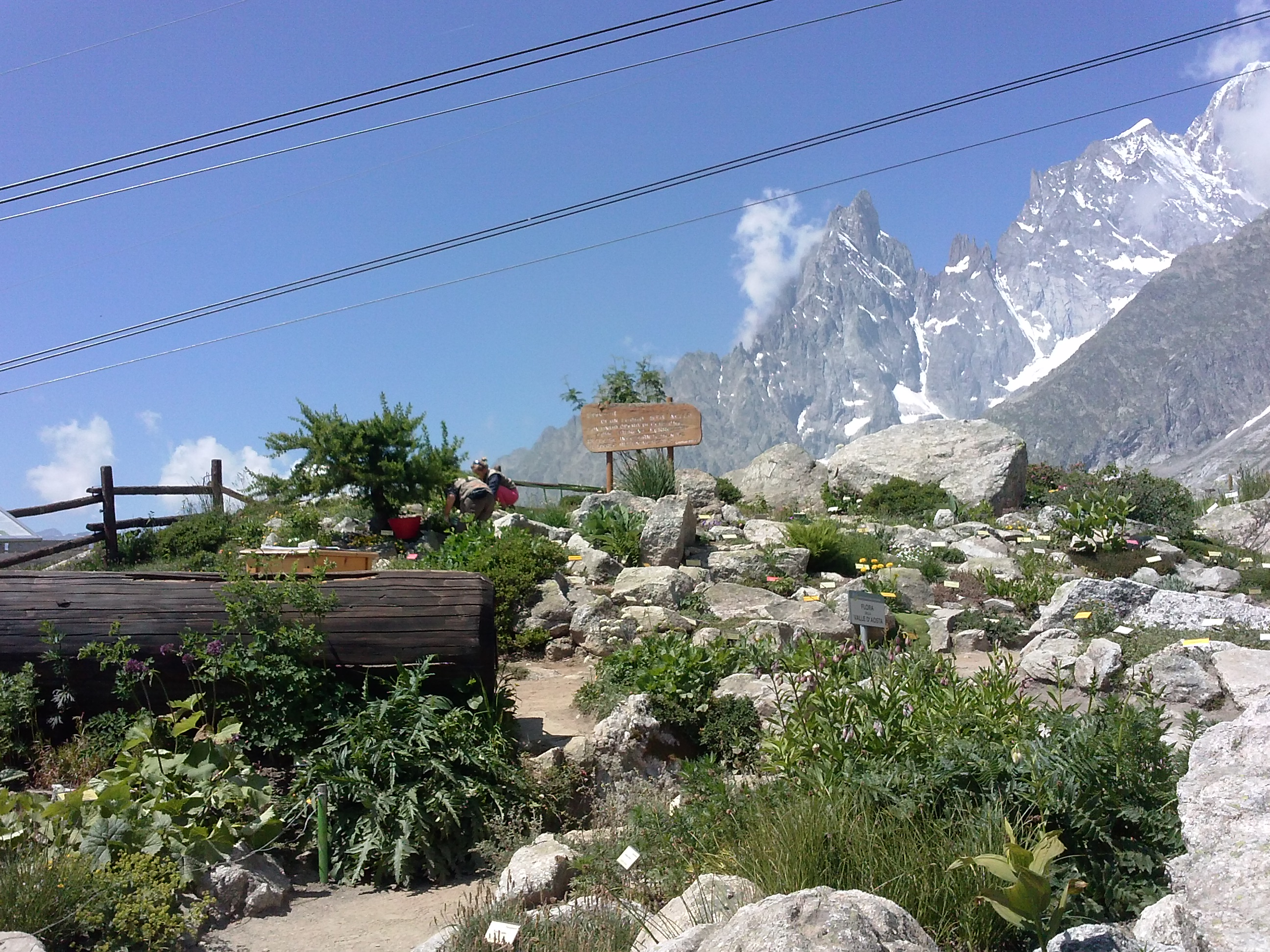

The alpine botanical garden Saussurea (Italian: Giardino Botanico Alpino Saussurea, French: Jardin botanique alpin Saussurea) is the highest alpine botanical garden in Europe, at 2,173 metres above sea level. It is located in Courmayeur, Aosta Valley, Italy. The Saussurea garden is one of the four alpine botanical gardens in the Aosta Valley, and its 7,000 square metres contain the typical alpine flora of Mont Blanc. Its name comes from Horace-Bénédict de Saussure, who made the first known ascent of Mont Blanc in 1786, and from whom the flower Saussurea alpina also takes its name. It is open from June to September.

== The Territory ==
The garden is situated on a high ridge south of Mont Blanc, and contains a rockery, alpine pasture, talus slopes, and wetlands. Snow covers the area for 8 to 9 months per year, to a depth of 3–4 metres, disappearing in late June. Plants are identified by a card with family name, gender, species, Italian name, and country of origin.

The Saussurea garden covers an area of 7000 m² on the Pavillon du Mont Fréty, a natural saddle between the glacier and moraine of Mont Fréty and those of the Aiguille de Toula, on the south side of the Mont Blanc massif, in the Courmayeur area;

It can be reached by the Skyway Monte Bianco cable car, or on foot along path no. 20 from La Palud (Courmayeur) to the Pavillon hut (2h00'-2h30'). Nearby, it is possible to visit the Pavillon du Mont Fréty nature reserve.

The garden, which is home to 900 species, brings together the main environments of the Aosta Valley, and in this sense promotes the enhancement of the local botanical heritage, combining it with public enjoyment. In the first part of the Garden, the rockeries house the botanical species according to the logic of their geographical origin; in the innermost sector there are reconstructions of mountain environments.

== History ==
The botanical garden was founded in 1984 by the Donzelli, Gilberti and Ferretti Foundation, dedicated to the protection and study of the Mont Blanc flora, with the support of the Autonomous Region of Valle d'Aosta and the State Forestry Corps, but was only inaugurated three years later. With the passing of time, the aspect of study and protection of the species took precedence over the tourist aspect.

Today, the Saussurea alpine garden is managed by the Saussurea Foundation, formerly known as the Donzelli, Gilberti and Ferretti Foundation, after the names of its promoter, Count Giovanni Battista Gilberti, and its founder, Laurent Ferretti.

== See also ==
- List of botanical gardens in Italy
