= Orto Botanico "Pierina Scaramella" =

Botanical garden in the University of Urbino, Urbino, Italy

Coordinates: 43.72746°N 12.63666°E

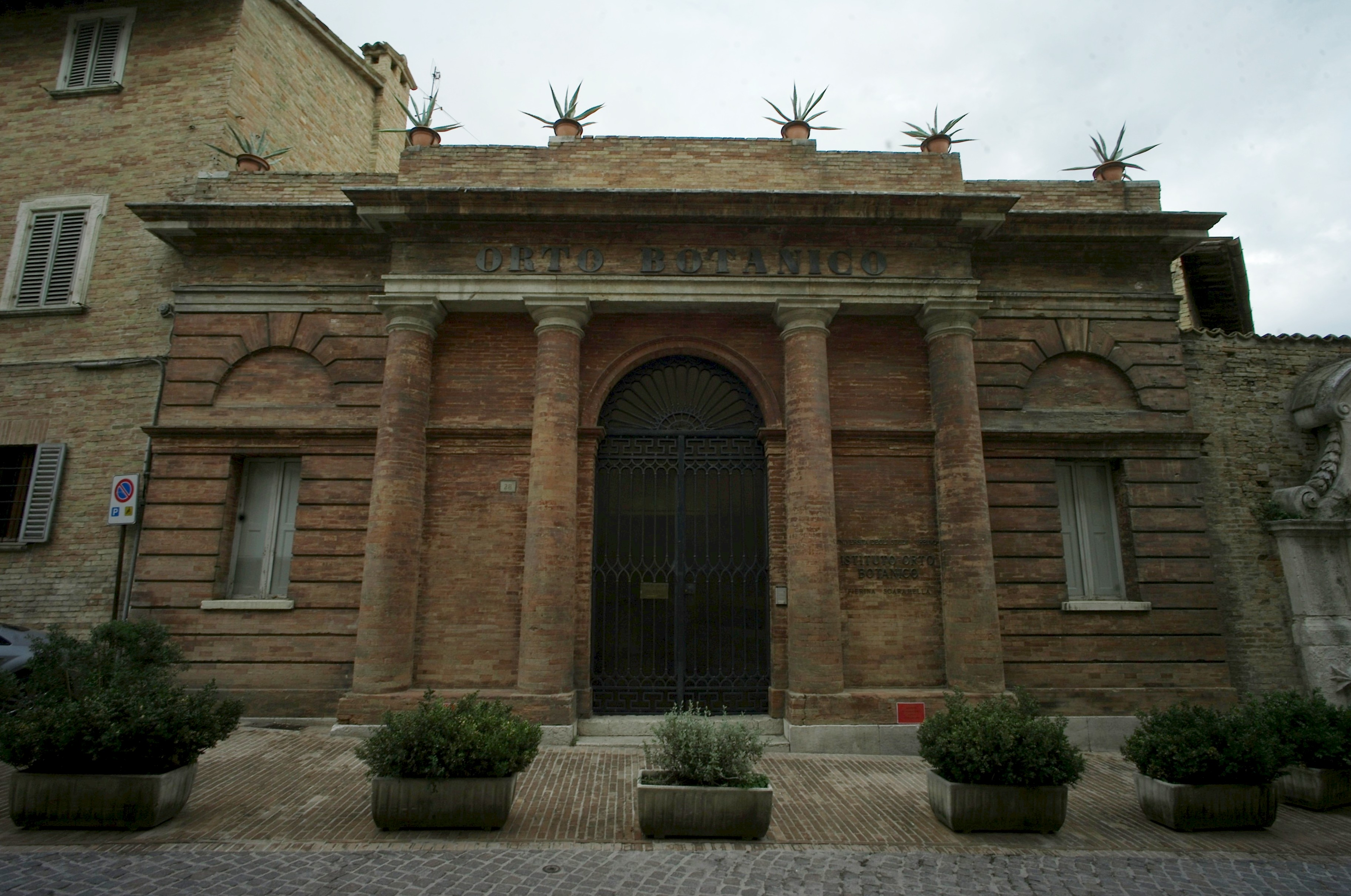
entrance of the Orto Botanico

The Orto Botanico "Pierina Scaramella" (2,200 m^{2}), also known as the Orto Botanico dell'Università di Urbino, is a botanical garden maintained by the University of Urbino, and located at via Bramante, 28, Urbino, Marche, Italy. the entrance fee is 1 euro.

The garden was established in 1806 by Giovanni De Brignole.

Today the garden contains medicinal and ornamental plants such as Ailanthus glandulosus, Sophora japonica, and Cycadaceae and Gymnospermae. Trees include Acer pseudo−platanus, Fagus silvatica, Fraxinus excelsior, Liriodendron tulipifera, Quercus ilex, and Taxus baccata.

== See also ==
- List of botanical gardens in Italy
