= Giardino Botanico Trebbo Trebbi =

Botanical garden in Italy

Coordinates: 45°32′N 10°14′E

The Giardino Botanico Trebbo Trebbi is a private botanical garden located at Via Ottaviano Montini, 119, Mompiano, Brescia, Province of Brescia, Lombardy, Italy.

== See also ==
- List of botanical gardens in Italy
