= Giardino dell'Iris =

Botanical garden in Florence, Italy, specializing in the cultivation of iris flowers

Coordinates: 43°45′46.14″N 11°16′0.75″E

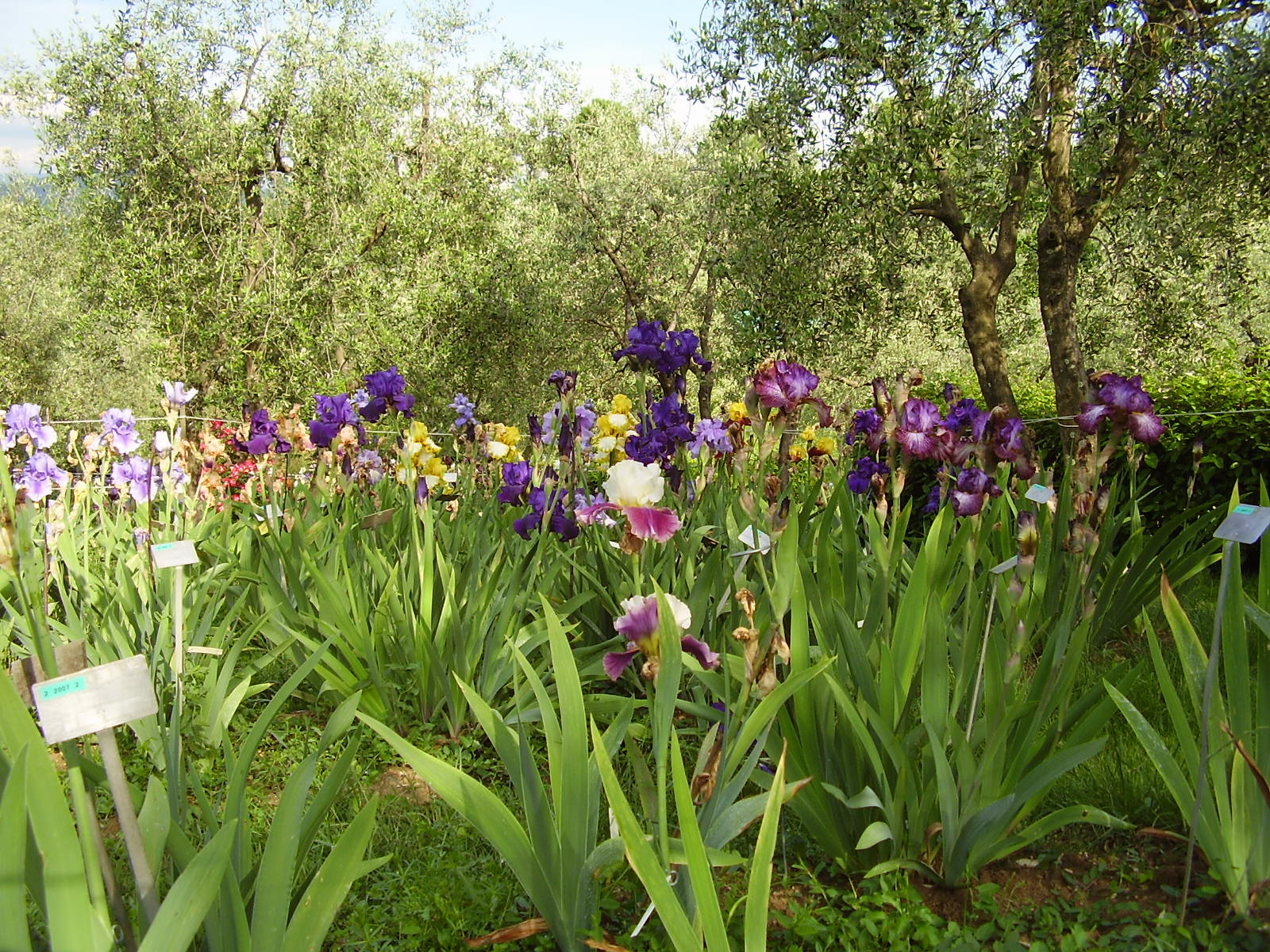
Giardino dell'Iris

Giardino dell'Iris is a botanical garden specializing in the cultivation of iris flowers, symbol of Florence since 1251. It is located on the corner of Viale dei Colli and Piazzale Michelangelo in Florence, Italy, and open daily without charge from May 2–20 every year.

The garden is owned by the Società italiana dell'Iris, who hosted the annual "International dell'Iris" in 1954. Then with help from the local town council, 2 acres of land was made available for the garden. Donations made by many foreign growers including the Presby Memorial Iris Gardens in New Jersey, helped fund the project. Specialists, botanists, hybridizers, horticulturists from various foreign countries visit and work in the Garden for the scientific interest of the Iris. The garden is also open to the public.

To enter, the international Competition for the best varieties of Iris, the 'Premio Firenze', Iris growers and breeders from around the world send their best flowers to the garden from June to September every year, where they are planned and cultivated for 3 years before they are reviewed by an international jury. Winners then get a gold Florin.

It is almost entirely devoted to iris plants, with more than 1,500 (variously 2,500) varieties on display during the annual competition, including the winners of recent years. The garden contains olive groves, a pond is for the cultivation of aquatic varieties and provides an excellent view of Florence and its surrounding hills.

== See also ==
- List of botanical gardens in Italy
