= Orto Botanico dell'Università Politecnica delle Marche =

Botanical garden in Italy

Coordinates: 43°37′01″N 13°31′00″E

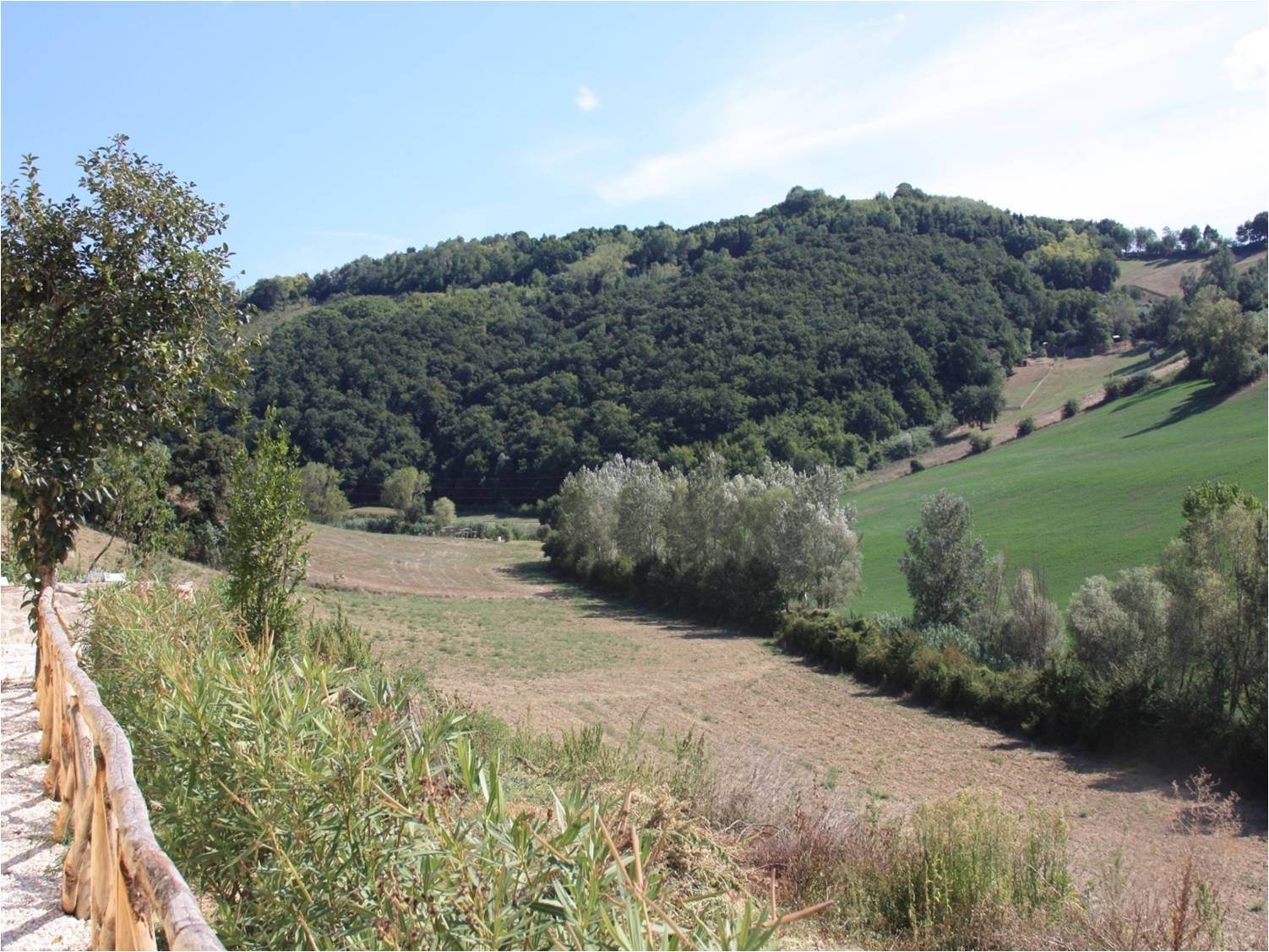
Orto botanico

The Orto Botanico dell'Università Politecnica delle Marche (5 hectares), also known as the Orto Botanico di Ancona and La Selva di Gallignano, is a nature preserve and botanical garden maintained by the Facoltà di Agraria of the Marche Polytechnic University (previously the University of Ancona), and located in Gallignano, Ancona, Province of Ancona, Marche, Italy.

The garden was established in the 1990s on municipal land, and now occupies the northern side of a hill at 100–200 meters altitude. It is a wooded area with wildlife.

== See also ==
- List of botanical gardens in Italy
