= Orto Botanico dell'Università di Siena =

Botanical garden in Liguria, Italy

Coordinates: 43°18′48.77″N 11°19′54.082″E

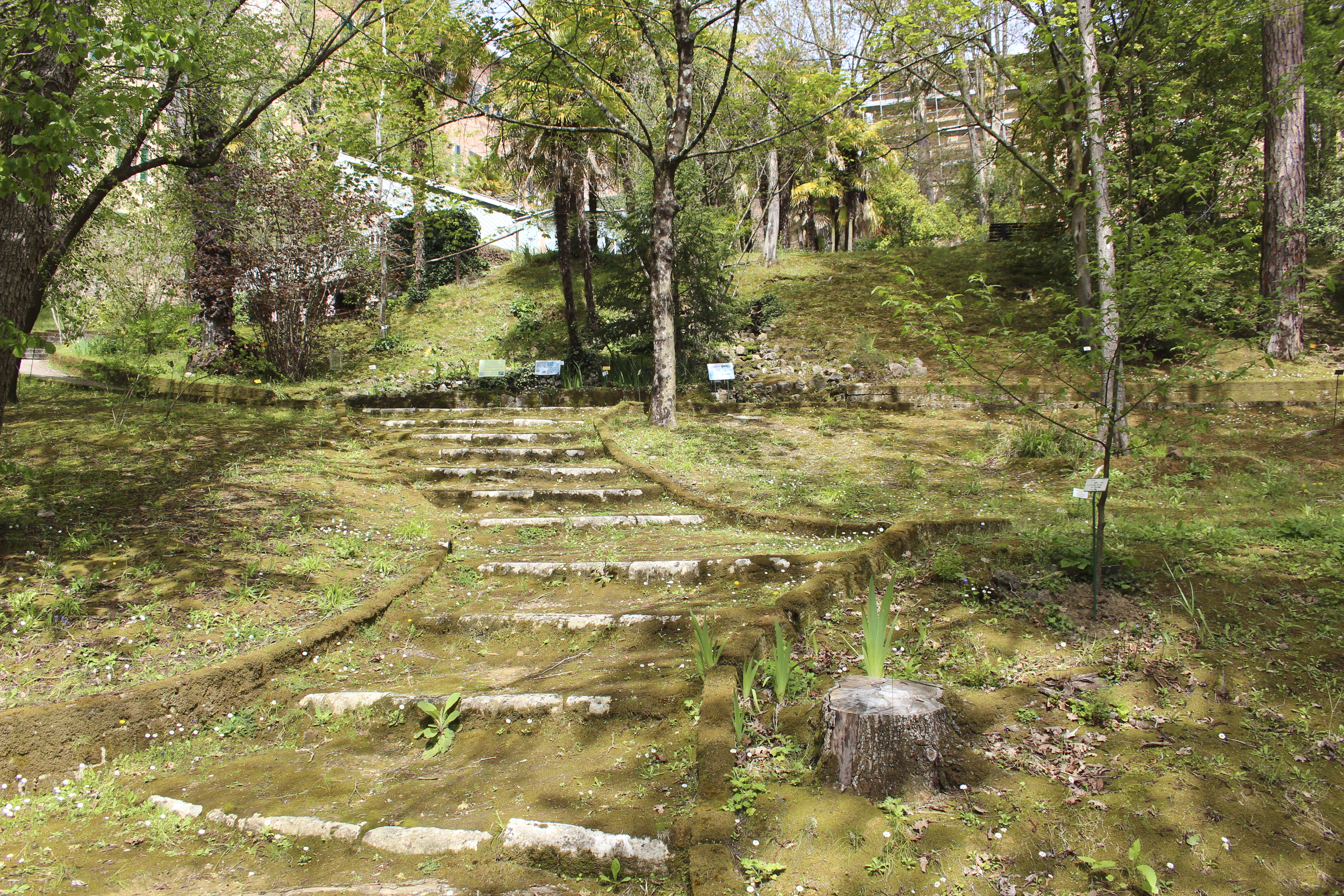
- The Orto Botanico in Siena
- Interactive map of Orto Botanico dell'Università di Siena
- Type: Botanical
- Location: Siena, Tuscany, Italy
- Area: 2.5 hectares (6.2 acres)
- Opened: 1588
- Operator: University of Siena
- Status: Open daily
- Website: orto_botanico.htm

The Orto Botanico dell'Università di Siena (2.5 hectares) is a botanical garden operated by the University of Siena. It is located at Via P. A. Mattioli, 4, Siena, Tuscany, Italy, and open daily.

The garden's history reaches back to 1588 when the university began to raise medicinal herbs. In 1756 the field of herbal studies was supplanted by natural history, and starting in 1759, under the direction of Giuseppe Baldassarri, the garden began to collect uncommon plants. In 1784 the Grand Duke of Tuscany Peter Leopold began a university reform, and in a short time the garden's collection grew to contain more than a thousand new plants, many from abroad. Its first published record ('the Seminum Index Siena') listed some 900 species, including several hundred from outside Italy. In 1856, the garden moved to its present location, the botany institute was constructed in 1910–1912, and in the 1960s the garden's area was doubled.

Today the garden is located inside Siena's city walls, covering one hillside of the valley S. Agostino. Its central collection is arranged in systematic order within brick-bordered, rectangular flower beds, along with old specimens of exotic and local plants. A farm area grows fruit, olive trees and vines of the main Chianti grapes. The garden also contains three greenhouses enclosing a total of about 500 m^{2}, namely, a tropical greenhouse, a tepidarium that houses exotic species in winter as well as a succulent collection (120 m^{2}) organized by country of origin, and an orangery containing carnivorous plants and the principal citrus varieties grown in Europe.

Species endemic to the garden's undeveloped areas include Alyssum bertolonii, Armeria denticulata, Centaurea aplolepa subsp. Carueliana, Euphorbia nicaensis, Stachys recta ssp. serpentinii, and Thymus acicularis var. Ophioliticus.

It has its own Botanical Journal, 'Bullettino de Laboratorio ed Orto Botanico dell'Università di Siena'.

== See also ==
- List of botanical gardens in Italy

== Other sources ==
- Perini C., with Casini S. & Barluzzi C., L'Orto Botanico dell'Università di Siena, Graphicom, Siena, 62 pp, 1990.
