= University of Ferrara Botanic Garden =

Botanical garden n Ferrara, Italy

Coordinates: 44°50′35.66″N 11°37′25.72″E

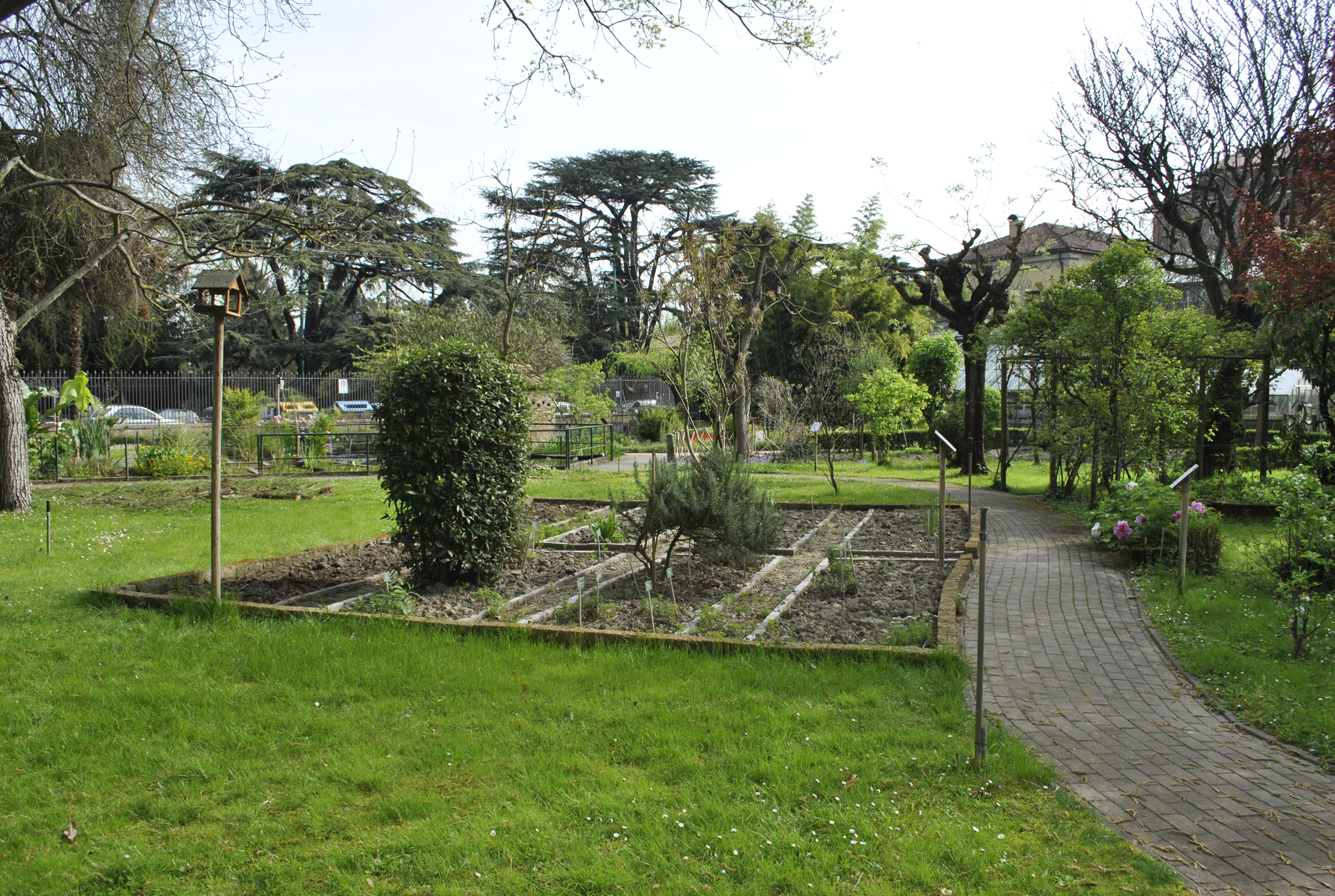
Interior of the Botanical Garden of the University of Ferrara located in the garden of Palazzo Turchi di Bagno.

The University of Ferrara Botanic Garden is a 4,500 square metre botanical garden operated by the University of Ferrara. It is located at Corso Porta Mare, 2b, I-44100 Ferrara, Emilia-Romagna, Italy, and is open weekday mornings. Admission is free.

The university's garden was originally established in 1771 at a location on the via Paradiso, but in 1963 it was moved to its present location. It currently contains about 1300 species in its greenhouse (243 m^{2}), and some 700 species outdoors, arranged into four major sections as follows:

- Systematic - species arranged by botanic classification, with subsections for Pterophyta, Angiospermophyta, Monocotyledons, Dicotyledons
- Exotic plants
- Useful plants - subsections for fruits, medicinal plants, aromatic plants, and miscellaneous
- Theme gardens - ornamental plants in an aquatic garden, English garden, Italian garden, Japanese garden, Mediterranean garden, rock garden, and shade garden.

== See also ==
- List of botanical gardens in Italy
