= Orto Botanico Friulano =

Botanical garden in Italy

The Orto Botanico Friulano is a botanical garden at a location variously described as near the Istituto Tecnico per Geometri on Viale Leonardo da Vinci, or Via Urbanis, Udine, Friuli-Venezia Giulia, Italy.

The garden was established in 1951 and contains collections of irises, local flora, Ericaceae, succulents, ferns, arid and desert plants, tropical trees, and Platanus orientalis. The garden's herbarium, housed within the Museo Friulano di Storia Natural, contains about 100,000 specimens.

== See also ==
- List of botanical gardens in Italy
