= Arboreto Mediterraneo del Limbara =

Botanical garden in Italy

Coordinates: 40°50′59″N 9°10′31″E

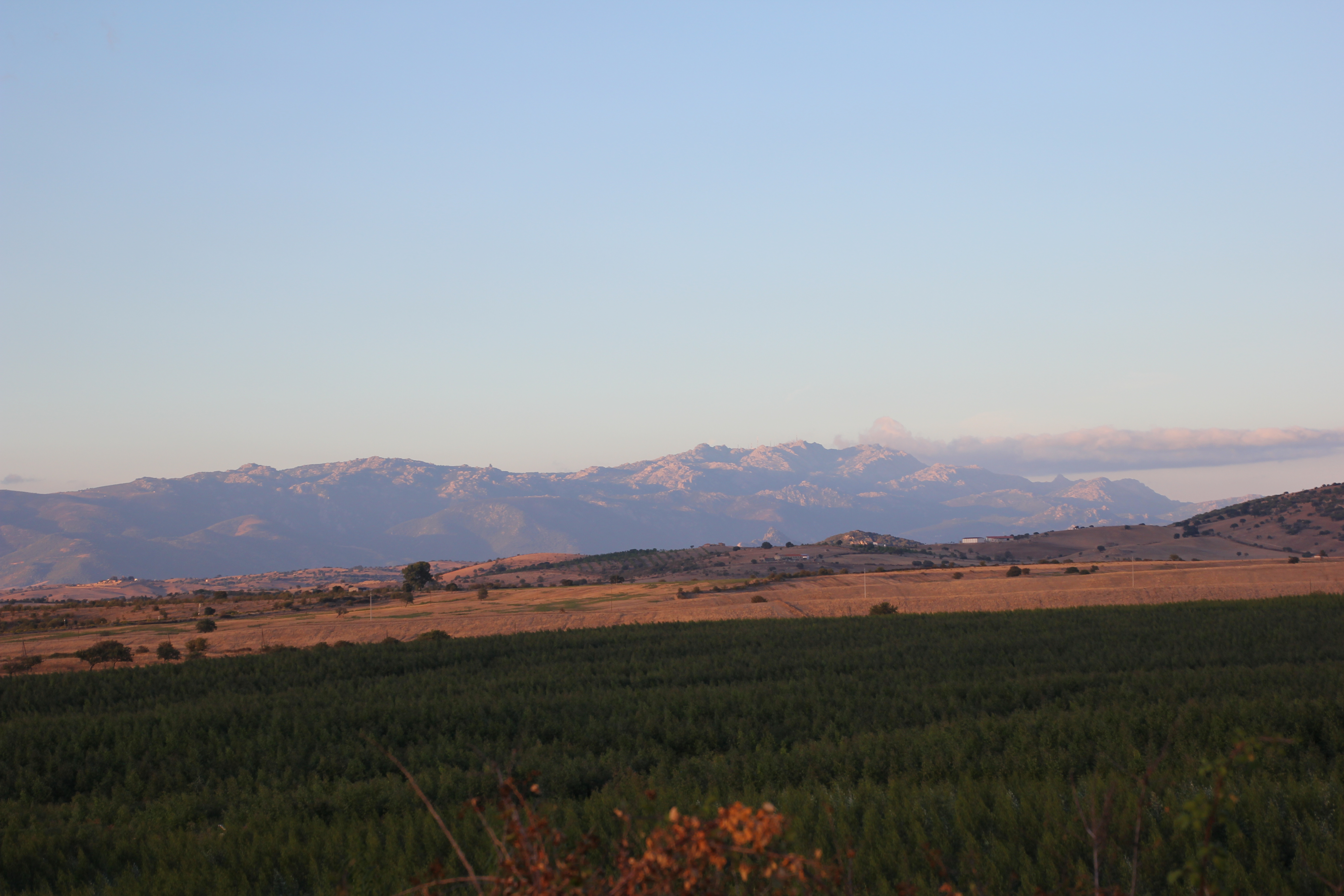
Arboreto Mediterraneo del Limbara

The Arboreto Mediterraneo del Limbara (about 80 hectares) is an arboretum located within the Foresta Demaniale di Monte Limbara Sud, at Via Roma, 62, Sassari, Sardinia, Italy. The arboretum's mission is to collect and preserve species native to the Mediterranean region. It contains walking paths.

== See also ==
- List of botanical gardens in Italy
