= Orto Botanico Conservativo Carlo Spegazzini =

Botanical garden in Italy

Coordinates: 45°40′N 12°15′E

The Orto Botanico Conservativo Carlo Spegazzini (1500 m^{2}), also called the Giardino Conservativo Spegazzini, is a botanical garden operated by the Accademia Trevigiana per il Territorio, and located at viale de Coubertin 15, Treviso, Veneto, Italy. It is open daily.

The garden was established in 1995, and named in honor of local botanist Carlo Spegazzini, with a mission to preserve native species, crops, and environments for experimental study. It currently contains over 500 plants representing about 30 species, organized into the following zones: a hedge; collection of Prunus species; traditional vines and mulberry trees; and two ponds.

== See also ==
- List of botanical gardens in Italy
