= List of gardens in Italy =

This is a list of gardens in Italy. The Italian garden is stylistically based on symmetry, axial geometry and on the principle of imposing order over nature. It influenced the history of gardening, especially French gardens and English gardens. The Italian garden was influenced by Roman gardens and Italian Renaissance gardens.

== A ==
- Arboreto di Arco
- Arboreto Pascul
- Arboretum Apenninicum

== B ==
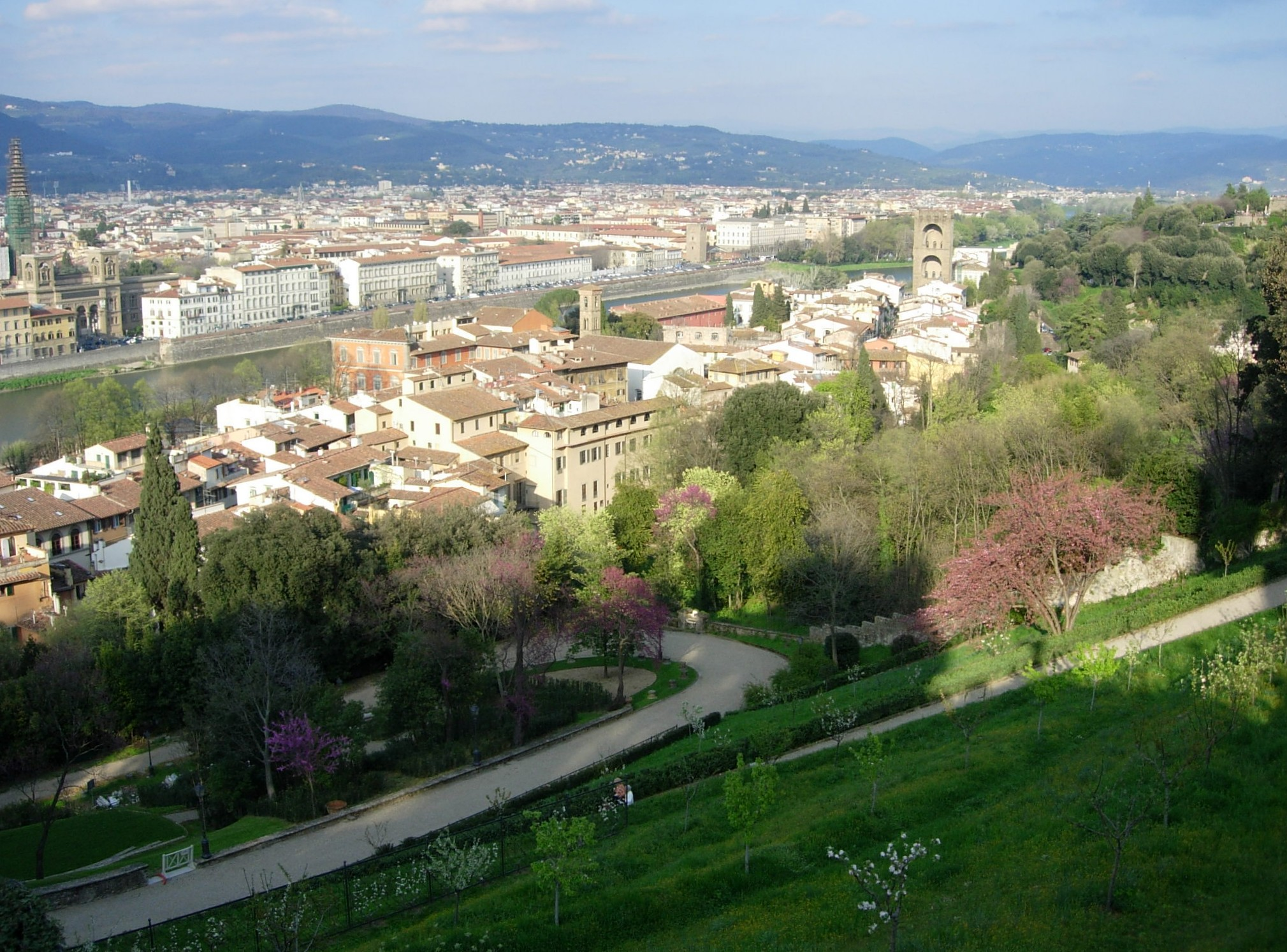
Bardini Gardens

- Bardini Gardens
- Biennale Gardens
- Boboli Gardens

== C ==
- Cortile del Belvedere

== D ==
- Ducal Palace of Colorno
- Ducal Palace of Sassuolo

== F ==
- Farnese Gardens
- La Foce

== G ==
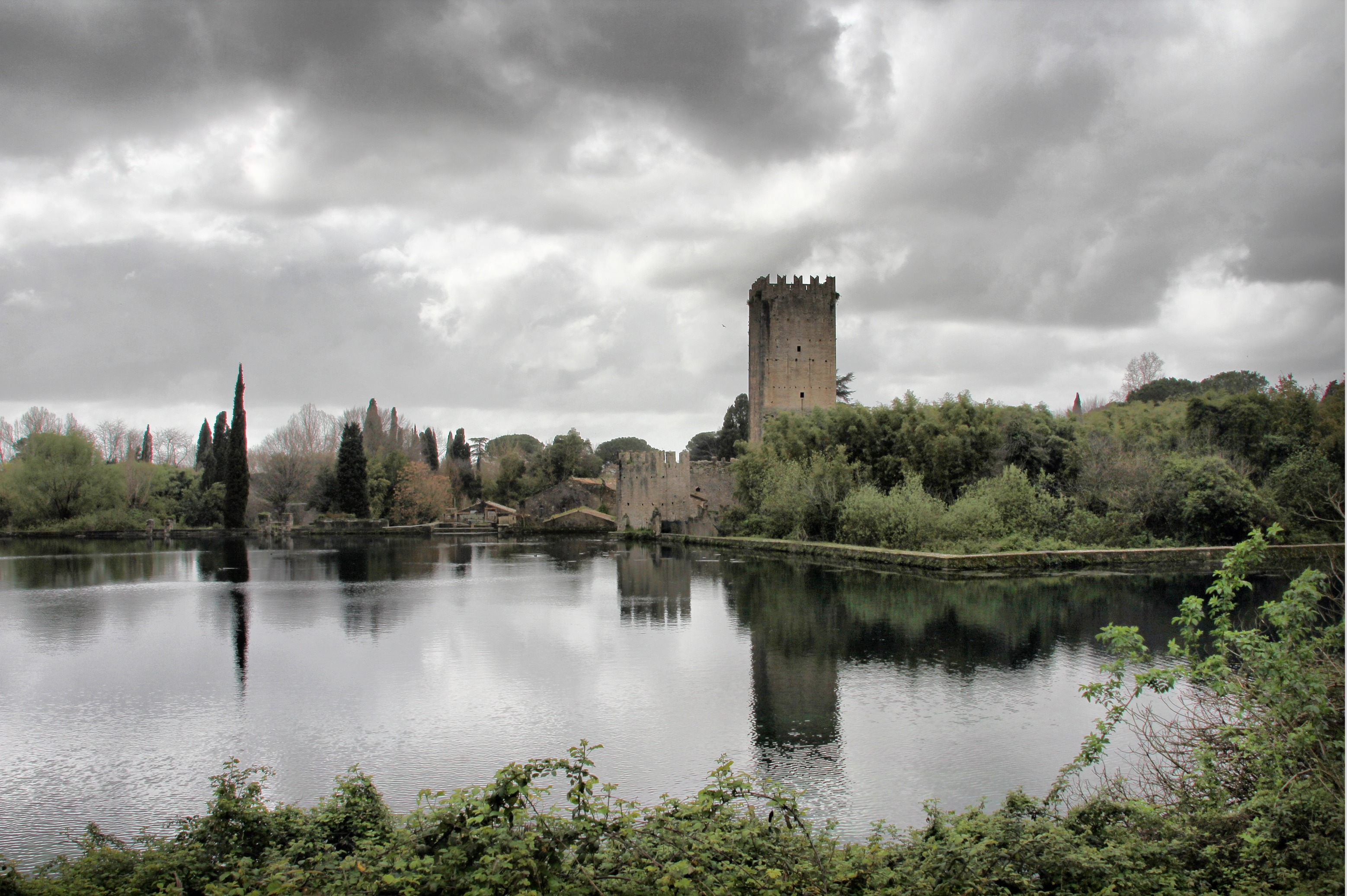
Garden of Ninfa

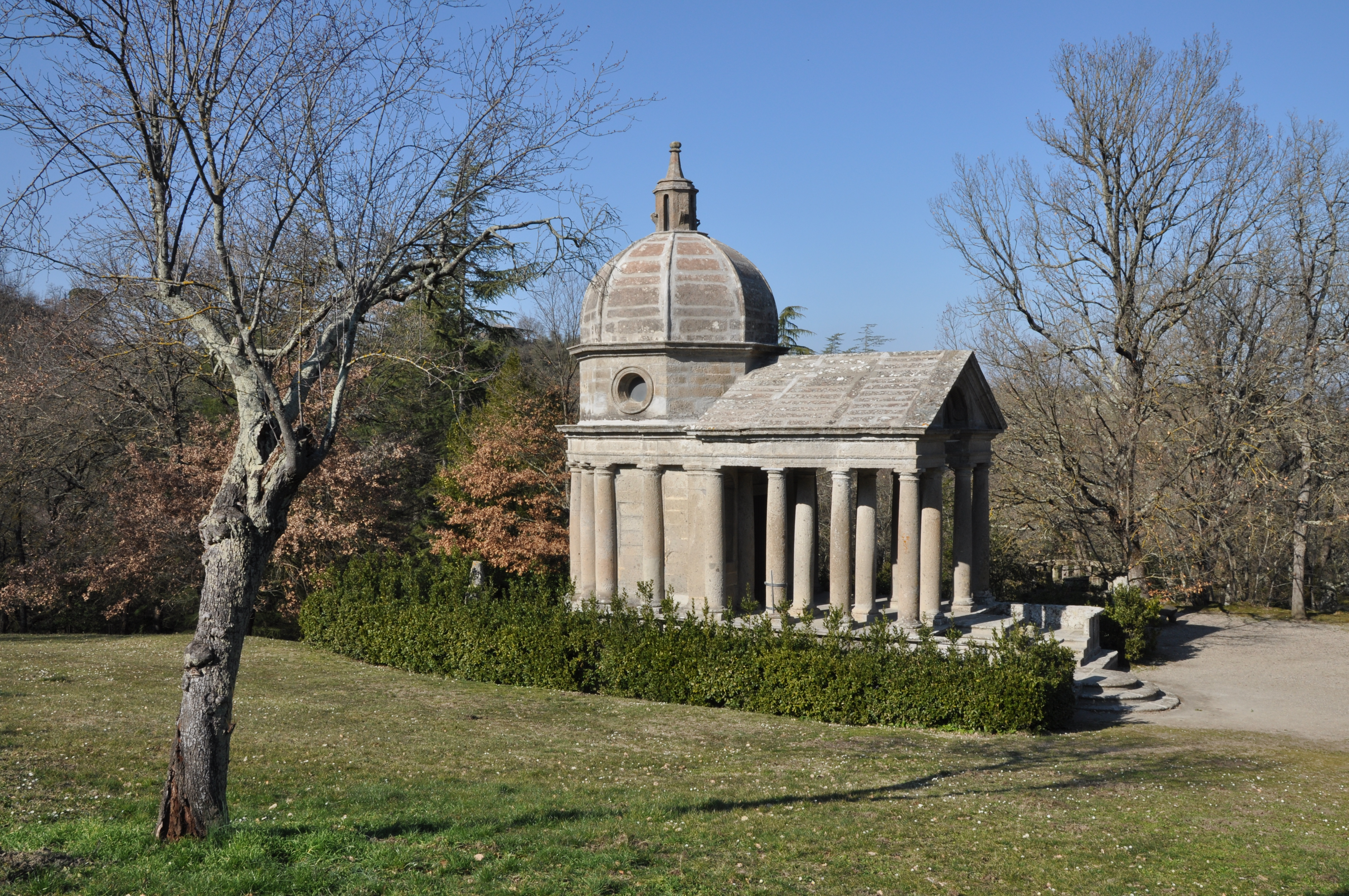
Gardens of Bomarzo

- Garden of Eden
- Garden of Ninfa
- Gardens of Augustus
- Gardens of Bomarzo
- Gardens of Lucullus
- Gardens of Maecenas
- Giardini della Biennale
- Giardini della rotonda di Padova
- Giardini Papadopoli
- Giardini Ravino
- Giardino Alpino "Antonio Segni"
- Giardino dei Semplici
- Giardino dell'Iris
- Giardino delle Rose
- Giardino Montano dell' Orecchiella
- Giardino Montano Linasia

== I ==
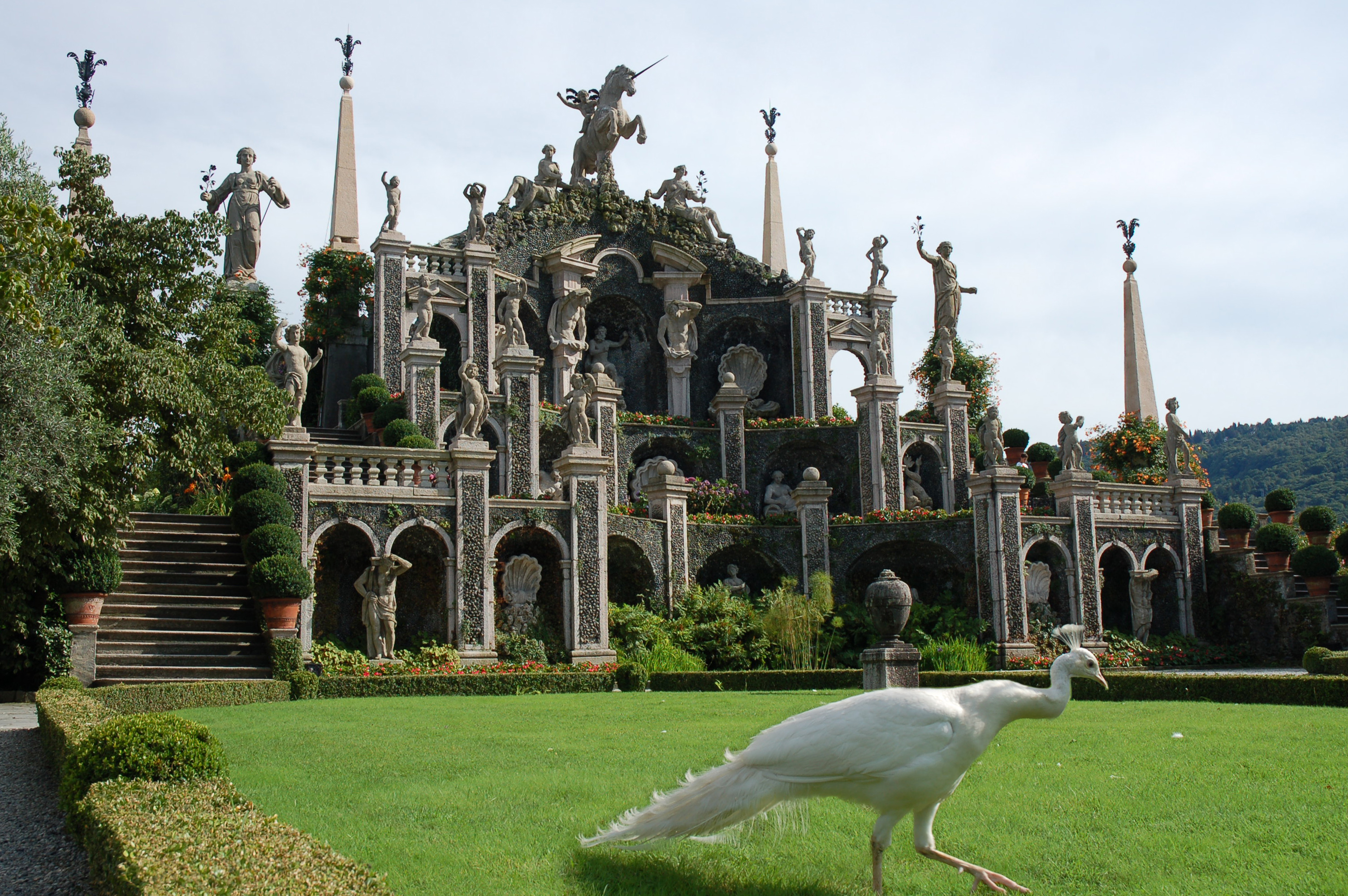
The gardens of Isola Bella

- Isola Bella (Lago Maggiore)
- Isola del Garda
- Isola Madre

== L ==
- Lowe Gardens

== M ==
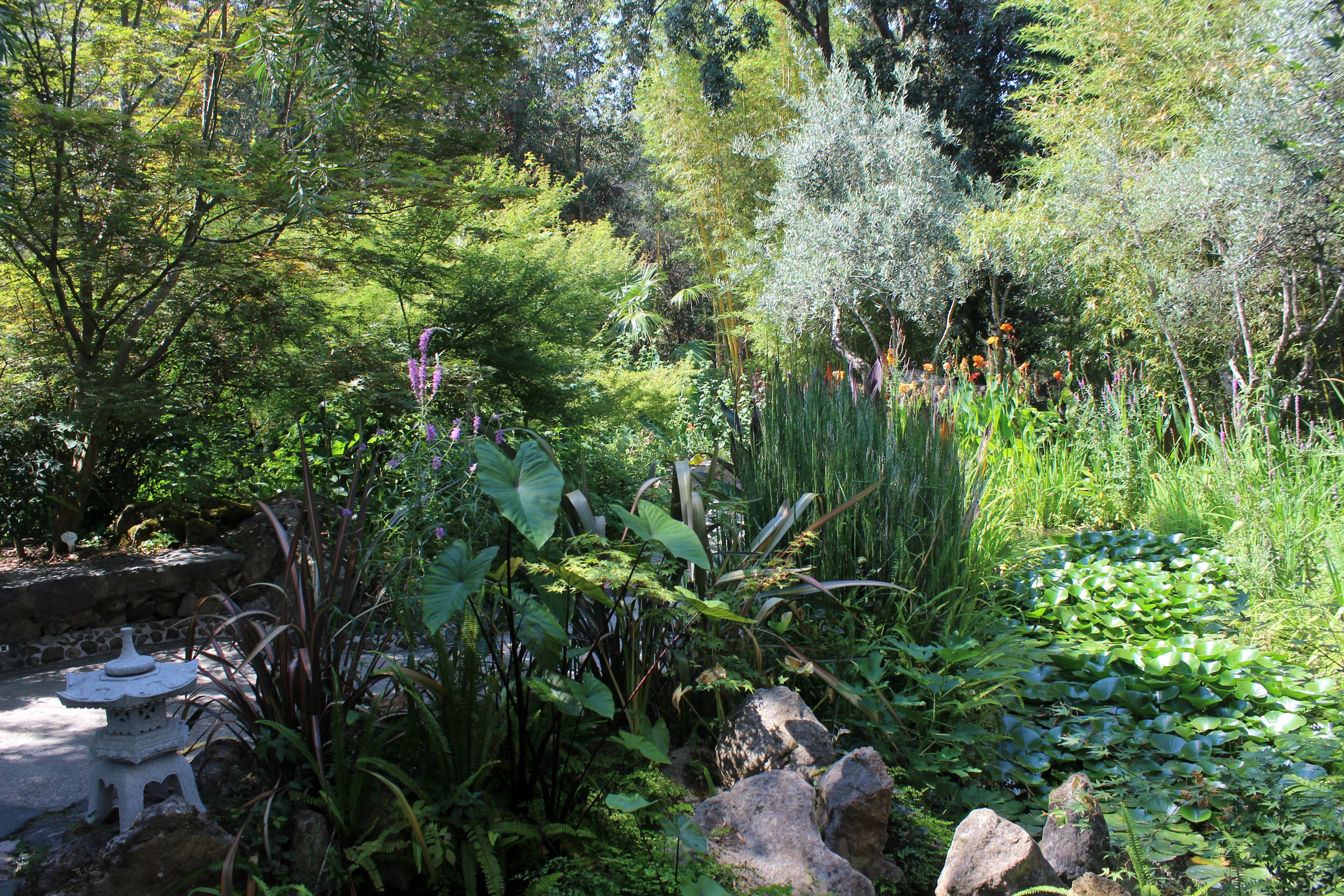
La Mortella

- Minerva's Garden
- Moreno Gardens
- La Mortella

== O ==
- Orange Garden

== P ==
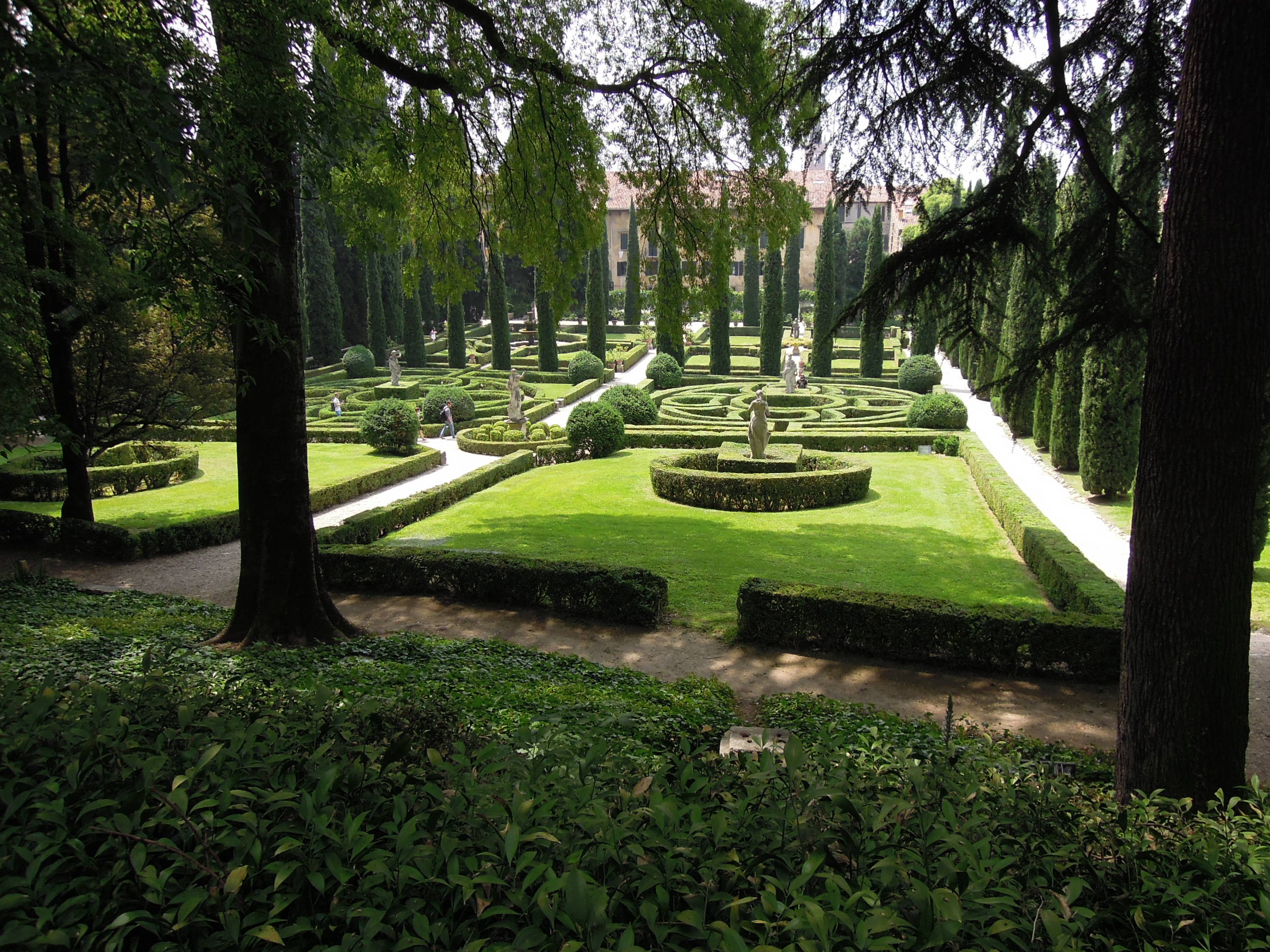
Gardens of the Palazzo Giusti

- Palace of Portici
- Palazzo Giusti
- Palazzo Pfanner
- Pallanca exotic gardens
- Parco Giardino Sigurtà
- Park of the Monsters
- The Parks of Genoa

== R ==
- Royal Palace of Caserta

== T ==
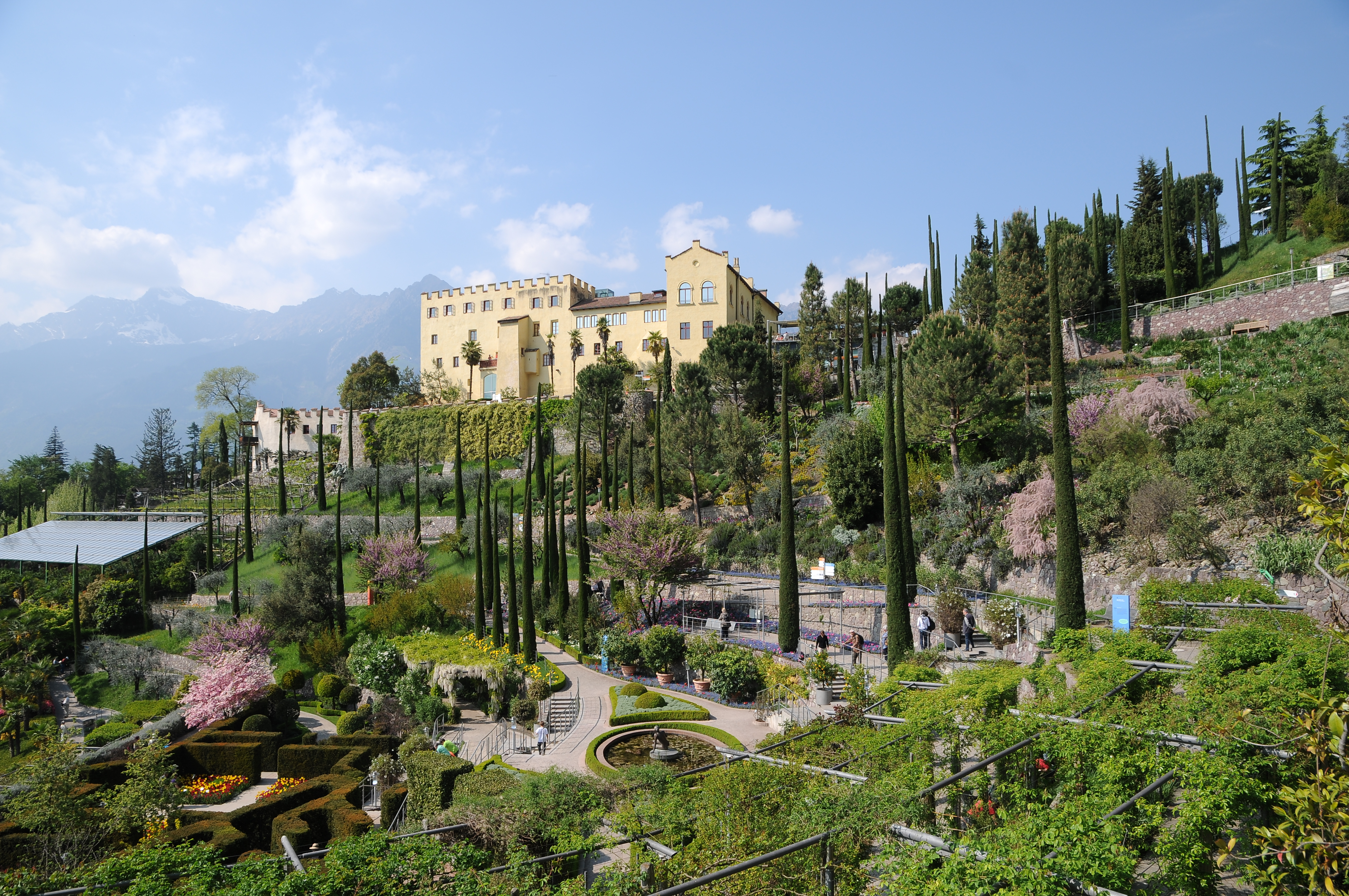
Trauttmansdorff Castle Gardens

- Tarot Garden
- Torrecchia Vecchia
- Trauttmansdorff Castle Gardens

== V ==
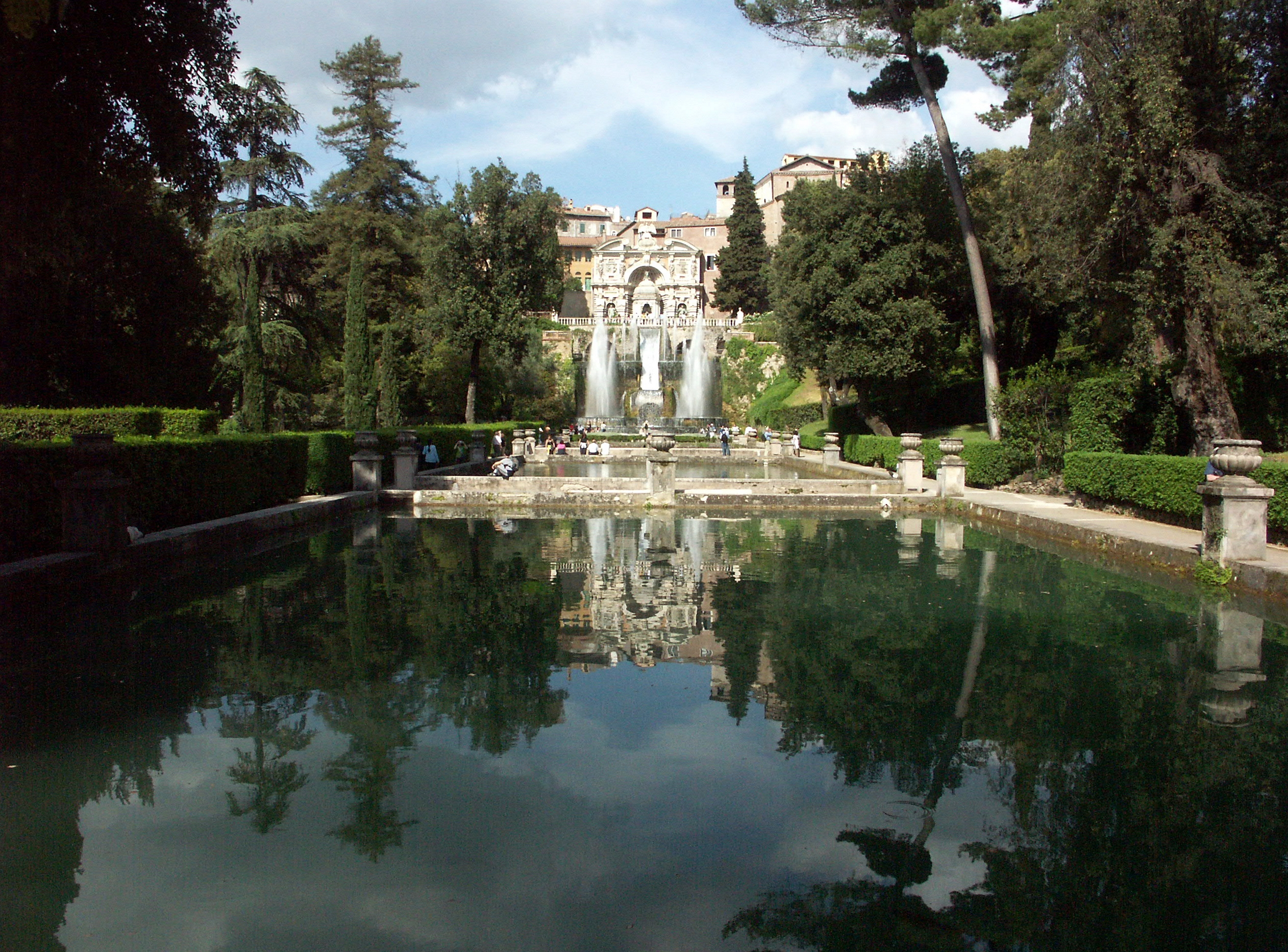
Villa d'Este

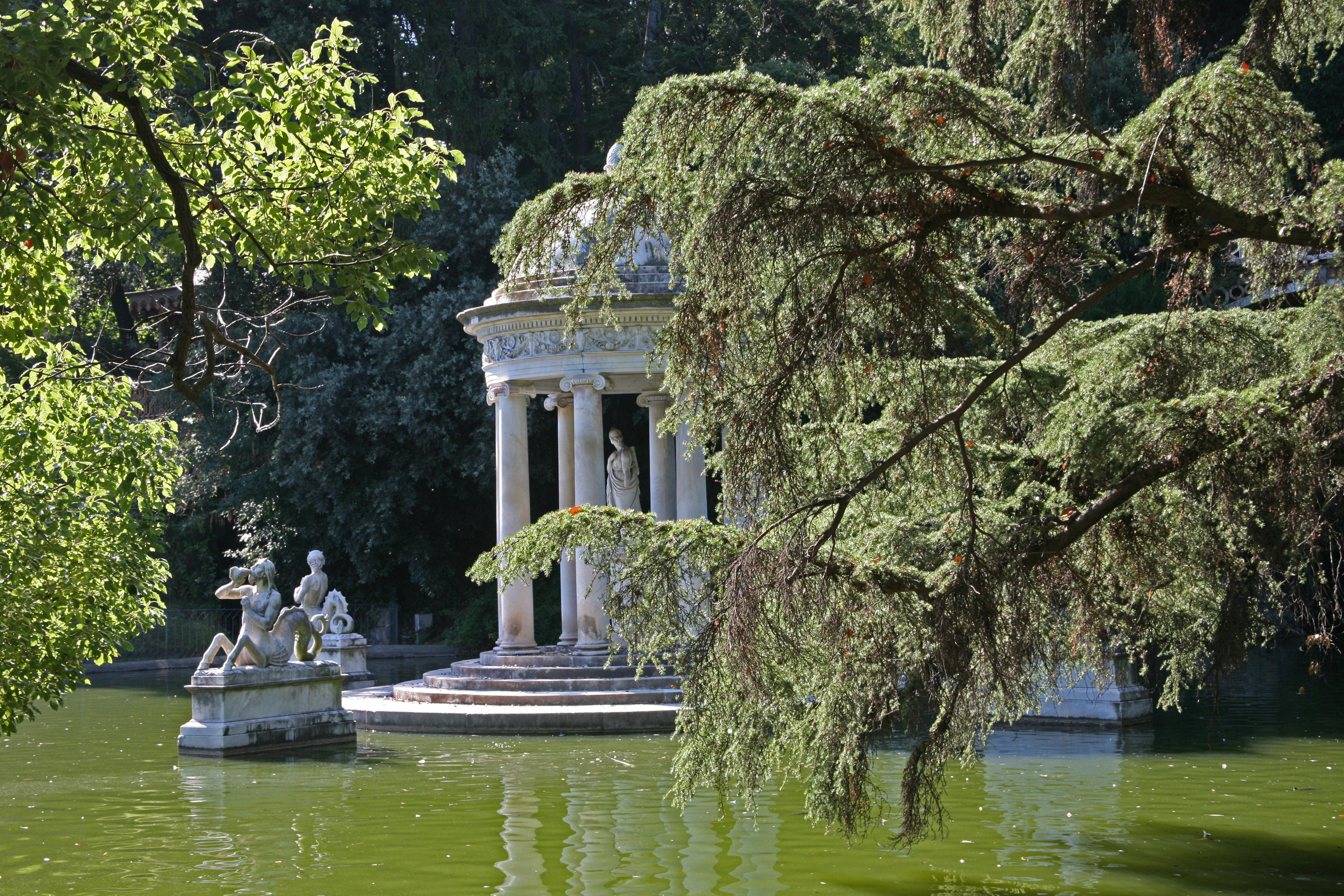
Villa Durazzo-Pallavicini

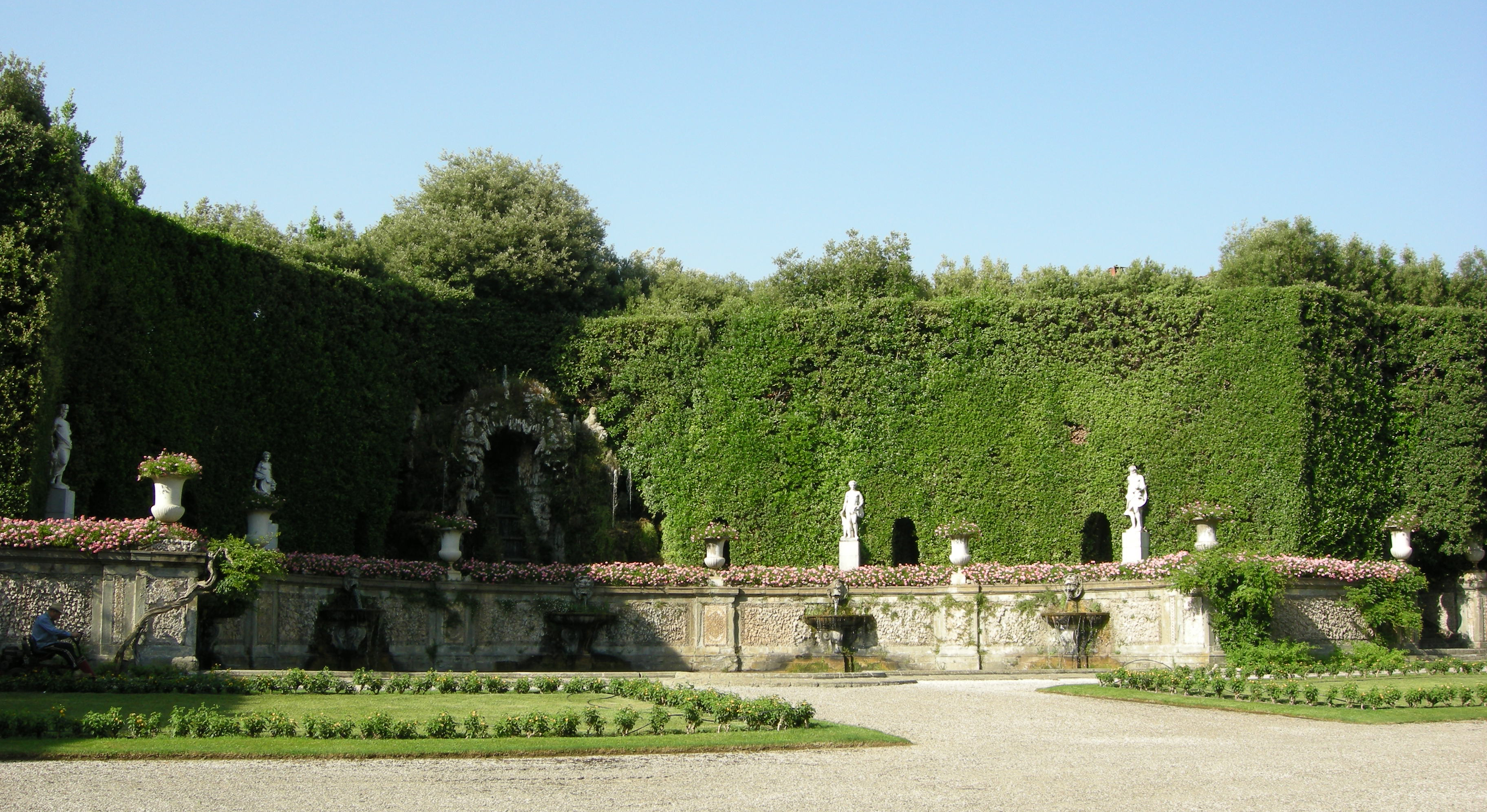
Villa Marlia

- Varramista Gardens
- Villa Aldobrandini
- Villa Arrighetti
- Villa Barbarigo (Valsanzibio)
- Villa Borghese gardens
- Villa Carlotta
- Villa Cetinale
- Villa Cicogna Mozzoni
- Villa Cimbrone
- Villa d'Este
- Villa del Balbianello
- Villa Della Porta Bozzolo
- Villa di Castello
- Villa di Corliano
- Villa di Pratolino
- Villa di Quarto
- Villa Durazzo-Pallavicini
- Villa Gamberaia
- Villa Lancellotti
- Villa Lante
- Villa Ludovisi
- Villa Marlia
- Villa Massei
- Villa Medici at Cafaggiolo
- Villa Medici at Careggi
- Villa Medici in Fiesole
- Villa Palmieri
- Villa San Michele

== W ==
- Winter Gardens

== See also ==
- List of botanical gardens in Italy
- List of Grandi Giardini Italiani
- List of garden types
- Giardino all'italiana
- Italian Renaissance garden
