= List of Grandi Giardini Italiani =

Grandi Giardini Italiani
- Location: Italy and Malta
- Opened: 1997; 29 years ago
- Website: www.grandigiardini.it

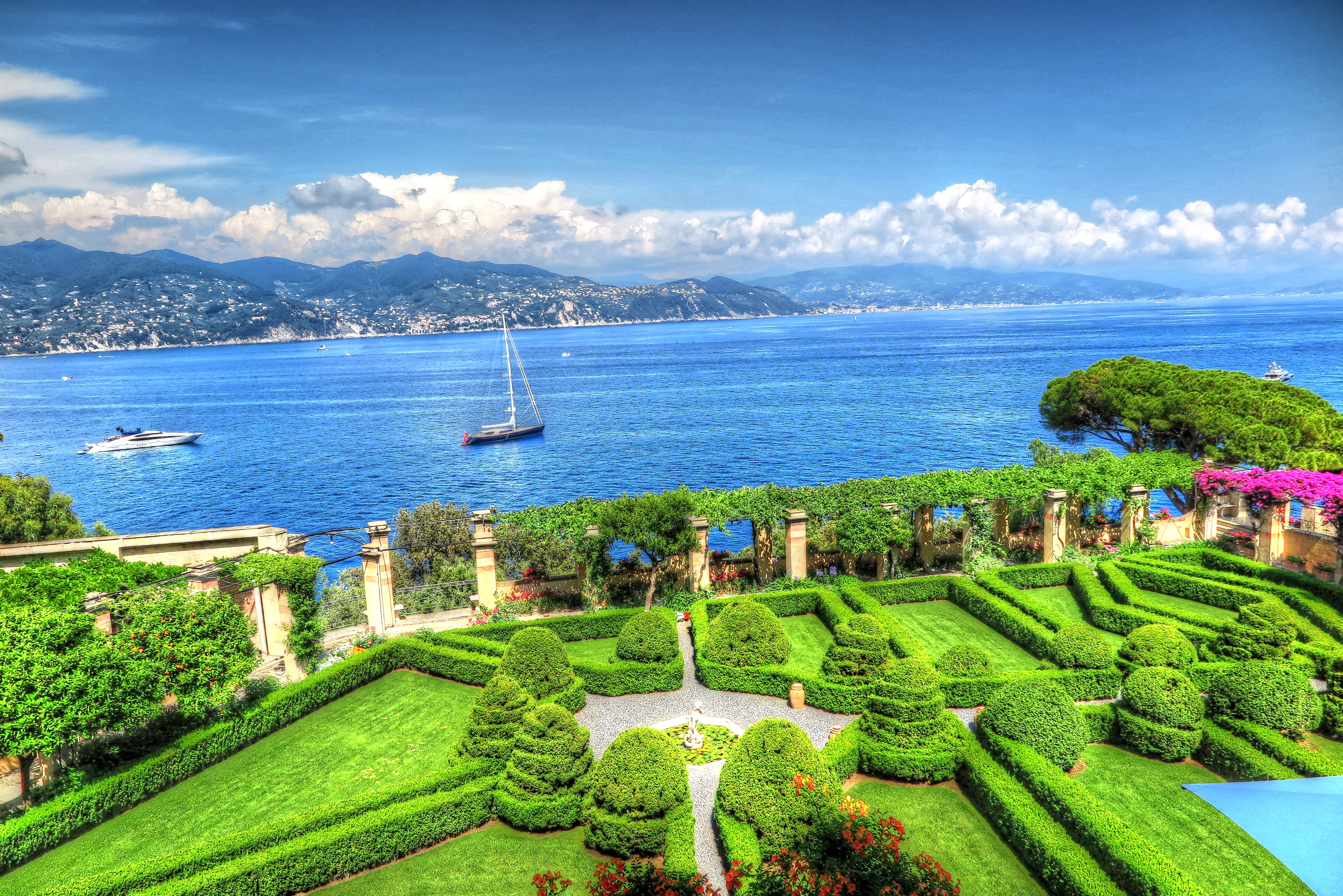
Giardino all'italiana Cervara Abbey, Santa Margherita Ligure

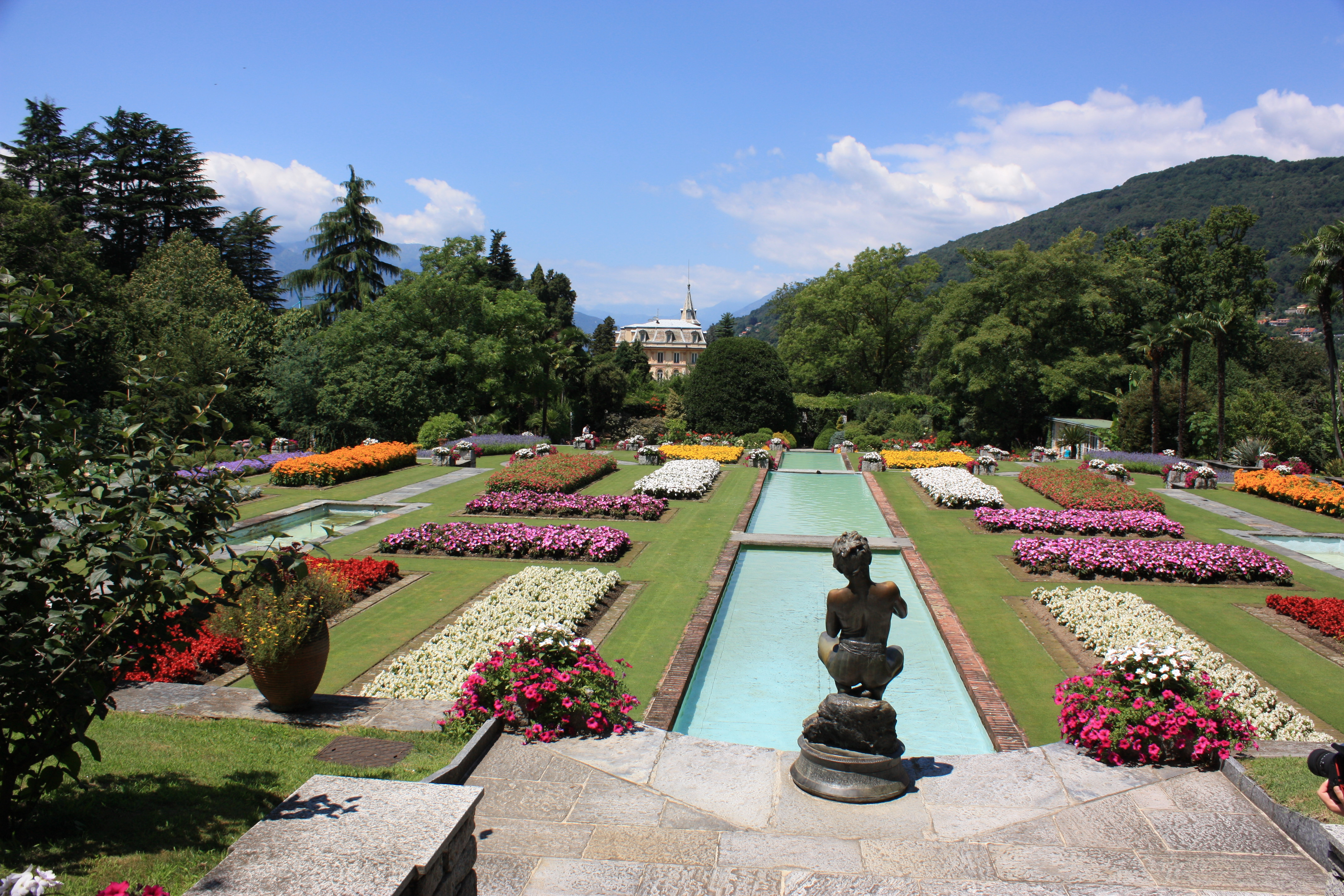
Giardini Botanici Villa Taranto

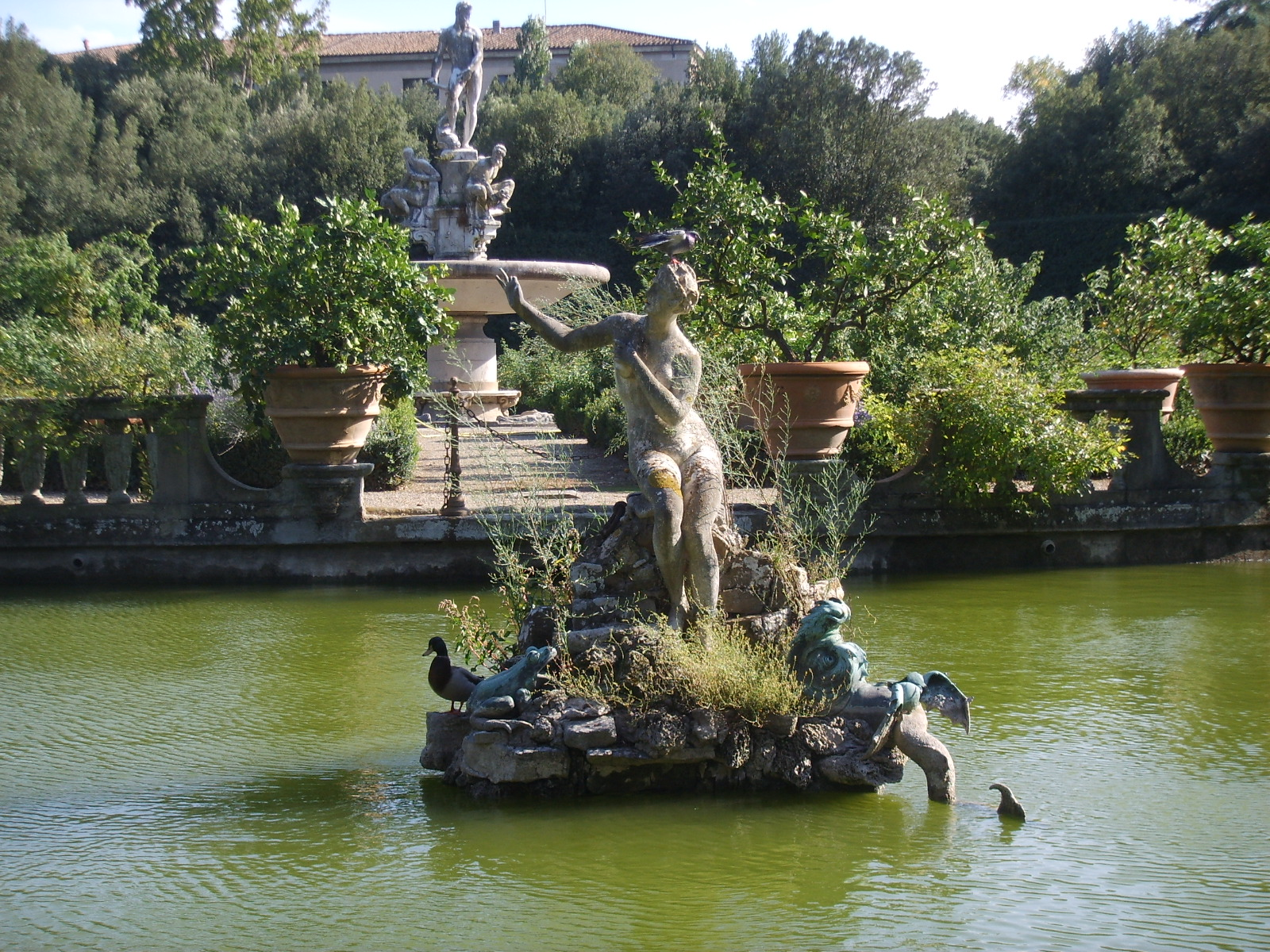
Boboli Gardens

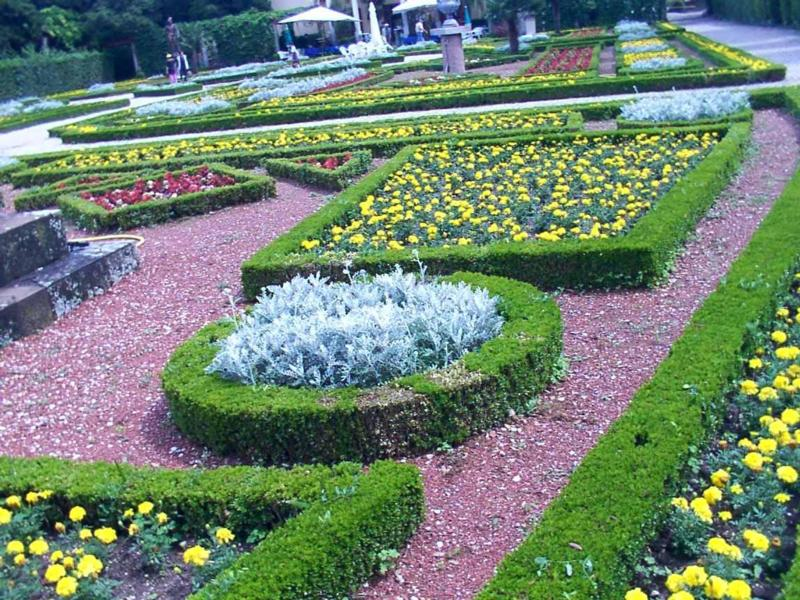
Parco del Castello di Miramare

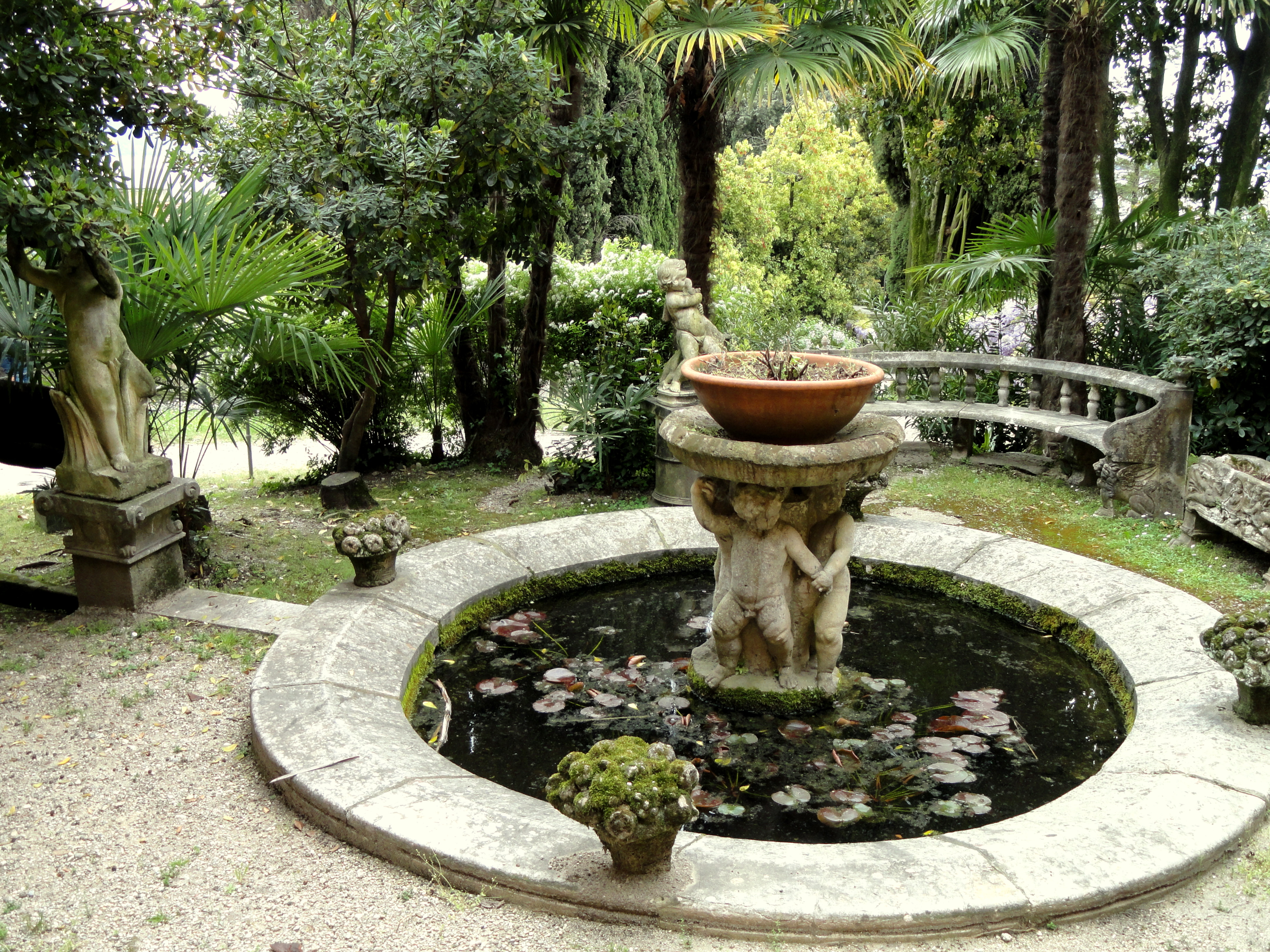
Vittoriale degli Italiani

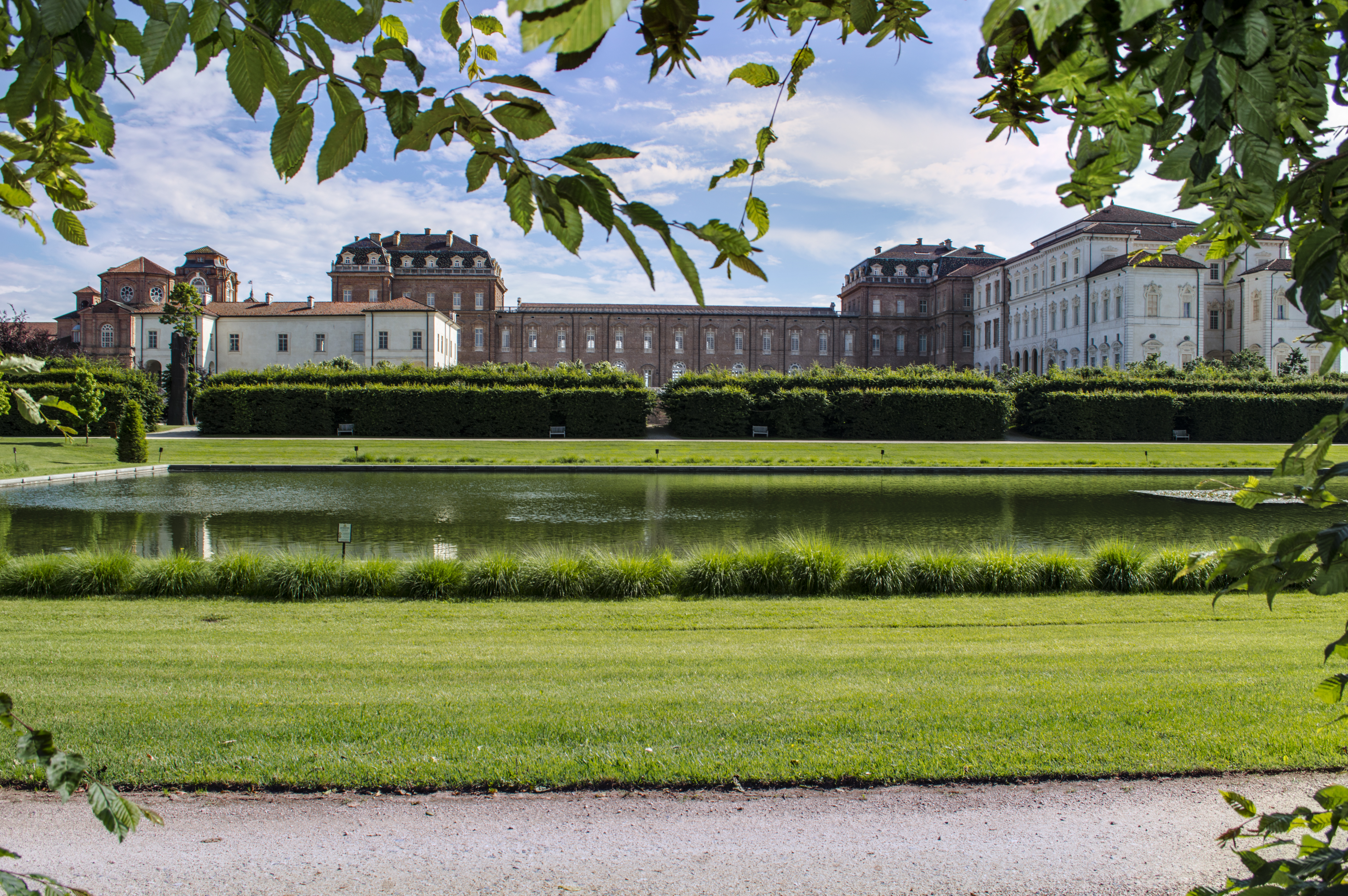
Palace of Venaria

The Grandi Giardini Italiani is an association of major gardens in Italy and Malta founded in 1997. Its members include some of the most important gardens in Italy and Malta.

== List of member gardens ==
- Fondazione Pompeo Mariani (Imperia)
- Giardini Botanici di Stigliano (Rome)
- Giardini Botanici di Villa Taranto (Verbania)
- Giardini Botanici Caneva (Sarzana)
- Giardini Botanici Hanbury (Ventimiglia)
- Giardini della Landriana (Rome)
- Giardini delle mura (Verona)
- Giardini La Mortella (Naples)
- Giardino Barbarigo Pizzoni Ardemani (Padua)
- Giardino Bardini (Florence)
- Giardino del Balio (Erice)
- Giardino dell'Hotel Cipriani (Venice)
- Giardino di Boboli (Florence)
- Giardino di Ninfa (Latina)
- Giardino di Palazzo del Principe
- Giardino di Villa Gamberaia (Firenze)
- Giardino Ducale di Parma
- Giardino Esotico Pallanca (Imperia)
- Giardino Giusti (Verona)
- Giardino Storico Garzoni (Pistoia)
- Gardens of Trauttmansdorff Castle (Merano)
- Giardino del Biviere (Siracusa)
- La Cervara, Abbazia di San Girolamo al Monte di Portofino (Santa Margherita Ligure)
- Museo Giardino della Rosa Antica (Modena)
- Museo Nazionale di Villa Nazionale Pisani (Venezia)
- Oasi di Porto (Roma)
- Orto Botanico dell'Università di Catania
- Orto botanico di Palermo
- Palace of Venaria
- Palazzo Fantini (Forlì)
- Palazzo Giusti (Verona)
- Palazzo Parisio (Malta)
- Palazzo Patrizi (Roma)
- Parco Botanico di San Liberato (Roma)
- Parco del Castello di Miramare (Trieste)
- Parco della Villa Pallavicino (Verbania)
- Parco della Villa Reale di Marlia (Lucca)
- Parco di Palazzo Coronini Cronberg (Gorizia)
- Parco di Palazzo Malingri di Bagnolo (Cuneo)
- Parco di Pinocchio (Pistoia)
- Parco Giardino Sigurtà (Verona)
- Parco Idrotermale del Negombo (Napoli)
- Parco Paternò del Toscano (Catania)
- Parco Storico Seghetti Panichi (Ascoli Piceno)
- Serraglio di Villa Fracazan Piovene (Vicenza)
- Varramista Gardens (Pisa)
- Villa Arvedi (Verona)
- Villa Borromeo Visconti Litta (Milano)
- Villa Carlotta (Como)
- Villa del Balbianello (Como)
- Villa Della Porta Bozzolo (Varese)
- Villa d'Este (Como)
- Villa d'Este (Tivoli)
- Villa di Geggiano (Siena)
- Villa Durazzo (Santa Margherita Ligure, Genoa)
- Villa Erba (Cernobbio)
- Villa Farnese di Caprarola (Viterbo)
- Villa Grabau (Lucca)
- Villa La Babina (Imola)
- Villa La Pescigola (Massa)
- Villa Lante (Viterbo)
- Villa Melzi d'Eril (Como)
- Villa Montericco Pasolini (Imola)
- Villa Novare Bertani (Verona)
- Villa Oliva-Buonvisi (Lucca)
- Villa Peyron al Bosco di Fontelucente (Firenze)
- Villa Pisani Bolognesi Scalabrin (Padova)
- Villa Poggio Torselli (Firenze)
- Villa San Michele (Capri)
- Villa Saluzzo Serra (Nervi, Genoa)
- Villa Trento Da Schio (Vicenza)
- Villa Trissino Marzotto (Vicenza)
- Villa Vignamaggio (Firenze)
- Vittoriale degli Italiani (Brescia)

== See also ==
- Giardino all'italiana
- List of gardens in Italy

== Bibliography ==
- Official website (in italian)
- Judith Wade, Grandi Giardini Italiani, Rizzoli, 2002. ISBN 978-88-7423-010-5.
- Giorgio Mondadori (editor), Guida Gardenia - Grandi Giardini Italiani, Gardenia di Giugno.
- Petilli Oreste, Pallavicini Mimma, Guida ai Grandi Giardini Italiani, Edizioni Living International, 2005. ISBN 88-901778-9-6.
