= Panichi =

Panichi may refer to:

- Borgo Storico Seghetti Panichi, historic site in Italy
- Dave Panichi, Australian jazz trombonist
- Villino Panichi, villa in Grosseto, Italy
