= Villa San Remigio =

Villa San Remigio is a Lombard baroque style building. It stands at the highest point of the Castagnola promontory in Pallanza, within a large park, bordered to the south by the Romanesque church of San Remigio, and to the north by the gardens of Villa Taranto.

== History ==
The villa dates back to the late 1800s, commissioned by the Irish painter Sophie Browne and the poet and musician Silvio Della Valle di Casanova. The couple inherited from the Irish diplomat Peter Browne, Sophie's grandfather, the entire property on the top of the Castagnola, where between 1903 and 1905, they had a pre-existing Swiss-style chalet transformed and expanded by architect Pompeo Azari into a Lombard baroque style villa. In 1916 the extensive estate inherited was radically changed. The once steep and rocky park was remodeled with large garden terraces.

To complete the dream of the couple, a plaque was displayed at the entrance proclaims that the villa is the concrete realization of a dream that they had begun to follow together as teenagers, the villa gave hospitality and inspiration to Gabriele D'Annunzio, Isolde Kurz, Richard Voss, Georg Brandes, pianists Emil Von Sauer, Wilhelm Kempff, the composer Hugo Wolf and Ferruccio Busoni who was portrayed by Umberto Boccioni in San Remigio.

The villa remained the property of the same family until 1977, when the complex was sold by the Countess Ester Della Valle Bonacossa to the Piedmont regional government.

== Description ==
=== Villa ===
The villa has an articulated plan: characterized by large halls decorated with portals, cornices, fireplaces, wooden ceilings and rich furnishings. The most important rooms are the arms and music rooms; the Gothic room and the humanistic study are located around the main hall. Distinctive element of the Villa are the balconies: located to the north-east and south-east, overlooking Lago Maggiore, they are supported by a rock gallery with a portico which acts as a winter garden. The Lombard baroque style facades highlight the significant dimensions of the cornice and windows surmounted by triangular and curvilinear tympanums.

=== Park ===
Immersed in the eight hectares of park there are: the art studio of 1896, the stables, the concierge and the family chapel, built on the cliff in 1898, later sold, now housing a private residence. The park consists of gardens with rooms and terraces, in various styles, Italian, English, medieval and orchard. Various narrow passages lead into themed gardens: of the Hours, of Letizia, of Happiness, of Mestizia, of Memories and finally in that of Sighs, which has a mosaic exedra in the center with seven niches adorned with statues of mythological divinities.
