= Giardini Botanici di Stigliano =

Botanical gardens in Italy

Coordinates: 42°8′N 12°6′E

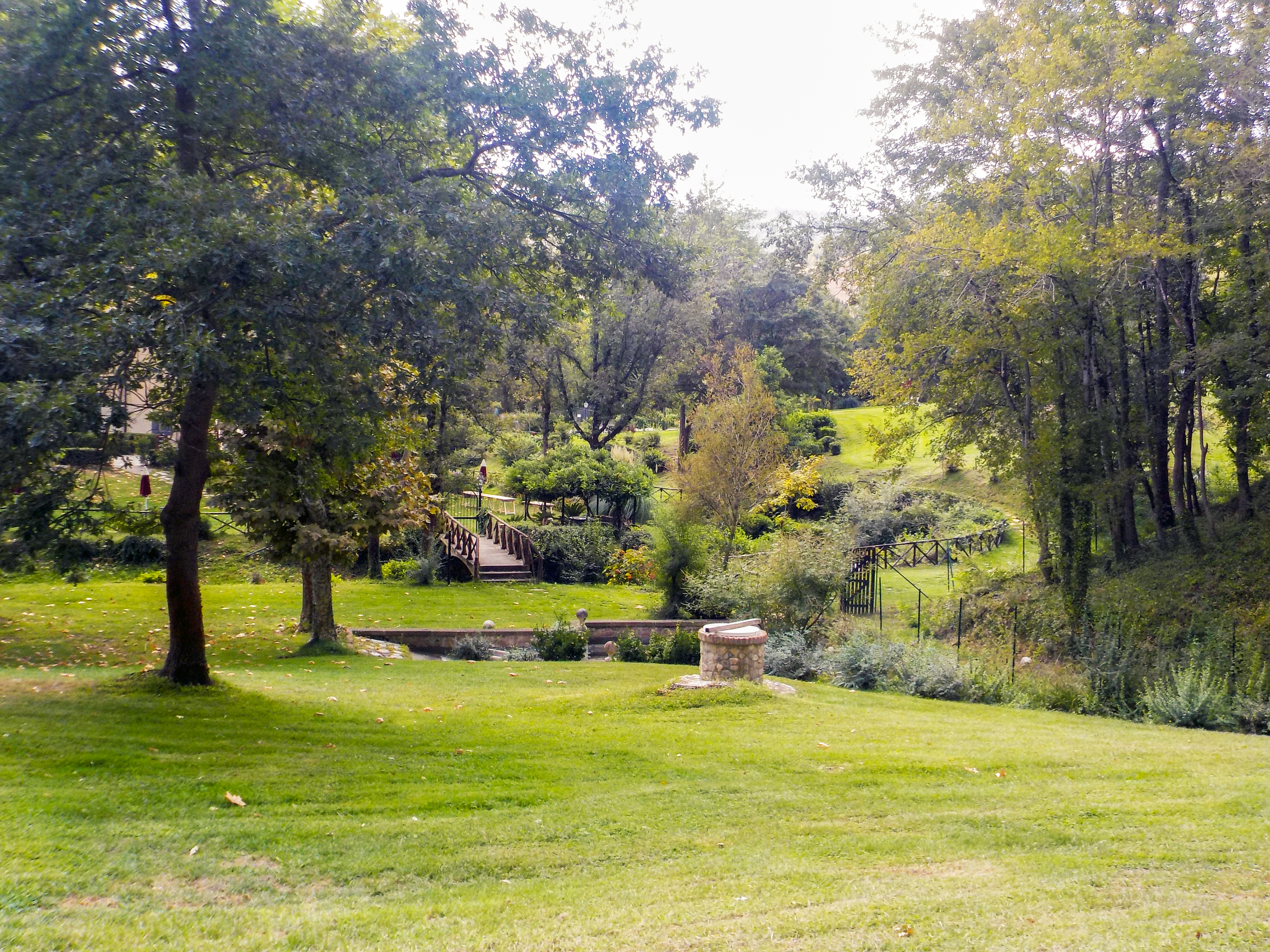
Giardini Botanici di Stigliano

The Giardini Botanici di Stigliano are botanical gardens located in Canale Monterano, province of Rome, Latium, central Italy. They form a part of the Grandi Giardini Italiani.

The sulphur springs themselves have been known since Etruscan times, and named Acquae Stygianae by the Romans. The hotel parkland extends across 20 hectares, and contain the ruins of Roman thermal baths, as well as bamboo, hazel trees, maples, oaks, Roman pines, tamarisks, and fauna including falcons, herons, owls, badgers, ferrets, foxes, porcupines, and weasels.

== See also ==
- List of botanical gardens in Italy
