= Trauttmansdorff Castle =

Castle near Merano, South Tyrol, Italy

Coordinates: 46°39′39″N 11°11′07″E

Trauttmansdorff Castle is located in northern Italy and has been owned by the Trauttmansdorff family for roughly 500 years. The castle and gardens are of many different architectural styles as construction happened prior to the 1300s, in the 1500s and the 1800s. The castle is currently serving as a tourist location and home to a tourism museum.

== Castle location ==
Trauttmansdorff Castle is a castle located south of the city of Merano, South Tyrol, northern Italy. To the east the castle is protected by dense forest and steep terrain. To the north, south, and west the castle is fortified by terrain and original fortification walls (from the original Neuburg Fortress built in the 14th century). The castle is adorned with gardens to the north and south.

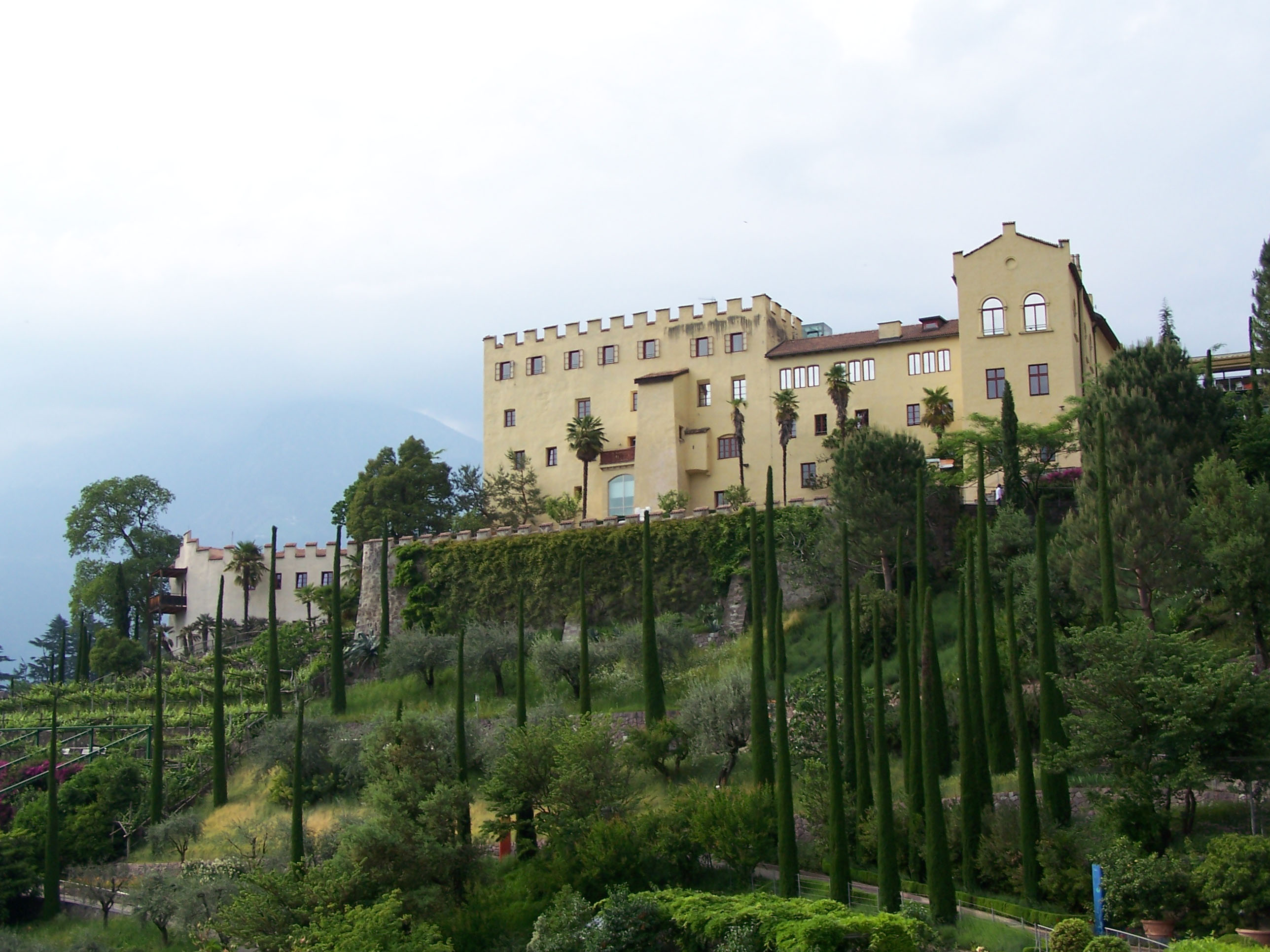
Trauttmansdorff Castle

== Castle history ==
The site of the castle was previously home to the Neuburg Fortress (built prior to the 1300s). The property was bought in the early 1500s by Nikolaus von Trauttmansdorff. Additionally, since 1543, the castle and gardens were owned by the Trauttmansdorff family, one of the oldest and most distinguished Austrian noble families. The castle was abandoned in the early 1700s by the family and was later bought back (in a state of near-disrepair "half-ruined") and renovated to its current state in 1846 by Count Josef von Trauttmansdorff. During the years of fascist Italy the castle was called di Nova Castle (Torrente Nova is the name of a little brook near Trauttmansdorff).

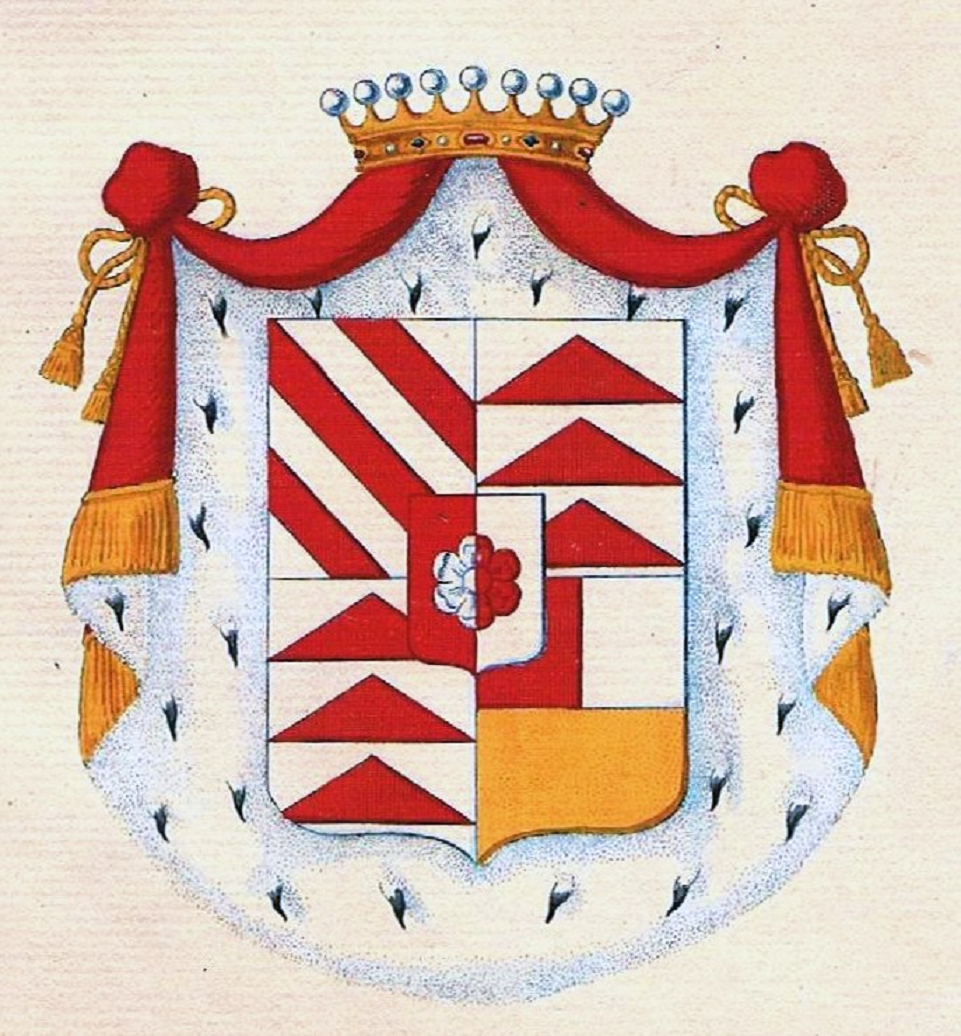
Arms of the Counts of Trauttmansdorff

== Castle architecture ==
When the castle was rebuilt in 1846, Count Josef von Trauttmansdorff opted to enlarge the building. However, due to the combination of new and old buildings on the side there is a mix of mostly three periods, first Gothic, secondly Romanesque, and finally Baroque. A key feature of Romanesque architecture is the repetition of design/building elements; this can be seen in the repetition and placement of windows seen on the facade of the castle. Secondly, the variety of windows along with the contrast of roofs and overlooks/fortifications in place of roofs align with Romanesque architecture as variety and contrast is a typical factor in Romanesque architecture. The interior hall in the castle is decorated with a Baroque ceiling mural surrounded by layers of molding and marble pilasters. Other rooms within the castle (such as the imperial rooms) have Romanesque/Gothic interior windows, this is shown by the mix of rounded and pointed arch shaped windows.

== Current affairs at the castle ==
The castle and grounds are now a tourism site and home to the "Touriseum", a museum of tourism. Additionally, since 2001 the surrounding grounds have been open as the Trauttmansdorff Castle Gardens, a botanical garden.
