= Trauttmansdorff Castle Gardens =

Botanical garden in Italy

Gardens of Trauttmansdorff Castle
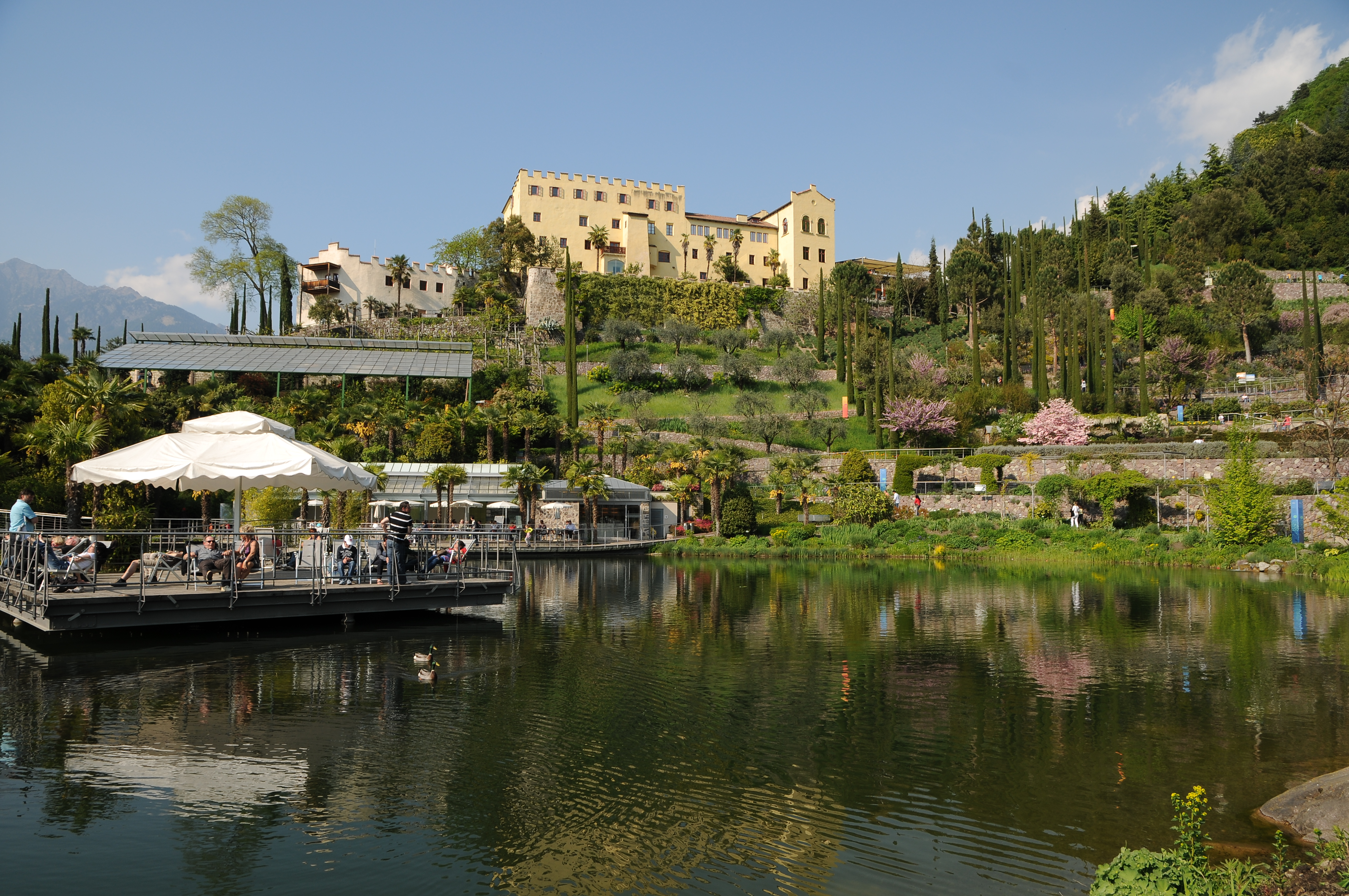
- Botanical gardens with view of Trauttmansdorff Castle
- Interactive map of Gardens of Trauttmansdorff Castle
- Type: Botanic gardens
- Location: Meran, Italy
- Coordinates: 46°39′36″N 11°11′06″E
- Area: 12 ha (30 acres)
- Created: c. 1850
- Status: Open in summer

The Gardens of Trauttmansdorff Castle (German: Die Gärten von Schloss Trauttmansdorff; Italian: I Giardini di Castel Trauttmansdorff) are botanical gardens located on the grounds of Trauttmansdorff Castle in Meran, Italy. The gardens are open daily in the warmer months; an admission fee is charged.

== History ==
The gardens were initially laid out circa 1850 by Count Joseph von Trauttmansdorff (1788-1870) during the castle's restoration. Empress Elisabeth of Austria was a frequent visitor to Meran and the gardens. A bronze bust in her memory was placed in the gardens after her assassination in Geneva in 1898.

After being used for other purposes the original gardens disappeared. Between 1994 and 2001, a completely new garden was planted around the castle. In 2001 the new Trauttmansdorff botanical gardens were opened to public.

== Gardens ==
Today, the castle grounds contain about 80 dedicated gardens with local and exotic plants, organized by region of origin, including typical landscapes of South Tyrol. Principal features of interest include:

- Forests of the world – conifers and deciduous trees from the Americas and Asia.
- Oleander Steps – flowering oleander, an ancient olive tree, etc.
- Sun Gardens – cultivated plants of the Mediterranean, including cypress, figs, grapevines, lavender, and Italy's northernmost olive grove.
- Water and Terraced Gardens – various gardens, including a formal Italian garden, English garden, and sensual garden.
- The landscapes of South Tyrol – testimony of the ancient vegetation of the Valle dell'Adige.

The gardens also contain Aesculapian Snakes in their natural habitat, courtesy of the Alpine Zoo of Innsbruck, an aviary, a Japanese alluvial forest, rice terraces, and tea plantations.

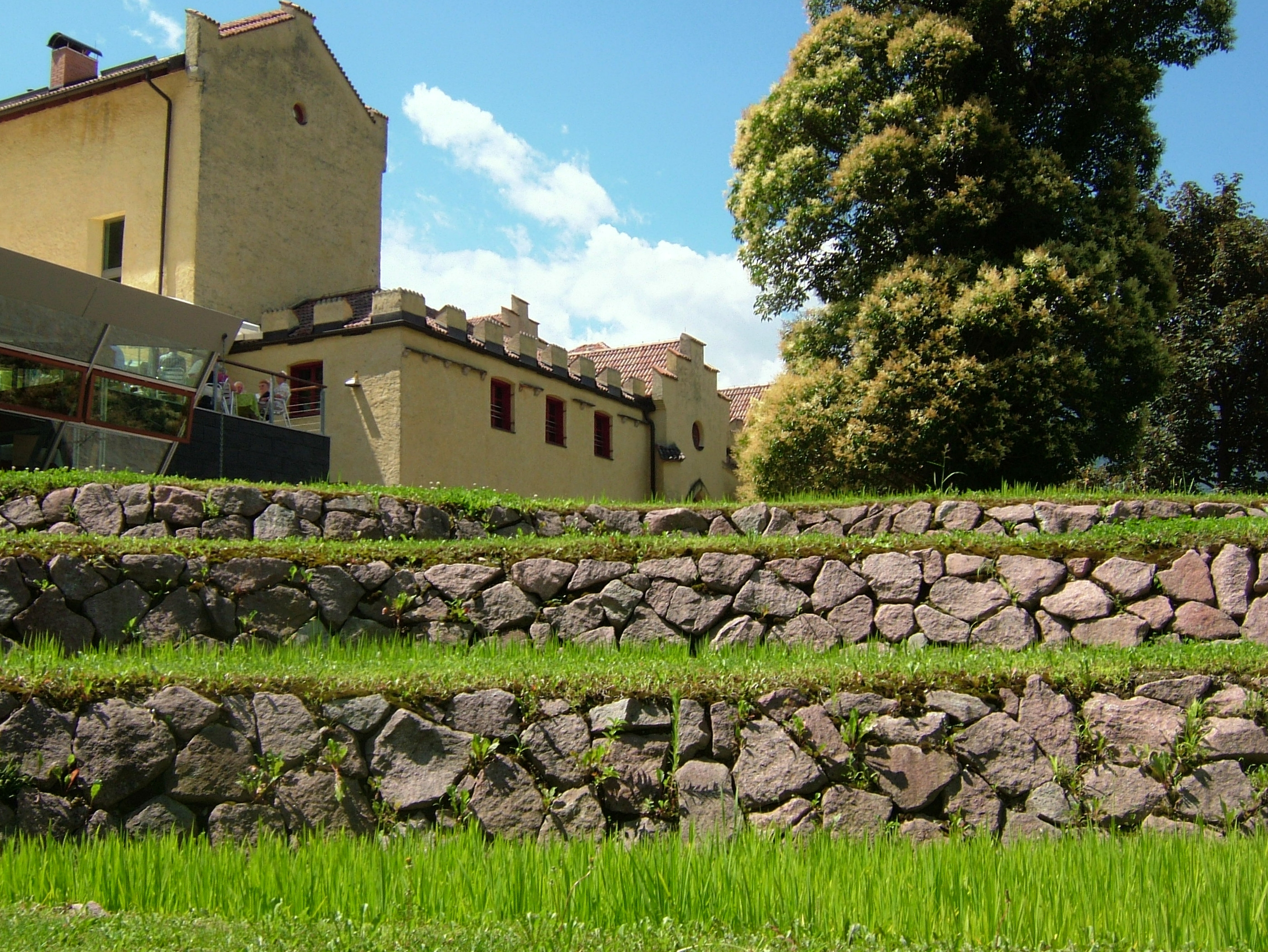
Rice terraces in the Sun Gardens

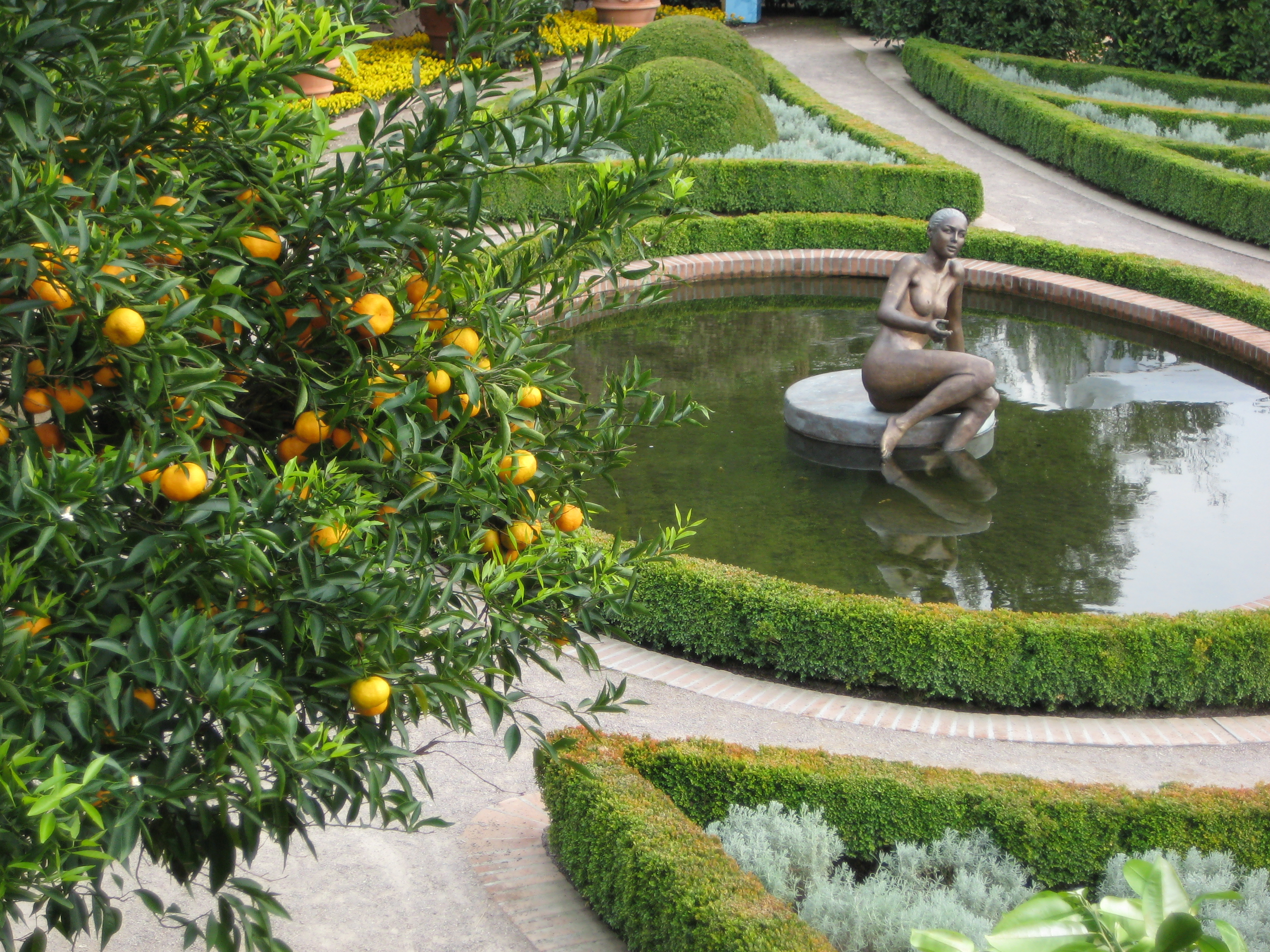
View of the fountain

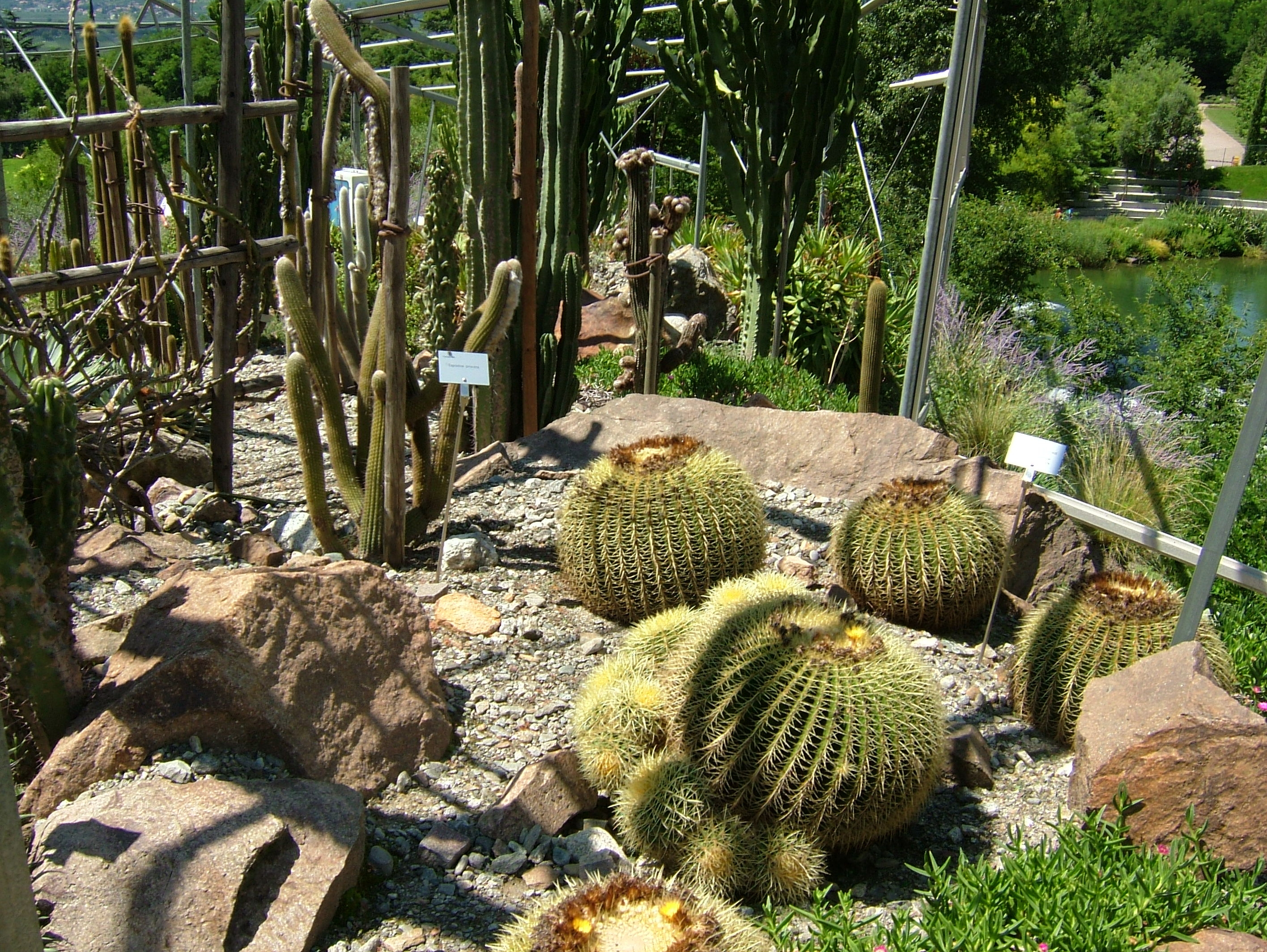
A collection of succulent plants in the Water and Terraced Gardens

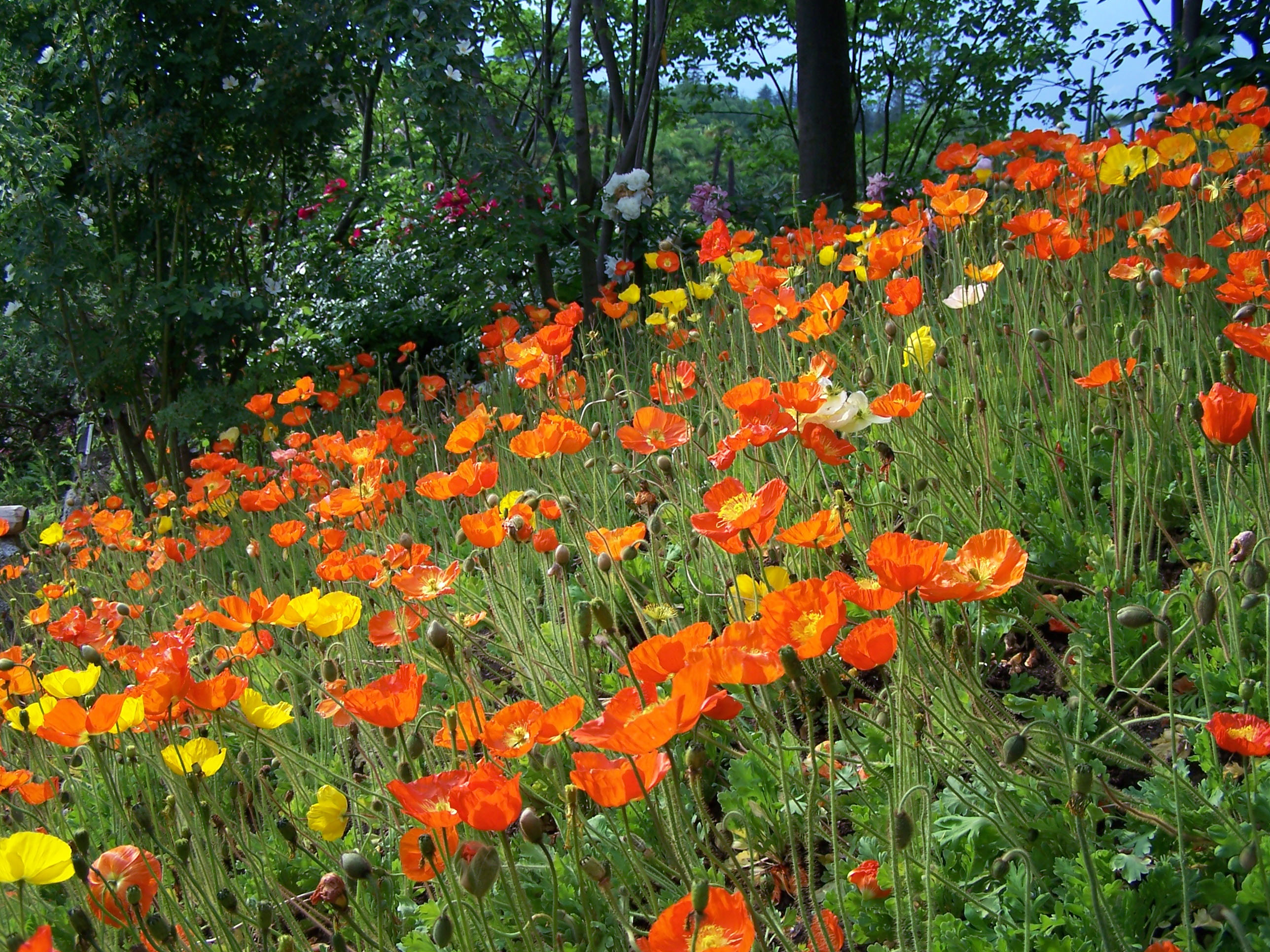
Iceland poppy (Papaver nudicaule) field

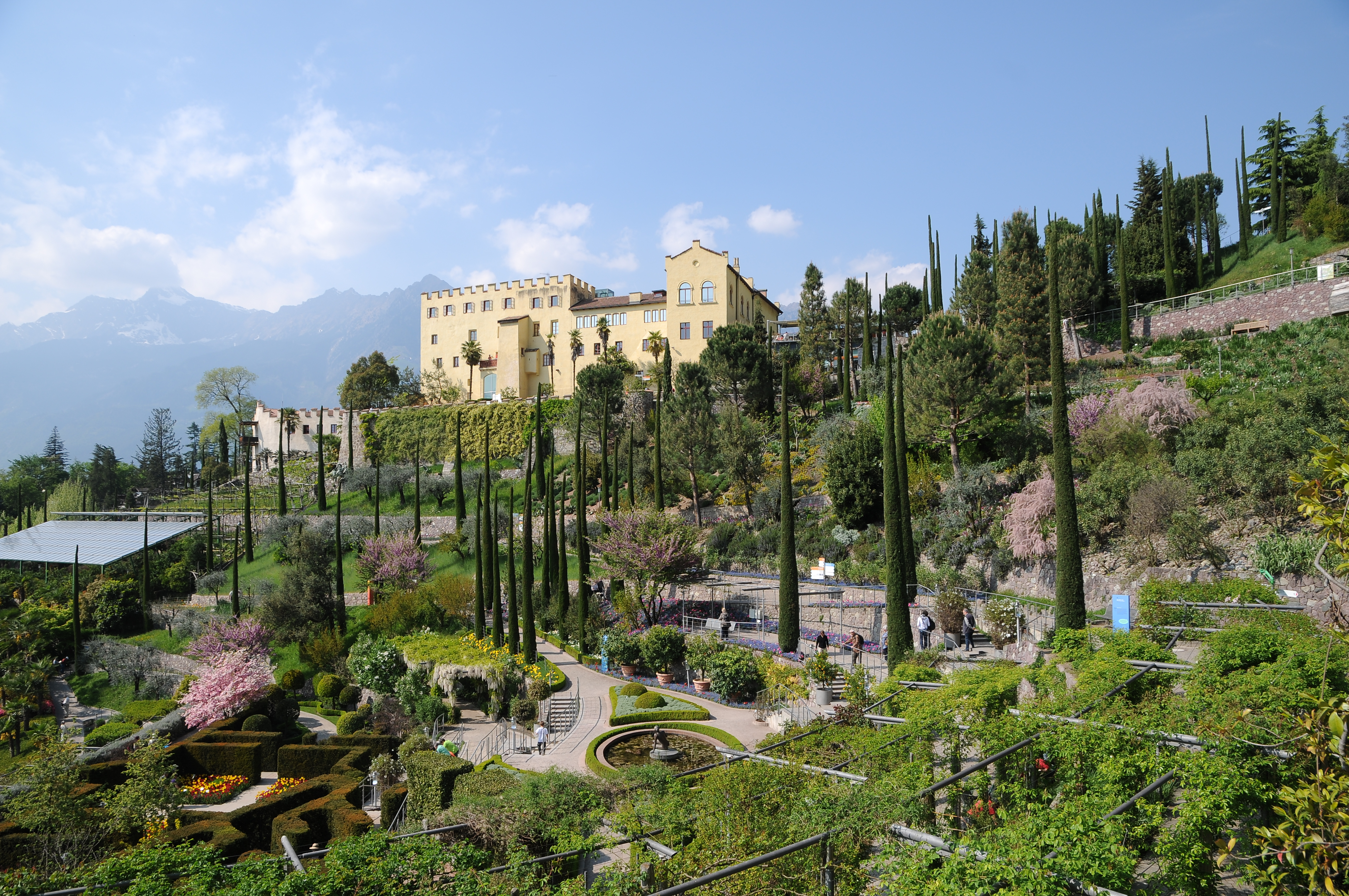
View of the gardens

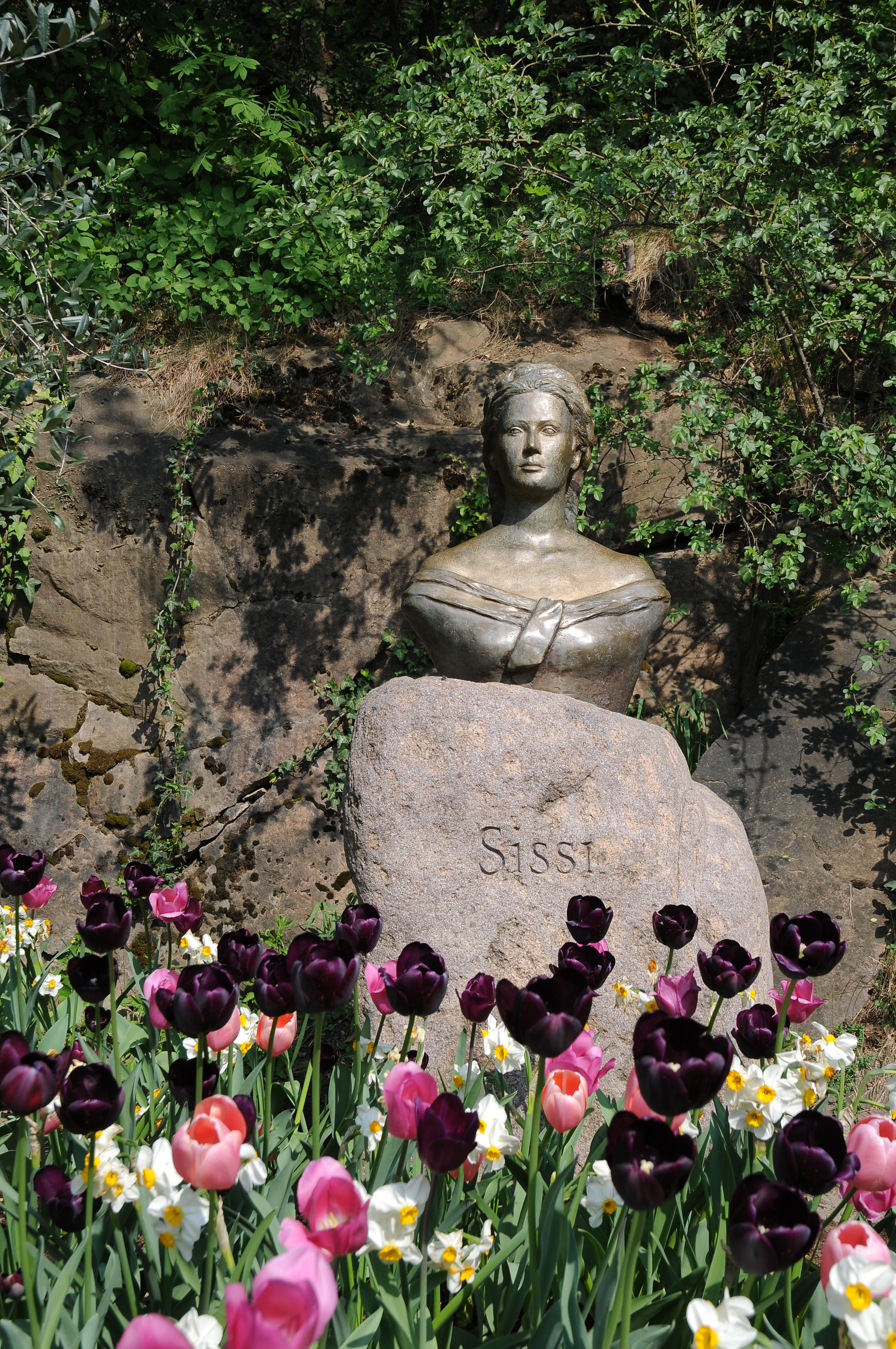
Bronze bust of Empress Elisabeth, who was a frequent visitor

== See also ==
- Grandi Giardini Italiani
- List of botanical gardens in Italy
