= Bardini Gardens =

Italian Renaissance garden in Oltrarno, Florence, Italy

Coordinates: 43°45′49.49″N 11°15′26.49″E

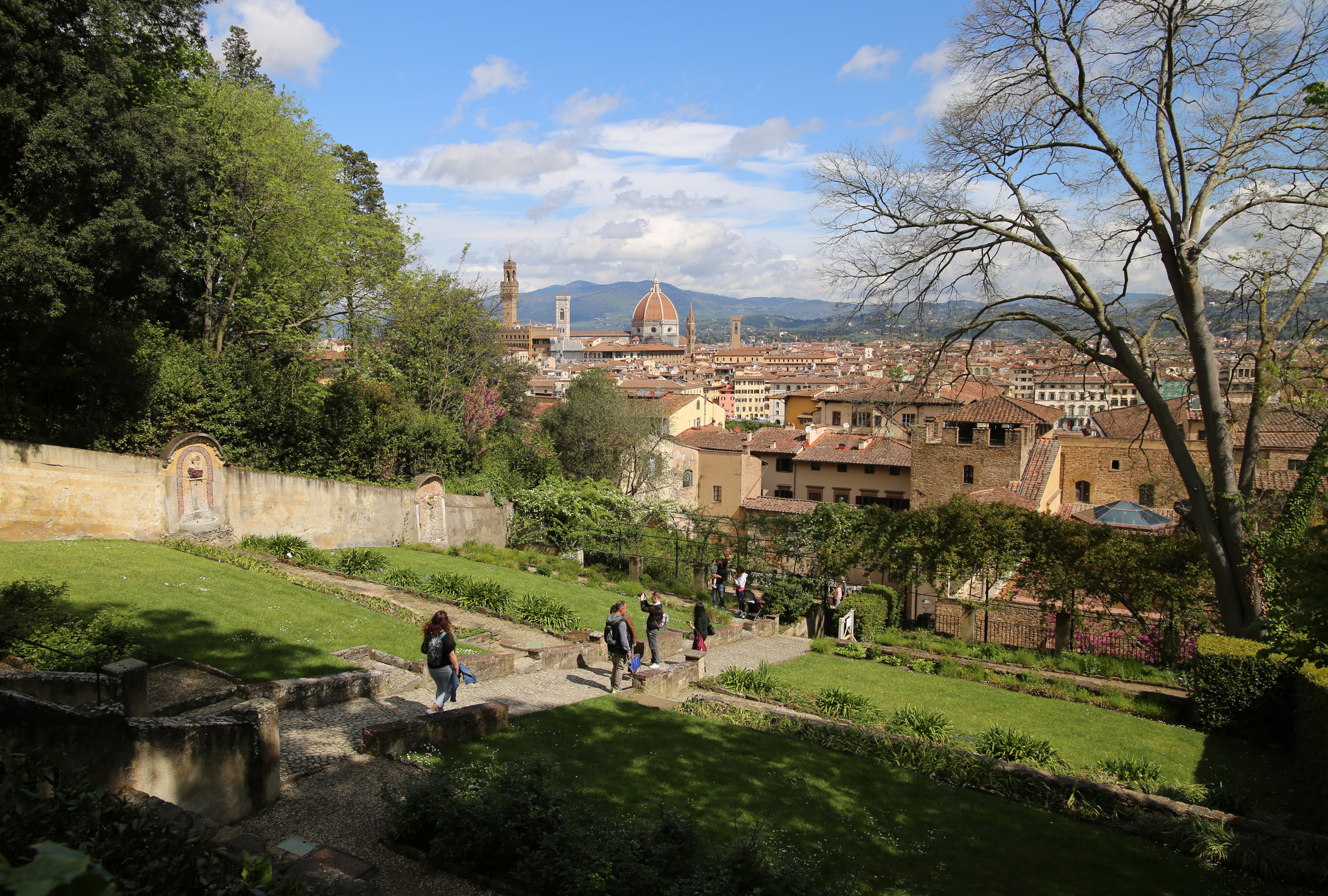
Giardino Bardini

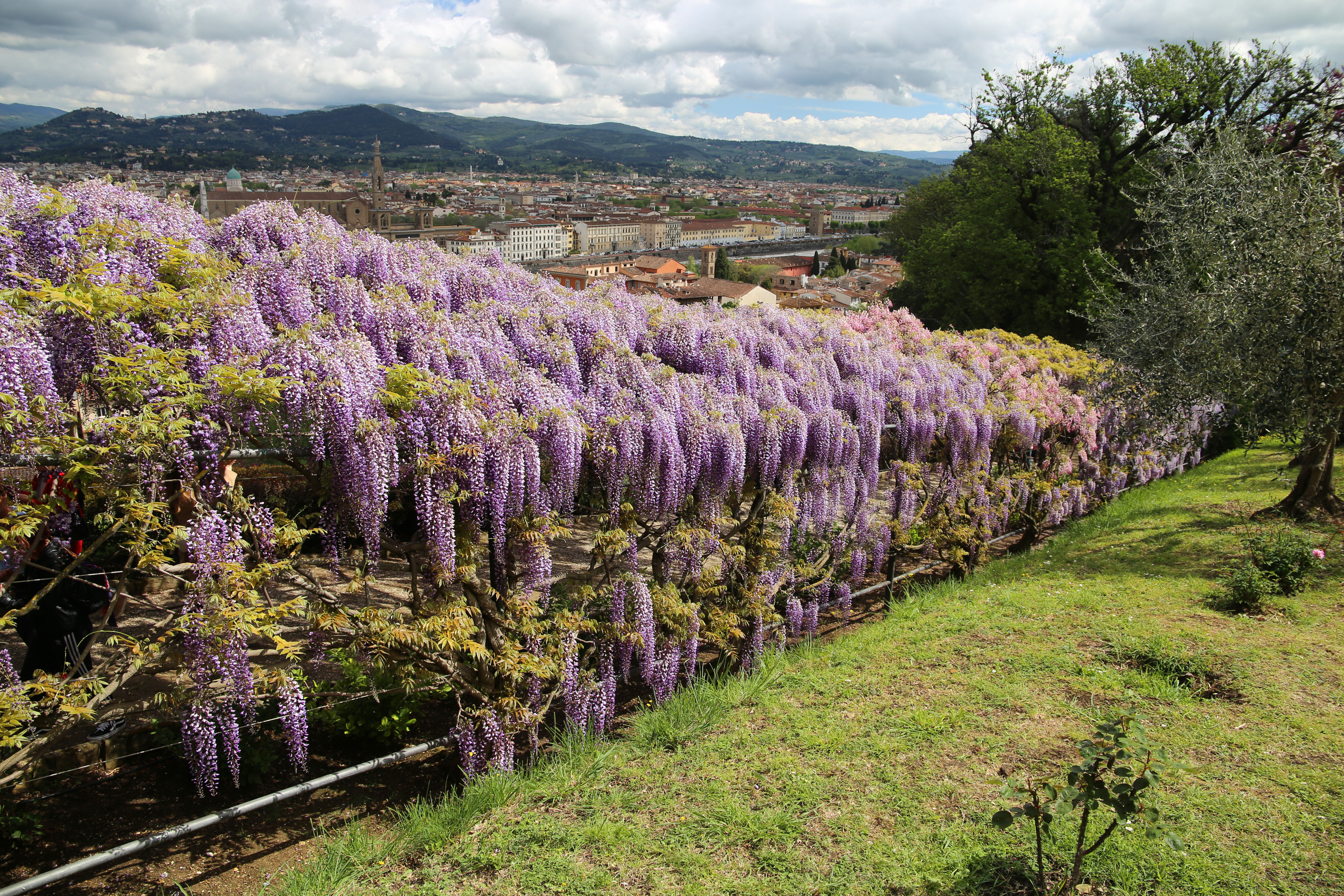
Wisteria gallery in Spring

The Giardino Bardini is an Italian Renaissance garden of the Villa Bardini in the hilly part of Oltrarno, offering views of Florence, Italy.

The garden is composed of three separate areas, each created in a different time period. The park's center contains the grand staircase that was constructed in the 17th century. On one side of the staircase is an Anglo-Chinese garden created in the 19th century. The other side of the staircase hosts the garden's agricultural park. The garden has many statues and panoramic views over the city. Wildlife in the garden includes rock pigeons, blackbirds and woodpigeons.

Access is gained via the Via de' Bardi in the Oltrarno district of the city, although the gardens exit onto the Costa di San Giorgio, onto which the Forte di Belevedere and the Giardino di Boboli connect in turn.

== See also ==
- Grandi Giardini Italiani
