= Borgo Storico Seghetti Panichi =

Coordinates: 42°52′01″N 13°43′12″E

Parco Storico Seghetti Panichi showing Ludwig Winter's design with mature palms and oriental features

The Borgo Storico Seghetti Panichi near Ascoli Piceno in Marche region of central Italy comprises a 13th to 18th-century villa, a 19th-century romantic landscape by Ludwig Winter (one of the Grandi Giardini Italiani), a 16th-century chapel to St. Pancras and a farmstead which has been converted into a hotel.

== Villa Seghetti Panichi ==
There was originally a castle on the site of the villa, probably from the late 10th century, which was fortified in 1311 when it was known as ‘Castel della Lama’, now the name of the adjoining village Castel di Lama. The castle was then a Guelph outpost in the war against the Ghibellines.

The castle was a square building with a round watch tower on one corner, part of which is still visible in the current villa. In the late 17th century war declined in the region and from 1680 to 1750 the fort was transformed into a grand residence with an austere counter-reformation exterior.

== Gardens (Parco Storico Seghetti Panichi) ==
In 1875, the owner of the villa commissioned Ludwig Winter, the German botanist and landscape architect who had just finished working on the Giardini Botanici Hanbury, to create a garden around the imposing villa. Winter found that the Tronto valley had a gentle microclimate similar to the Ligurian gulf and introduced his signature exotic palm trees that he had pioneered in Liguria. He complemented the soft hillside and views of the Adriatic Sea and Sibillini Mountains with a lake and winding gardens, now listed in the Grandi Giardini Italiani. As well as the palms, these include a miniature oriental landscape featuring Styphnolobium japonicum "Pendulum" and "Prunus", and a large Cycas revoluta. Examples of large mature palms in the Parco Storico Seghetti Panichi include:

- Jubaea chilensis
- Phoenix canariensis
- Chamaerops humilis
- Washingtonia filifera
- Trachycarpus fortunei
- Brahea dulcis

== Chapel ==
The chapel was built in 1608 and dedicated to St Pancras. It is decorated with frescoes of local saints St Emygdius and St Seraphin of Montegranaro (died 1604) from the Biagio Miniera school. Unusually, the 16th-century travertine altar faces west instead of east.

== Visiting ==
The garden is open to the public during exhibitions and by special arrangement and to hotel guests.

== See also ==
- Grandi Giardini Italiani
- Ludwig Winter
- Ascoli Piceno
- Giardini Botanici Hanbury
