= Parco Giardino Sigurtà =

Historic garden in Valeggio sul Mincio, Italy

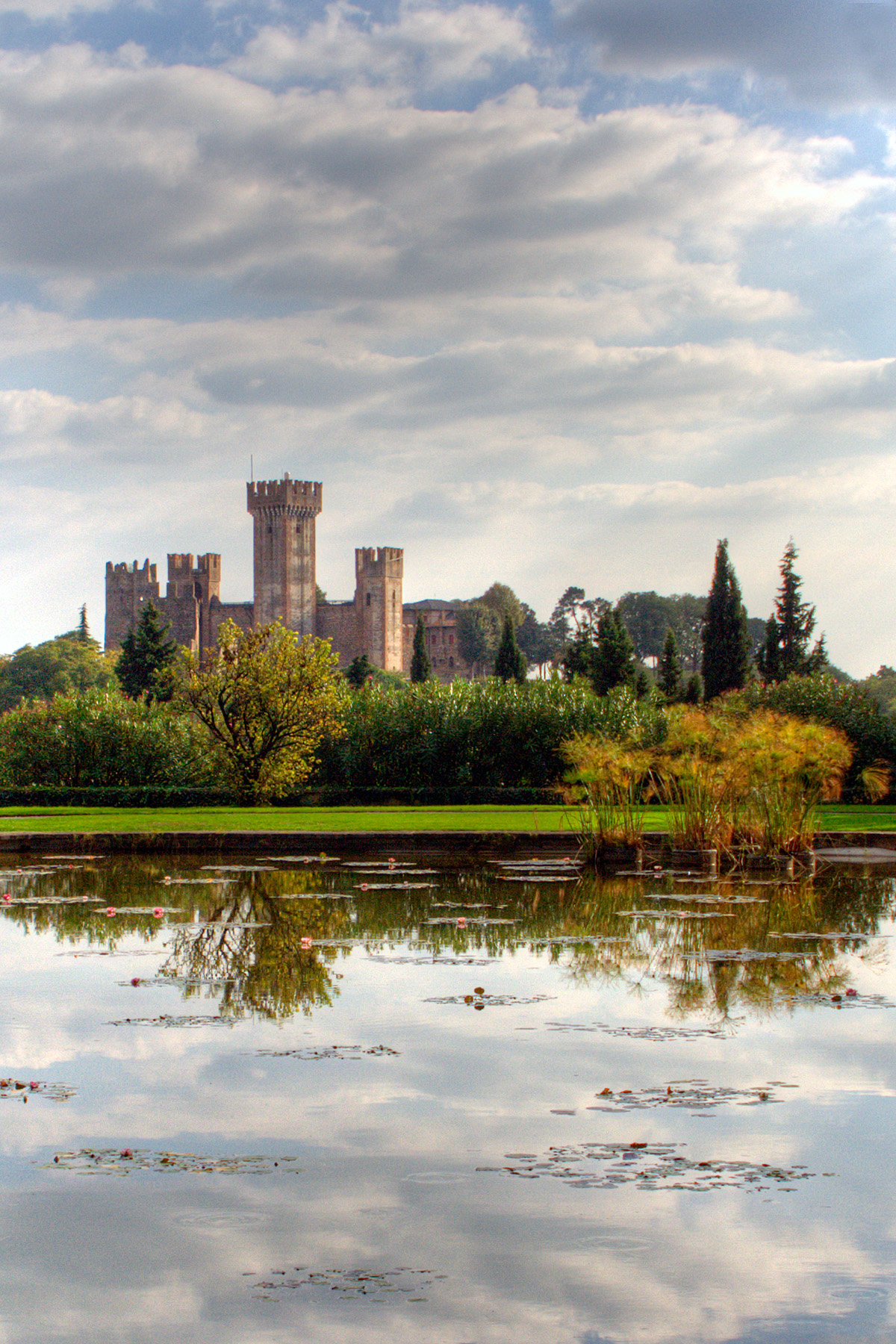
- Interactive map of Parco Giardino Sigurtà
- Location: Italy
- Nearest city: Valeggio sul Mincio
- Coordinates: 45°21′36″N 10°43′54″E
- Area: 60 hectars
- Created: March 19, 1978
- Open: March to October
- Status: Open
- Website: www.sigurta.it

Parco Giardino Sigurtà is a naturalistic garden covering 600,000 square metres and located on two gentle moraine hills in Valeggio sul Mincio, province of Verona, approximately 8 km from Peschiera del Garda. It has received several international awards, including Most Beautiful Park in Italy (2013), Second Most Beautiful Park in Europe (2015), and the Garden Tourism Award as one of the world's notable gardens (2023).

== Location ==
The park is located north of the town of Valeggio sul Mincio (Verona). It lies approximately 9 kilometres from the southern shore of Lake Garda, near Peschiera del Garda. Covering 60 hectares, the park extends across gently rolling hills along the left bank of the Mincio River and is situated about 50 metres above the water level. The park measures roughly 1.3 kilometres in length, with an average width of 450 metres. The historic residence (Villa Sigurtà) at the southern end is no longer part of the current property.

== History ==
The origins of the park date back to 1417, when the area was established as a brolo cinto de muro, a walled rural estate common in the Venetian territories. Over the centuries it belonged to the Contarini, Guarienti and Maffei families before passing to the Sigurtà family, who initiated its modern development.

In 1941, pharmaceutical industrialist Giuseppe Carlo Sigurtà purchased the estate, then in a state of neglect, and restored it thanks to the historic right to draw water from the nearby Mincio River. Under his direction, and later that of his adopted son Enzo Inga Sigurtà, the property was transformed into a flourishing garden.

The park opened to the public on 19 March 1978. Initially, visits took place by car in a system known as auto-guide, but since the early 2000s the park has been accessible exclusively on foot. Today, Parco Giardino Sigurtà is open from March to November and welcomes more than 400,000 visitors annually.

Throughout its history, the property has hosted many notable guests from the worlds of royalty, the arts and science, including Maria Callas, Rosanna Carteri, Giulietta Simionato, Queen Victoria Eugenie of Spain, King Constantine of Greece, Simeon II of Bulgaria, Charles III of the United Kingdom, Prince Philippe of Belgium, members of the princely families of Liechtenstein and Luxembourg, as well as Nobel laureates Konrad Lorenz, Alexander Fleming, Selman Waksman and Albert Sabin.

In the 2000s, the park saw further development, including the creation of the Labyrinth, designed in collaboration with maze designer Adrian Fisher. The third generation of the Sigurtà family now manages the estate.

== Naturalistic and historical features ==
Parco Giardino Sigurtà contains a wide variety of landscapes, architectural elements and botanical collections of historical interest.

=== Viale delle Rose ===
One of the park's most representative features is the Viale delle Rose, a one-kilometre avenue that from May to September hosts tens of thousands of remontant roses and offers a panoramic view of the Scaligero Castle of Valeggio sul Mincio.

=== Labyrinth ===
The Labyrinth, inaugurated in 2011, consists of 1,500 yew trees arranged in an intricate geometric pattern with a central tower inspired by that of the Bois de Boulogne in Paris. Covering 2,500 square metres, it was designed by Giuseppe Inga Sigurtà with Adrian Fisher. In 2025, the term polirinto was introduced to distinguish multi-exit mazes from single-path labyrinths.

=== Water gardens and lawns ===
The park includes 18 ponds populated with aquatic species such as hardy and tropical water lilies, water hyacinths and lotus flowers, with peak flowering in June and July. Large expanses of lawn and shaded areas create a landscape suited to walking and contemplation.

=== Architectural elements ===
Other points of interest include:

- the Castelletto, housing historical and scientific materials related to the Sigurtà family
- the Neo-Gothic Hermitage
- the Great Oak, an over 400-year-old specimen
- the historic Pet Cemetery
- a horizontal sundial inspired by Galileo Galilei
- the so-called Stone of Youth

=== Farm area ===
In the agricultural sector of the park, a small farm hosts donkeys, sheep, goats, hens, turkeys and ducks. It is open throughout the season and frequently visited by families and school groups. Informational panels describe the animals and include educational content on plant intelligence.

== Botanical collections and flowering seasons ==
The park features flowering displays throughout its opening season.

- Spring: tulips, hyacinths, daffodils, irises, peonies and the first roses
- Summer: sunflowers, dahlias and aquatic species including hardy and tropical water lilies
- Autumn: asters, begonias, zinnias, canna indica and other seasonal blooms

A distinguishing feature of the park is its extensive lawns and centuries-old broadleaf woodlands, primarily composed of hornbeams, oaks, boxwood, dawn redwoods and Celtis australis.

== Tulipanomania ==
Tulipanomania is the park's renowned tulip festival, considered the second largest in Europe after Keukenhof and the largest in Italy. Each year, special installations such as floating flowerbeds, floral terraces and large-scale tulip designs are created.

Over time, Tulipanomania has grown from 5,000 tulips to more than one million specimens, accompanied by hyacinths, daffodils and muscari. The event attracts around 100,000 visitors in March and April and has received several awards, including:

- Most Beautiful Bloom in Italy (2016)
- Most Beautiful Bloom in the World (2019)
- Best Tulip Festival (2022)
- World Tulip Innovation Award (2024)

== Visitor services ==
The park is generally open from March to November (with hours varying by season). It can be visited on foot, by bicycle, by golf-cart rental, electric shuttle or panoramic train. Facilities include picnic areas, family-friendly routes, bicycle and golf-cart rental, and a themed educational app for children.

== Events ==
Parco Giardino Sigurtà hosts a wide calendar of events for all ages. Activities range from non-competitive runs to major cosplay gatherings, historical reenactments, children's days and cultural initiatives involving music and the arts. These events enhance the visitor experience and contribute to the park's role as a cultural and recreational destination.

== Awards ==
A selection of awards received includes:

- 2013 – Most Beautiful Park in Italy
- 2015 – Second Most Beautiful Park in Europe (EGHN)
- 2016 – Most Beautiful Bloom in Italy (Tulipanomania)
- 2017 – Ecological Gardening Award
- 2019 – World Tulip Award
- 2020 – Tiqets Best Attraction in Italy
- 2022 – Best Tulip Festival
- 2023 – Garden Tourism Award (International Garden Tourism Awards)
- 2024 – World Tulip Innovation Award

== Mascot ==
The park's mascot is Tà, a squirrel inspired by the European red squirrel. It appears in a free educational app that guides children through a treasure-hunt-style exploration of the park.
