= Giardini Botanici Villa Taranto =

Botanical gardens in Verbano-Cusio-Ossola, Italy

Coordinates: 45°55′30″N 8°33′36″E

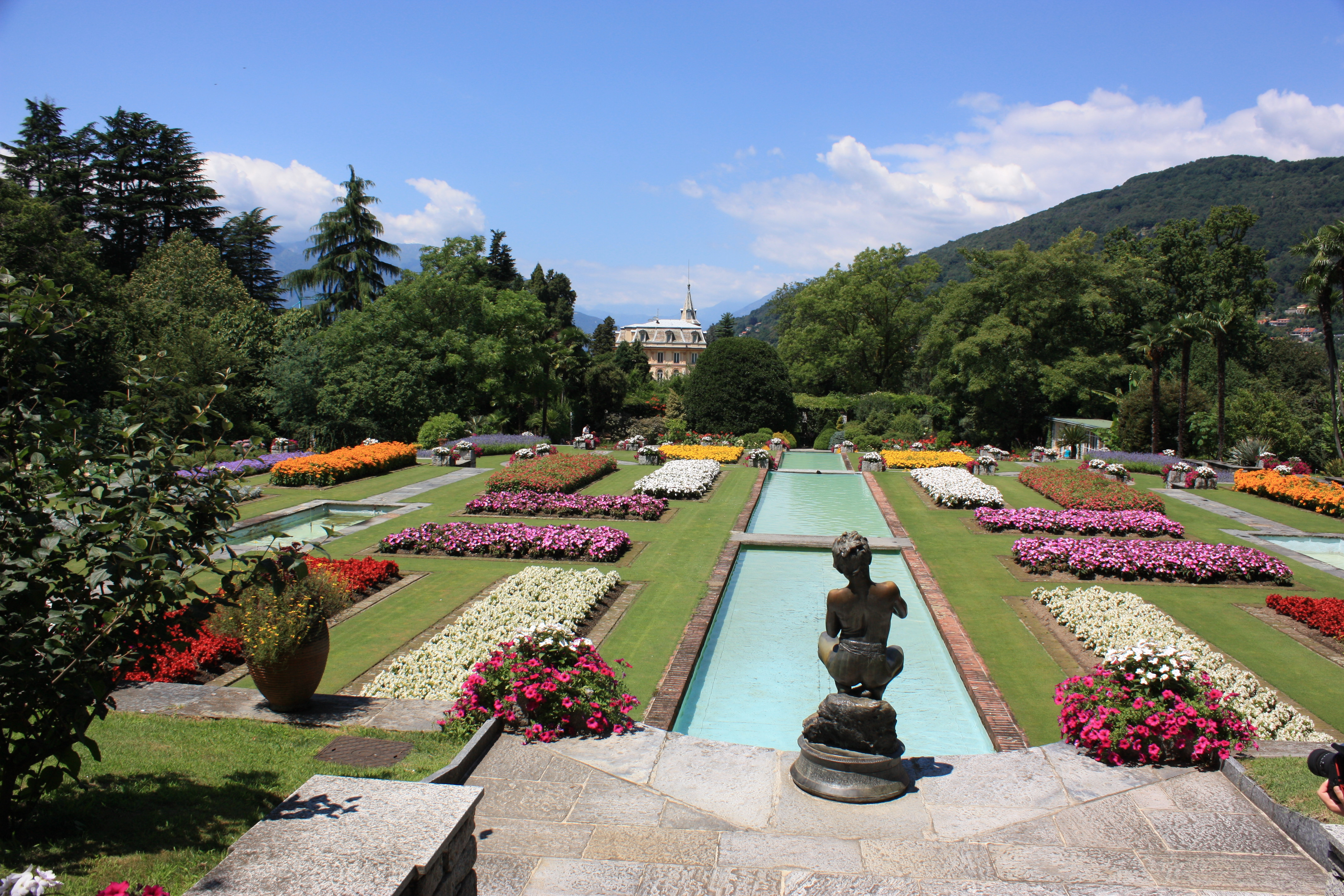
Giardini Botanici Villa Taranto

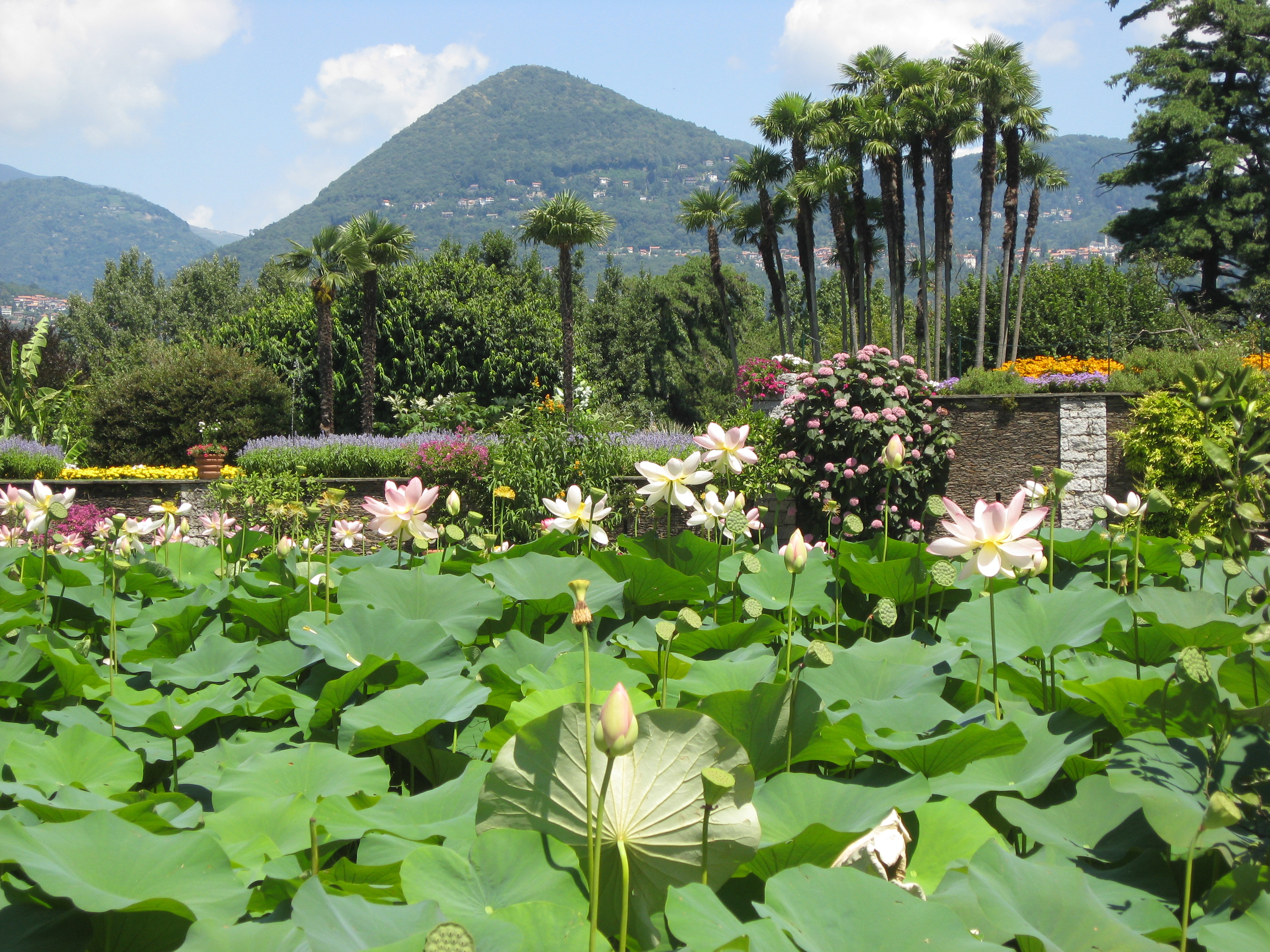
Lotus garden Giardini Botanici Villa Taranto

The Giardini Botanici Villa Taranto (16 hectares) are botanical gardens located on the western shore of Lake Maggiore in Pallanza, Province of Verbano-Cusio-Ossola, Italy. They are open daily; an admission fee is charged.

The gardens were established 1931–1940 by Scotsman Neil Boyd McEacharn who bought an existing villa and its neighbouring estates, cut down more than 2000 trees, and undertook substantial changes to the landscape, including the addition of major water features employing 8 km of pipes. He set the name "Villa Taranto" (Taranto House) in honour of his ancestor Étienne Jacques Joseph Alexandre MacDonald, named Duke of Taranto by Napoleon. They opened to the public in 1952, and after McEacharn's death in 1964 have been run by a non-profit organization. The Villa Taranto itself is not open to the public; it is used by the government.

Captain Neil Boyd Watson McEacharn was born in 1884 in Hanover Square, London, England. His father was the Australian Sir Malcolm Donald McEacharn of Scottish descent and his mother Mary Ann Watson, a daughter of Australian mining millionaire John Boyd Watson. He was commissioned into the Kings Own Scottish Borderers of the British Army in 1911 and served throughout the First World War, being appointed a Member of the Most Excellent Order of the British Empire (MBE).

Today the gardens contain nearly 20,000 plant varieties, representing more than 3,000 species, set among 7 km of paths. Among its collections are azalea, cornus, greenhouses of Victoria amazonica, and 300 types of dahlias. It also contains a small herbarium and the founder's mausoleum.

== See also ==
- List of botanical gardens in Italy
