= Italian Renaissance garden =

15th-century garden style

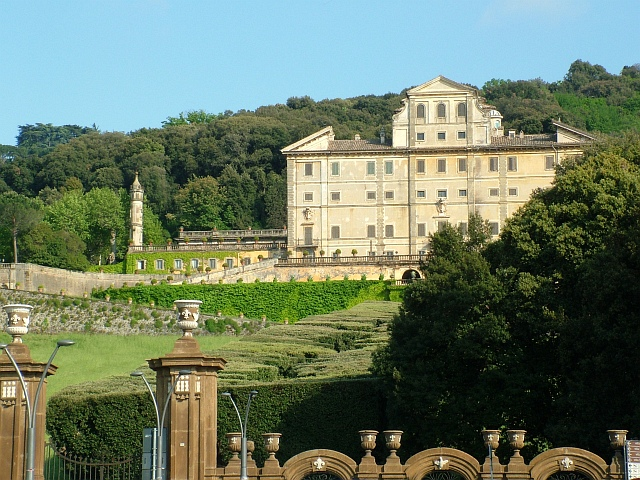
Gardens of the Villa Aldobrandini (1598)

The Italian Renaissance garden was a new style of garden which emerged in the late 15th century at villas in Rome and Florence, inspired by classical ideals of order and beauty, and intended for the pleasure of the view of the garden and the landscape beyond, for contemplation, and for the enjoyment of the sights, sounds and smells of the garden itself.

In the late Italian Renaissance, the gardens became larger, grander and more symmetrical, and were filled with fountains, statues, grottoes, water organs and other features designed to delight their owners and amuse and impress visitors. The style was imitated throughout Europe, influencing the gardens of the French Renaissance, the English knot garden, and the French formal garden style developed in the 17th century.

== Background ==
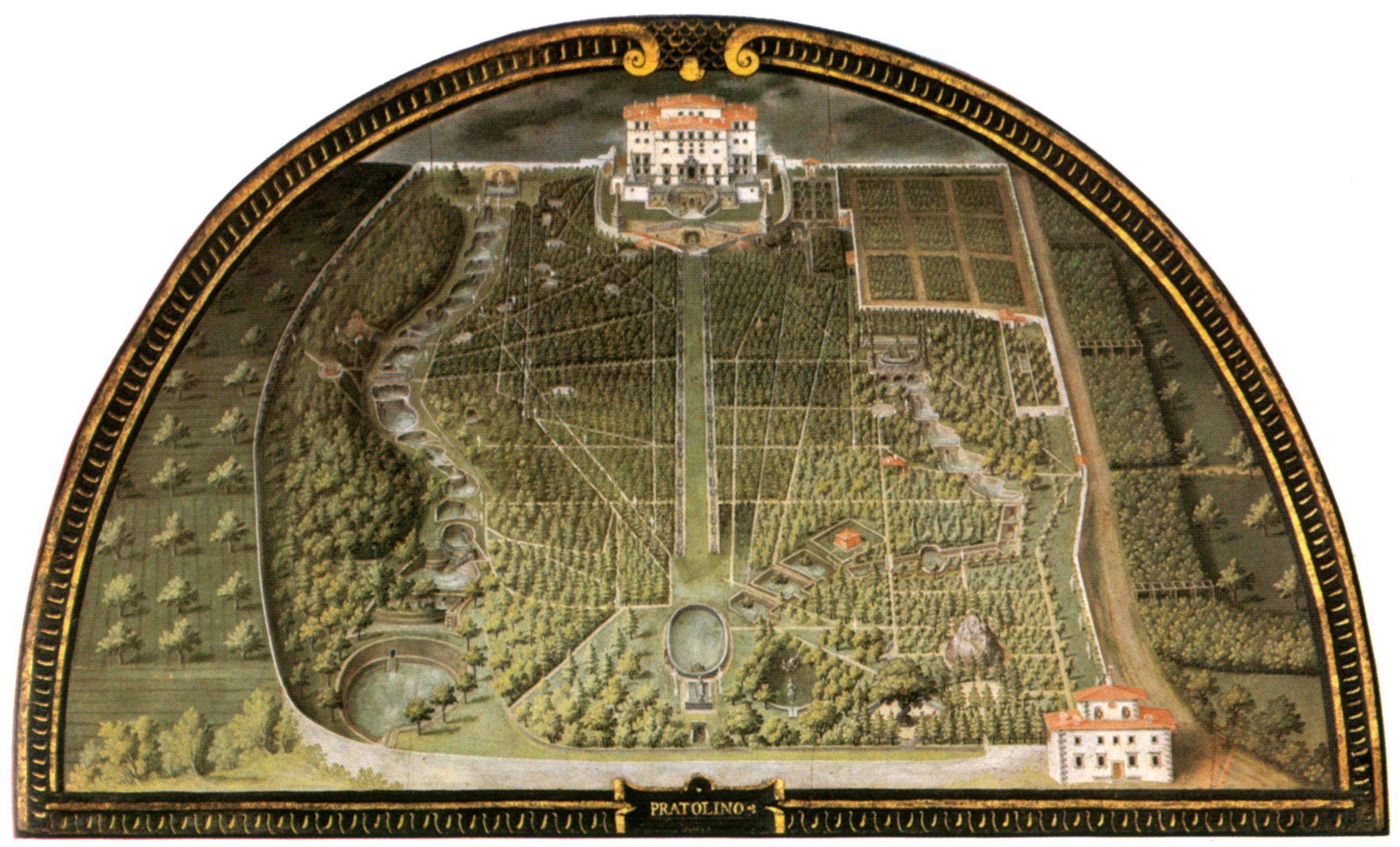
Lunette painted by Giusto Utens (1598) of the Medici garden at Villa Pratolino

Prior to the Italian Renaissance, Italian medieval gardens were enclosed by walls, and were mostly devoted to growing vegetables, fruits and medicinal herbs, as well as, in the case of monastic gardens, for silent meditation and prayer. The Italian Renaissance garden broke down the wall between the garden, the house, and the landscape outside.

Beginning in the early modern period translations of Classical works began to circulate among European society, and by the mid-16th century showed influences of Francesco di Giorgio Martini and Sebastiano Serlio, being regarded more like works of art themselves.

The Italian Renaissance garden, like Renaissance art and architecture, emerged from the rediscovery by Renaissance scholars of classical Roman models. They were inspired by the descriptions of ancient Roman gardens given by Ovid in his Metamorphoses, by the letters of Pliny the Younger, by Pliny the Elder's Naturalis Historia, and in Rerum Rusticanum by Varro, all of which gave detailed and lyrical description of the gardens of Roman villas.

Pliny the Younger described his life at his villa at Laurentum: "a good life and a genuine one, which is happy and honourable, more rewarding than any 'business' can be. You should take the first opportunity to leave the din, the futile bustle and useless occupations of the city and devote yourself to literature or to leisure." The purpose of a garden, according to Pliny, was otium, which could be translated as seclusion, serenity, or relaxation, which was the opposite of the idea of negotium that often classified busy urban life. A garden was a place to think, relax, and escape.

Pliny described shaded paths bordered with hedges, ornamental parterres, fountains, and trees and bushes trimmed to geometric or fantastic shapes, all features which would become part of the future Renaissance garden.

== Alberti and the principles of the Renaissance garden ==
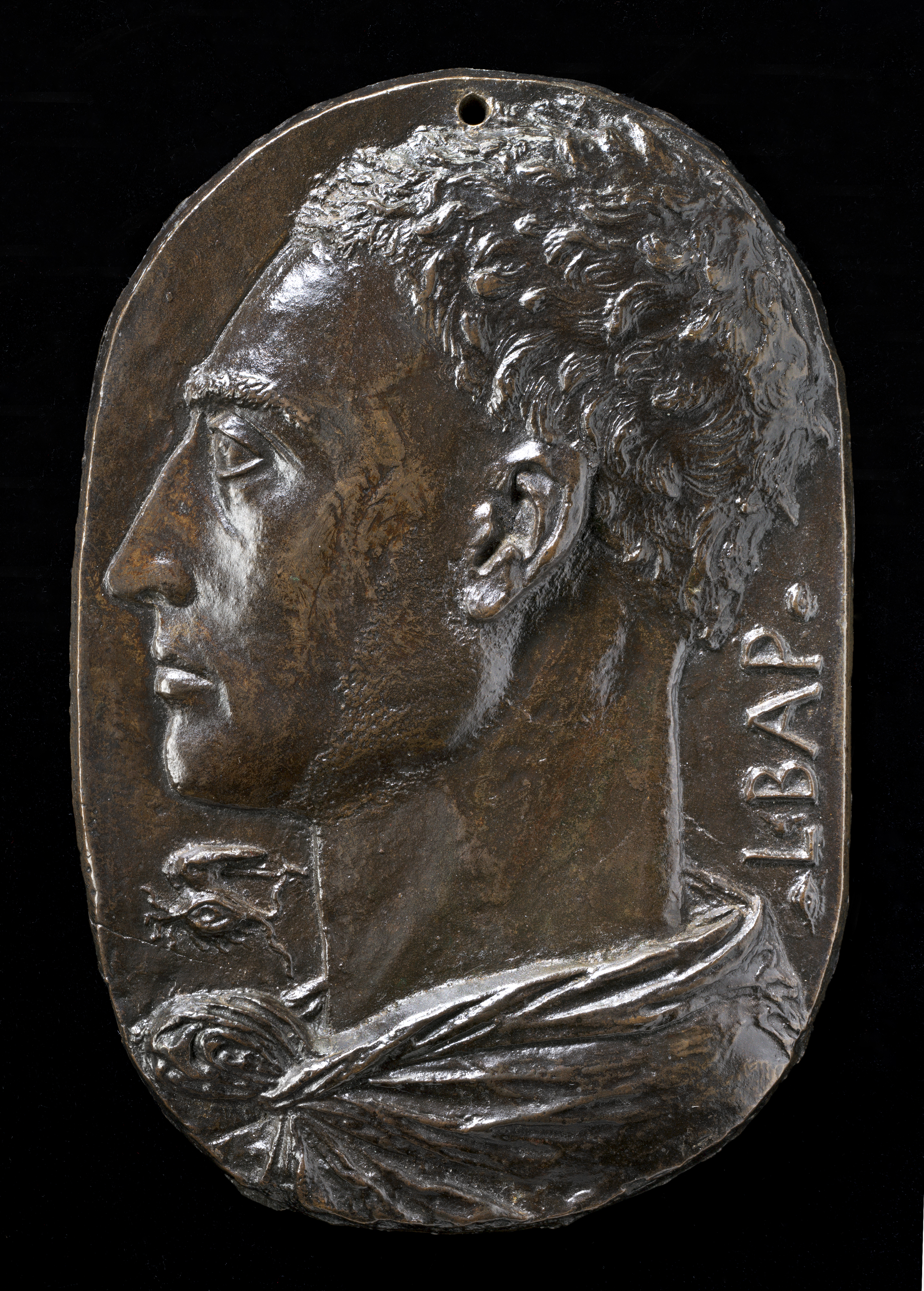
Leon Battista Alberti, self-portrait medal, c. 1435

The first Renaissance text to include garden design was De re aedificatoria (The Ten Books of Architecture), by Leon Battista Alberti (1404–1472). He drew upon the architectural principles of Vitruvius, and used quotations from Pliny the Elder and Pliny the Younger to describe what a garden should look like and how it should be used. He argued that a villa should both be looked at and a place to look from; that the house should be placed above the garden, where it could be seen and the owner could look down into the garden.

Alberti wrote: "The construction will give pleasure to the visitor if, when they leave the city, they see the villa in all its charm, as if to seduce and welcome the new arrivals. Toward this end, I would place it on a slightly elevated place. I would also have the road climb so gently that it fools those who take it to the point that they do not realize how high they have climbed until they discover the countryside below."

Within the garden, Alberti wrote: "...You should place porticos for giving shade, planters where vines can climb, placed on marble columns; vases and amusing statues, provided they are not obscene. You should also have rare plants.... Trees should be aligned and arranged evenly, each tree aligned with its neighbours."

== The literary influence on the Italian Renaissance garden ==
A popular romance, The Hypnerotomachia Poliphili, (Poliphilo's Strife of Love in a Dream), published in 1499 in Venice by the monk Francesco Colonna, also had an important influence on the gardens of the Renaissance. It described the voyage and adventures of a traveller, Poliphile, through fantastic landscapes, looking for his love, Polia. The scenes described in the book and the accompanying woodcut illustrations influenced many Renaissance gardens; they included a lake-island (as at the Boboli Gardens), giants emerging from the earth (as at Villa di Pratolino), the maze and the fountain of Venus (as at Villa di Castello), where Poliphile and Polia were reconciled.

== Power and magnificence – the political symbolism of the Renaissance garden ==
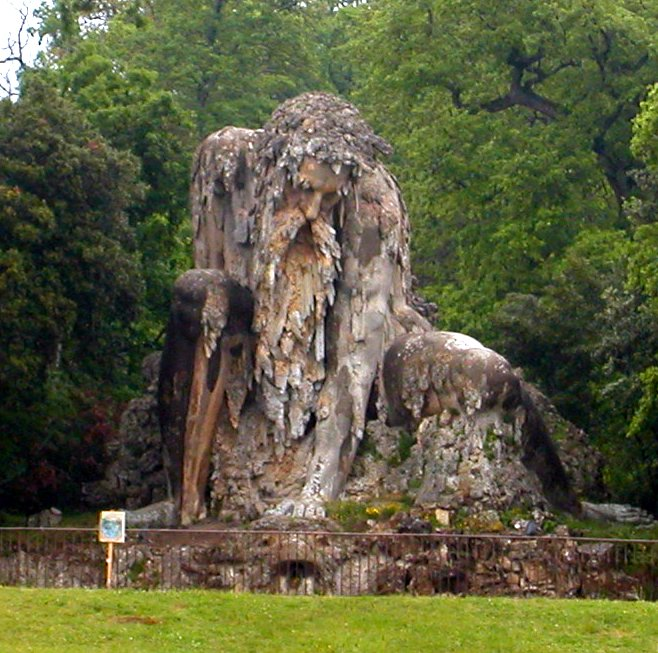
The Apennine Colossus by Giambologna in the gardens of Villa di Pratolino, about 1580

While the early Italian Renaissance gardens were designed for contemplation and pleasure with tunnels of greenery, trees for shade, an enclosed giardino segreto (secret garden) and fields for games and amusements, the Medici, the ruling dynasty of Florence, used gardens to demonstrate their own power and magnificence. "During the first half of the sixteenth century, magnificence came to be perceived as a princely virtue, and all over the Italian peninsula architects, sculptors, painters, poets, historians and humanist scholars were commissioned to concoct a magnificent image for their powerful patrons." The central fountain at Villa di Castello featured a statue of Hercules defeating Antaeus, alluding to the triumph of the garden's builder, Cosimo de' Medici, over a faction of Florentine nobles who had tried to overthrow him. The garden was a form of political theater, presenting the power, wisdom, order, beauty and glory that the Medici had brought to Florence.

== Glossary of the Italian Renaissance garden ==
- Bosco sacro: Sacred wood. A grove of trees inspired by the groves where pagans would worship. In Renaissance and especially mannerist gardens, this section was filled with allegorical statues of animals, giants and legendary creatures.
- Fontaniere: The fountain-maker, a hydraulic engineer who designed the water system and fountains.
- Giardino segreto: The Secret Garden. An enclosed private garden, or garden room, within the garden, possibly inspired by the cloisters of medieval monasteries. A place for reading, writing or quiet conversations.
- Giochi d'acqua: Water tricks. Concealed fountains which drenched unsuspecting visitors.
- Semplici: "Simples" or medicinal plants and herbs.

== Gardens of the Early Italian Renaissance ==
=== The Medici Villa at Fiesole (1455-1790) ===
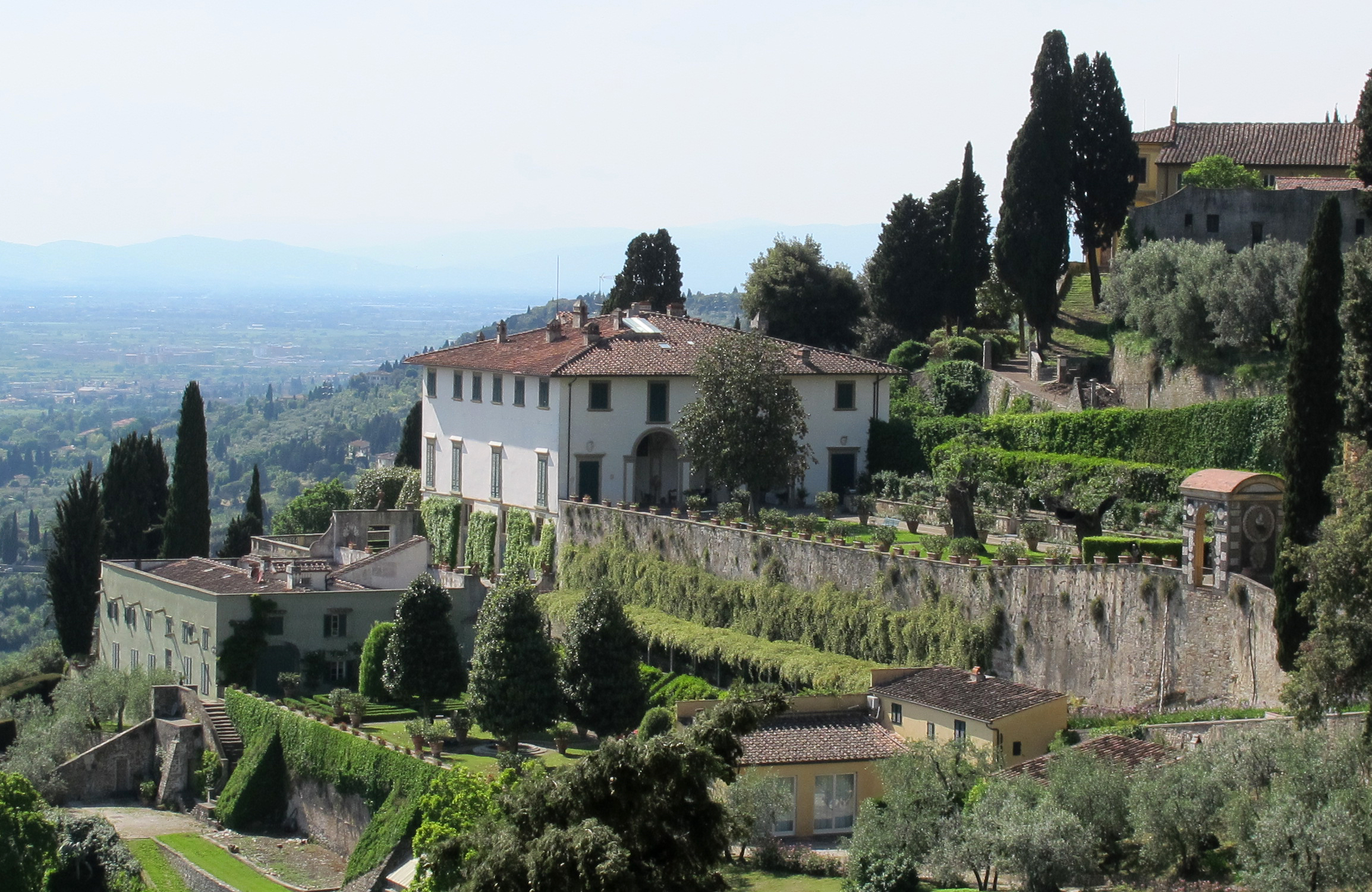
Villa Medici in Fiesole.

The oldest existing Italian Renaissance garden is at the Villa Medici in Fiesole, north of Florence. It was created sometime between 1455 and 1461 by Giovanni de' Medici (1421–1463) the son of Cosimo de' Medici, the founder of the Medici dynasty. Unlike other Medici family villas that were located on flat farmland, this villa was located on a rocky hillside with a view over Florence.

The Villa Medici followed Alberti's precepts that a villa should have a view 'that overlooks the city, the owner's land, the sea or a great plain, and familiar hills and mountains,' and that the foreground have 'the delicacy of gardens.' The garden has two large terraces, one at the ground floor level and the other at the level of the first floor. From the reception rooms on the first floor, guests could go out to the loggia and from there to the garden so the loggia was a transition space connecting the interior with the exterior. Unlike later gardens, the Villa Medici did not have a grand staircase or other feature to link the two levels.

The garden was inherited by his nephew, Lorenzo de' Medici, who made it a meeting place for poets, artists, writers and philosophers. In 1479, the poet Angelo Poliziano, tutor to the Medici children, described the garden in a letter: "..Seated between the sloping sides of the mountains we have here water in abundance and being constantly refreshed with moderate winds find little inconvenience from the glare of the sun. As you approach the house it seems embosomed in the wood, but when you reach it you find it commands a full prospect of the city."

=== The Palazzo Piccolomini at Pienza, Tuscany (1459) ===
Gardens of the Palazzo Piccolomini

The Palazzo Piccolomini at Pienza, was built by Enea Silvio Piccolomini, who was Pope from 1458 to 1464, under the name of Pius II. He was a scholar of Latin and wrote extensively on education, astronomy and social culture. In 1459, he constructed a palace for himself and his cardinals and court in his small native town of Pienza. Like the Villa Medici, a major feature of the house was the commanding view to be had from the loggia over the valley, the Val d'Orcia, to the slopes of Monte Amiata. Closer to the house, there were terraces with geometric flowerbeds surrounding fountains and ornamented with bushes trimmed into cones and spheres similar to the garden of Pliny described in Alberti's De re aedificatoria. The garden was designed to open to the town, the palace and the view.

=== The Cortile del Belvedere in the Vatican Palace, Rome (1504–1513) ===
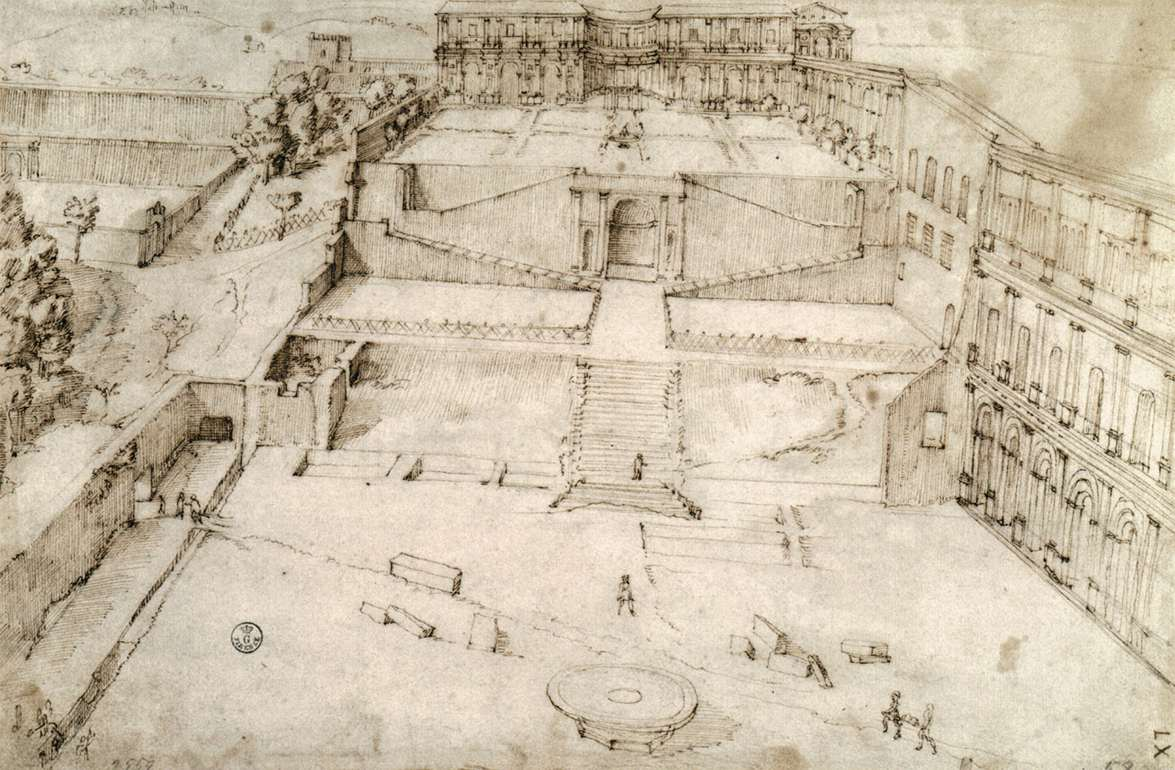
Bramante's design for the Belvedere Courtyard

In 1504 Pope Julius II commissioned the architect Donato Bramante to recreate a classical Roman pleasure garden in the space between the old papal Vatican palace in Rome and the nearby Villa Belvedere. His model was the ancient Sanctuary of Fortuna Primigenia at Palestrina or ancient Praeneste, and he used the classical ideals of proportion, symmetry and perspective in his design. He created a central axis to link the two buildings, and a series of terraces connected by double ramps, modelled after those at Palestrina. The terraces were divided into squares and rectangles by paths and flowerbeds, and served as an outdoor setting for Pope Julius's extraordinary collection of classical sculpture, which included the famous Laocoön and the Apollo Belvedere. The heart of the garden was a courtyard surrounded by a three-tiered loggia, which served as a theater for entertainments. A central exedra formed the dramatic conclusion of the long perspective up the courtyard, ramps and terraces.

The Venetian Ambassador described the Cortile del Belvedere in 1523: "One enters a very beautiful garden, of which half is filled with growing grass and bays and mulberries and cypresses, while the other half is paved with squares of bricks laid upright, and in every square a beautiful orange tree grows out of the pavement, of which there are a great many, arranged in perfect order....On one side of the garden is a most beautiful loggia, at one end of which is a lovely fountain that irrigates the orange trees and the rest of the garden by a little canal in the center of the loggia."

Unfortunately, the construction of the Vatican Library in the late sixteenth century across the centre of the cortile means that Bramante's design is now obscured but his ideas of proportion, symmetry and dramatic perspectives were used in many of the great gardens of the Italian Renaissance.

=== The Villa Madama, Rome (1516) ===
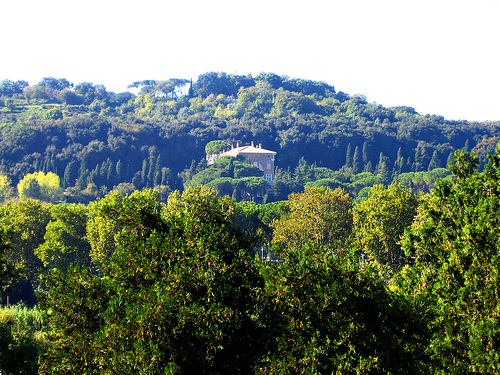
Villa Madama (1516)

The Villa Madama, situated on the slopes of Monte Mario and overlooking Rome, was begun by Pope Leo X and continued by Cardinal Giulio de' Medici (1478–1534). In 1516 Leo X gave the commission to Raphael who was at that time the most famous artist in Rome. Using the ancient text of De Architectura by Vitruvius and the writings of Pliny the Younger, Raphael imagined his own version of an ideal classical villa and garden. His villa had a great circular courtyard, and was divided into a winter apartment and a summer apartment. Passages led from the courtyard to the great loggia from which views could be gained of the garden and Rome. A round tower on the east side was intended as garden room in winter, warmed by the sun coming through glazed windows. The villa overlooked three terraces, one a square, one a circle, and one an oval. The top terrace was to be planted in chestnut trees and firs while the lower terrace was intended for plant beds.

Work on the Villa Madama stopped in 1520, after the death of Raphael, but was then continued by other artists until 1534. They finished one-half of the villa including half of the circular courtyard, and the northwest loggia that was decorated with grotesque frescoes by Giulio Romano and stucco by Giovanni da Udine. Fine surviving features include a fountain of the head of an elephant by Giovanni da Udine and two gigantic stucco figures by Baccio Bandinelli at the entrance of the giardino segreto, the secret garden. The villa is now a state guest house for the Government of Italy.

== Gardens of the High Renaissance ==
The middle of the 16th century saw the construction by the Medici and other wealthy families and individuals, of a series of magnificent gardens that followed the principles of Alberti and Bramante; they were usually sited on a hilltop or slopes of a mountain; had a series of symmetrical terraces, one above the other, along a central axis; the house looked over the garden and landscape beyond and it could itself be seen from the bottom of the garden. Developments in hydrology meant that the gardens were equipped with increasingly elaborate and majestic cascades and fountains, and statues which recalled the grandeur of Ancient Rome.

=== Villa di Castello, Tuscany (1538) ===
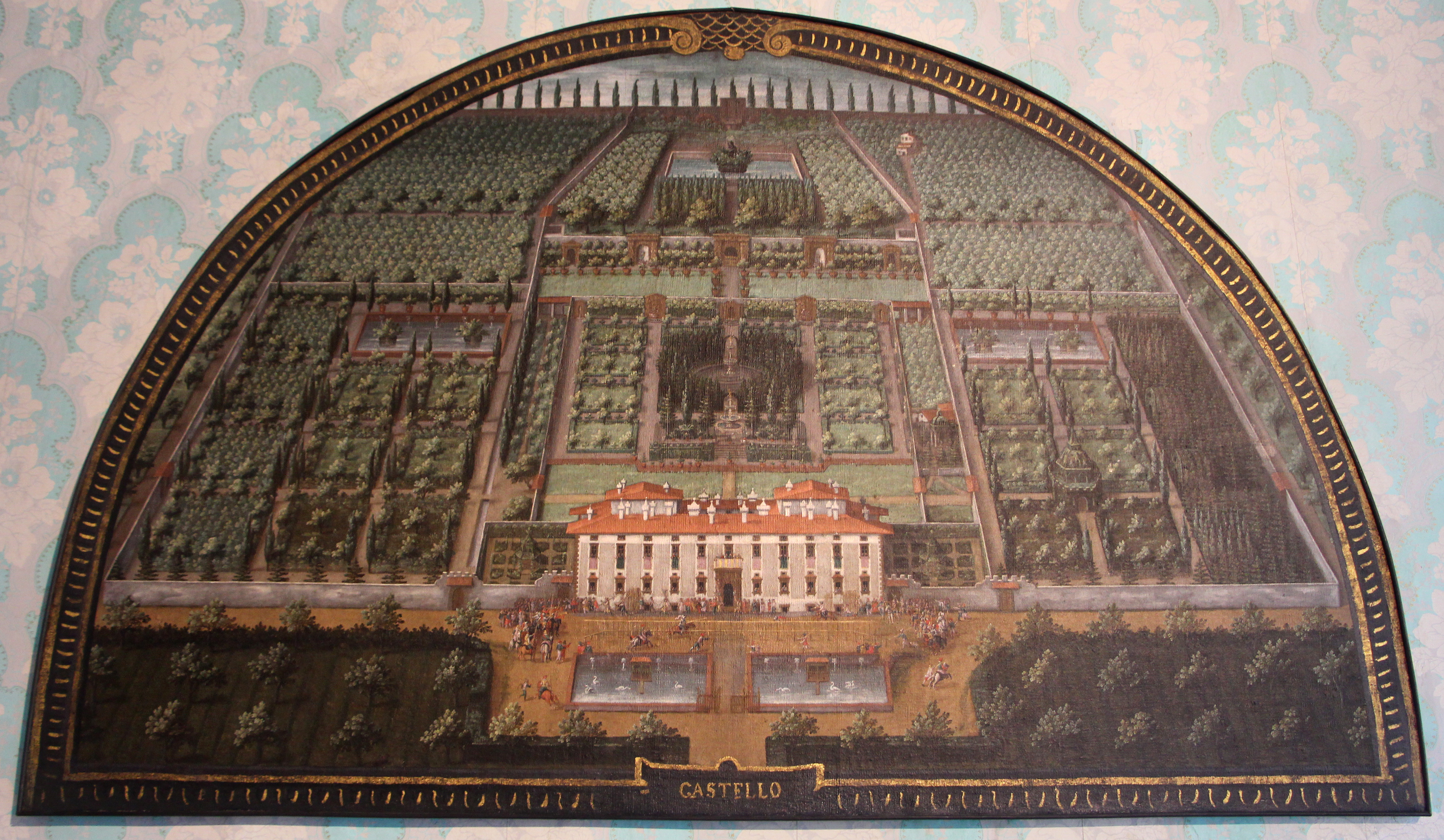
Lunette of Villa di Castello as it appeared in 1599, painted by Giusto Utens

Villa di Castello was the project of Cosimo I de' Medici, first Duke of Tuscany, begun when he was only seventeen. It was designed by Niccolò Tribolo who designed two other gardens: the Giardino dei Semplici (1545) and the Boboli Gardens (1550) for Cosimo.

The garden was laid out on a gentle slope between the villa and the hill of Monte Morello. Tribolo first built a wall across the slope, dividing it into an upper garden filled with orange trees, and a lower garden that was subdivided into garden rooms with walls of hedges, rows of trees and tunnels of citrus trees and cedars. A central axis, articulated by a series of fountains, extended from the villa up to the base of Monte Morello. In this arrangement, the garden had both grand perspectives and enclosed, private spaces.

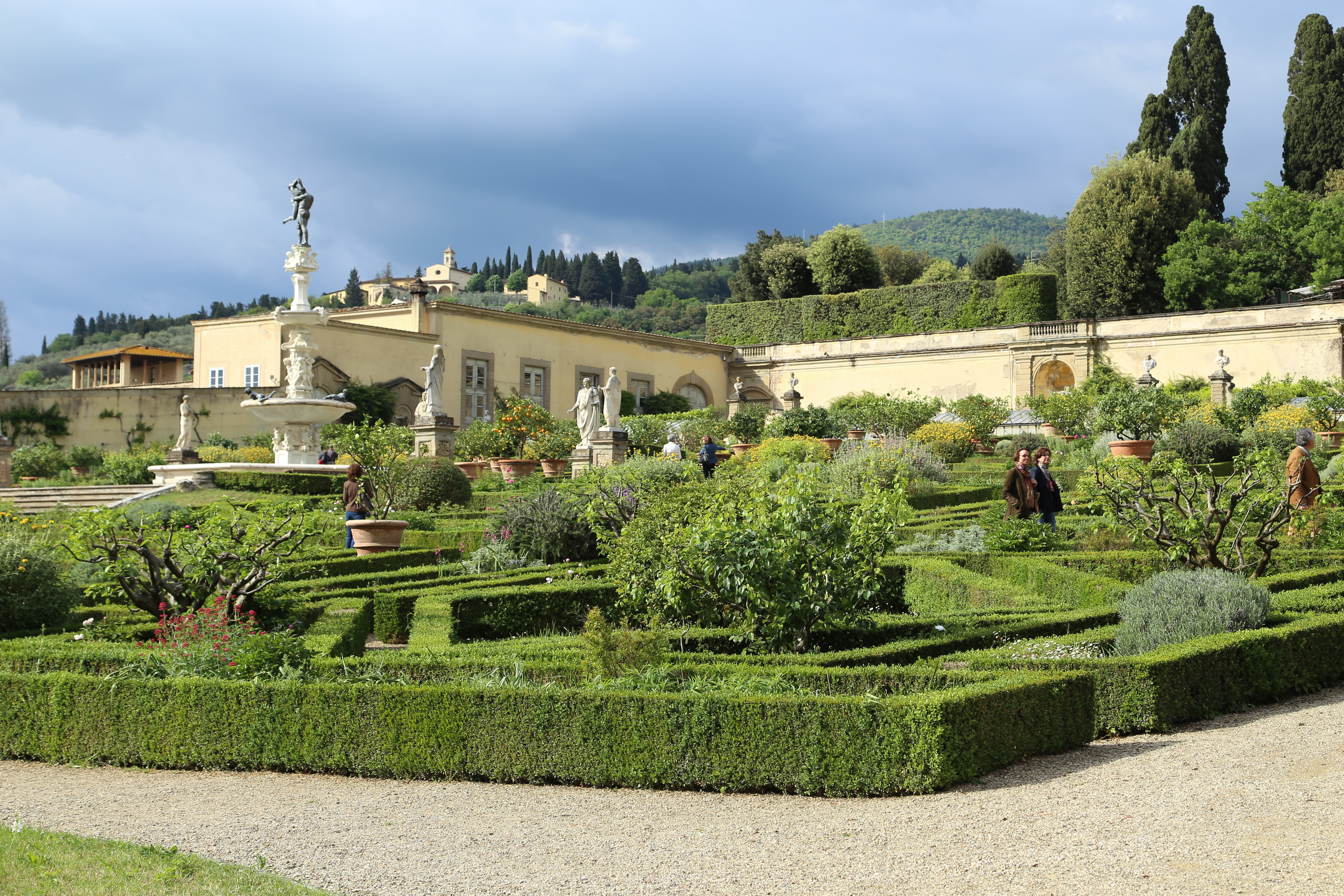
Fountain of Hercules and Antaeus in the gardens of the Villa di Castello, Florence

The lower garden had a large marble fountain that was meant to be seen against a backdrop of dark cypresses, with figures of Hercules and Antaeus. Just above this fountain, in the centre of the garden, was a hedge maze formed by cypress, laurel, myrtle, roses, and box hedges. Concealed in the middle of the maze was another fountain, with a statue of Venus. Around this fountain, Cosimo had bronze pipes installed under the tiles for giochi d'acqua (water games), which were concealed conduits which could be turned on with a key to drench unsuspecting guests. Another unusual feature was a tree house concealed in an ivy-covered oak tree, with a square dining room inside the tree.

At the far end of the garden and set against a wall, Tribolo created an elaborate grotto, decorated with mosaics, pebbles, sea shells, imitation stalactites, and niches with groups of statues of domestic and exotic animals and birds, many with real horns, antlers and tusks. The animals symbolized the virtues and accomplishments of past members of Medici family. Water flowed from the beaks, wings and claws of the animals into marble basins below each niche. A gate could close suddenly behind visitors, and they would be soaked by hidden fountains.

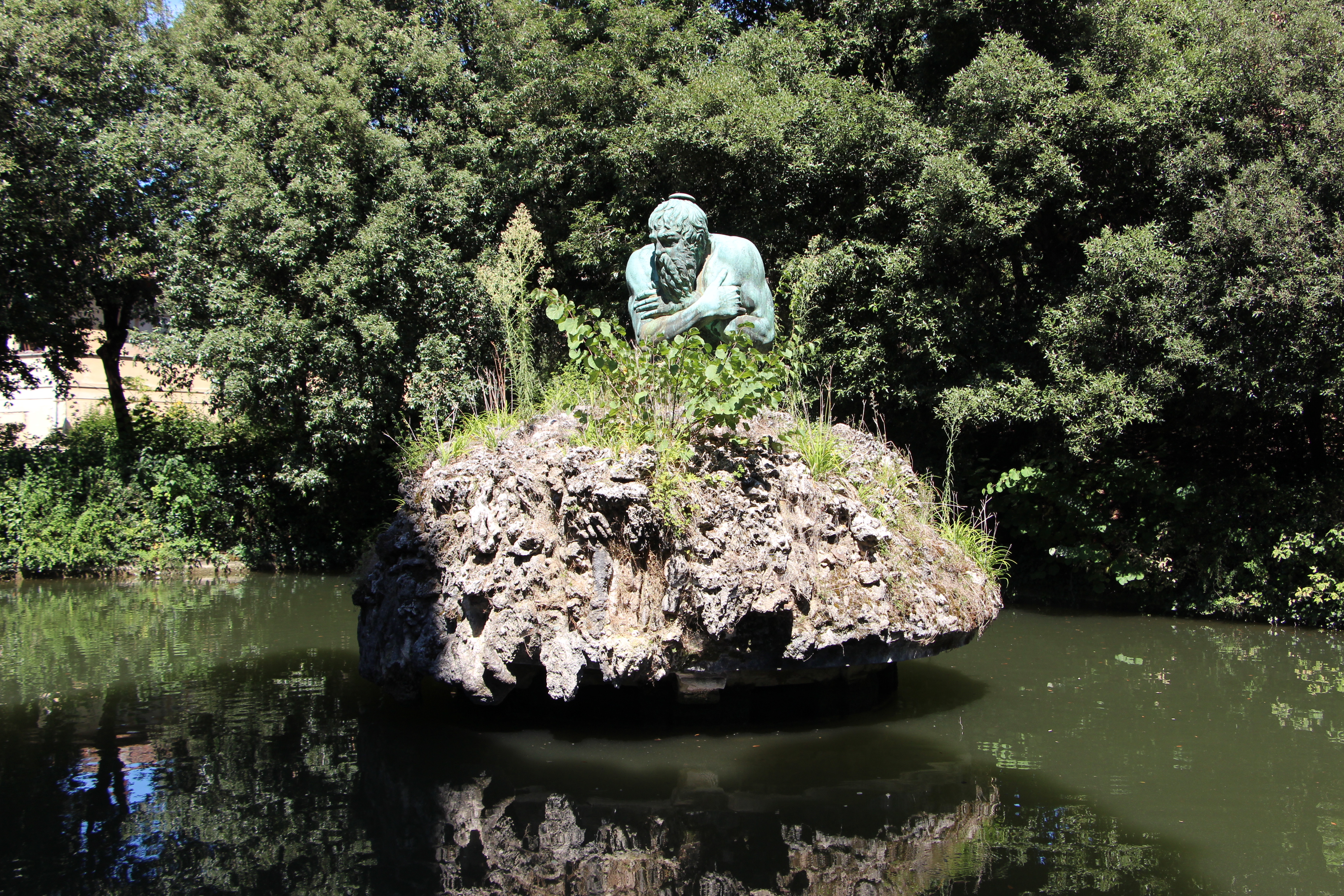
Fountain of January by Bartolomeo Ammannati

Above the grotto, on the hillside, was small woodland, or bosco, with a pond in the center. In the pond is a bronze statue of a shivering giant, with cold water running down over his head, which represents either the month of January or the Apennine Mountains.

When the last of the Medici died in 1737, the garden began to be altered by its new owners, the House of Lorraine; the maze was demolished and the statue of Venus was moved to the Villa La Petraia, but long before then, the garden had been described by many ambassadors and foreign visitors and had become famous throughout Europe. Its principles of perspective, proportion and symmetry, its geometric planting beds and rooms with walls of trees and hedges, were adapted in both the gardens of the French Renaissance and the garden à la française which followed.

=== Villa d'Este at Tivoli (1550–1572) ===
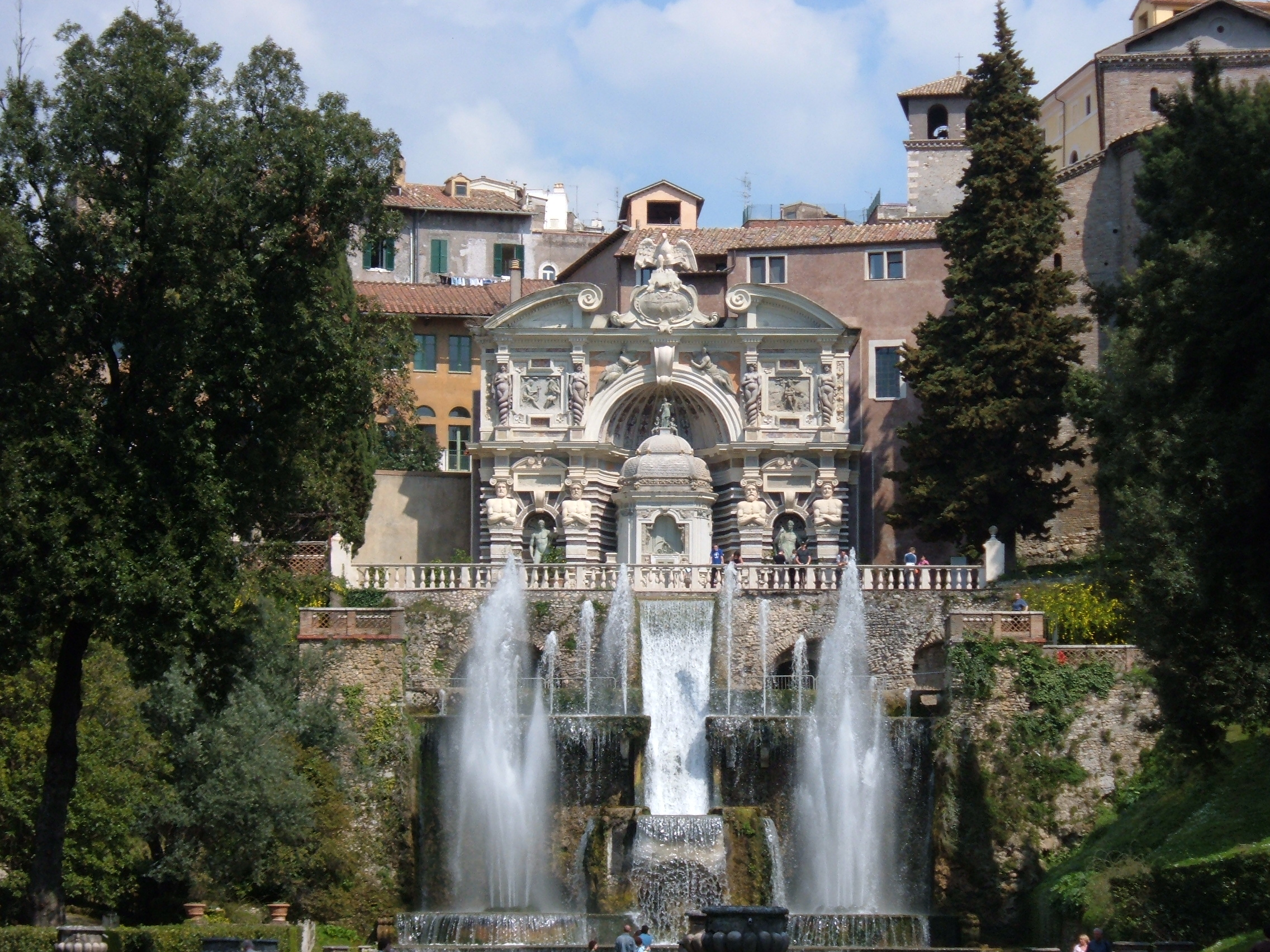
The Neptune Fountain (foreground) and Water Organ (background) in the gardens at the Villa d'Este

The Villa d'Este at Tivoli is one of the grandest and best-preserved of the Italian Renaissance gardens. It was created by Cardinal Ippolito II d'Este, son of Alfonso I d'Este, the Duke of Ferrara, and Lucrezia Borgia. He was made a Cardinal at the age of twenty-nine and became governor of Tivoli in 1550. To develop his residence, he took over a former Franciscan convent, and for the garden he bought the adjoining steep hillside and the valley below. His chosen architect was Pirro Ligorio, who had been carrying out excavations for Ippolito at the nearby ruins of the ancient Villa Adriana, or Hadrian's Villa, the extensive country residence of the Roman Emperor, Hadrian, that had numerous elaborate water features.

Ligorio created the garden as a series of terraces descending the steep hillside at the edge of the mountains overlooking the plain of Latium. The terraces were connected by gates and grand stairways starting from a terrace below the villa and traversing down to the Fountain of Dragons at the foot of the garden. The stairway was crossed by five traversal alleys on the different levels, which were divided into rooms by hedges and trellises covered with vines. At the crossing points of the stairway and the alleys there were pavilions, fruit trees, and aromatic plants. At the top, the promenade used by the Cardinal passed below the villa and led in one direction to the grotto of Diana, and in the other to the grotto of Asclepius.

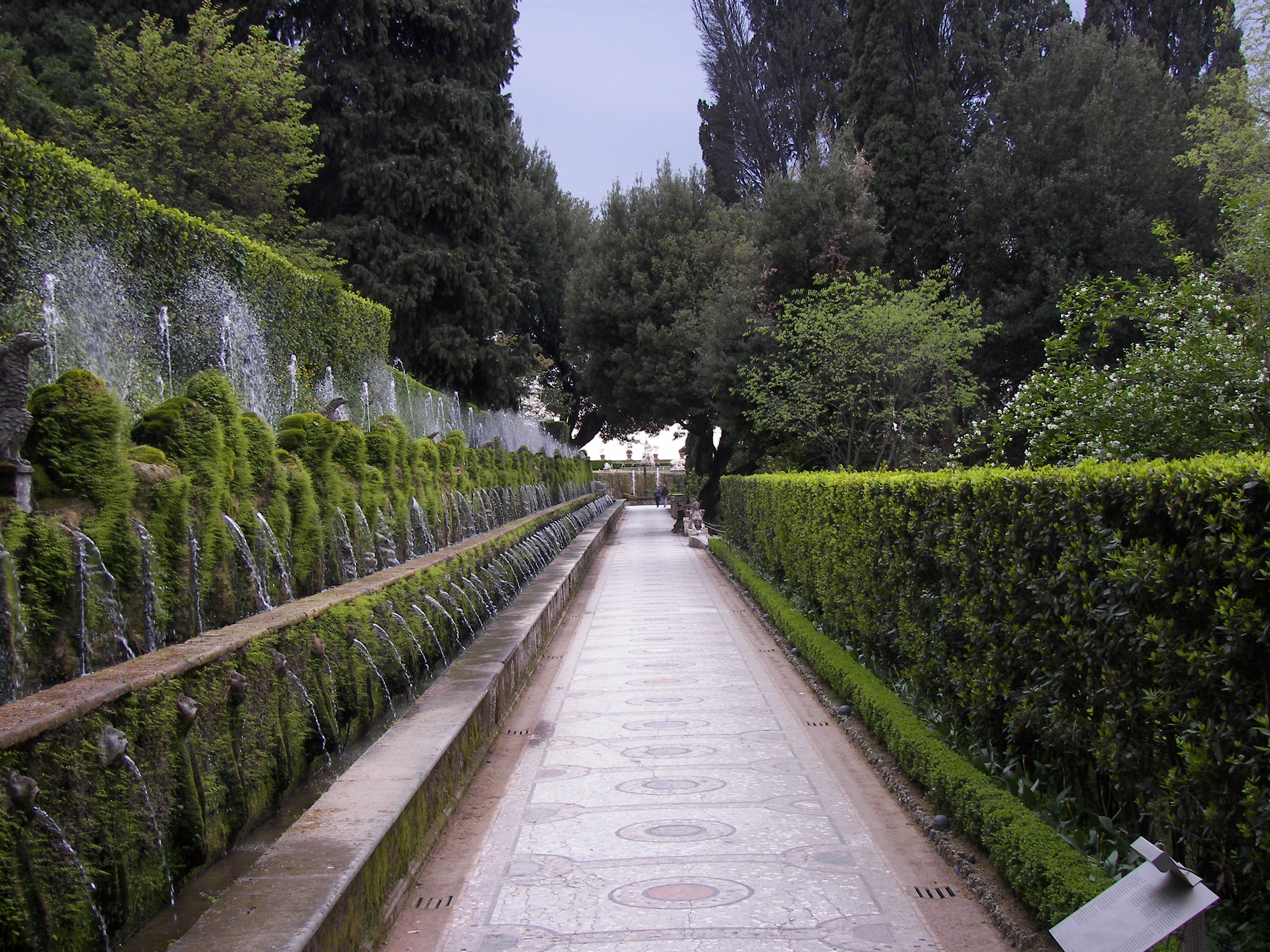
Alley of one hundred fountains, Villa d'Este

The glory of the Villa d'Este was the system of fountains, fed by two aqueducts that Ligorio constructed from the River Aniene. In the centre of the garden, the alley of one hundred fountains (which actually had two hundred fountains), crossed the hillside, connecting the Oval Fountain with the Fountain of Rome, which was decorated with models of the famous landmarks of Rome. On a lower level, another alley passed by the Fountain of Dragons and joined the Fountain of Proserpina with the Fountain of the Owl. Still lower, an alley of fishponds connected the Fountain of the Organ to the site of a proposed Fountain of Neptune.

Each fountain and path told a story, linking the d'Este family to the legends of Hercules and Hippolytus (or Ippolito), the mythical son of Theseus and Hippolyta, the Queen of the Amazons. The central axis led to the Fountain of Dragons, which illustrated one of the labours of Hercules, and three other statues of Hercules were found in the garden. The myth of Ippolito, the mythical namesake of the owner, was illustrated by two grottos, that of Asclepius and Diana.

The Fountain of the Owl used a series of bronze pipes like flutes to make the sound of birds but the most famous feature of the garden was the great Organ Fountain. It was described by the French philosopher Michel de Montaigne, who visited the garden in 1580: "The music of the Organ Fountain is true music, naturally created...made by water which falls with great violence into a cave, rounded and vaulted, and agitates the air, which is forced to exit through the pipes of an organ. Other water, passing through a wheel, strikes in a certain order the keyboard of the organ. The organ also imitates the sound of trumpets, the sound of cannon, and the sound of muskets, made by the sudden fall of water ...

The garden was substantially changed after the death of the Cardinal and in the 17th century, and many statues were sold, but the basic features remain, and the Organ Fountain has recently been restored and plays music once again.

== Mannerism and the gardens of the Late Renaissance ==
Mannerism was a style which developed in painting in the 1520s, which defied the traditional rules of Renaissance painting. "Mannerist paintings were intensely stylish, polished and complex, their composition bizarre, the subject matter fantastic." This also describes other mannerist gardens which appeared beginning about 1560.

=== Villa Della Torre (1559) ===
The Villa Della Torre, built for Giulio Della Torre (1480–1563), a law professor and humanist scholar in Verona, was a parody of the classical rules of Vitruvius; the peristyle of the building was in the perfectly harmonious Vitruvius style, but some of the stones were rough-cut and of different sizes and decorated with masks which sprayed water, which jarred the classical harmony. "The building was deformed: it seemed to be caught in a strange, amorphous condition, somewhere crude rustic simplicity and classical perfection." The fireplaces inside were in the forms of the mouths of gigantic masks. Outside, the garden was filled with disturbing architectural elements, including a grotto whose entrance represented the mouth of hell, with eyes that showed fires burning inside.

=== Sacro Bosco at Bomarzo, Lazio (1552–1584) ===
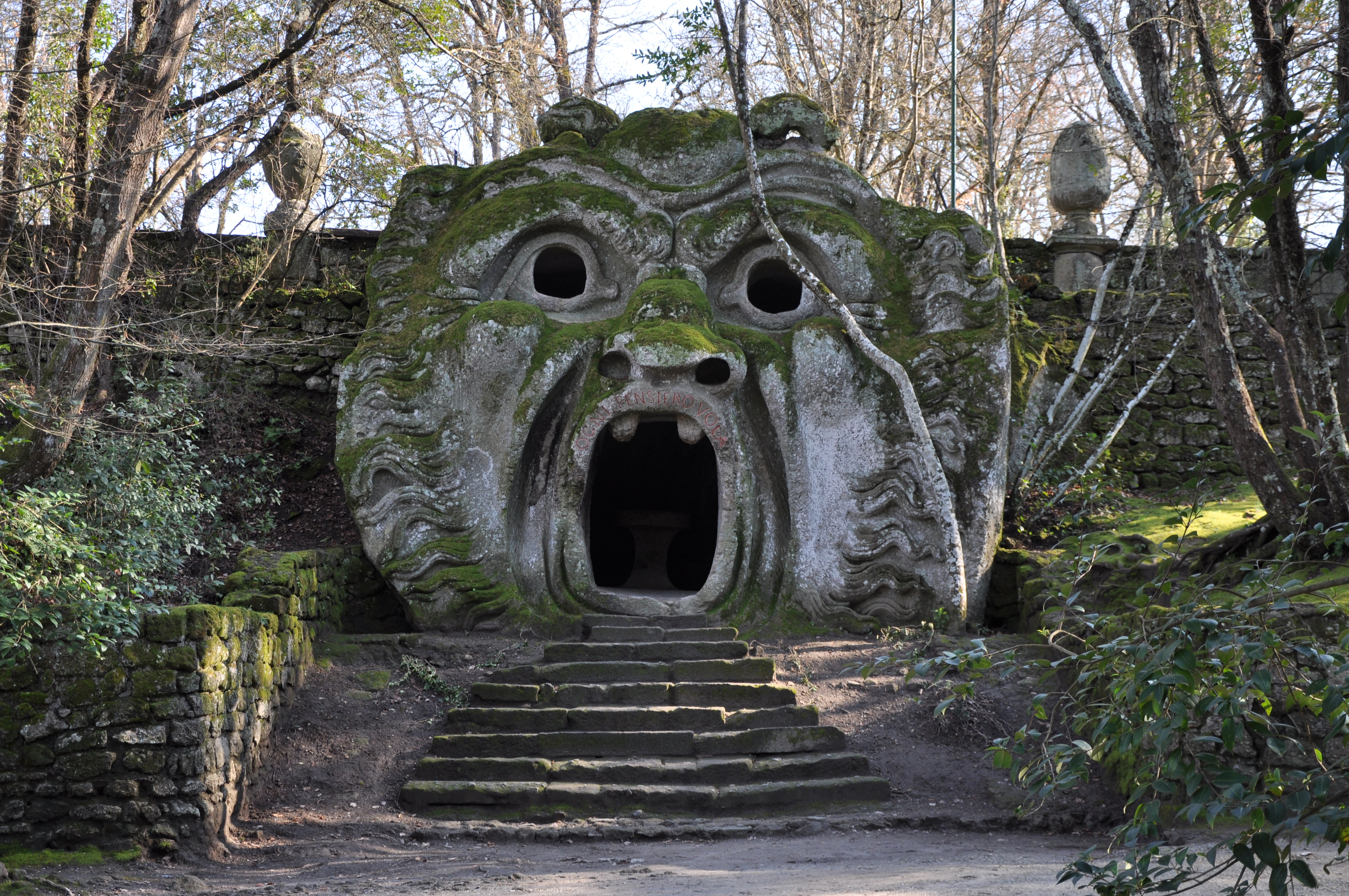
Sacro Bosco, the ogre at the mouth of hell (1552–1584)

The Sacro Bosco, or "Sacred Wood," was the most famous and extravagant of the Mannerist gardens. It was created for Pier Francesco Orsini (1523–84) near the village of Bomarzo. It was witty and irreverent, and violated all the rules of Renaissance gardens; it had no symmetry, no order, and no focal point. An inscription in the garden said: "You who have travelled the world in search of great and stupendous marvels, come here, where there are horrendous faces, elephants, lions, ogres and dragons."

The garden was filled with enormous statues, reached by wandering paths. It included a mouth of hell, a house that seemed to be falling over, fantastic animals and figures, many of them carved of rough volcanic rock in place in the garden. Some of the scenes were taken from the romantic epic poem Orlando Furioso by Ludovico Ariosto, others from works by Dante Alighieri and Francesco Petrarca. As one inscription in the garden notes, the Sacro Bosco "resembles only itself, and nothing else."

== The first botanical gardens ==
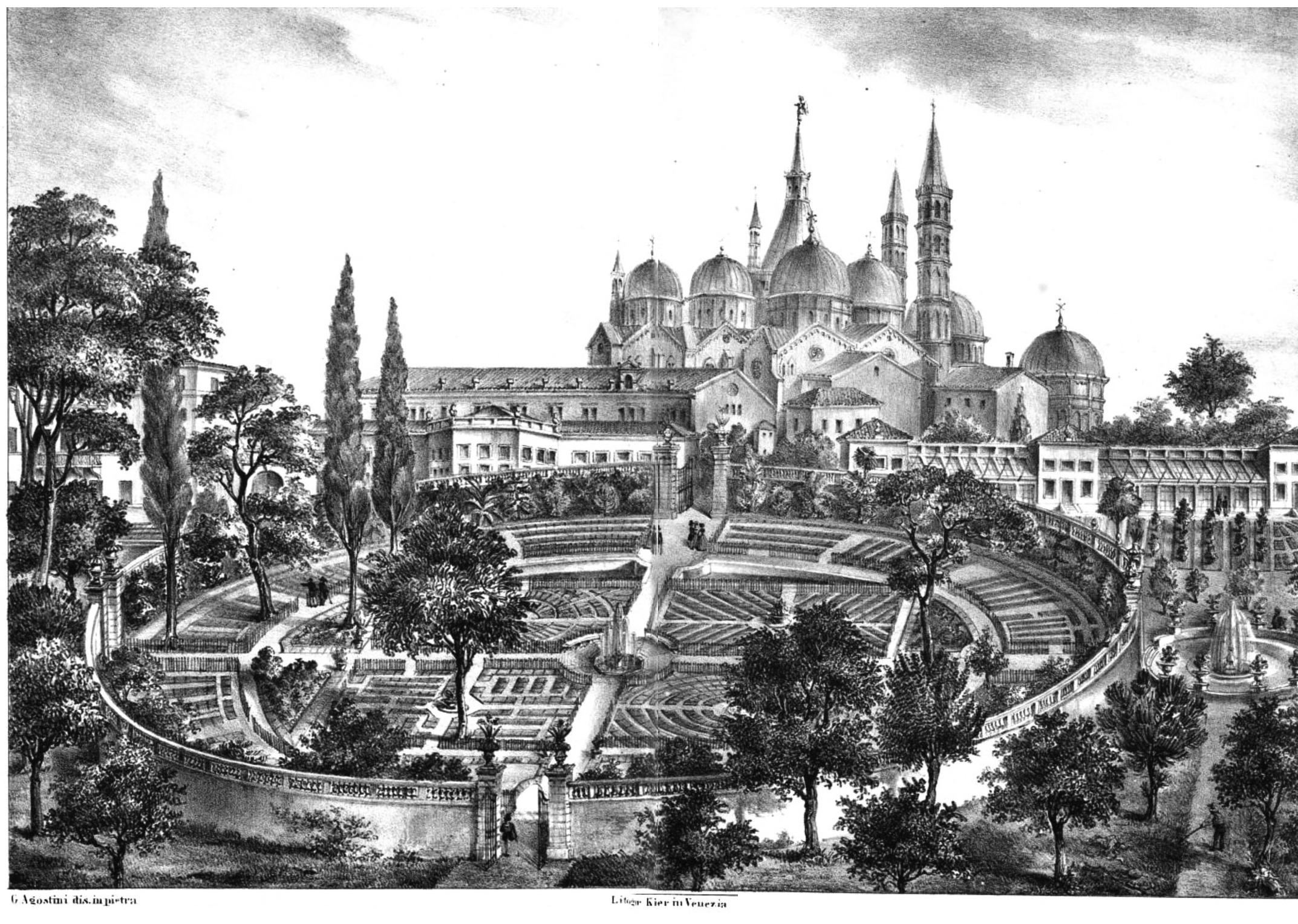
The Botanical Gardens of Padua (1543), from a contemporary engraving in the Basilica di Sant'Antonio.

The Italian Renaissance also saw a revolution in the study of botany through the systematic classification of plants and the creation of the first botanical gardens. During the Middle Ages, plants were studied for the medicinal uses. Until the 16th century, the standard work on botany was De Materia Medica written in the 1st century AD by a Greek physician, Pedanius Dioscorides, that described six hundred plants but lacked many of the native plants of Italy and had vague descriptions with stylized and inexact illustrations. In 1533, the University of Padua created the first chair of botany and appointed Francesco Bonafede as the first Professor Simplicium- professor of 'simples,' or medicinal plants. In 1545, a scholar from the medical school of the University of Padua, Pietro Andrea Mattioli, wrote a new book on medicinal herbs, Commentarii in libros sex Pedanii Dioscoridis, which, in successive editions, systematically described and gave the medicinal uses of twelve hundred different plants. Such scientific work was aided by sailors and explorers returning from the New World, Asia and Africa, who brought back samples of plants unknown in Europe.

In June 1543, the University of Padua created the world's first botanical garden, the Orto botanico di Padova, and the University of Pisa followed with its own garden, the Orto botanico di Pisa, in 1545. By 1591, the garden at Padua had over 1,168 different plants and trees, including a fan palm tree brought from Egypt. In 1545, in Florence, Cosimo de' Medici founded the Giardino dei Semplici, the garden of medicinal herbs. Soon the medical schools of the universities of Bologna, Ferrara and Sassari all had their own botanical gardens filled with exotic plants from around the world.

== Other gardens of the Italian Renaissance ==
- Palazzo e giardino Giusti a Verona (1580)

== Gallery ==
Gallery of Italian Renaissance Gardens
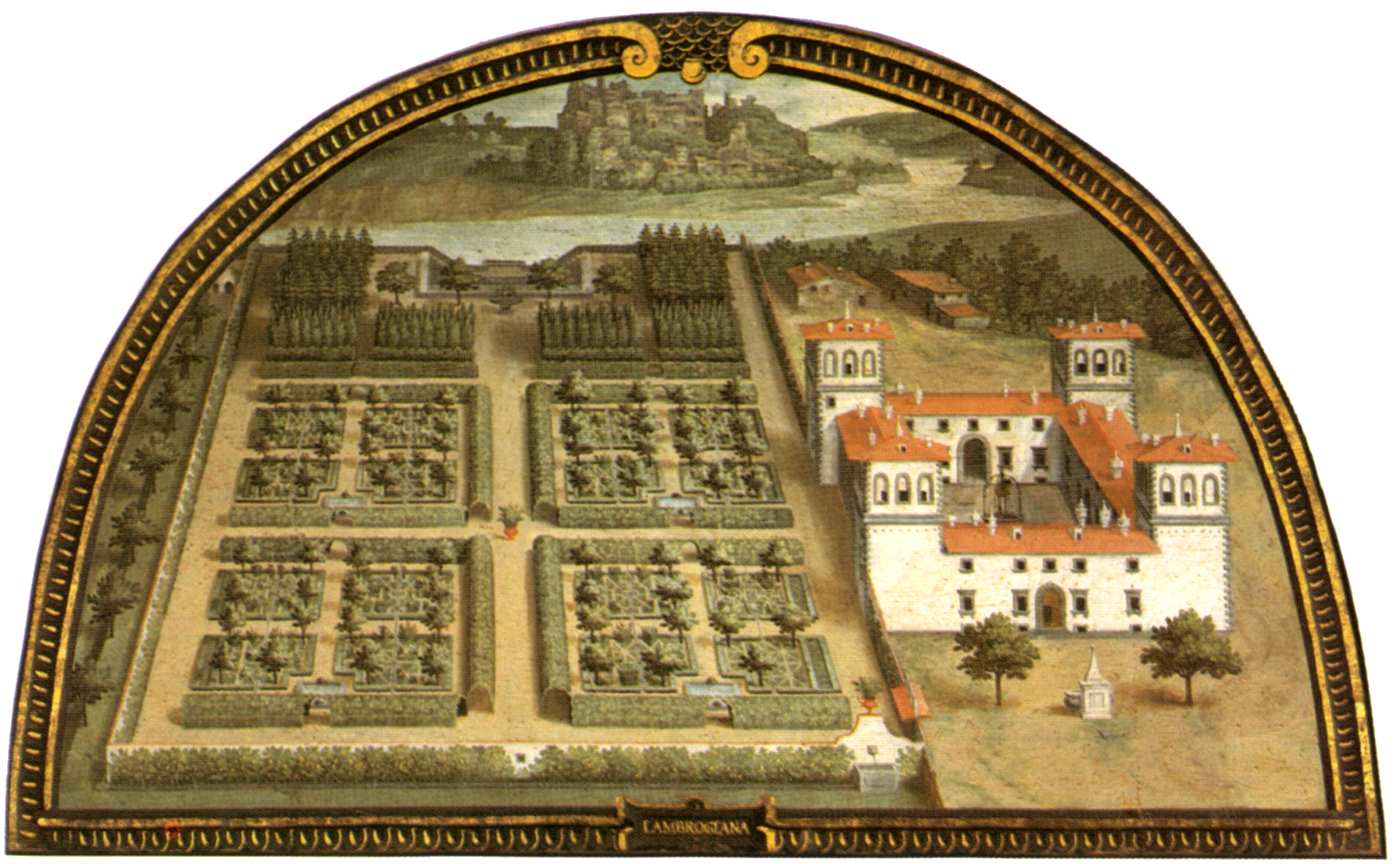
Lunette by Giusto Utens of Villa Medicea L'Ambrogiana (1598)

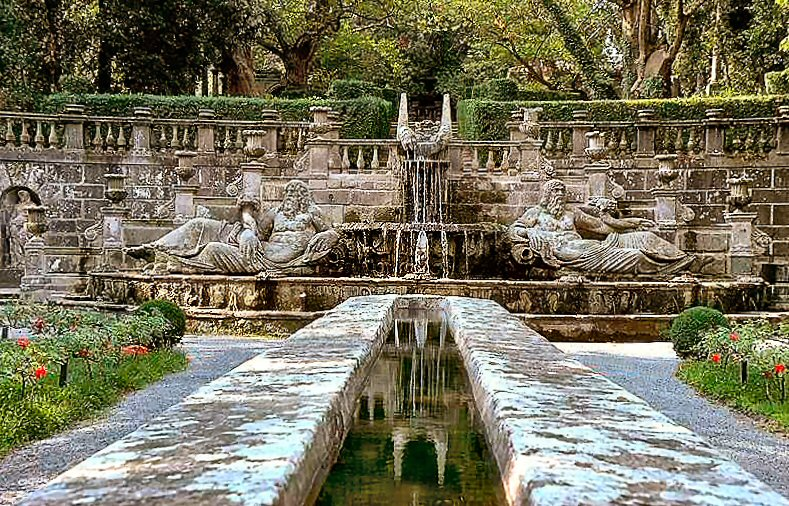
Villa Lante, (1570–1575)

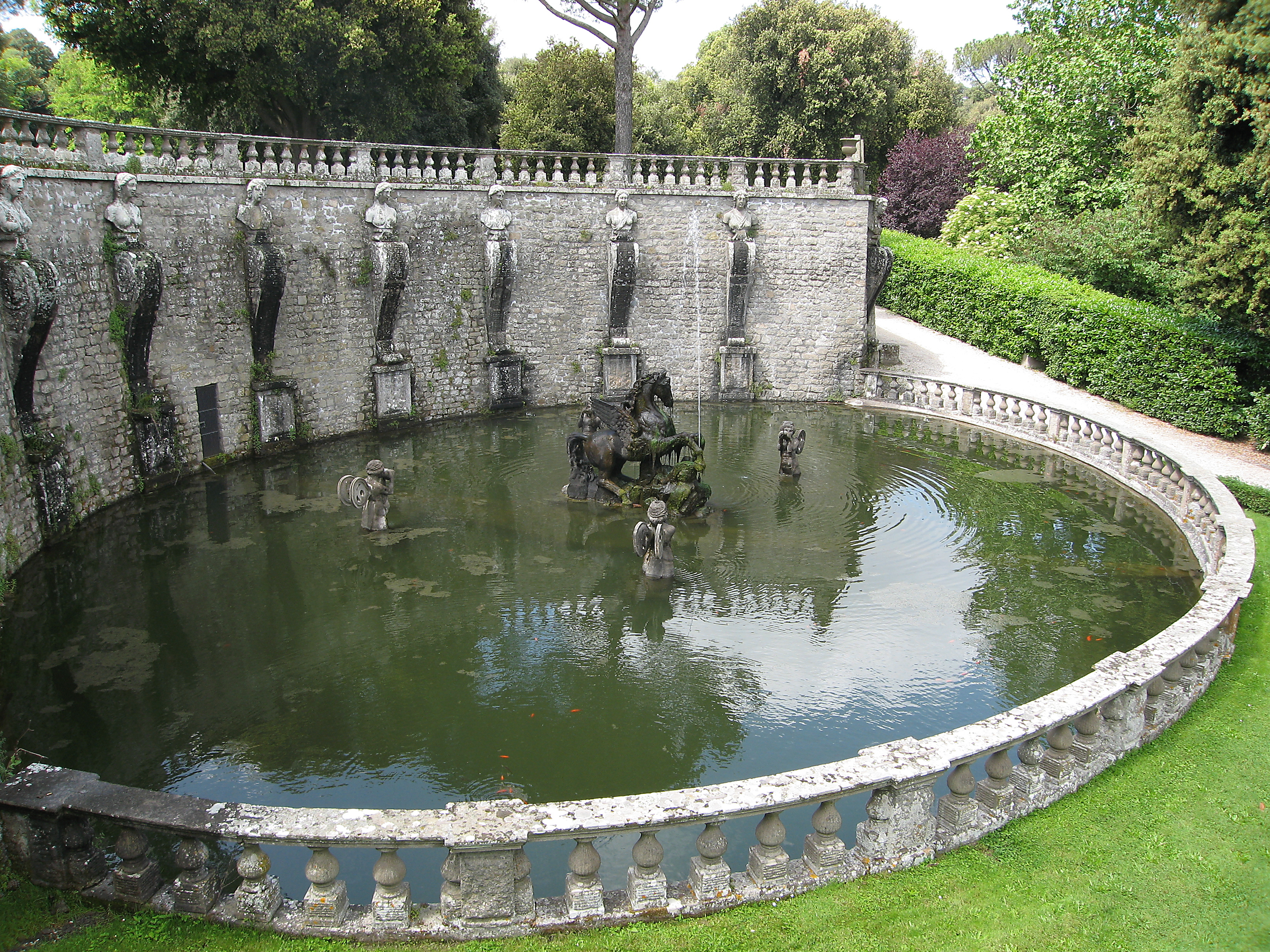
Pegasus Fountain at Villa Lante (1570–1575)

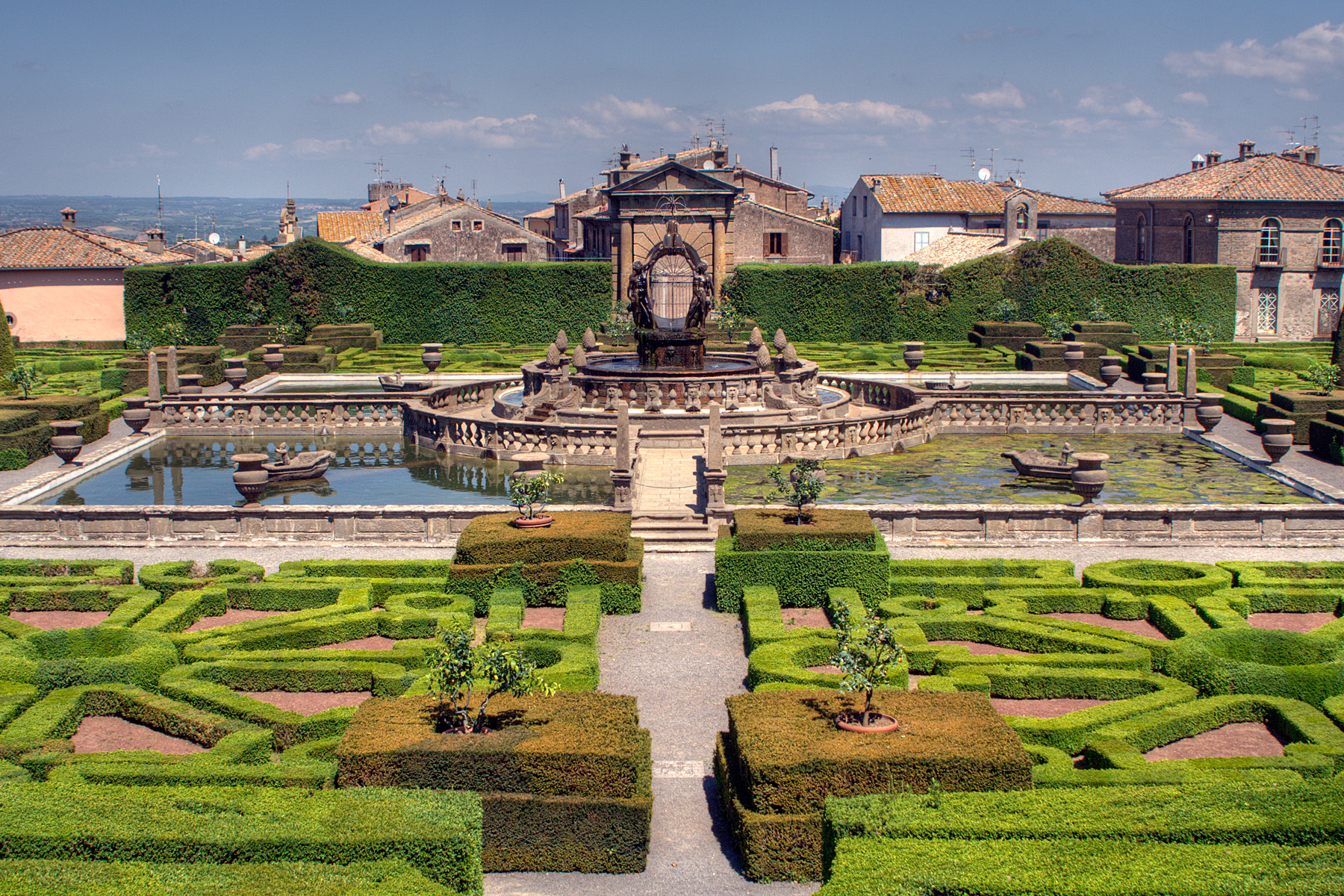
Gardens of the Villa Lante

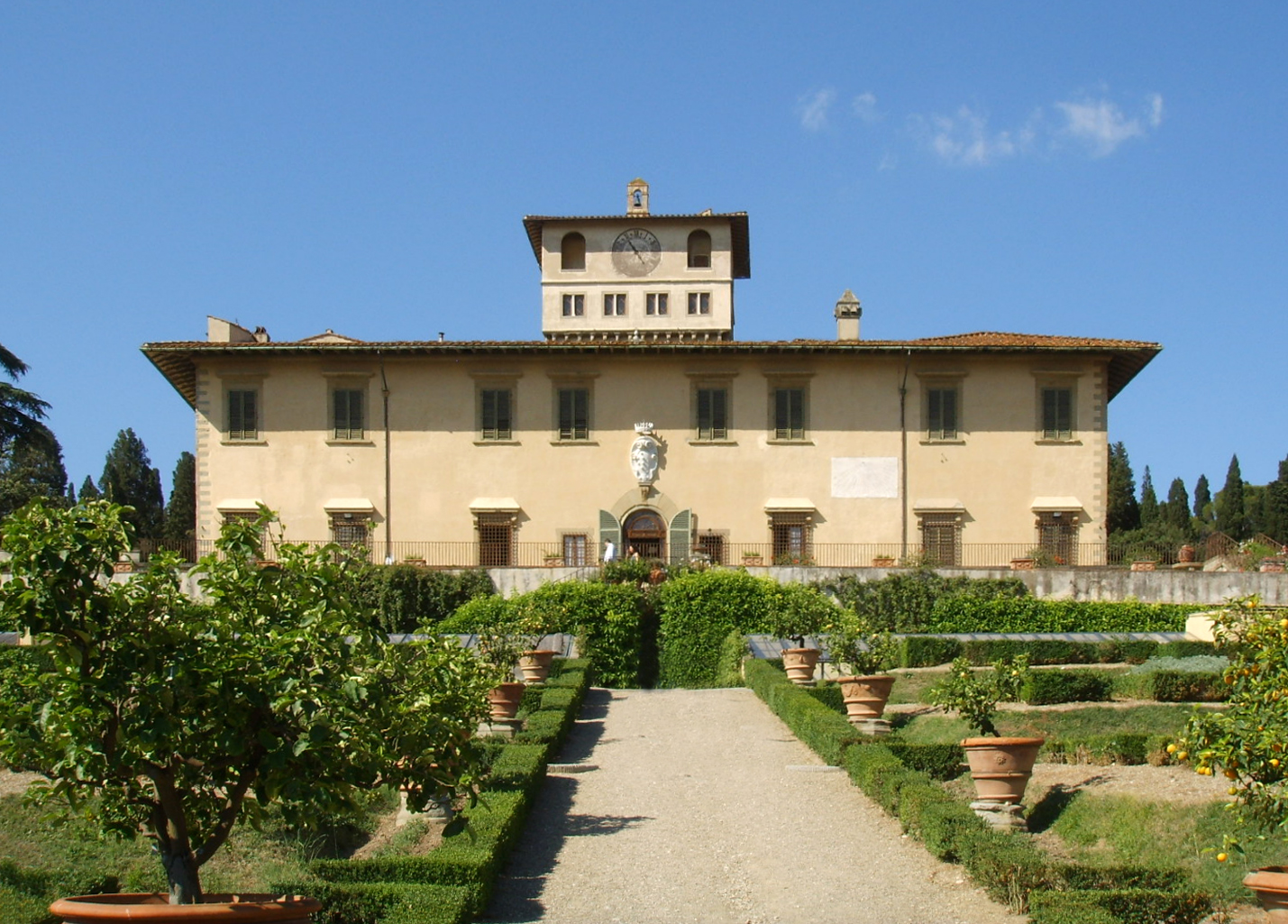
Villa La Petraia, Florence, today

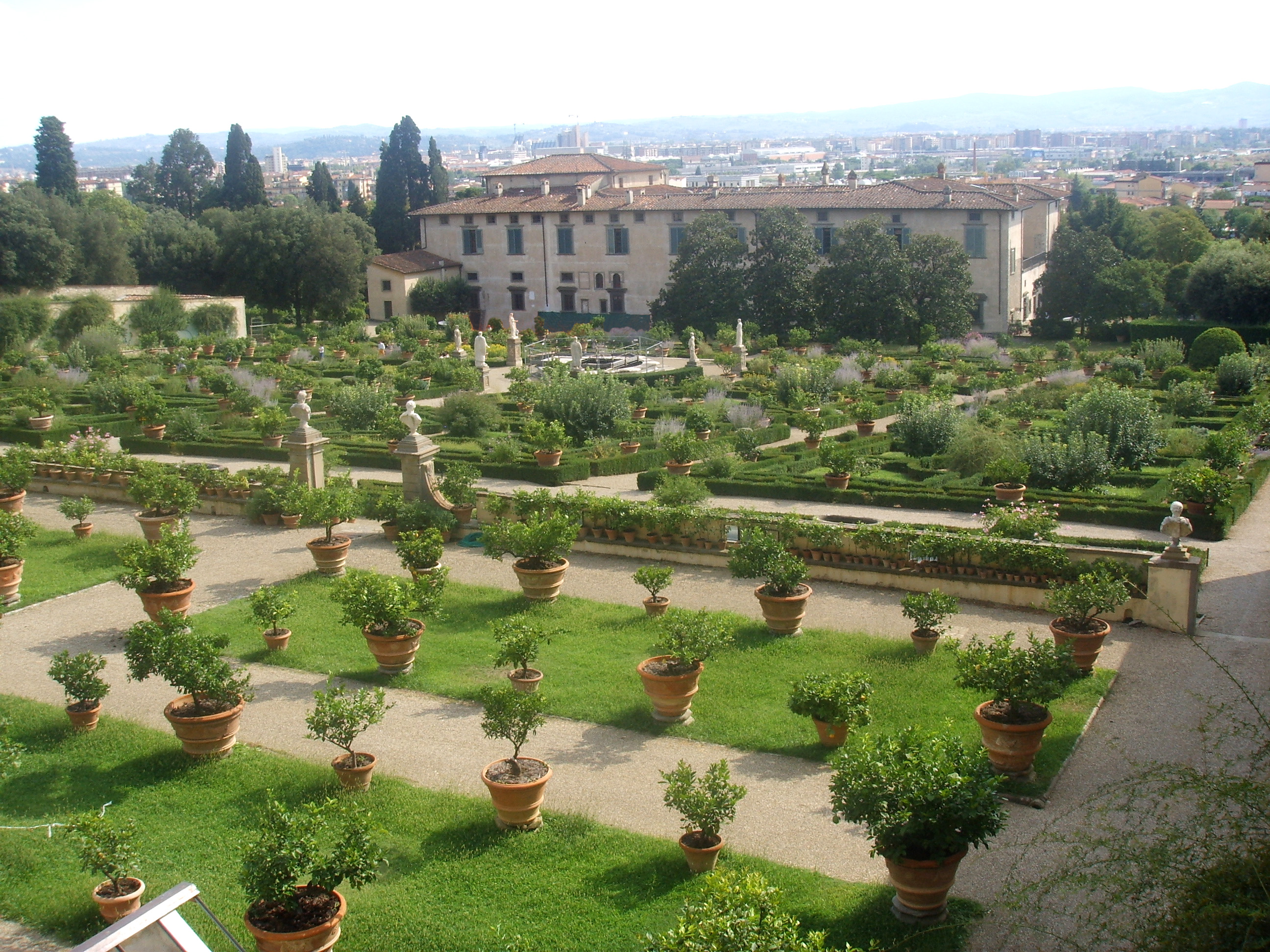
Villa di Castello, Florence

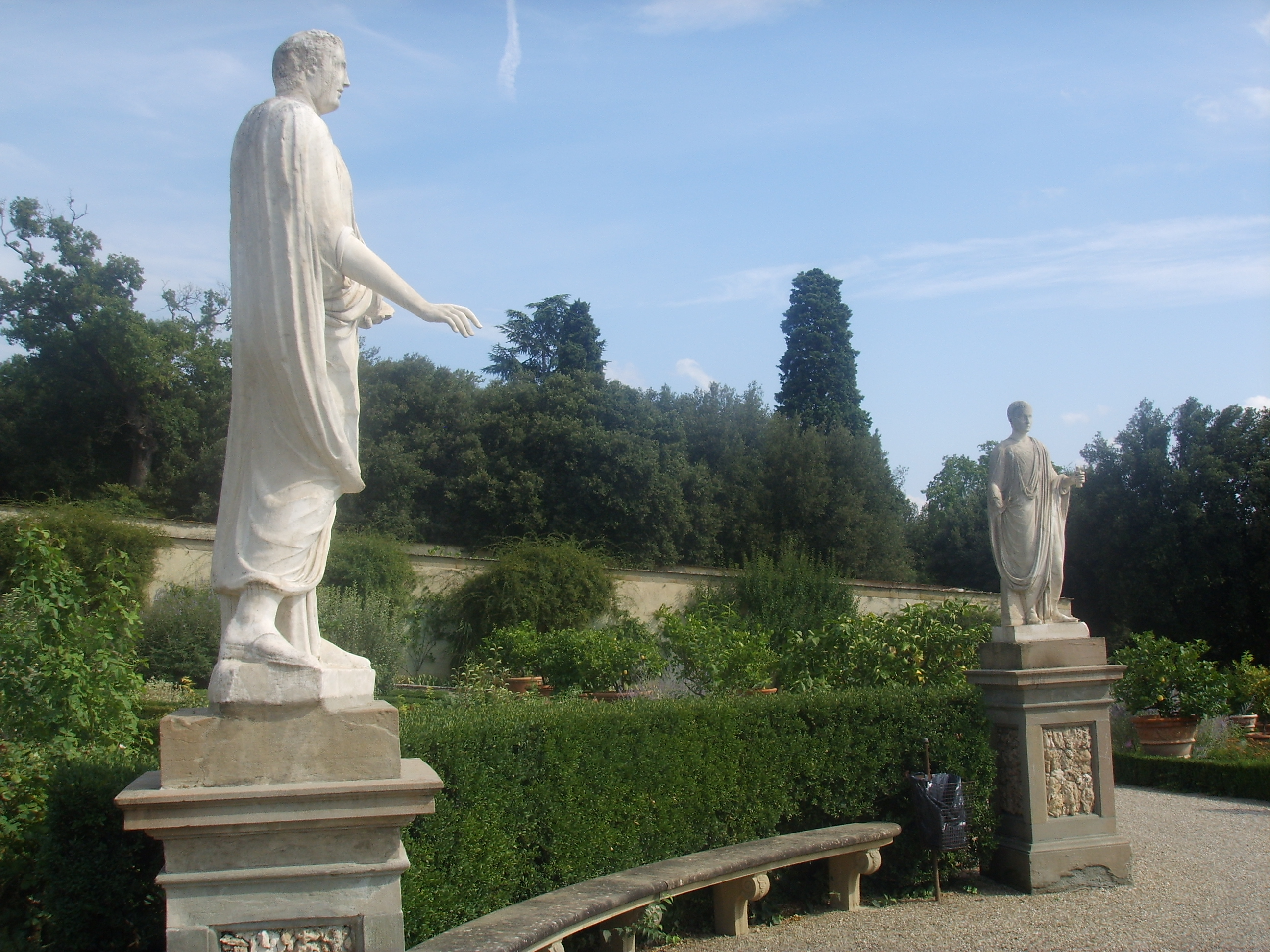
Villa di Castello

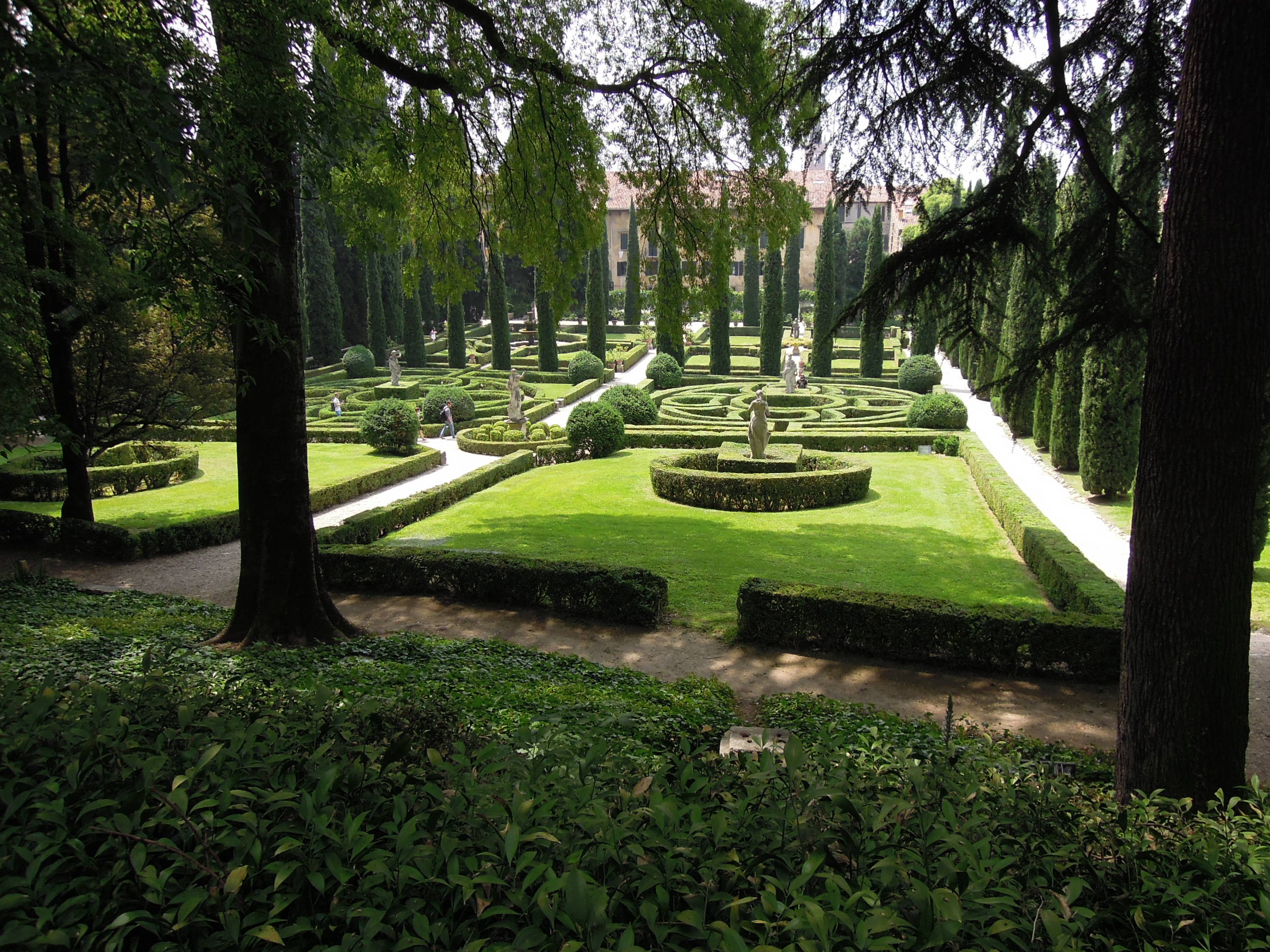
Palazzo Giusti garden

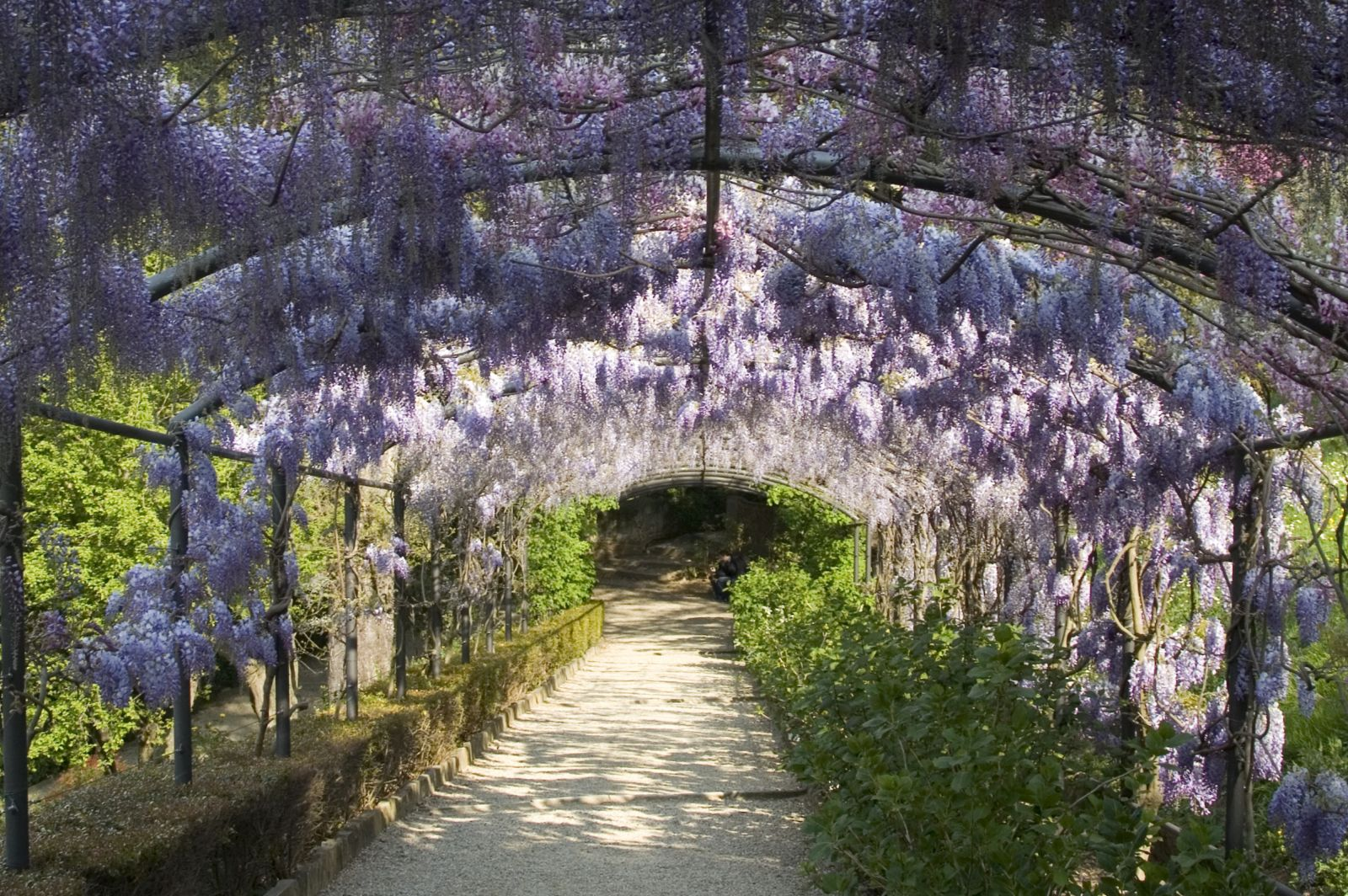
Wisteria pergola in the Giardino Bardini

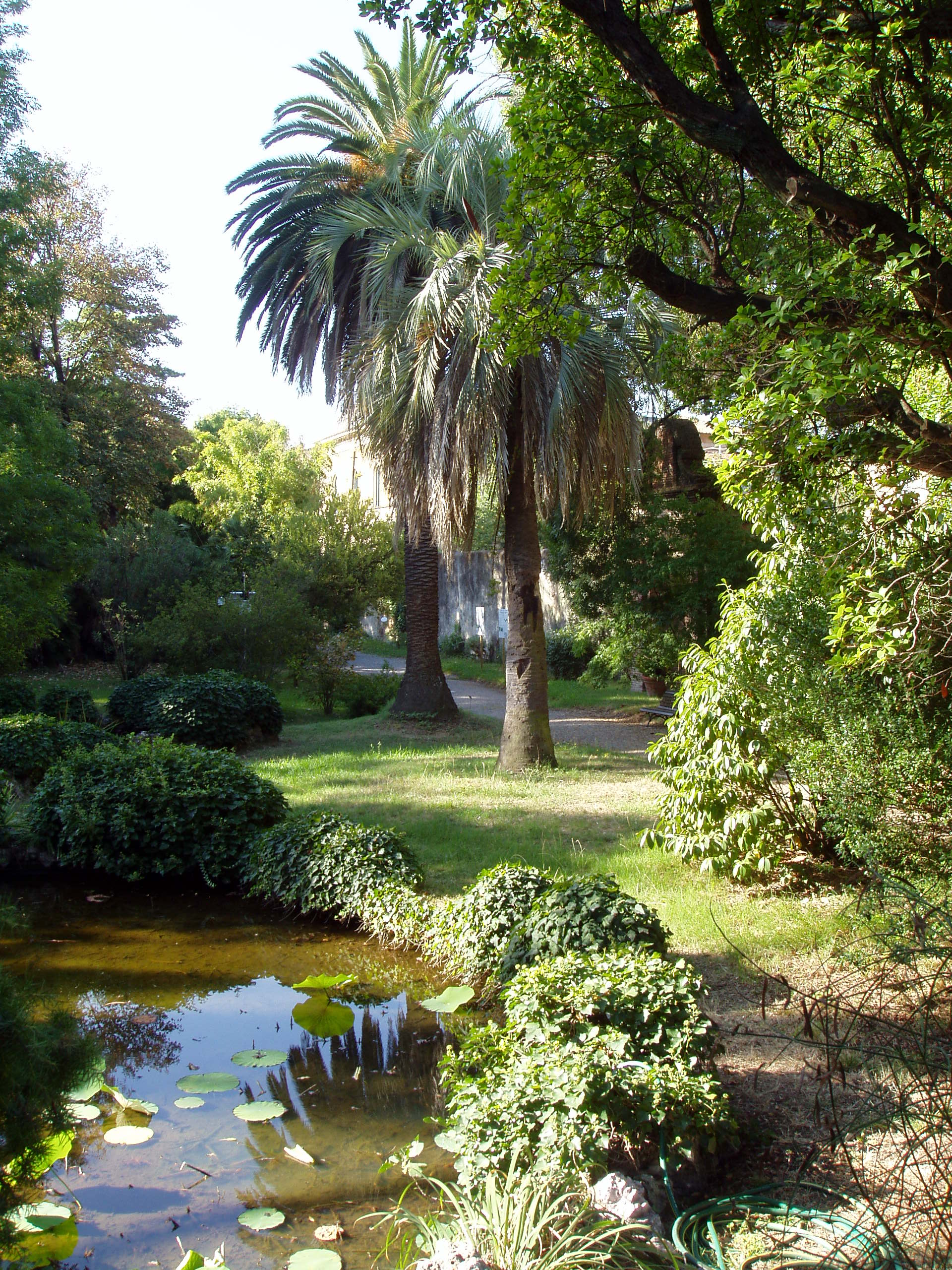
The Orto botanico di Pisa

== See also ==
- Giardino all'italiana
- Grandi Giardini Italiani
- List of gardens in Italy
- Renaissance garden
