= Jeux d'eau =

Water features in the Italian and French gardening styles

Jeux d'eau (French: [ʒø d‿o]; French for 'water games'; Italian: giochi d'acqua), is an umbrella term in the history of gardens for the water features that were introduced into mid-16th century Mannerist Italian gardens. The German-language equivalent is Wasserspiele.

== History ==
Pools and fountains had been a feature from Roman times, but hydraulic engineers first took full advantage of characteristic sloping sites of villas in the hills surrounding Lazio, where there was copious available water. Giacomo Barozzi da Vignola's catene d'aqua (water chains) and water stairs, fountains, cascades, jets, pools and canals at Villa Farnese at Caprarola and Villa Lante at Bagnaia led the way. At Villa Lante a rill of water flows down the center of a stone picnic table.

The water garden at Villa d'Este at Tivoli inspired composer Franz Liszt to write his Jeux d'eau à la Villa d'Este.

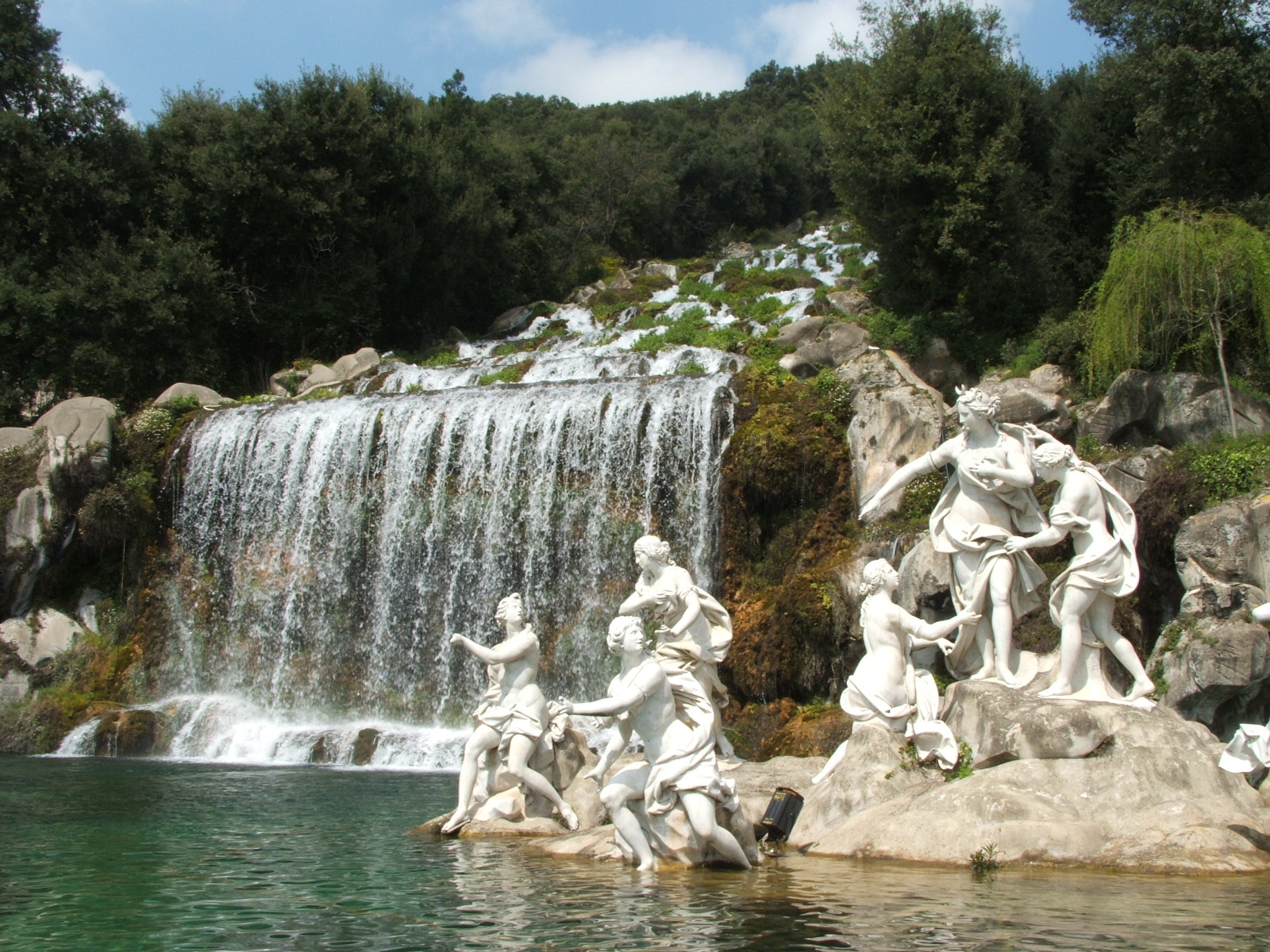
Cascade and fountain at the Royal Palace of Caserta

French 16th-century gardens in the Ile-de-France were generally in flat terrain that did not lend itself to elaborate jeux d'eau. Fountains, bassins (pools in raised basins) and canals were more typical of French water features. For the jeux d'eau at Versailles, a watermill-driven pumping station (the machine de Marly, at the time being the most powerful machine in Europe) and elaborate aqueducts had to be constructed to bring water from many kilometers away.

Sloping sites at the palaces of Caserta and Peterhof permitted grand cascades. At Caserta, a rill of water even flows down the handrail of a staircase balustrade.

A favorite jeu d'eau was the practical joke of surprise water jets that could be turned on suddenly by a gardener accomplice turning a hidden wheel, trapping guests or soaking their finery. Joking water jets remained a feature in German gardens well into the 19th century.

In the 1930s, Otto Przystawik invented the novelty musical fountain feature that came to be called "dancing waters". Early systems in displays and nightclubs were manually operated by hand pumps and levers. Harold Steinman, the New York-based promoter of "Holiday on Ice", spotted the Przystawik display in a Berlin nightclub. He took the machine on tour with his roller-skating review, where its success inspired him to send out duplicates on tours during the 1950s and 60s. In the later 20th century, programmable "dancing waters" became a feature of novelty fountains associated with resort hotels, where they were combined with laser light shows. Elaborate moving water effects and shifting colored lighting were coordinated with recorded music. Such features draw crowds in Las Vegas, where they were initiated as part of Liberace's stage show and have been satirized in a Simpsons episode.
