= Villa Lante =

Mannerist garden in central Italy

Coordinates: 42°25′33″N 12°9′17″E

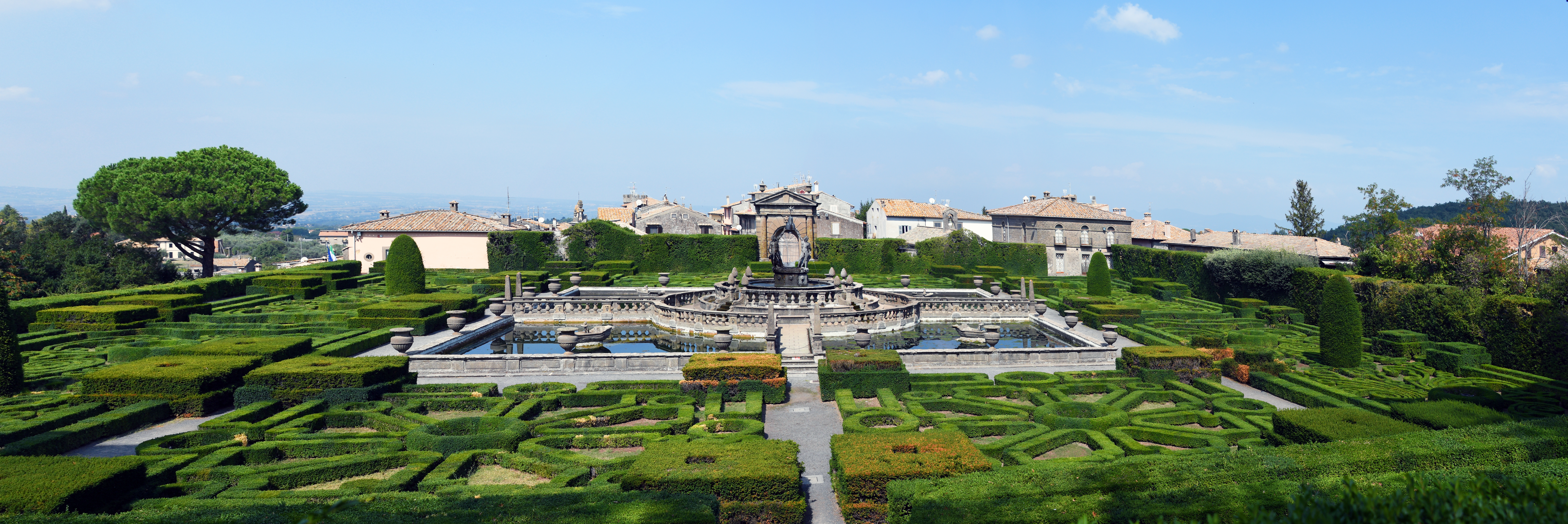
Gardens of the Villa Lante

Villa Lante is a Mannerist garden of surprise in Bagnaia, Viterbo, central Italy, attributed to Jacopo Barozzi da Vignola.

Villa Lante did not become well known until it passed to Ippolito Lante Montefeltro della Rovere, Duke of Bomarzo, in the 17th century, when it was already 100 years old.

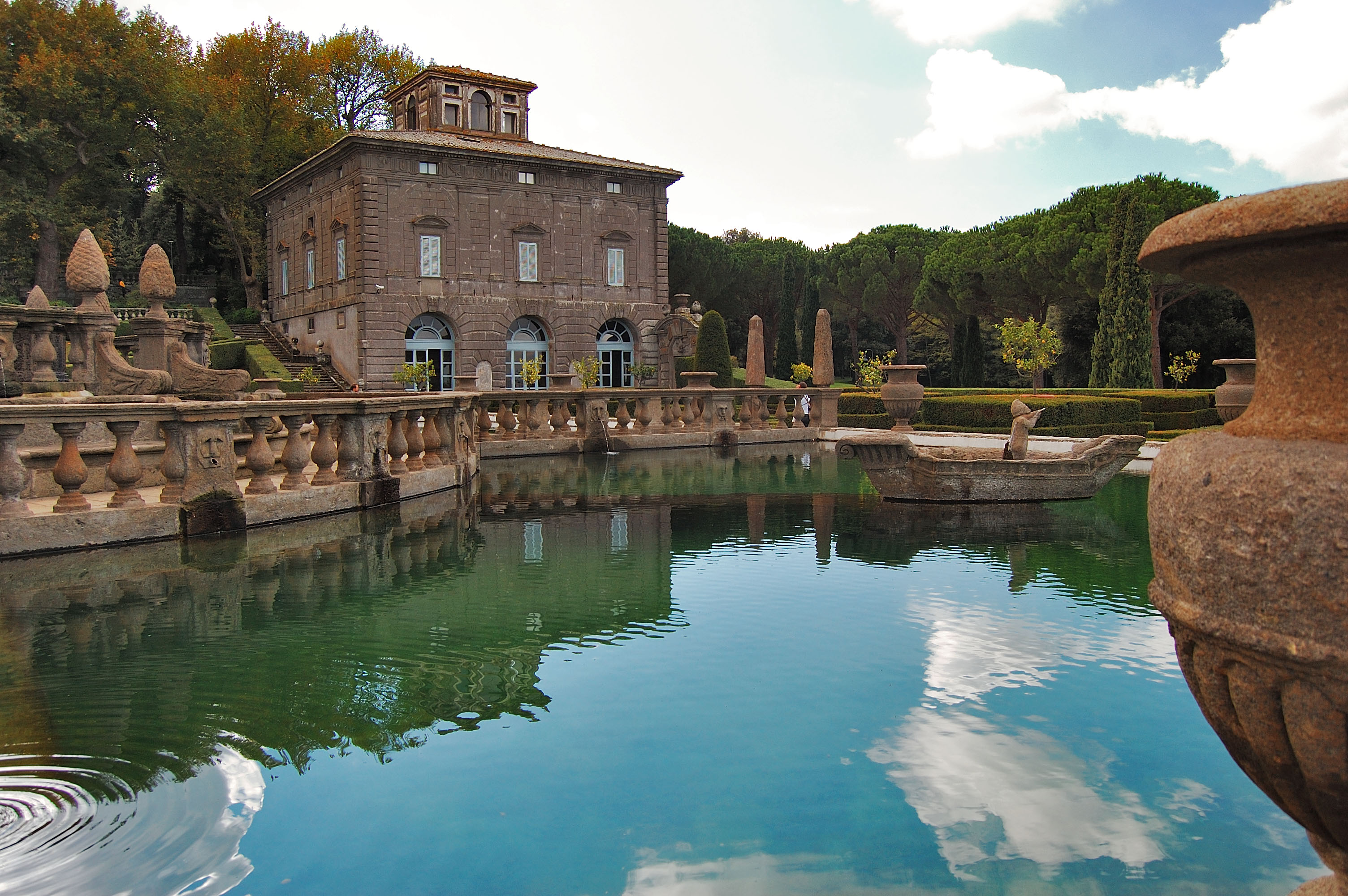
Basin and one of the casini

The Villa, a property of the Republic of Italy, since December 2014, is run by the Polo Museale del Lazio.

== Architectural design ==
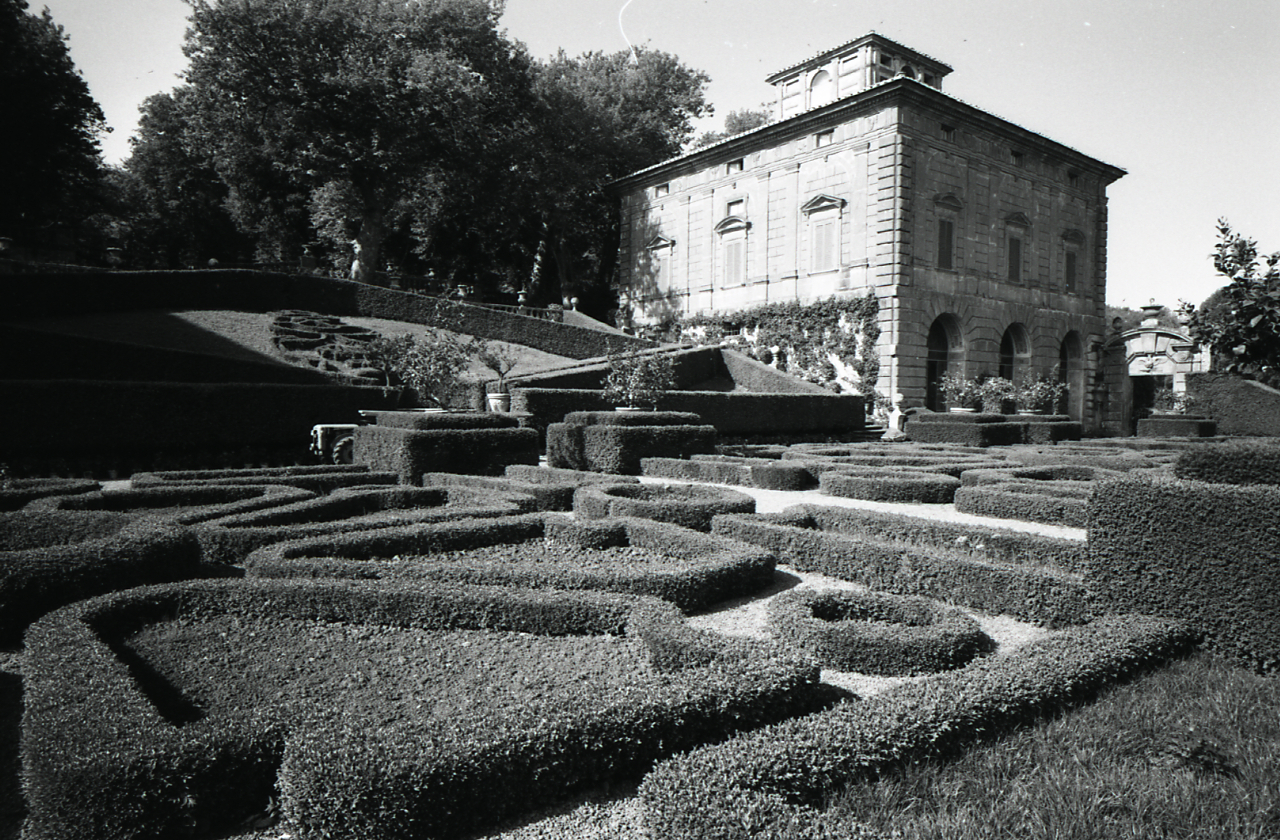
The villa seen from the garden in a photo by Paolo Monti, 1966

The Villa Lante is formed by two casini (houses), nearly identical but built by different owners in a period separated by 30 years. Each square building has a ground floor of rusticated arcades or loggias which support a piano nobile above. Each facade on this floor has just three windows, alternating round or pointed pediments. Each window is divided by pilasters in pairs. An upper floor is merely hinted at by small rectangular, mezzanine type, windows above those of the piano nobile. Each casino is then crowned by a lantern in the summit of the pantiled roof. These elaborate square lanterns too have pilasters, and windows both real and blind.

Each of these casini, in their severe Mannerist style, was built by a different unrelated owner. Villa Lante was first commissioned by Cardinal Gianfrancesco Gambara who gives his surname to the first casino.

It appears that work commenced in the late 1560s on the right-hand (as one enters) casino. The area selected for the development was an existing walled hunting ground, known as barco. It is thought that Gambara commissioned Vignola to design the project (the villa is only attributed to Vignola), and begin the work and the design of the gardens for which the villa was to become famous. The first casino and upper garden were quickly completed, but work was then suspended for the remainder of Gambara's lifetime.

Gambara died in 1587 and was succeeded as Apostolic Administrator of Viterbo by the 17-year-old nephew of Pope Sixtus V, Cardinal Alessandro Peretti di Montalto. It was this mere youth who completed the project at Bagnaia and built the second casino. The two casini differ most in their frescoes: frescoes of landscapes in the Gambara and in the Montalto frescoes by a later artist in a more classical style. In the Gambara Casino the vaulted frescoed loggias are a riot of colour highlighting the architectural detail, while in the Montalto Casino the principal reception room is a combination of fresco and plaster sculpture, almost trompe-l'œil.

== Garden design ==
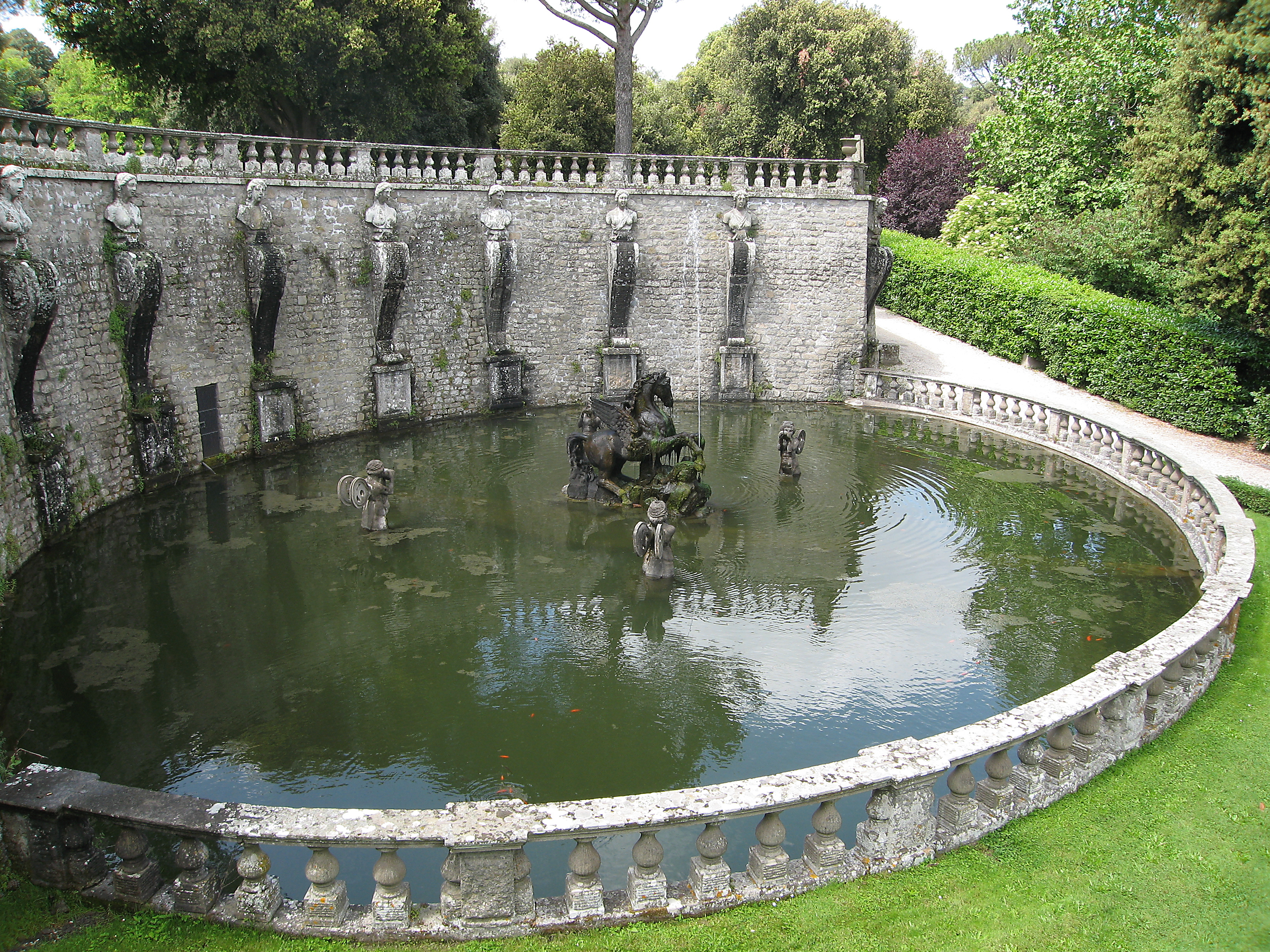
Pegasus fountain at Villa Lante

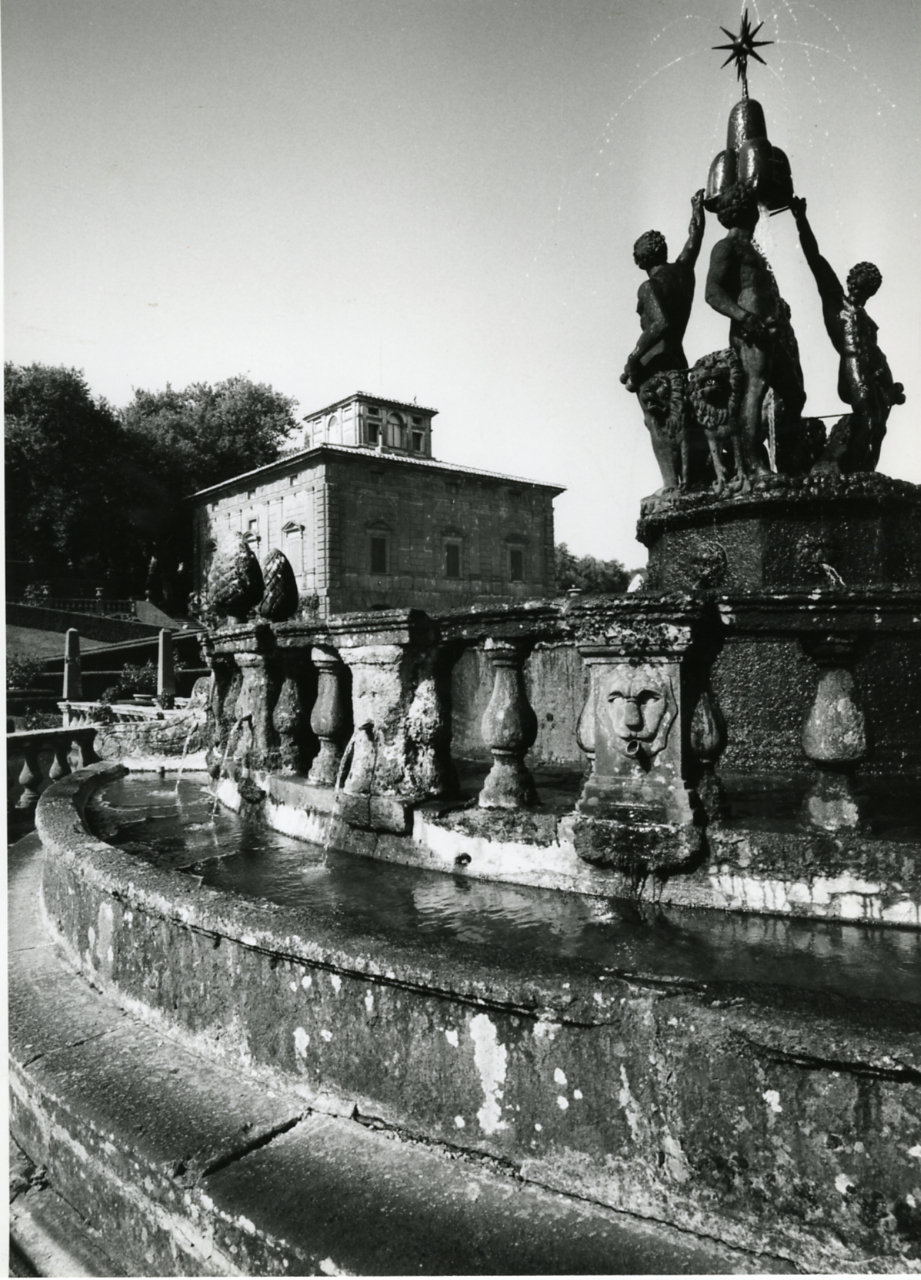
The Fountain of the Four Moors with the villa in the background. Photo by Paolo Monti, 1965.

The gardens of the Villa Lante feature cascades, fountains and dripping grottoes. The visual and harmonious choreography of water and the mechanical perfection of its flow was only achieved after Tommaso Ghinucci, a hydraulics engineer and architect from Siena, was called in; it is thought that his role was to oversee the hydraulics and building work. Although the renowned antiquarian and architect Pirro Ligorio was also consulted, it seems likely that the success of the water features is due to Ghinucci's expertise which ensured that water flows through the gardens to this day.

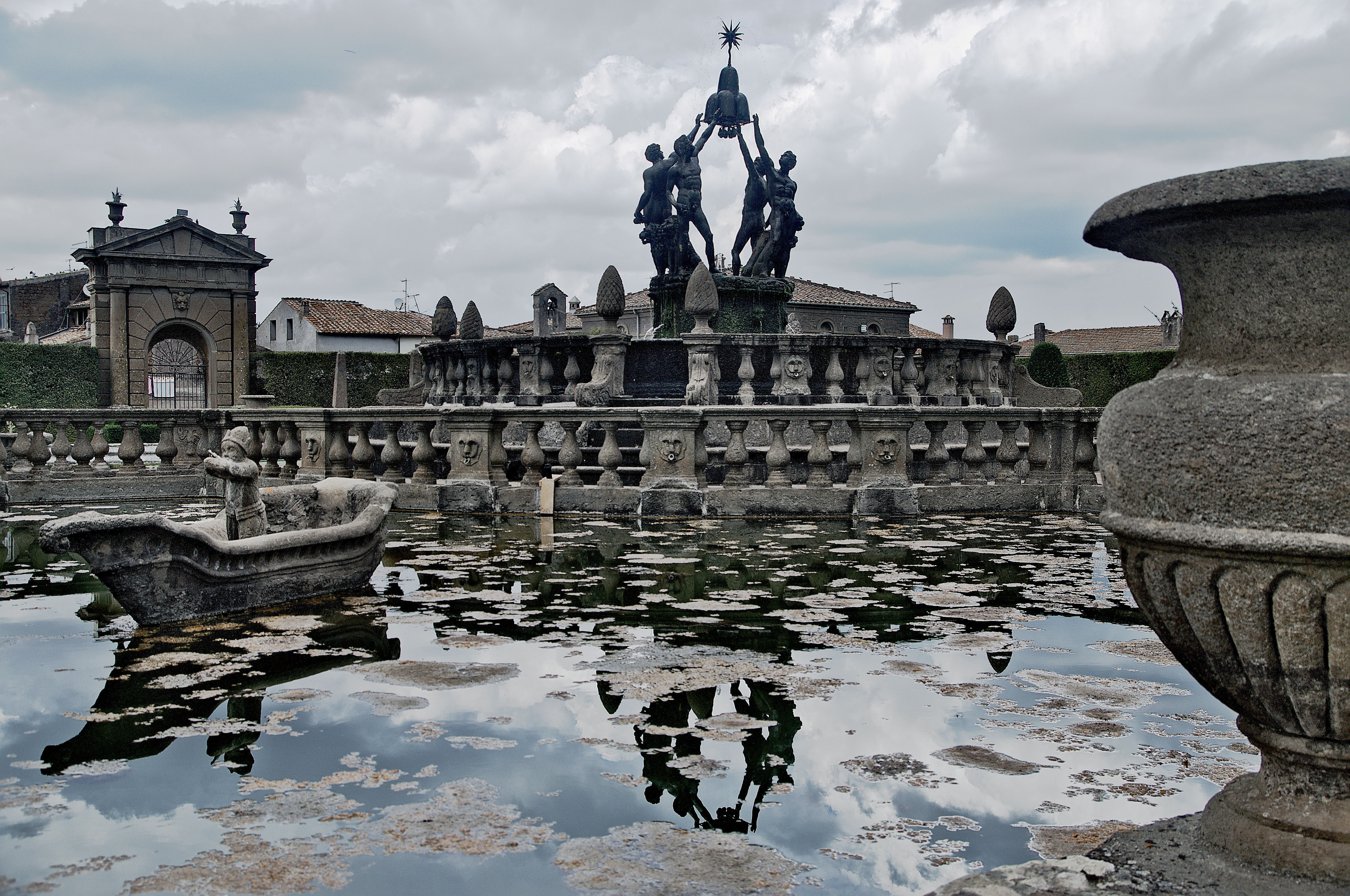
Fontana dei Mori by Giambologna

The Quadrato is a perfectly square parterre. The twin casini stand on one side, on the remaining three sides the garden is enclosed by high box hedges. In the centre, low box is sculpted and formed into decorative patterns around small fountains and sculptures. The main feature of this parterre is the complex fountain at its centre, formed of four basins, separated by parapeted walks, the parapets decorated with stone pineapples and urns that intersect the water. At the heart of the complex, a centre basin contains the "Fontana dei Mori" by Giambologna: four life-sized moors stand square around two lions; they hold high the heraldic mountain surmounted by the star shaped fountain jet, the Montalto coat of arms. This is the focal point of this unusual composition of Casini and parterre.

In the first of the ascending terraces, lodged between two stone staircases, is the Fontana dei Lumini ("Fountain of the Lamps"), a circular tiered fountain; on the ledge of each tier, smaller fountains, imitating Roman oil lamps, spout small jets of water which in the sunlight appear to blaze like lamp flames. Camellias, and other ericaceous flowering shrubs added in the 19th century blaze in the shade of this terrace.

On the next (third) terrace is a large and long stone table, with a central channel with water flowing to keep the wine cool. At the back of this terrace, are large sculpted river gods flanking a fountain. Directly above and supplying the water for the fountain is the catena d'acqua or chain of water, a water feature (gioco d'acqua) that can be seen in other 16th-century gardens (such as the Villa Farnese and Villa d'Este); this rill of small basins allows the water to ripple down to arrive at the fountain between the sculpted crayfish claws, a reference to Cardinal Gambero's heraldic device. In the meantime, stairs flanking the catena d'acqua lead up to the next terrace.

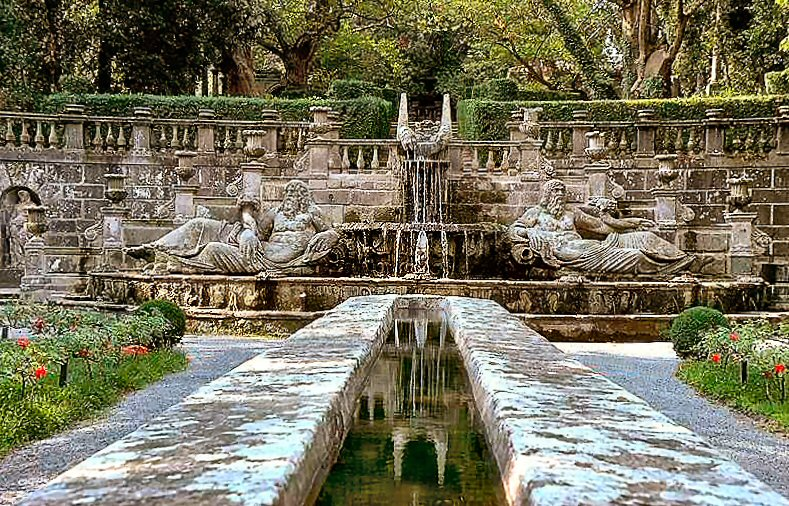
Gardens of the Villa Lante

On the next upper terrace are yet further fountains and grottos and two small casini called the Houses of the Muses, the sides of which frame the large Fountain of the Deluge that terminates the main axis of the garden. A roughened texture has been given to the sides of these small buildings to harmonise with the natural rough rock of the Fountain, and water conduits set in their eaves (and operated by a remote switch) project jets of water to complete a visual ensemble known as the 'theatre of the waters'. The main facades of these small casini, like their grander relations on the lower terrace, feature Serliana loggias articulated by Ionic columns, suggesting they might have been designed by Vignola. They bear the name of Cardinal Gambara engraved on the cornices. One casino gives access to a small secret garden, a garden of hedges and topiary, with a line of columns creating an air of an almost melancholic nature.

A perspective plan of 1609 shows a wooded area of walks and vistas to obelisks, plus a maze which has since disappeared.

== Twentieth century ==
Following the demise of Lante's last cardinal owner in 1656, the villa passed to the family of Duke Ippolito Lante, in whose family it remained for many generations. In the 19th century the family, revived by an American heiress Duchess, (a daughter of Thomas Davies of New York) still lived at Lante in some style: the Gambara Casino was lived in by the ducal family and the Montalto was reserved for their guests.

In 1944 the gardens and casini were heavily damaged by Allied bombing after the fall of Rome. In the late 20th century the Villa was acquired by Dr. Angelo Cantoni, who completed a long program of restoration. It is now part of the Grandi Giardini Italiani.

== Notes ==
=== Cited literature ===
- Aben, Rob; de Wit, Saskia (1999). The Enclosed Garden. Rotterdam: 010 Publishers. ISBN 9064503494.
- Coffin, David (1979). The Villa in the Life of Renaissance Rome. Princeton: Princeton University Press. ISBN 0691039429.
- Sitwell, Sacheverell (1961). Great Houses of Europe. London: George Weidenfeld and Nicolson Ltd. ISBN 0-600-33843-6.
- Thacker, Christopher (1985). The History of Gardens. Berkeley and Los Angeles: University of California Press. ISBN 0520056299.
