= Bagnaia, Viterbo =

Bagnaia
- Frazione
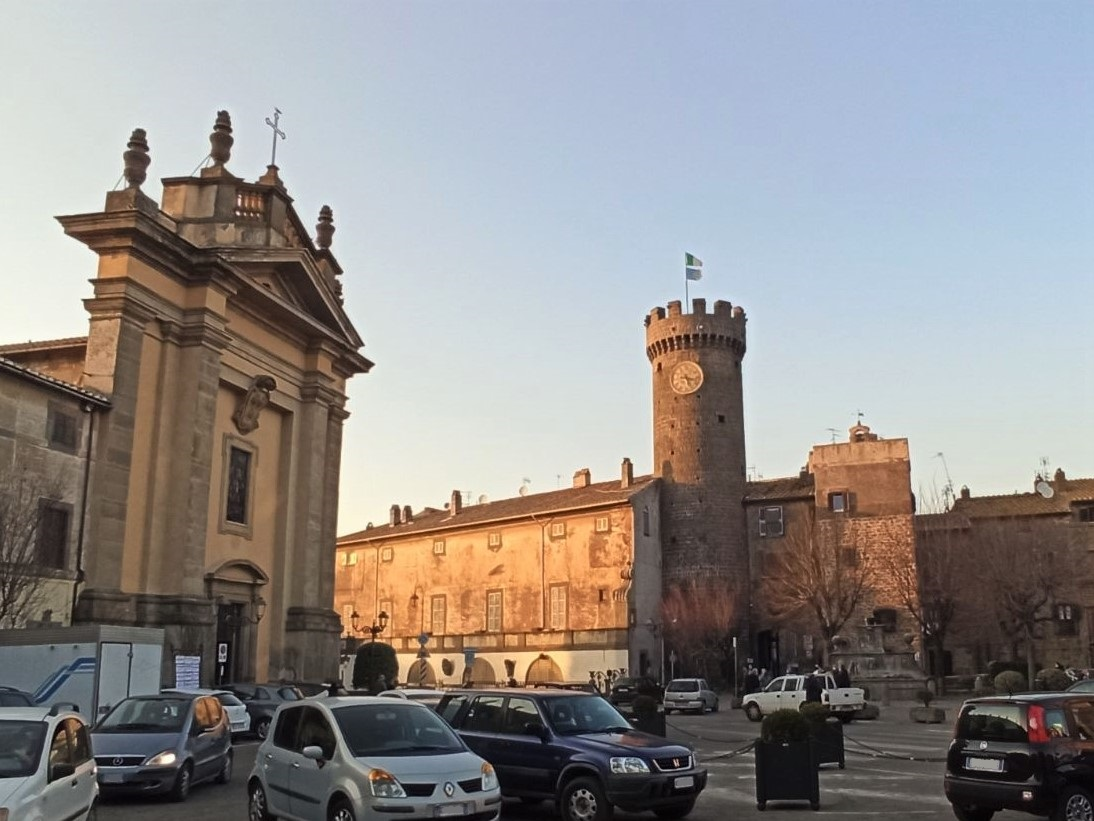
- Piazza XX Settembre in Bagnaia

- Location of Bagnaia in Italy
- Coordinates: 42°25′41″N 12°9′18″E
- Country: Italy
- Region: Lazio
- Province: Viterbo (VT)
- Comune: Viterbo
- Elevation: 441 m (1,447 ft)

Population (2017)
  - Total: 5,500
- Time zone: UTC+1 (CET)
  - Summer (DST): UTC+2 (CEST)

Bagnaia is a village in Lazio, central Italy, administratively a frazione of the comune of Viterbo, province of Viterbo.

Former municipality, it was annexed to the comune of Viterbo in 1928. Bagnaia is about 7 km from Viterbo and 100 km from Rome.

The "Fuoco di Sant Antonio" is a large bonfire erected in the town center and, with much merriment, lit on the evening of each 16th of January in honor of the St Anthony.

== Main sights ==
- San Giovanni Battista, parish church built in the late 16th century, it was entirely restructured in 1753 by cardinal Federico Marcello Lante
- Sant'Antonio Abate
- Castle of Bagnaia
- Villa Lante, built between 1566 and 1588 and commissioned by cardinal Giovanni Francesco Gambara
