= Orto Botanico dell'Università di Catania =

Botanical garden in Sicily, Italy

Coordinates: 37.5157°N 15.0836°E

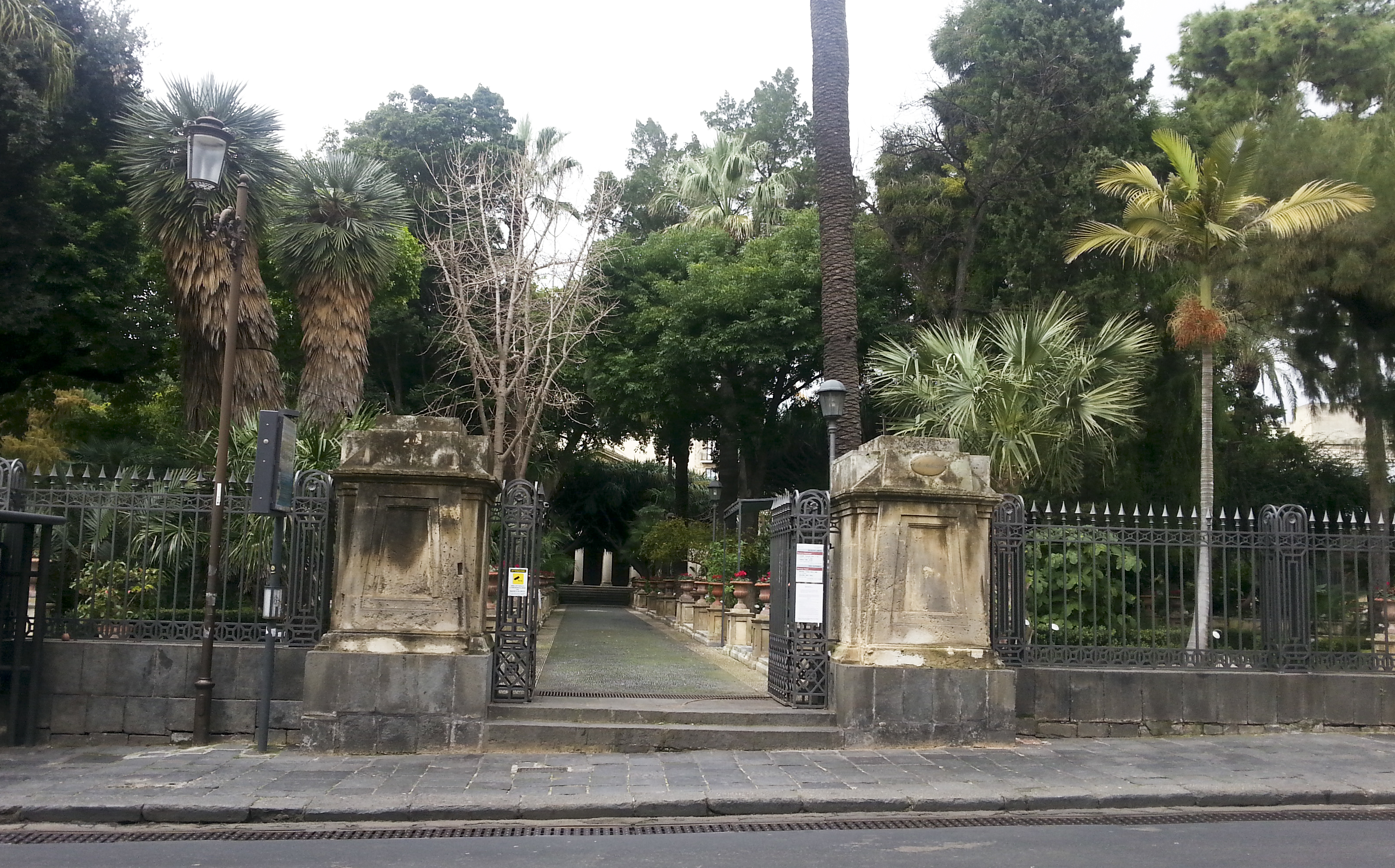
Main entrance

The Orto Botanico dell'Università di Catania (16,000 m^{2}), also known as the Hortus Botanicus Catinensis, is a botanical garden in Catania, Sicily, southern Italy. It is operated by the University of Catania botany department. This institution is a member of BGCI, with international identification code CAT.

== History ==
Realization of a garden was first attempted in 1847 with a purchase of land on the city outskirts, but the revolutions of 1848 rapidly led to its dispersion. In 1858 the garden was established by founder and director, Benedictine Monk and botanist Francis Roccaforte Tornabene (1813–1897), with first plantings in 1862 of specimens obtained from other botanical gardens in Sweden, France, Naples, and Palermo. It was enlarged in 1865 with a new area dedicated to cultivation of indigenous Sicilian species, and in the early 1900s further enhanced by creation of the Giardino Botanico "Nuova Gussonea" on Mount Etna for cultivation of native mountain plants. The main garden was damaged during World War II, and its great Tepidario greenhouse demolished in 1958, but in subsequent years it has been renewed.

== Overview ==
Today the garden is divided into two main sections: the Hortus Generalis (13,000 m^{2}) which collects mainly exotic plants, and the Hortus Siculus (3000 m^{2}) which cultivates Sicilian species. The Hortus Generalis is divided into squares, set off by limestone steps, with two small greenhouses for succulents, a tropical greenhouse used primarily for reproduction of palms by seed and for cultivation of exotic plants, and three circular tanks for aquatic plants. The Hortus Siculus is divided into narrow rectangular flower beds bordered with lava stone, containing plants arranged by family. The garden also contains a handsome departmental building in neoclassical style.

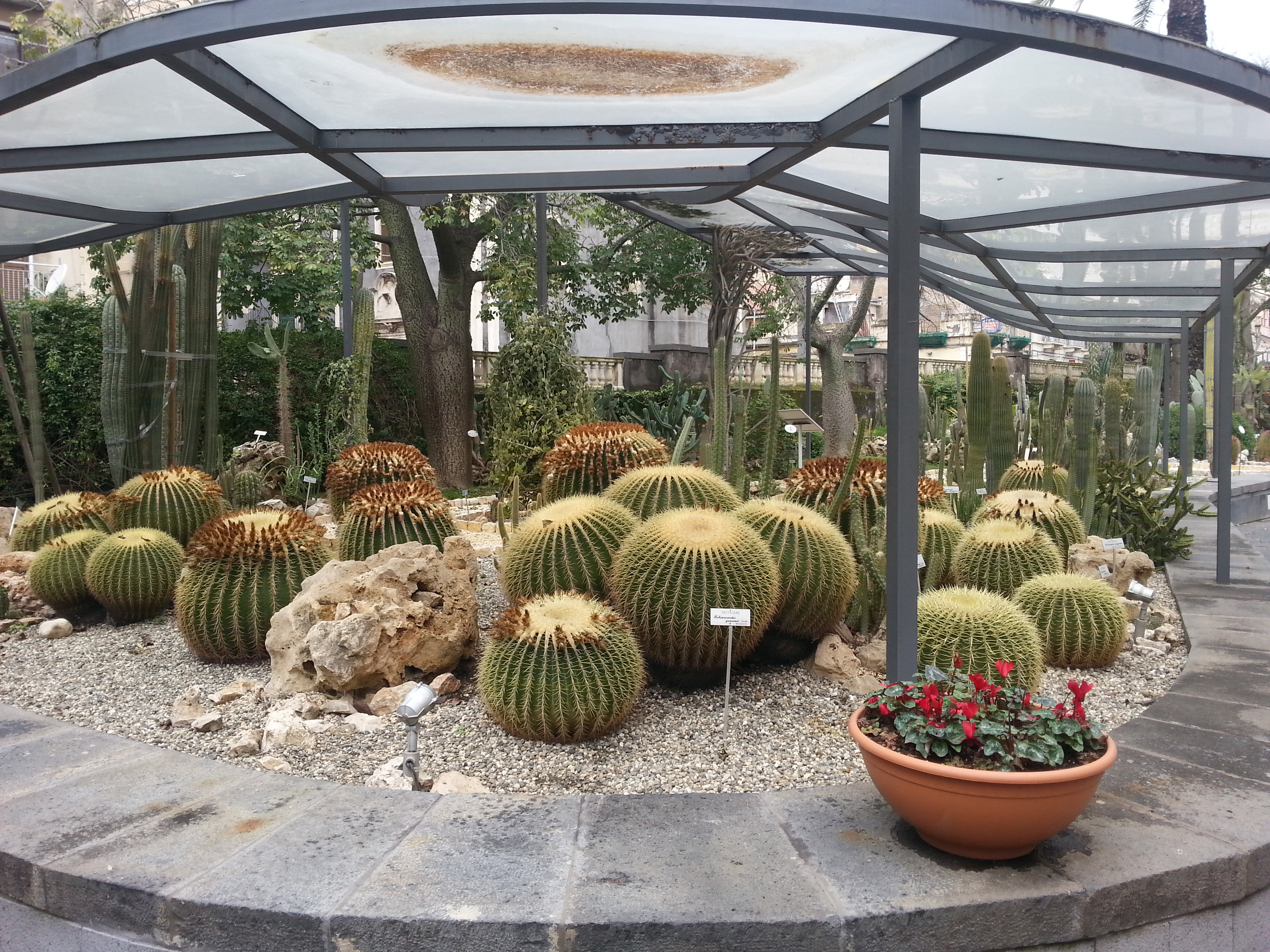
Succulent plants collection

The garden's main collections are as follows:

- Succulent plants - thousands of specimens, most grown outdoors. The collection was first created by Tornabene, and in 1963 enlarged by 4,000 new specimens. Today it contains about 2,000 species, mainly Cactaceae, Euphorbiaceae, and Aizoaceae. Of particular interest are its Astrophytum capricorne, Blossfeldia liliputana, Cereus, Echinocactus grusonii, Leuchtenbergia principis, Lophophora williamsii, Mammillaria herrerae, Mammillaria schiedeana, Mammillaria theresae, Melocatus jansenianus, Roseocactus fissuratus, and Toumeya papyracantha, as well as Euphorbia abyssinica, Euphorbia candelabrum, Euphorbia trigona, Euphorbia coerulescens, Euphorbia resinifera, and Caralluma europaea, Crassula brevifolia, Crassula falcata, and Stapelia.
- Palms - about fifty species, representing Arecastrum, Arykuryroba, Butia, Chamaedorea, Chamaerops, Erithea, Howea, Livistona, Phoenix, Sabal, Trithrinax, Trachycarpus, Washingtonia, etc., with notable specimens of Arecastrum romanzoffianum, Butia eriospatha, Brahea dulcis, Dypsis onilahensis, Jubaea chilensis, Medemia argun, Rhopalostylis sapida, Pritchardia hillebrandii, Sabal acauli, Trithrinax campestris, Trithrinax brasiliensis, Wallichia densiflora, and Washingtonia robusta.
- Sicilian plants - including Abies nebrodensis, Anthemis ismelia, Brassica, Celtis aetnensis, Centaurea tauromenitana, Cremnophyton lanfrancoi, Darniella melitensis, Cheirolophus crassifolius, Salix gussonei, Scilla cupani, Scilla dimartinoi, Scilla sicula, Senecio ambiguus, and Zelkova sicula.
- Trees and shrubs - including Bupleurum fruticosum, Ceratonia siliqua, Chamaerops humilis, Cistus creticus, Dracaena draco, Erica multiflora, Fontanesia phillyreoides, Myrtus communis, Quercus ilex, Phillyrea angustifolia, Pinus pinea, Pistacia lentiscus, Populus alba, Ulmus canescens, and Vitex agnus-castus.
- Exotic species - including Agathis australis, Agave americana, Ceratozamia mexicana, Eriobotrya japonica, Macrozamia moorei, Morus alba, and Prunus armeniaca.

== See also ==
- List of botanical gardens in Italy
- iPhone App
