= Candelabra tree =

Candelabra tree can refer to:

- Araucaria angustifolia, native to Brazil
- Several species of Euphorbia, including:
  - Euphorbia ammak, native to Arabia and Yemen
  - Euphorbia candelabrum, native to eastern Africa
  - Euphorbia cooperi, Transvaal candelabra tree
  - Euphorbia halipedicola, native to eastern Africa
  - Euphorbia ingens, native to southern Africa
  - Euphorbia lactea, native to tropical Asia
- Senna didymobotrya, native to Africa
- Various large individual Sequoiadendron giganteum trees, including one at Packsaddle Grove, California

See also:

- Pandanus candelabrum, also known as the chandelier tree, native to tropical Africa
