= Living Desert Zoo and Gardens =

Botanical garden and zoo in Riverside County, California

The Living Desert Zoo and Gardens
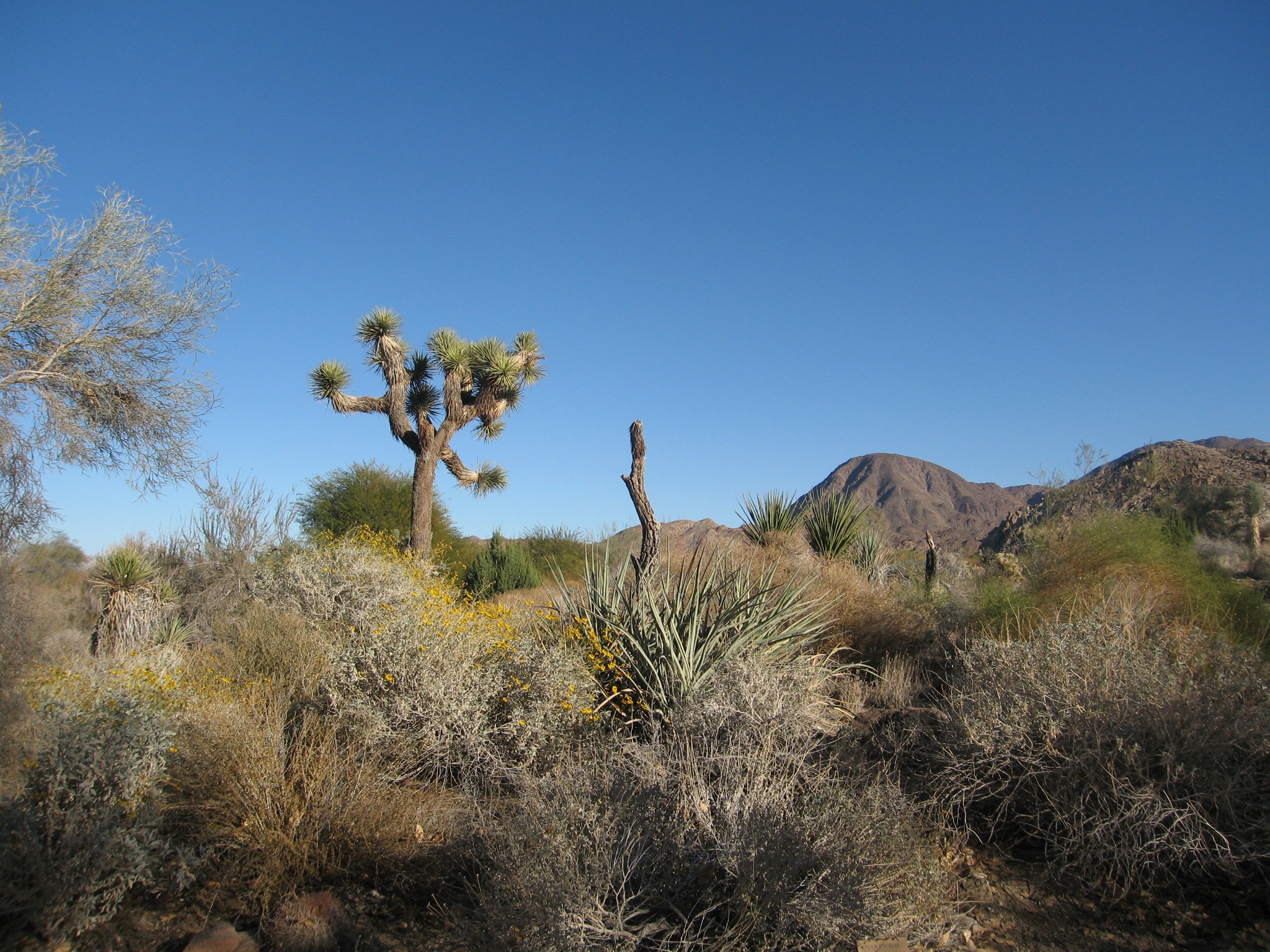
- The gardens
- Interactive map of The Living Desert Zoo and Gardens
- 33°41′45″N 116°22′13″W
- Date opened: March 9, 1970
- Location: Palm Desert, California, United States and Indian Wells, California, United States
- Land area: 1,800 acres (730 ha) (1,720 acres (700 ha) left in natural state)
- No. of animals: 500
- No. of species: 150
- Annual visitors: 500,000
- Memberships: AZA, WAZA
- Major exhibits: Wilds of North America, African Safari, Australian Adventures
- Website: www.livingdesert.org

The Living Desert Zoo and Gardens, formerly the Living Desert Museum, is a non-profit zoo and desert botanical garden in Palm Desert, in the Colorado Desert, in California in the United States. It is set on 1,200 acres of land, with 80 developed as zoo and gardens, and is home to over 500 animals representing over 150 species and receives over 500,000 visitors annually.

The zoo has been a member of the Association of Zoos and Aquariums since 1983, and is a member of the World Association of Zoos and Aquariums (WAZA). It has participated in species reintroduction programs including the peninsular bighorn sheep to the local mountains and returning Arabian oryx to Oman.

== History ==
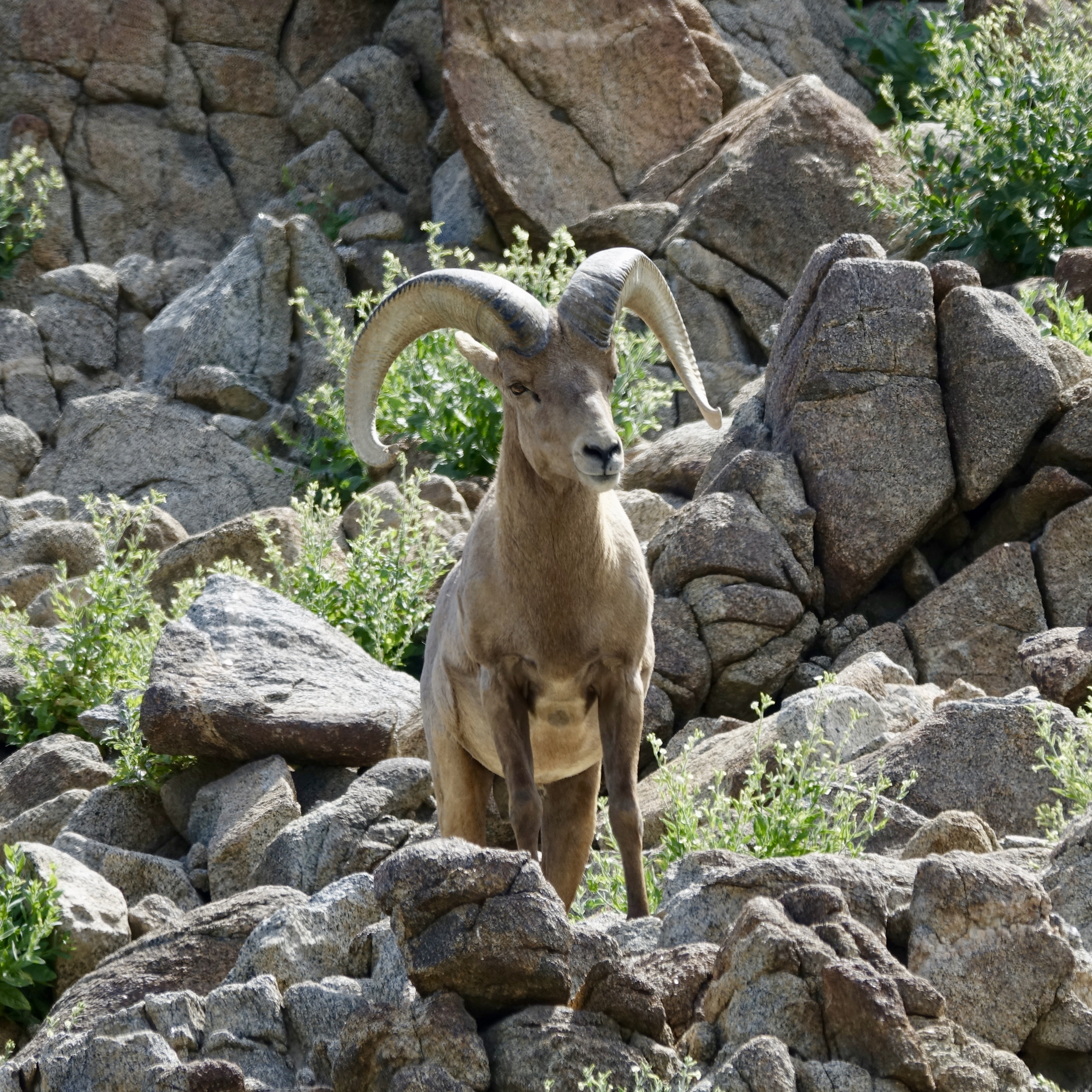
Bighorn sheep in one of the exhibits.

The gardens of the Low Desert – Colorado Desert were established in 1970 as a 360-acre (150 ha) wilderness preserve by several trustees of the Palm Springs Desert Museum. By 1974, the gardens housed a kit fox, tortoises, lizards, and two bighorn sheep. In 1974–75 the Mojave Garden was built, a replica of the High Desert – Mojave Desert. Additional facilities have gradually been constructed, including greenhouses, model trains, and designed landscape gardens. New animal introductions include rhim gazelles (1981); mountain lions, bobcats and badgers (1993); meerkats; cheetahs and warthogs (1995); striped hyenas (1998); giraffes and ostriches (2002). The 'Amphibians on the Edge' exhibit shows a variety of different species of frogs, toads, and salamanders (2007). The Endangered Species Carousel was constructed in fall 2009, and the Peninsular Pronghorn Exhibit was constructed in fall 2010. The Monarch of the Desert exhibit on the North America Trail holds jaguars. In 2020, Australian Adventures opened as a habitat for Bennett's Wallaby, Yellow-footed rock wallaby, kookaburra and more. The Living Desert opened the Rhino Savanna in Fall 2021. The Living Desert is one of six accredited (AZA) private zoos in the United States and operates as a non-profit.

In 2023, the Animal Care Department voted to unionize.

== Animal habitats ==
The Living Desert Zoo and Gardens is divided by continent into three sections.

African Safari

Animals include:

- Abyssinian ground hornbill
- Arabian oryx (native to Middle East)
- African wild dog
- South African cheetah
- Fennec fox
- Grévy's zebra
- Giraffe
- Grey crowned crane
- Helmeted guineafowl
- Kori bustard
- Ostrich
- Greater kudu
- Addra gazelle
- Cuvier's gazelle
- Slender-horned gazelle
- Addax
- Dromedary camel
- Amur leopard (native to Siberian Russia)
- Striped hyena
- Bat-eared fox
- Serval
- Cape porcupine
- Common warthog
- Leopard tortoise
- Eastern black rhinoceros
- Springbok
- Waterbuck
- Klipspringer
- Cape vulture
- Great white pelican
- Pink-backed pelican
- Banded mongoose
- Common dwarf mongoose
- Naked mole-rat

Wilds of North America

Animals include:

- Bald eagle
- Desert bighorn sheep
- American badger
- Bobcat
- Caracal (native to Africa and Asia)
- Channel Islands gray fox
- Kit fox
- Swift fox
- Ringtail
- Chacoan peccary
- Coyote
- Golden eagle
- Jaguar
- Mountain lion
- Mexican wolf
- Peninsular pronghorn
- White-nosed coati
- Common chuckwalla
- Desert tortoise

Australian Adventures

Australian Adventures is a walk-through habitat which includes an aviary with parakeets, reptiles and wallabies. Other animals include:

- Bennett's wallaby
- Emu
- Woylie (or brush-tailed bettong)
- Budgerigar
- Short-beaked echidna
- Blue-tongued skink
- Central bearded dragon
- Centralian carpet python
- Frill-necked lizard
- Olive python
- Laughing kookaburra
- Tawny frogmouth
- Yellow-footed rock-wallaby

== Gardens and plant habitats ==
- The North American desert gardens include re-creations of a variety of desert plant community ecosystems:
  - Mojave Desert – Joshua tree (Yucca brevifolia) habitat and Eastern Mojave Cima volcanic field habitat.
  - Chihuahuan Desert – Rio Grande-Big Bend (New Mexico-Texas) and northern Mexican Plateau (Mexico) habitats.
  - Sonoran Desert – Sonora, Mexico Madrean foothills habitat, Yuma Desert–southwest Arizona habitat and Vizcaíno–Baja California deserts habitat gardens.
  - Colorado Desert (Sonoran Desert sub-region) – montane desert habitat of the indigenous 2,000 to 3,000 feet (610 to 910 m) elevation landscape, the Cahuilla Ethnobotanic Garden of the locally indigenous Cahuilla people, and focused areas of the Lower Colorado River Valley and the Colorado–Sonoran Desert natural springs, ponds, and riparian habitats.
- Specialized, focus gardens include:
  - Agave Garden – more than 100 species of the genus Agave endemic to the Western Hemisphere, predominantly the United States and Mexico.
  - Aloe Garden – African and Middle Eastern garden of Aloeaceae family specimens.
  - East African Garden – large collection of native East African plants, shrubs and trees; one of the larger collections of African plants in North America.
  - Euphorbia Garden – poisonous, varied and unique African and Indian plants of the family Euphorbiaceae, such as fire-sticks (Euphorbia tirucalli), crown-of-thorns (E. milii), and candelabra trees (E. ammak and E. ingens).
  - Aviary Oasis – a replicated Coachella Valley native desert palm oasis, with endemic birds and California fan palms (Washingtonia filifera) surrounding the walk-in aviary.
  - Barrel Cactus garden – barrel (Echinocactus) and fish-hook cactus (Ferocactus) specimens.
  - Hummingbird Garden – nectar-rich perennial plants that attract pollinators and hummingbirds.
  - Johnston Cactus Garden – various special cactus specimens on display.
  - Madagascar Garden – mostly xeric plants, endemic to Madagascar, including “mockotillo” (Alluaudia procera) and the Madagascar spiny “palm” (Pachypodiums).
  - Mallow Garden – small collection of desert mallows.
  - McDonald Butterfly and Wildflower Garden – nectar (adults) and 'grazing' (larvae) plants that attract migrating butterflies, such as milkweeds (genus Asclepias) and butterfly-bush (Buddleja).
  - Mexican Columnar Cactus Garden – tall, columnar and sculptural cactus specimens, such as Mexican fencepost (Lophocereus marginatus).
  - Ocotillo Garden – nine of twelve known ocotillo species.
  - Opuntia Garden – various prickly pear (Opuntia) and cholla (Cylindropuntia) plants.
  - Palm Garden – several hundred palm (Arecaceae) trees, representing over 50 species from around the world.
  - Primitive Garden – plants dating from the Jurassic period, mainly cycads, Equisetum, and ferns.
  - Sage Garden – Salvia species of melliferous flower and used by bees as honey forage.
  - Sheep Food Garden – plants that are wild food sources for desert bighorn sheep.
  - Smoke Tree Garden – local native smoke trees (Psorothamnus spinosus) in a natural desert wash setting.
  - Sonoran Arboretum – trees from the greater Sonoran Desert region in a designed garden setting.
  - Wortz Demonstration Garden – Southwest landscape design display garden.
  - Yucca Garden – Yucca and Joshua tree species in a replicated native foliage garden.

== Gallery ==
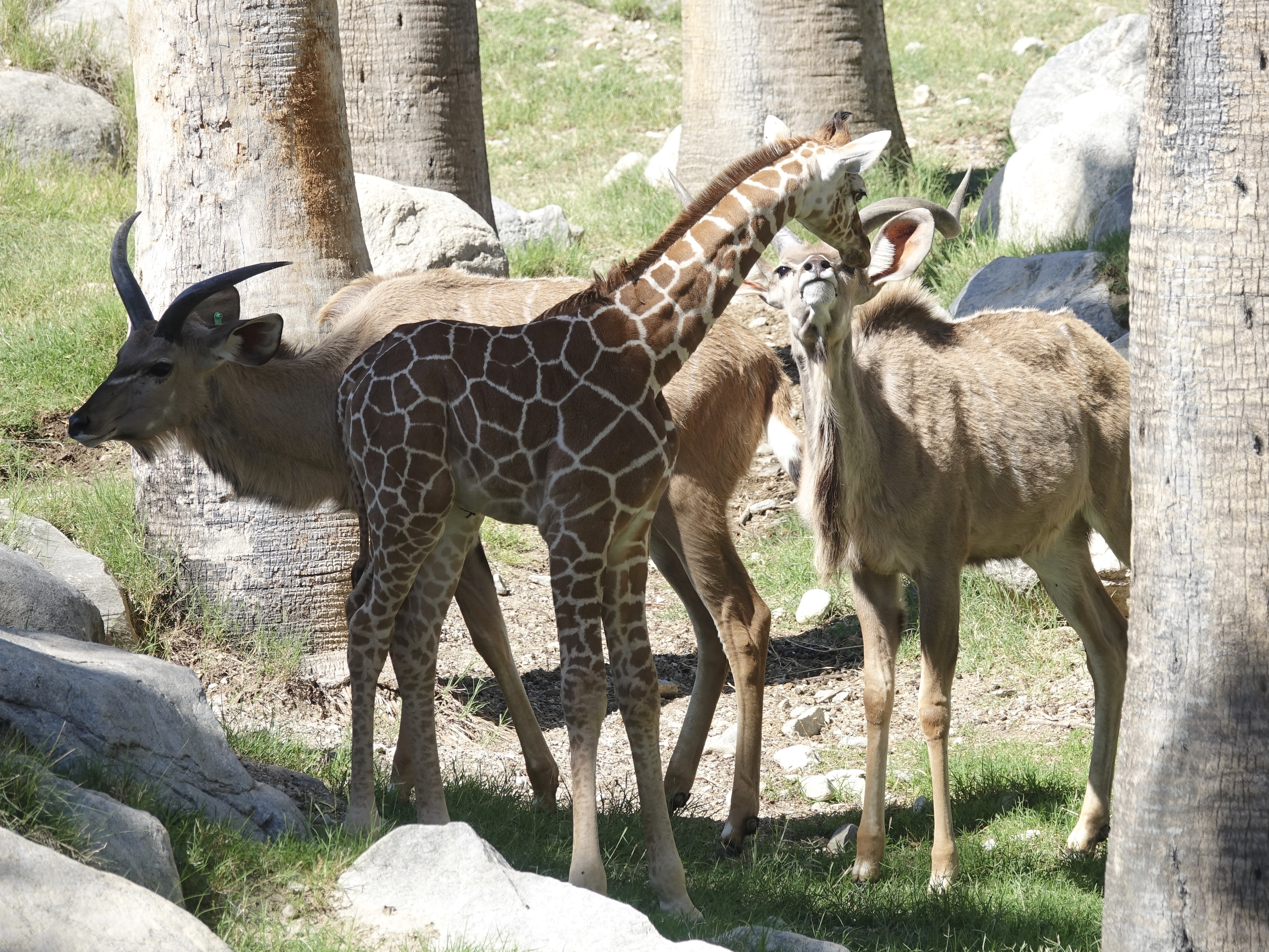

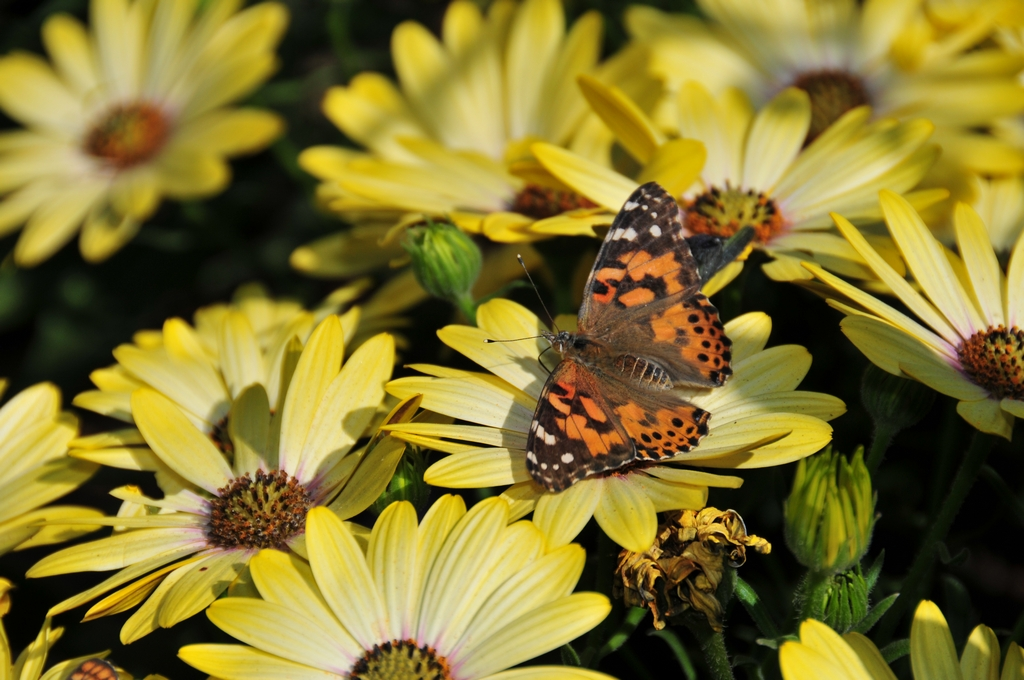

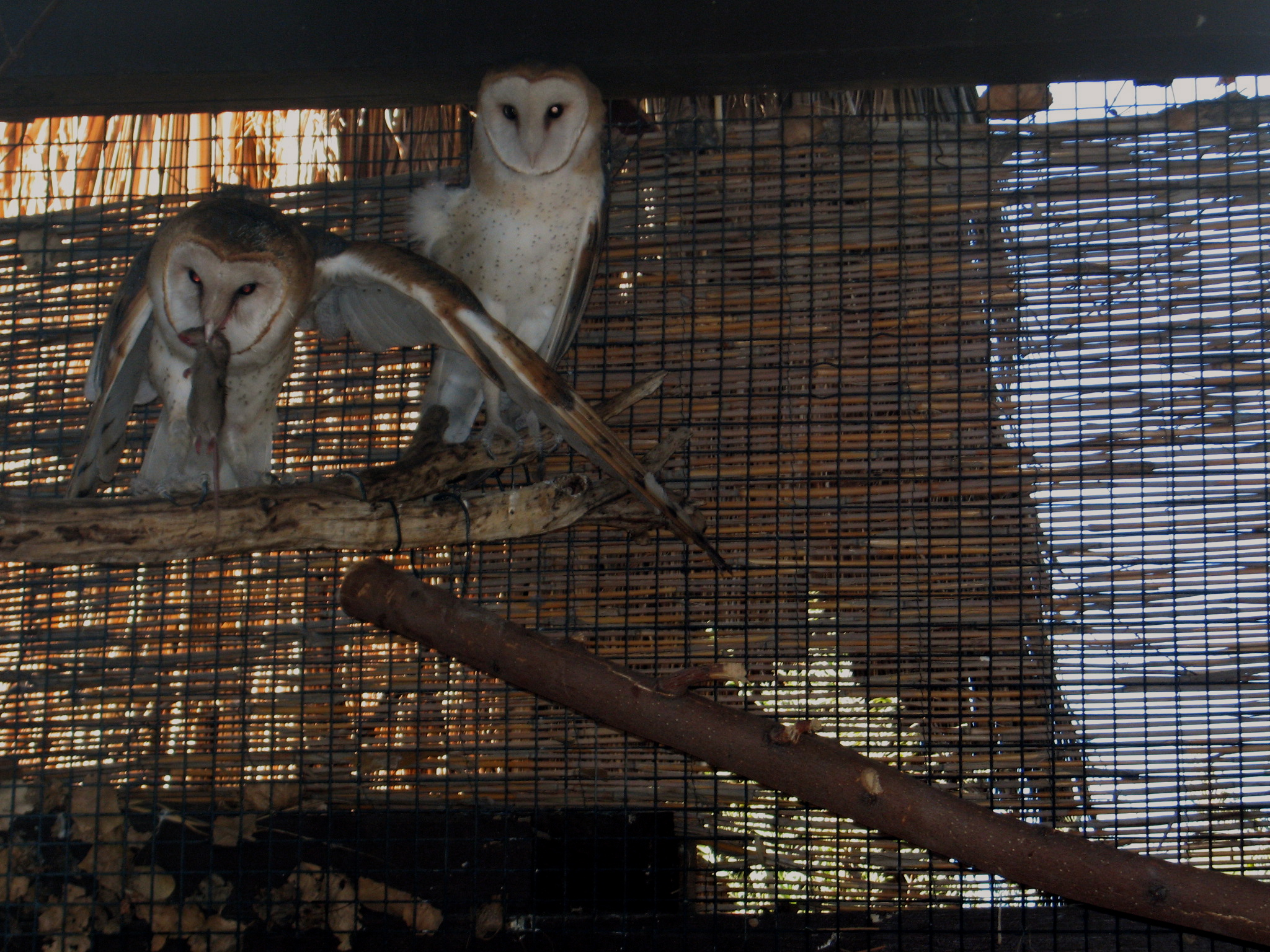

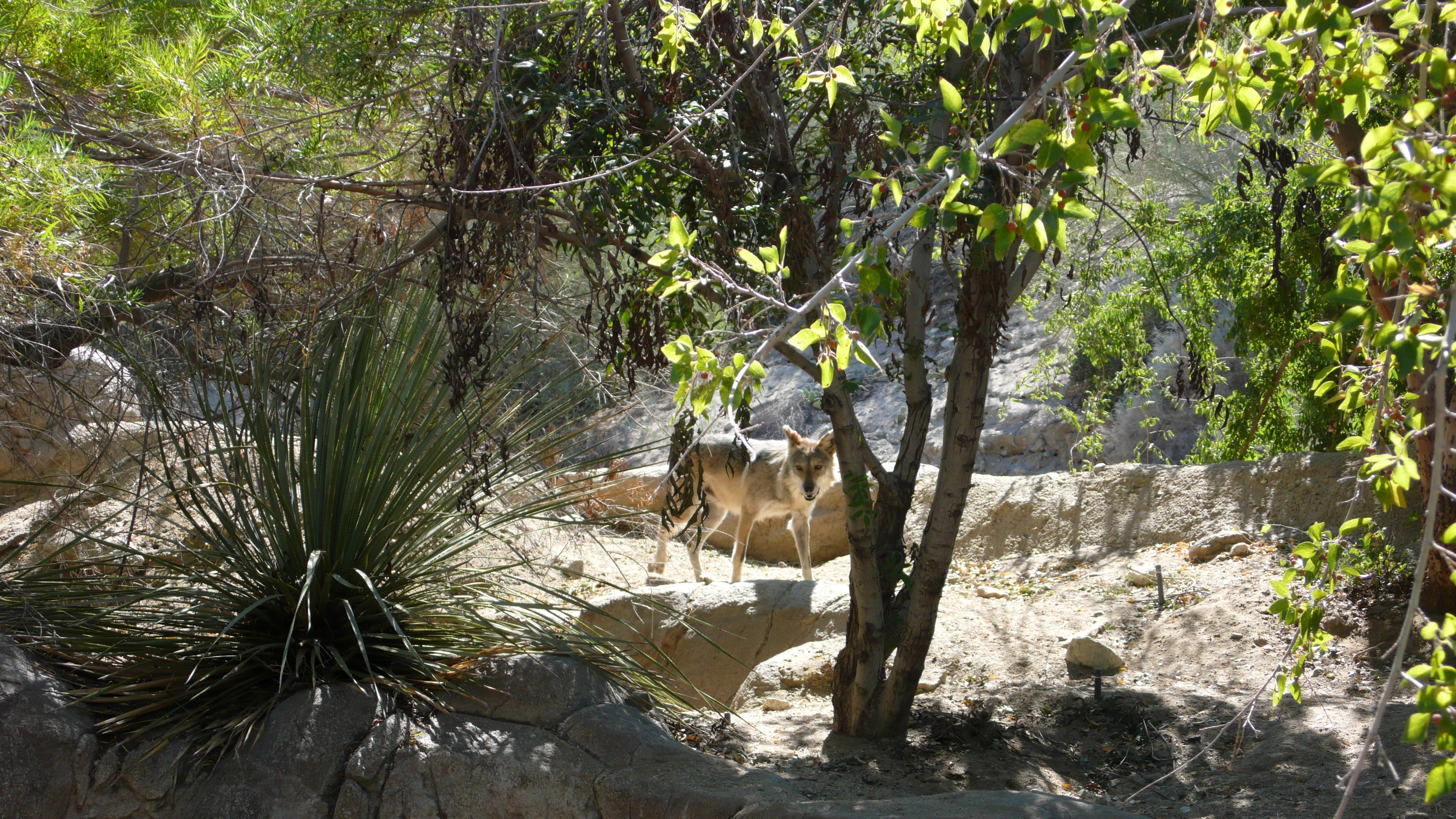

== Other attractions ==
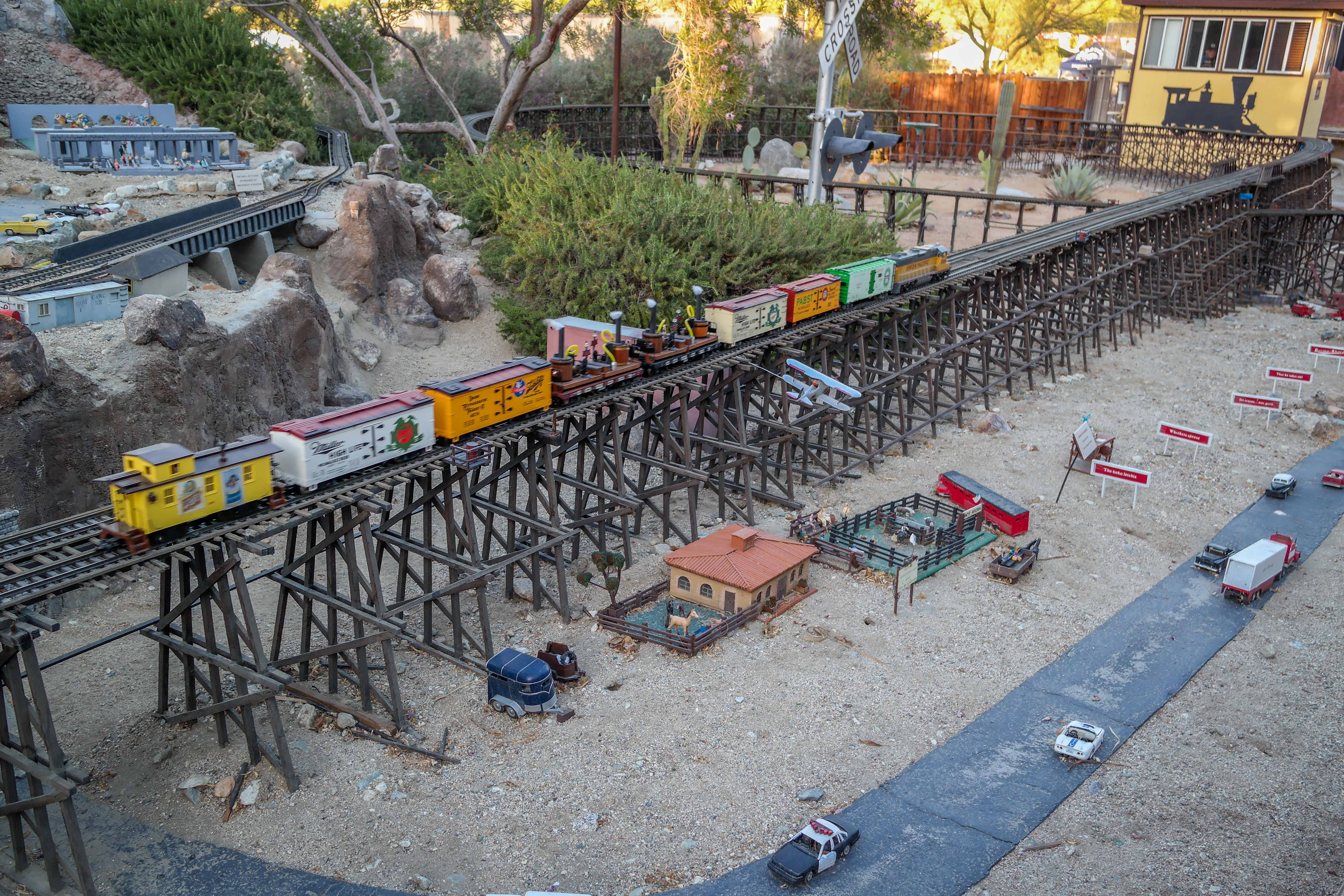

The zoo has a large LGB model railroad layout with 3,115 feet (949 m) of track. The world's longest wooden G-scale model trestle, at 201.8 ft (61.5 m), lets trains travel between the upper and lower portions of the wash in which it was built – an almost 2-foot (0.61 m) drop. The trains started in 1998 as part of the annual WildLights holiday program and ran only in the evenings. In 2000 the trains started running throughout the year and during the day and there are 18 separate train lines that can run simultaneously. The trains and track are managed by an all-volunteer team.

== See also ==
- Index: Flora of the California desert regions
- List of botanical gardens and arboretums in the United States
- Moorten Botanical Garden and Cactarium
