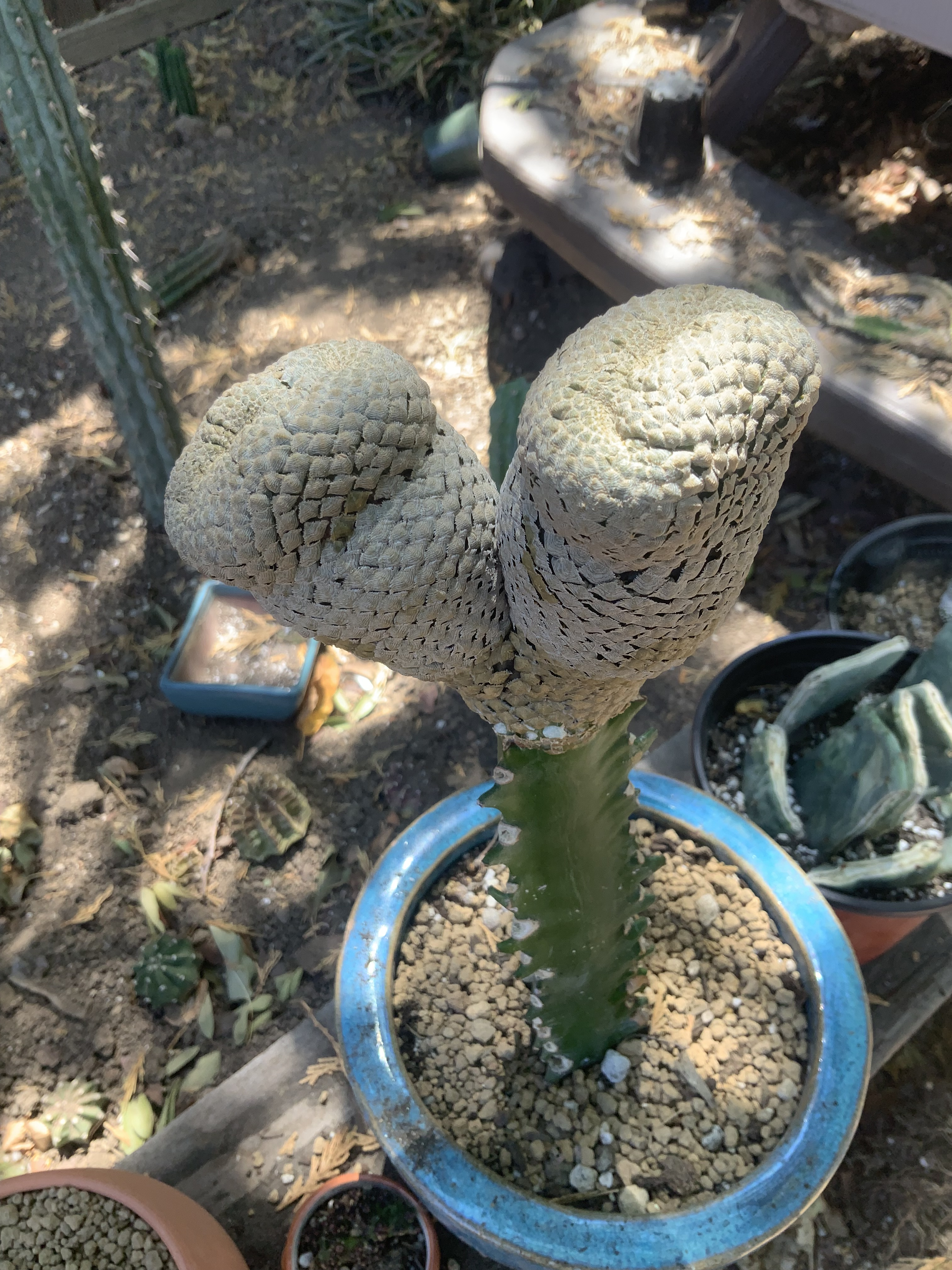

Scientific classification
- Kingdom: Plantae
- Clade: Tracheophytes
- Clade: Angiosperms
- Clade: Eudicots
- Clade: Rosids
- Order: Malpighiales
- Family: Euphorbiaceae
- Genus: Euphorbia
- Species: E. piscidermis

Binomial name
- Euphorbia piscidermis M.G.Gilbert

= Euphorbia piscidermis =

Species of spurge

Euphorbia piscidermis is a species of plant native to the succulent scrublands of Ethiopa.

== Description ==
Euphorbia piscidermis is a succulent species of Euphorbia, often growing in clusters. Stems are up to 4" wide, and are round in shape. The stems have a very unique fish skin like look to them, making them sought after to collectors. Flowers form occasionally on the stem, developing into capsule-like fruits. Euphorbia gymnocalycioides, Euphorbia turbiniformis and Euphorbia horwoodii are considered the closest relatives to Euphorbia piscidermis.

== Habitat ==
Euphorbia piscidermis is found growing in the dry scrublands of euphorbia.

== Cultivation ==
This species is difficult to cultivate on its own roots, so it is often grafted onto fast-growing Euphorbia species such as Euphorbia ingens or Euphorbia ammak.
