= Euphorbia turbiniformis =

Scientific classification
- Kingdom: Plantae
- Clade: Tracheophytes
- Clade: Angiosperms
- Clade: Eudicots
- Clade: Rosids
- Order: Malpighiales
- Family: Euphorbiaceae
- Genus: Euphorbia
- Species: E. turbiniformis

Binomial name
- Euphorbia turbiniformis Chiov.

Species of plant

Euphorbia turbiniformis is a species of Euphorbia native to the limestone cliffs of Somalia, once considered extinct.

== Description ==
Euphorbia turbiniformis is a globose succulent plant up to 4 cm in diameter. E. turbiniformis is sometimes depressed in the center, and very rare fasciating or dichotomizing. The greenish brown body, with many tessellated marks, lacks spines. The dull yellow cyathia, 2 mm in diameter, contain peduncles and cyme-branches 2-5 mm long. The roots are fiborous. Euphorbia gymnocalycioides, Euphorbia piscidermis and Euphorbia horwoodii are considered the closest relatives to Euphorbia turbiniformis.

== Ecology and habitat ==
Euphorbia turbiniformis is found on limestone cliffs 300 meters above sea level and is known to grow among woody shrubs.

== Cultivation ==
Euphorbia turbiniformis is nearly impossible to cultivate; attempts made to cultivate this species have shown this species is extremely sensitive and rots quite easily. For that reason, this species is often grafted to easier species such as Euphorbia canariensis, or Euphorbia ingens.
