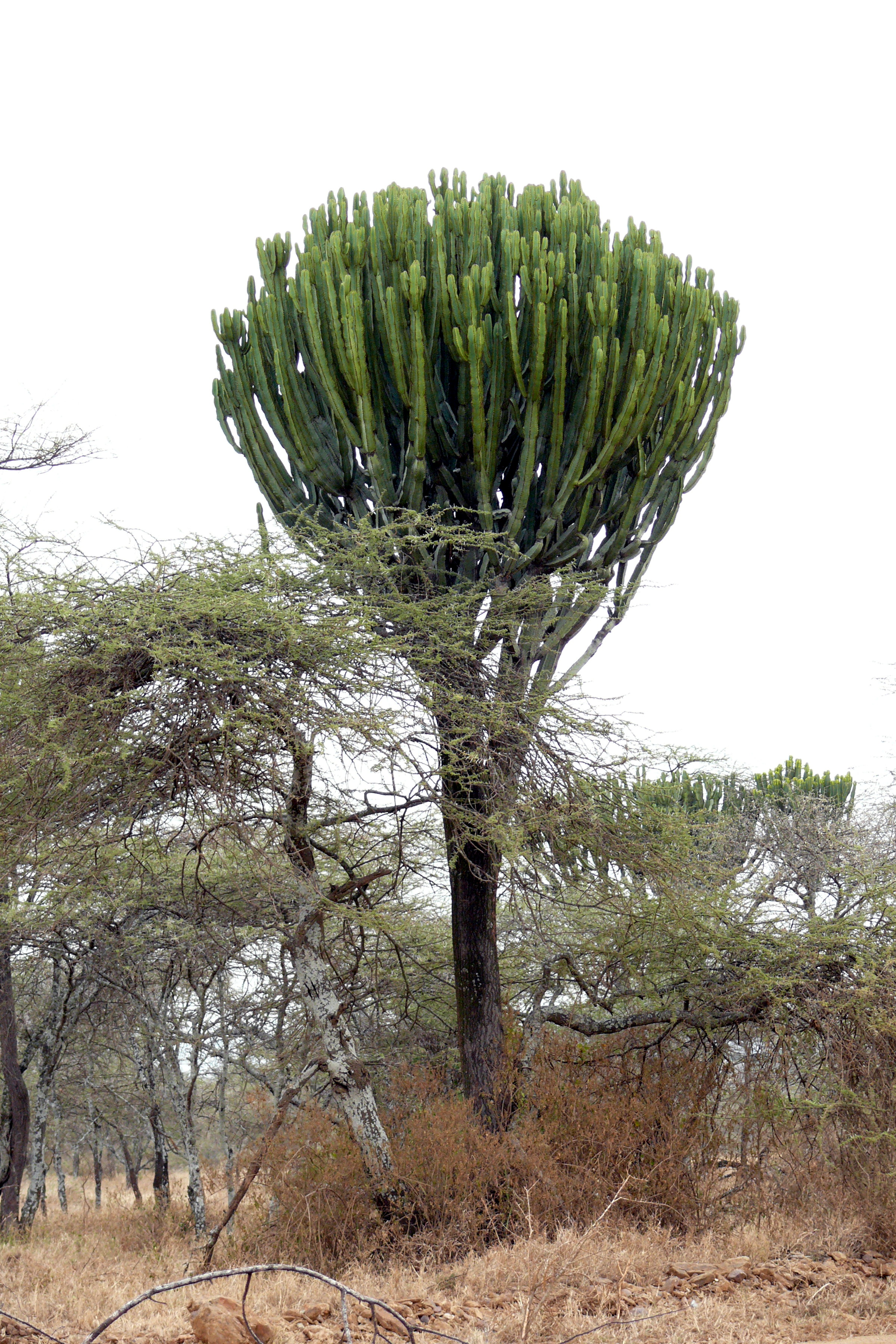
- Euphorbia candelabrum in the Serengeti
- CITES Appendix II (CITES)

Scientific classification
- Kingdom: Plantae
- Clade: Tracheophytes
- Clade: Angiosperms
- Clade: Eudicots
- Clade: Rosids
- Order: Malpighiales
- Family: Euphorbiaceae
- Genus: Euphorbia
- Species: E. candelabrum

Binomial name
- Euphorbia candelabrum Kotschy

Synonyms
- Euphorbia calycina N.E.Br.; Euphorbia confertiflora Volkens; Euphorbia murielii N.E.Br.; Euphorbia reinhardtii Volkens

= Euphorbia candelabrum =

Species of flowering plant

Euphorbia candelabrum is a succulent species of plant in the family Euphorbiaceae, one of several plants commonly known as candelabra tree. It is endemic to the Horn of Africa and eastern Africa along the East African Rift system. It is known in Ethiopia by its Amharic name, qwolqwal, or its Oromo name, adaamii. It is closely related to three other species of Euphorbia: Euphorbia ingens in the dry regions of southern Africa, Euphorbia conspicua from western Angola, and Euphorbia abyssinica, which is native to countries including Sudan, Eritrea, Djibouti, Ethiopia and Somalia.

Its Latin name derives from its growth habit, often considered to resemble the branching of a candelabrum. Candelabra trees can be found in dry deciduous and evergreen open wooded grasslands, on rocky slopes and on rare occasions termite mounds. As rainfall decreases, so does E. candelabrum's habitat range. Trees typically grow to be 12 metres in height; however, some specimens have been recorded to grow up to 20 metres tall.

Species such as Grewia and those in the Euphorbiaceae are considered to be fire-sensitive and typically restricted to termite mounds instead of dominating the open savanna However, E. candelabrum is widespread throughout the savanna and short-grass areas of the Queen Elizabeth National Park in Uganda. This is an unusual habitat for tall succulents, as they have been proven to typically be poor invaders of frequently burned stands of land. E. candelabrum's success as a tall succulent seems to be a result of heavy grazing by African mammals such as the Ugandan kob (Kobus kob) and waterbuck (Kobus ellipsiprymnus defassa) and an overall decrease in intense wildfires.

Some authorities further divide this species into two varieties, E. candelabrum var. candelabrum and E. candelabrum var. bilocularis.

Euphorbia candelabrum was used in traditional Ethiopian medicine. Mixed with clarified honey, its sap was used as a purgative to cure syphilis and, when mixed with other medicinal plants, as a salve to treat the symptoms of leprosy. The plant currently has negligible commercial value; Richard Pankhurst documents two different attempts near Keren in Eritrea to collect its gum before 1935, but neither attempt proved commercially viable.

Euphorbia candelabrum has been used in firewood, timber, and fencing. Its wood is light and durable, with a number of purposes including roofing, tables, doors, matches, boxes, mortars, musical instruments and saddles.

== Dangers ==
When damaged, E. candelabrum trees release an abundant amount of milky-white latex, which has a rubber content of 12.5%. This latex is extremely toxic due to its skin irritant and carcinogenic diterpene derivatives, mainly phorbol esters. In addition to irritation of the skin and mucous membranes, E. candelabrum latex may cause blindness if brought into contact with the eyes.

Various components of E. candelabrum plants can be utilized as poisons. The Ovaherero people of Namibia use its latex as an ingredient in arrow poison, while the Damara people use E. candelabrum latex extract or freshly pounded branches to poison water holes and streams. Its flowers produce nectar, but ingestion of E. candelabrum honey can cause a burning sensation in the mouth that is only intensified by drinking water.

Baboons seem to be unaffected by the sap and frequently consume the plant. A study done in Queen Elizabeth Park in West Uganda found that much of the damage done to E. candelabrum trees can be attributed to the feeding patterns of baboons. Fresh, young E. candelabrum branches are broken off by climbing baboons, which results in uneven growth. In addition to this, baboon feeding patterns affect the life cycle of E. candelabrum flowers and often causes sterility in many of the young stems.

== Medicinal use ==
Although Euphorbia candelabrum is known to be quite toxic, it has seen medicinal use. Its latex contains highly irritant ingenol diterpene esters, which prove to be both harmful and helpful. On top of blistering and irritation, ingenol products demonstrate tumour-promoting activity, causing cells to resist apoptosis and continue multiplying. A 1961 study found that latex from various Euphorbia species, including E. candelabrum, is a potent tumor-promoting agent. However, ingenol has been reported to encourage anti-HIV and anti-leukemia cellular activity that protects T-cells.

In folk medicine, in addition to being used as a purgative to cure syphilis or a salve to treat leprosy, E. candelabrum sap has been used in the treatment of coughs, tuberculosis, malaria and HIV infections. It has the ability to be mixed with fat and applied topically to heal wounds, sores, and warts.

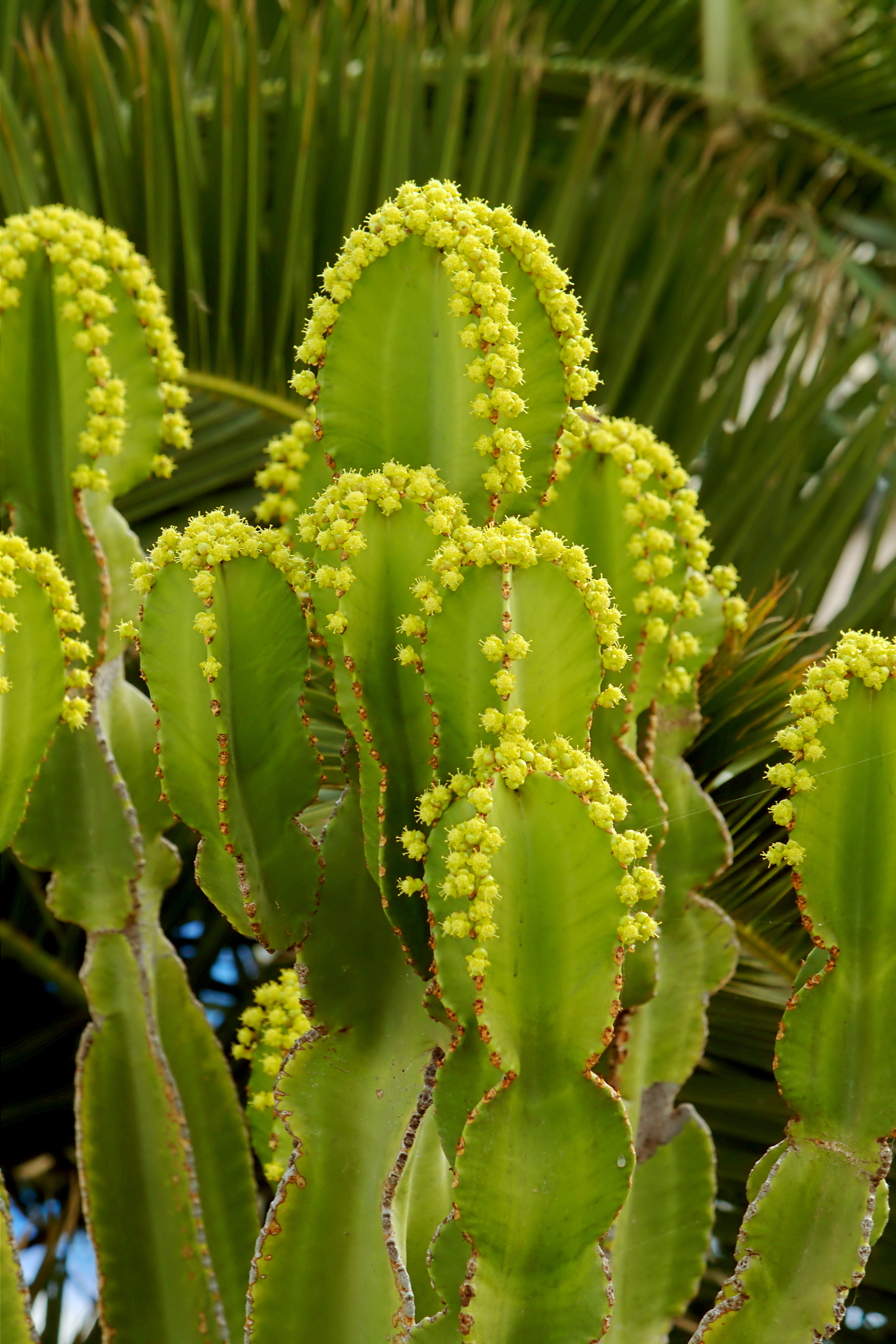
Branches

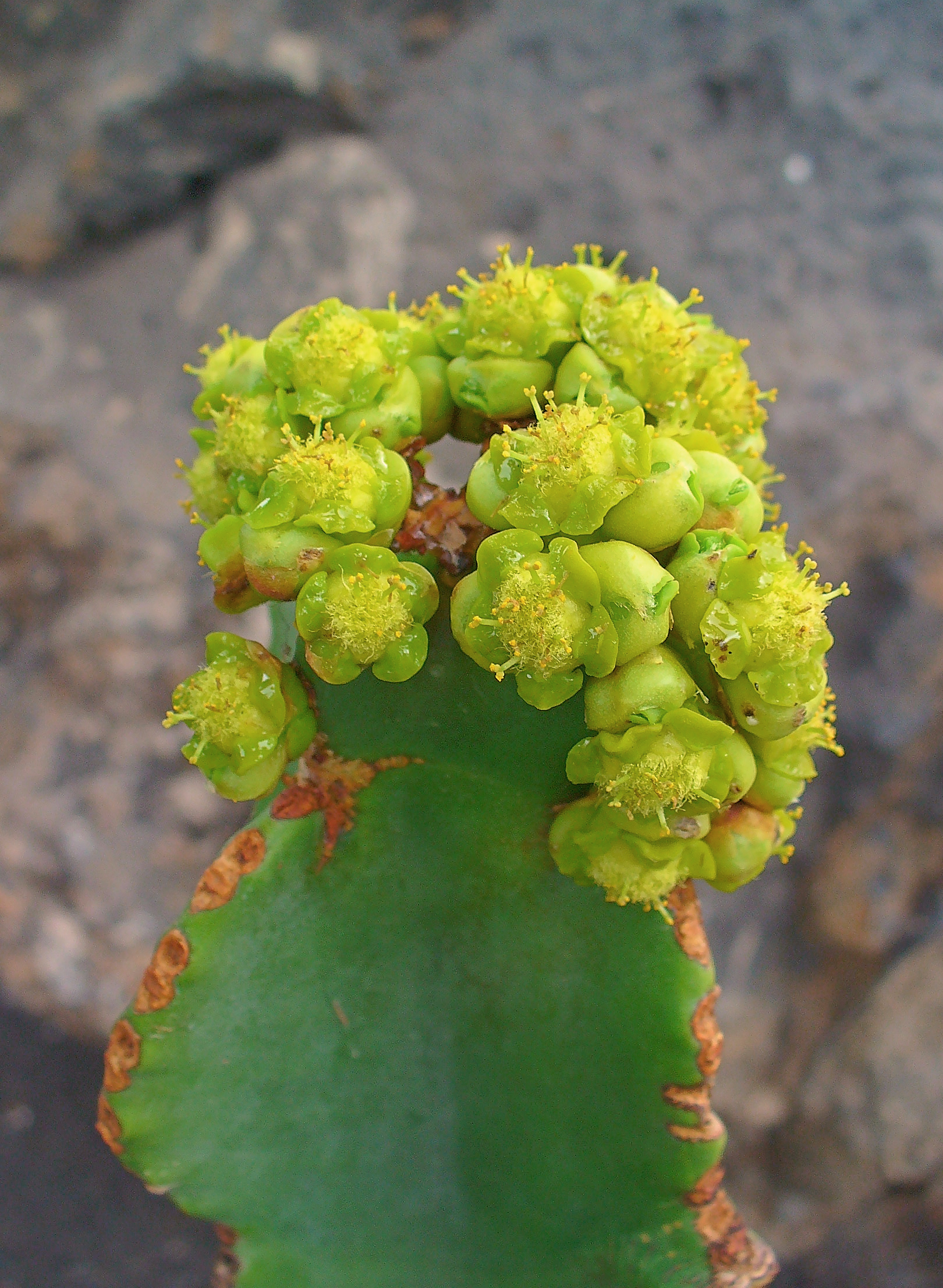
Cyathia

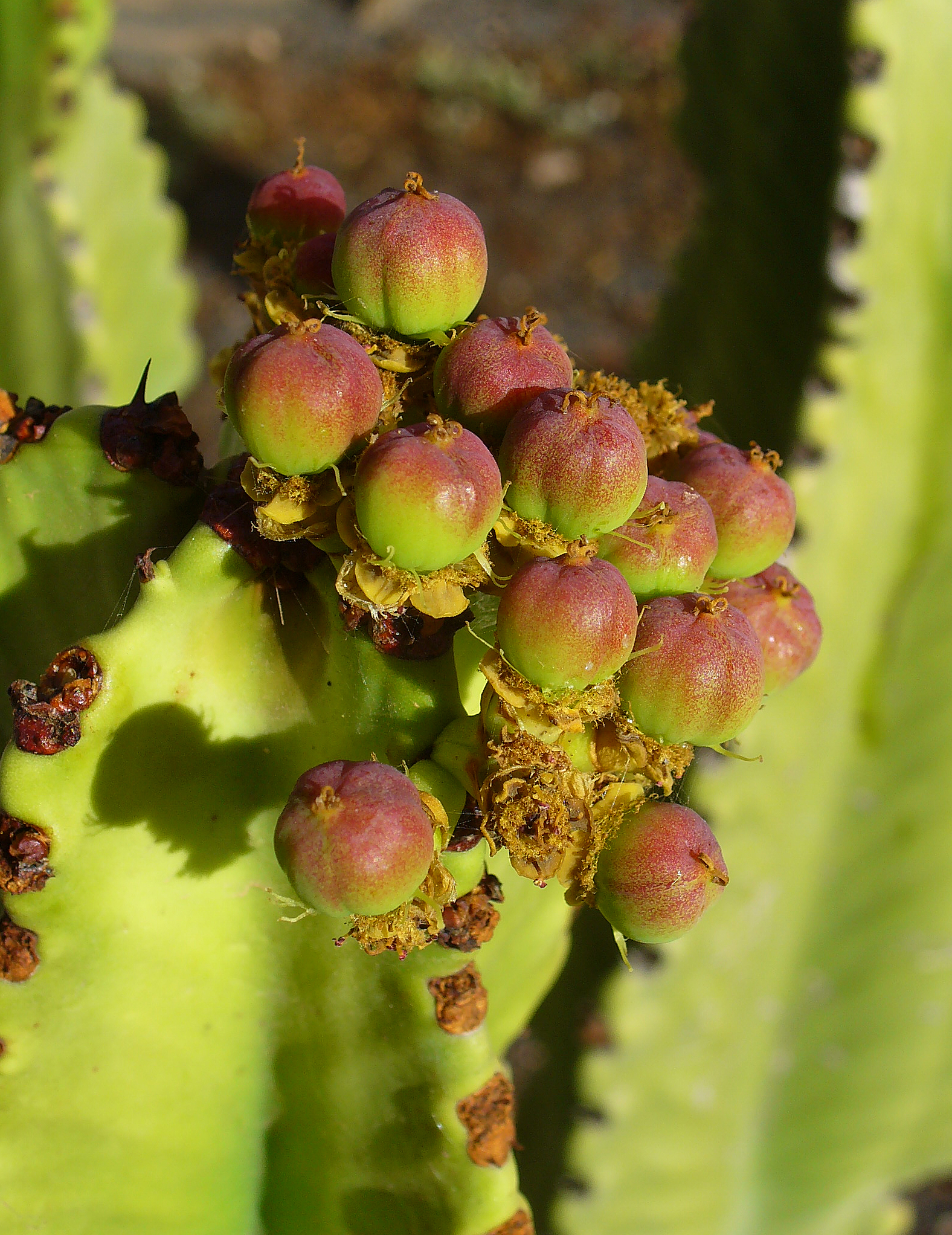
Fruits
