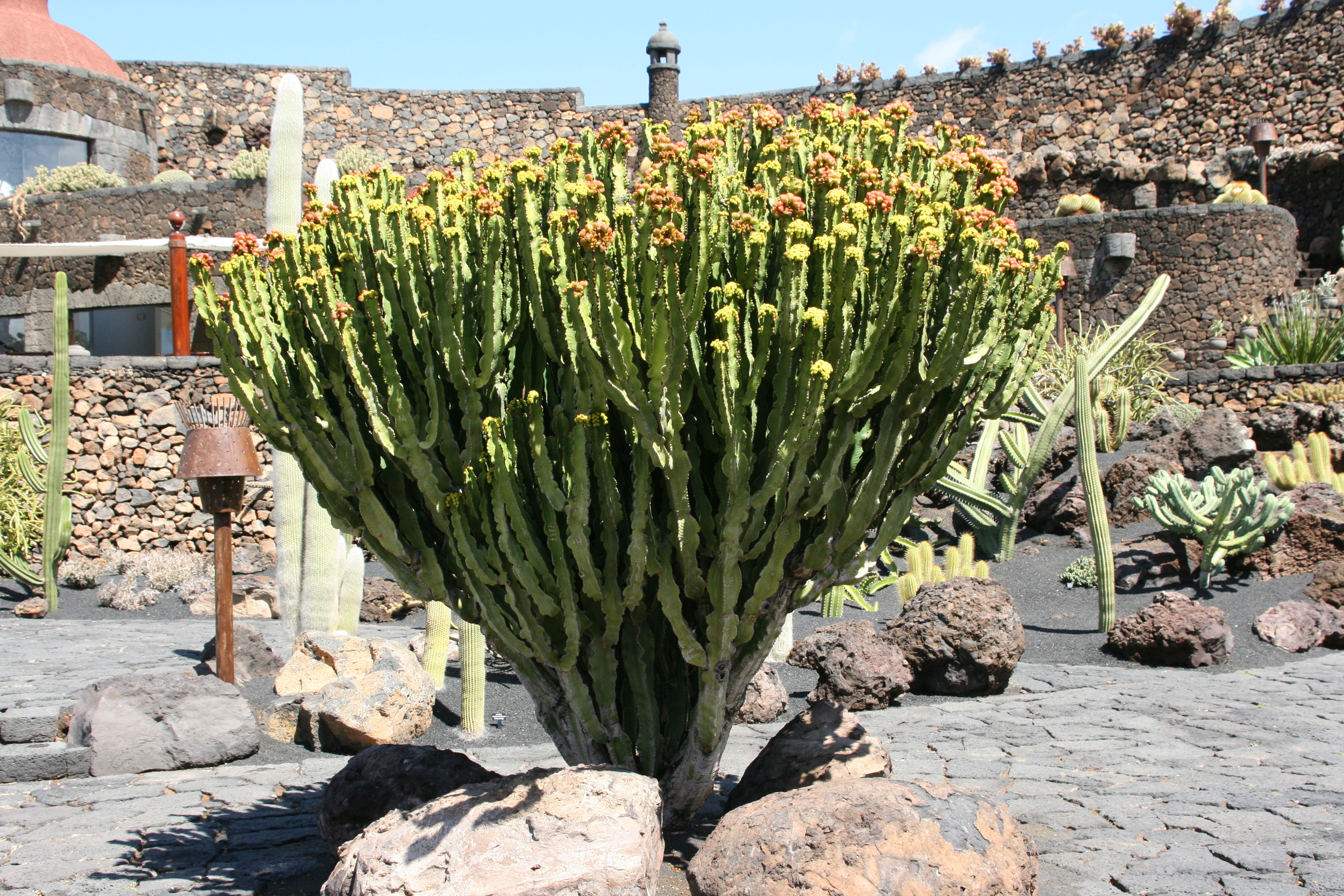
- CITES Appendix II

Scientific classification
- Kingdom: Plantae
- Clade: Tracheophytes
- Clade: Angiosperms
- Clade: Eudicots
- Clade: Rosids
- Order: Malpighiales
- Family: Euphorbiaceae
- Genus: Euphorbia
- Species: E. abyssinica

Binomial name
- Euphorbia abyssinica J.F.Gmel., 1791

Synonyms
- Euphorbia acrurensis N.E.Br.; Euphorbia aethiopum Croizat; Euphorbia controversa N.E.Br.; Euphorbia disclusa N.E.Br.; Euphorbia erythraeae (Berger) N.E.Br.; Euphorbia grandis Lem.; Euphorbia neglecta N.E.Br.; Euphorbia neutra A.Berger; Euphorbia obovalifolia A.Rich.; Euphorbia officinarum var. kolquall Willd.; Euphorbia richardiana Baill.

= Euphorbia abyssinica =

Species of flowering plant

Euphorbia abyssinica, commonly known as the desert candle or candelabra spurge, is a species of plant in the family Euphorbiaceae. E. abyssinica is endemic to Ethiopia, Somalia, Sudan and Eritrea. It was first described in 1791, by the German botanist Johann Friedrich Gmelin. In its native habitat, it can grow up to 10 m (33 ft) tall. The woody stem is used for firewood and as timber in roofing, furniture and other items, and the sap is used in traditional medicine. It is also cultivated as an ornamental house plant.

== Description ==
E. abyssinica is a large, succulent, erect tree-like plant growing to a height of about 9–10 m (30–33 ft). It can grow singly or form candelabra-like clumps. The main stem becomes woody as it ages, and sends out green side branches; these have between five and eight ribs or angles and branch at intervals. The terminal branches have three to five ribs, typically four. The ribs of new shoots bear small rounded protuberances, and it is on these that the leaves, flowers and fruit grow. The leaves are small, leathery and oval, and these soon fall in the dry season. The flowers have distinctive yellowish bracts but no petals; the male flowers have a single stamen, and the female flowers a stalked pistil and branched stigmas. The fruits are capsules with three compartments. The plants exude toxic latex-like sap which can cause blindness, and irritation and blistering of the skin.

== Taxonomy ==
Euphorbia abyssinica was first described as a species by Johann Friedrich Gmelin in 1791. Gmelin referred to an illustration in a book by James Bruce first published in 1790. Carl Ludwig Willdenow in his 1799 revision of Carl Linnaeus's Species Plantarum treated the plant in the same illustration as the variety β kolquall of Euphorbia officinarum. The description by Bruce refers to the "eyes" on the sides having "five thorns", a feature Gmelin regarded as distinctive. However, as N. E. Brown noted in 1912, the illustration shows paired thorns. In the same work, Brown described five other species of Euphorbia that he considered distinct from E. officinarum, but which Plants of the World Online treated as synonyms of E. abyssinica, as of March 2021: E. acrurensis, E. controversa, E. disclusa, E. erythraeae (elevated from a variety) and E. neglecta.

=== Phylogeny ===
A molecular phylogenetic study in 2011 found that E. officinarum was a member of a well supported clade within Euphorbia sect. Euphorbia. Two of its closest relatives, Euphorbia ingens and Euphorbia ampliphylla, are also from eastern Africa and form giant trees at maturity. The other two species in the clade also form a basal trunk or caudex, distinct from the branches.

- - Euphorbia stellata
  - - Euphorbia decidua
    - - Euphorbia ingens
      - - Euphorbia abyssinica
        - Euphorbia ampliphylla

== Distribution and habitat ==
E. abyssinica is native to the Horn of Africa where it grows in Ethiopia, Somalia, Sudan and Eritrea. It is found on arid hillsides, in montane woodland and on scrubby savannahs, sometimes in dense groves and other times growing by itself. It occurs at altitudes of 840–1,460 m (2,760–4,790 ft).

== Uses ==
Euphorbia abyssinica is cultivated as an ornamental house plant, being promoted for its architectural form and ease of maintenance. It is also grown as a garden plant in suitable climates, including under its synonym Euphorbia acrurensis. In its native countries, the woody tree-like stem is used for firewood and as timber in roofing, furniture, wooden saddles and other items. The sap can be used to kill ticks on cattle. In traditional medicine, the sap has been mixed with butter to treat fungal infections of the skin. The sap has also been used in cases of visceral leishmaniasis and malaria. It has also been found to promote the rooting of cuttings of such plants as Boswellia papyrifera. This is because the sap contains the growth regulator hormone indole-3-acetic acid; branches and twigs that become detached root easily, and the plant is sometimes used to form a living fence. When propagated by cuttings, E. abyssinica does not develop the distinctive trunk different in appearance from the branches that is characteristic of naturally occurring plants.
