= Ragalna =

- Comune
- Comune di Ragalna
- Location within Italy Location within Sicily
- Coordinates: 37°38′N 14°56′E
- Country: Italy
- Region: Sicily
- Metropolitan city: Catania (CT)

Government
  - Mayor: Antonio Caruso

Area
  - Total: 39.2 km^{2} (15.1 sq mi)
- Elevation: 830 m (2,720 ft)

Population (31 December 2010)
  - Total: 3,649
  - Density: 93.1/km^{2} (241/sq mi)
- Demonym: Ragalnesi
- Time zone: UTC+1 (CET)
  - Summer (DST): UTC+2 (CEST)
- Postal code: 95030
- Dialing code: 095
- Website: www.comune.ragalna.ct-egov.it

Ragalna is a comune (municipality) in the Metropolitan City of Catania in the Italian region Sicily, located about 150 kilometres (93 mi) southeast of Palermo and about 20 kilometres (12 mi) northwest of Catania.

Points of interest include the Giardino Botanico "Nuova Gussonea", a botanical garden on Mount Etna.

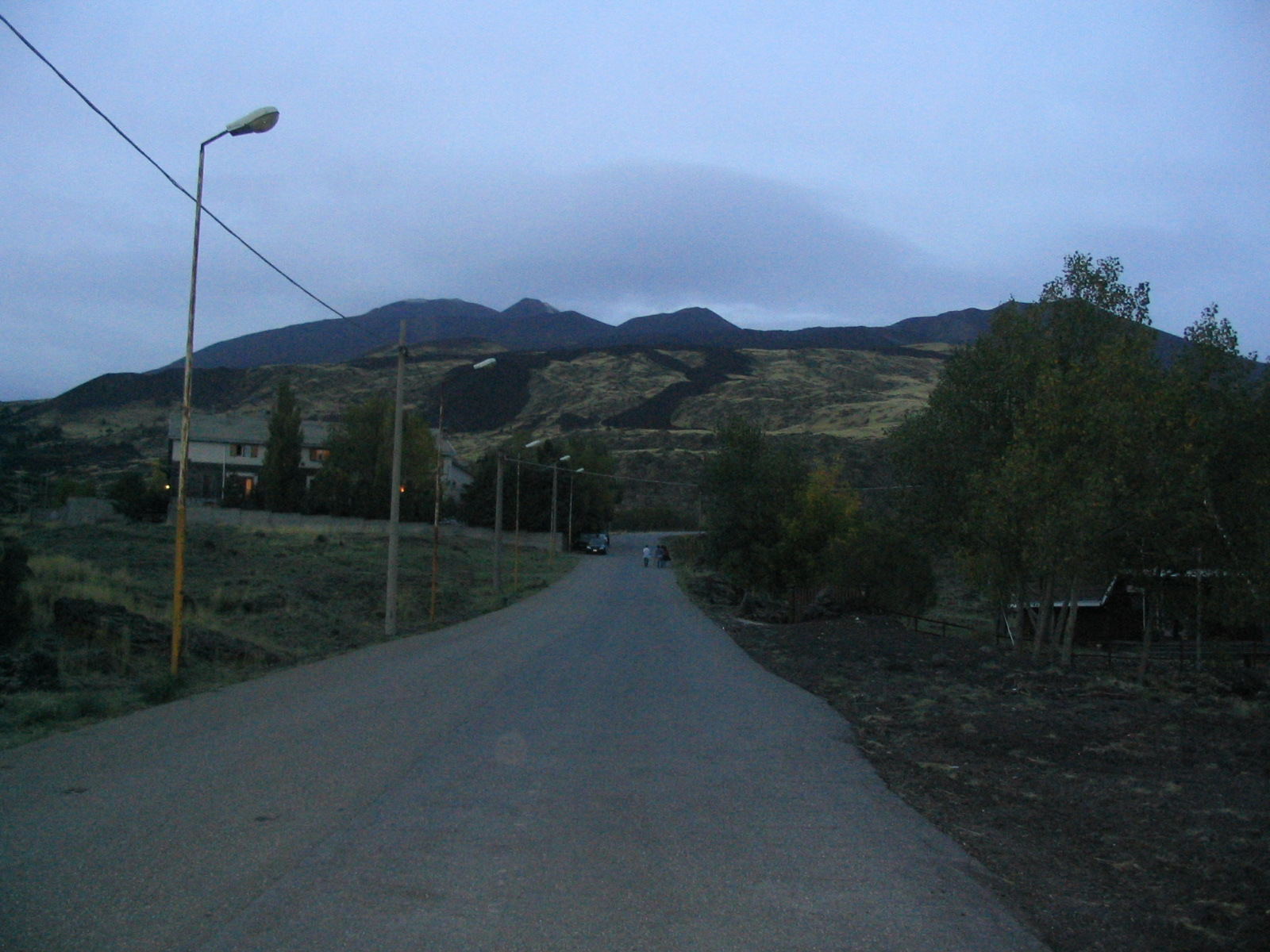
View of Mount Etna from Serra la Nave, Ragnala
