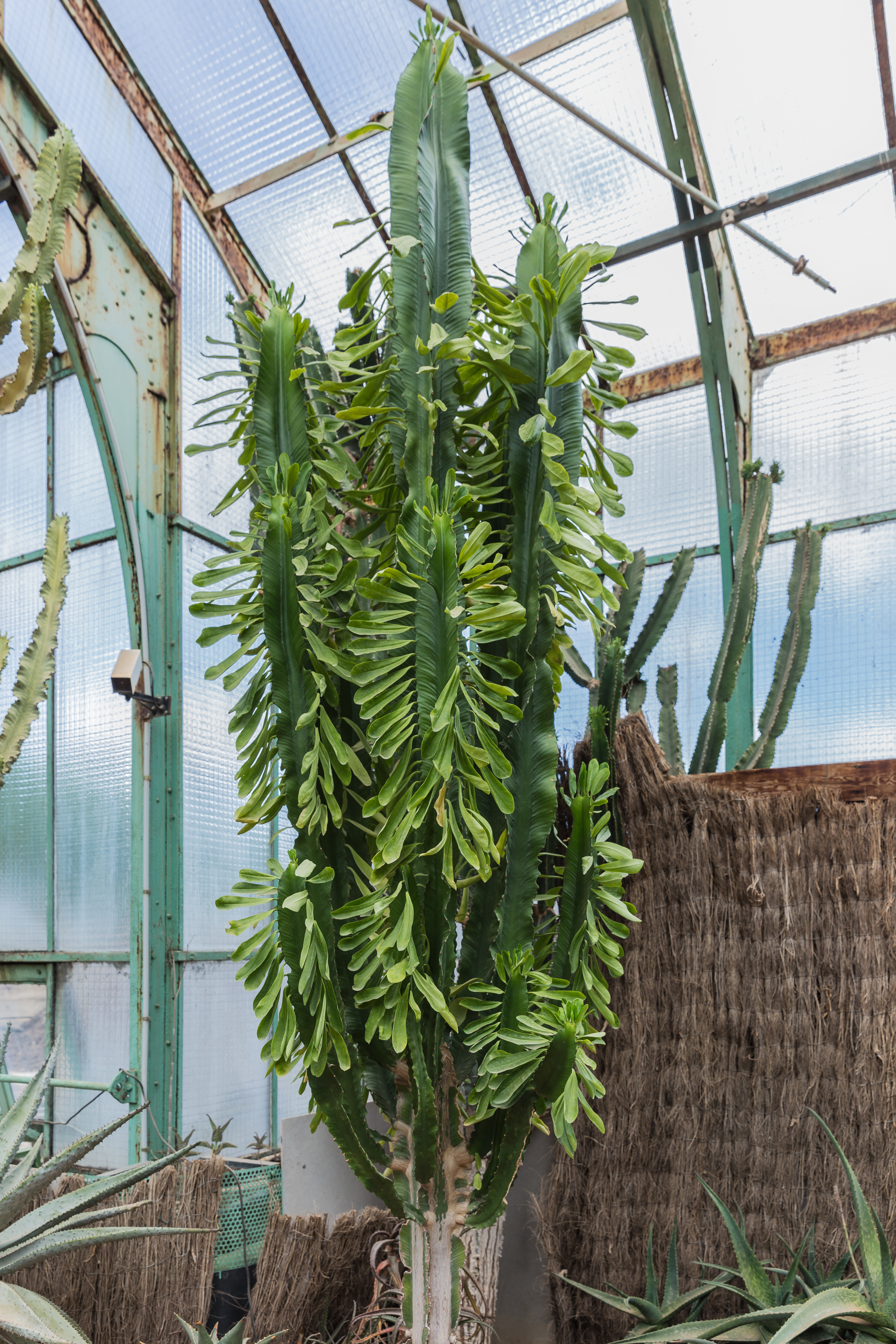
- At Jardin botanique de Lyon
- CITES Appendix II (CITES)

Scientific classification
- Kingdom: Plantae
- Clade: Tracheophytes
- Clade: Angiosperms
- Clade: Eudicots
- Clade: Rosids
- Order: Malpighiales
- Family: Euphorbiaceae
- Genus: Euphorbia
- Species: E. ampliphylla

Binomial name
- Euphorbia ampliphylla Pax

Synonyms
- Euphorbia winkleri Pax; Euphorbia menelikii Pax; Euphorbia sancta Pax

= Euphorbia ampliphylla =

Species of plant

Euphorbia ampliphylla (also called Euphorbia winklerii and Euphorbia obovalifolia) is a succulent rainforest tree of the montane rainforests throughout East Africa and belonging to the family Euphorbiaceae. The branches are each about 20 cm (8 in) diameter and are succulent, three-winged and pachycaulous. Like most Euphorbia species, it has milky white sap. The toxicity of many euphorbias is well known, but no specific information is available concerning E. ampliphylla. It is used locally for medical purposes. It is one of the tallest of all known succulent plants, definitely up to 30 m (98 ft) It is also the world's only known succulent rainforest tree.

As most other succulent members of the genus Euphorbia, its trade is regulated under Appendix II of CITES.
