= Giardino Botanico "Nuova Gussonea" =

Botanical garden in Italy

Coordinates: 37°38′N 14°56′E

The Giardino Botanico "Nuova Gussonea" is a botanical garden located at an altitude of 1,700 m (5,600 ft) on the southern side of Mount Etna, in area B of the Etna Natural Park in Ragalna in the province of Catania, Sicily, Italy. It has a surface of about 10 hectares (25 acres).

The garden was established in 1979 through an agreement between the Directorate General of Forests of the Sicilian Region and the University of Catania, and inaugurated in 1981. Its name honors botanist Giovanni Gussone, and reflects a short-lived previous garden established on the site in 1903.

The garden replicates the entire volcano's plant environments, including special features such as a lava flow and small caves. Major areas are as follows:

- Cisternazze - natural vegetation
- Flower beds - about 200 beds focused mainly on vegetation of Mount Etna, and arranged into areas according to altitude
- Lava cave - plants adapted to low light, including Asplenium septentrionale
- Lava flow - with natural vegetation
- Nursery - arranged in phylogenetic order
- Stream (seasonal) - poplars
- Wooded areas - primarily birch (Betula aetnensis), as well as beech, oak, poplar, etc.

The garden also contains a seed repository (Rifugio Valerio Giacomini) and a small meteorological station for recording climate data.

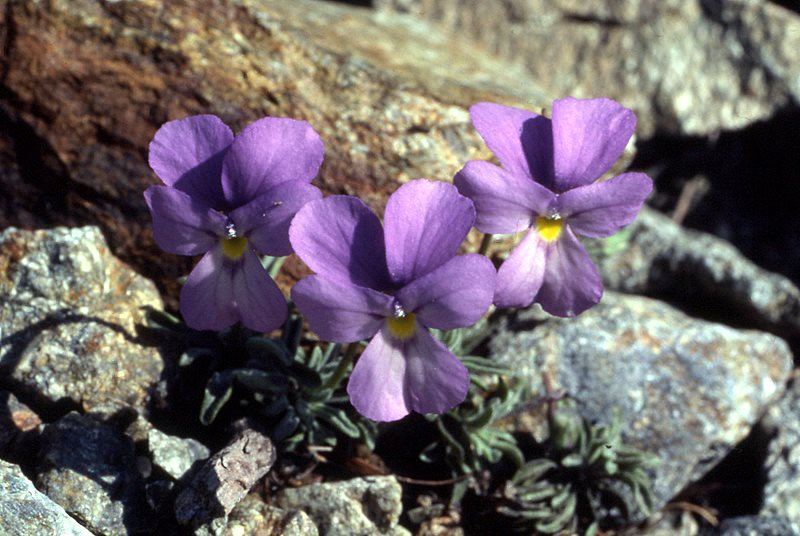
Giardino Botanico "Nuova Gussonea"

== See also ==
- List of botanical gardens in Italy
