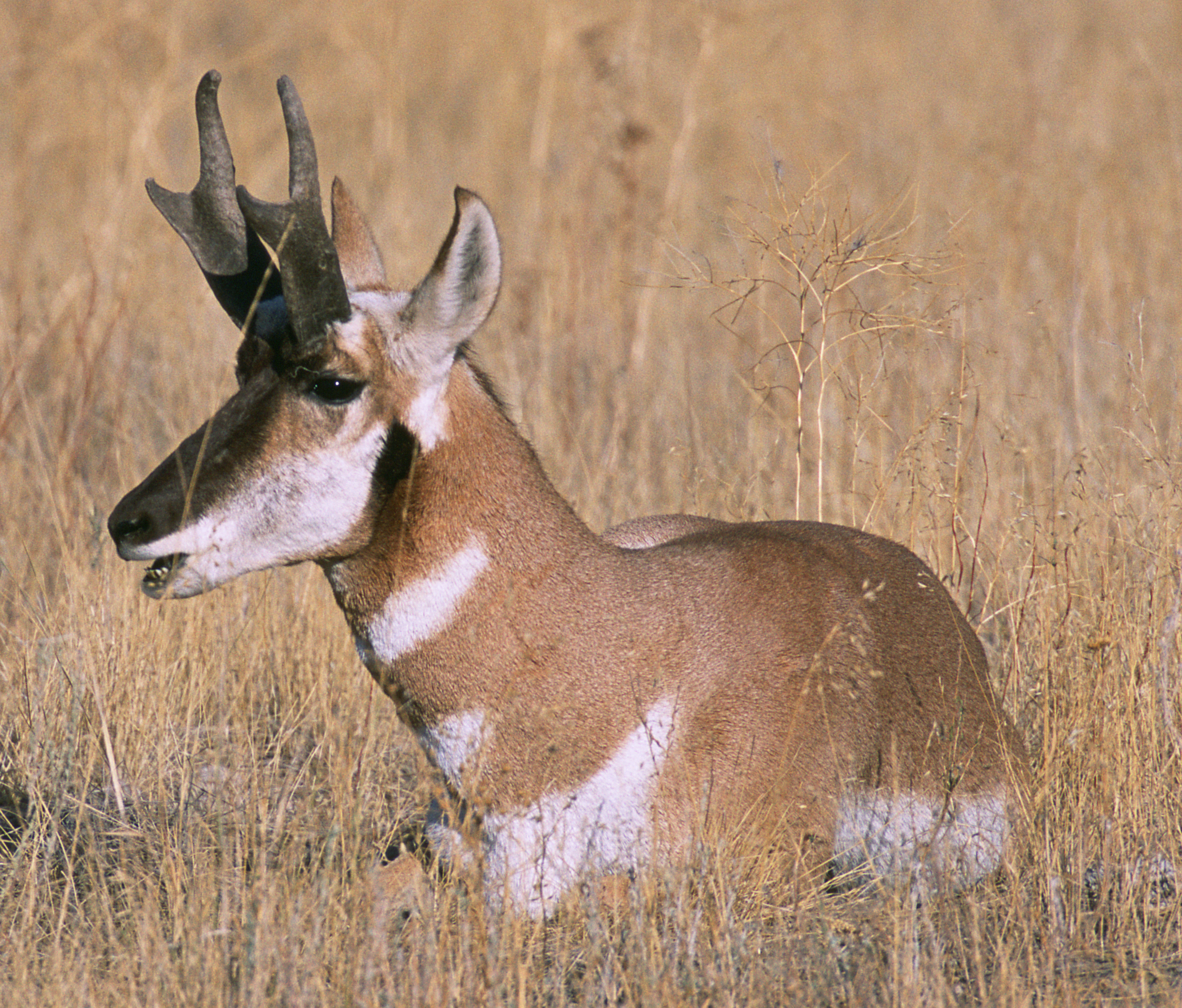

Scientific classification
- Kingdom: Animalia
- Phylum: Chordata
- Class: Mammalia
- Order: Artiodactyla
- Family: Antilocapridae
- Genus: Antilocapra
- Species: A. americana
- Subspecies: A. a. peninsularis

Trinomial name
- Antilocapra americana peninsularis Nelson, 1912

= Baja California pronghorn =

Pronghorn endemic to Baja California

The Baja California pronghorn or peninsular pronghorn (Antilocapra americana peninsularis) is a subspecies of pronghorn that is endemic to Baja California in Mexico. The wild population is estimated at 200.

== Population ==
The Baja California pronghorn is found on the Baja peninsula. Aerial surveys in the mid-1990s counted 117 and 151 individuals; the ground surveys results were 83, 39, and 48 individuals. Male to female ratios were 66:100 in the aerial survey and 140:100 in the ground survey. After this study, researchers proposed to capture 30 individuals, 12 males and 18 females, to radio-collar and study further.

== Recovery ==
The recovery for the Baja California pronghorn is affected by many different factors. Like most pronghorn subspecies, adequate nutrition is crucial for survival, but not uniquely to the Baja California pronghorn, human population increase and land development have drastically reduced their habitat. This creates barriers that do not allow genetic diversity and reduce the total area these animals can use to forage for food and find water. Conservation efforts must be conducted to save the habitat of the species; these can include stopping development in the current ranges of the Baja California pronghorn and reducing the number of males in the population, which will allow more genetic diversity and open up more habitat for females that are the key to recovery of the population.
