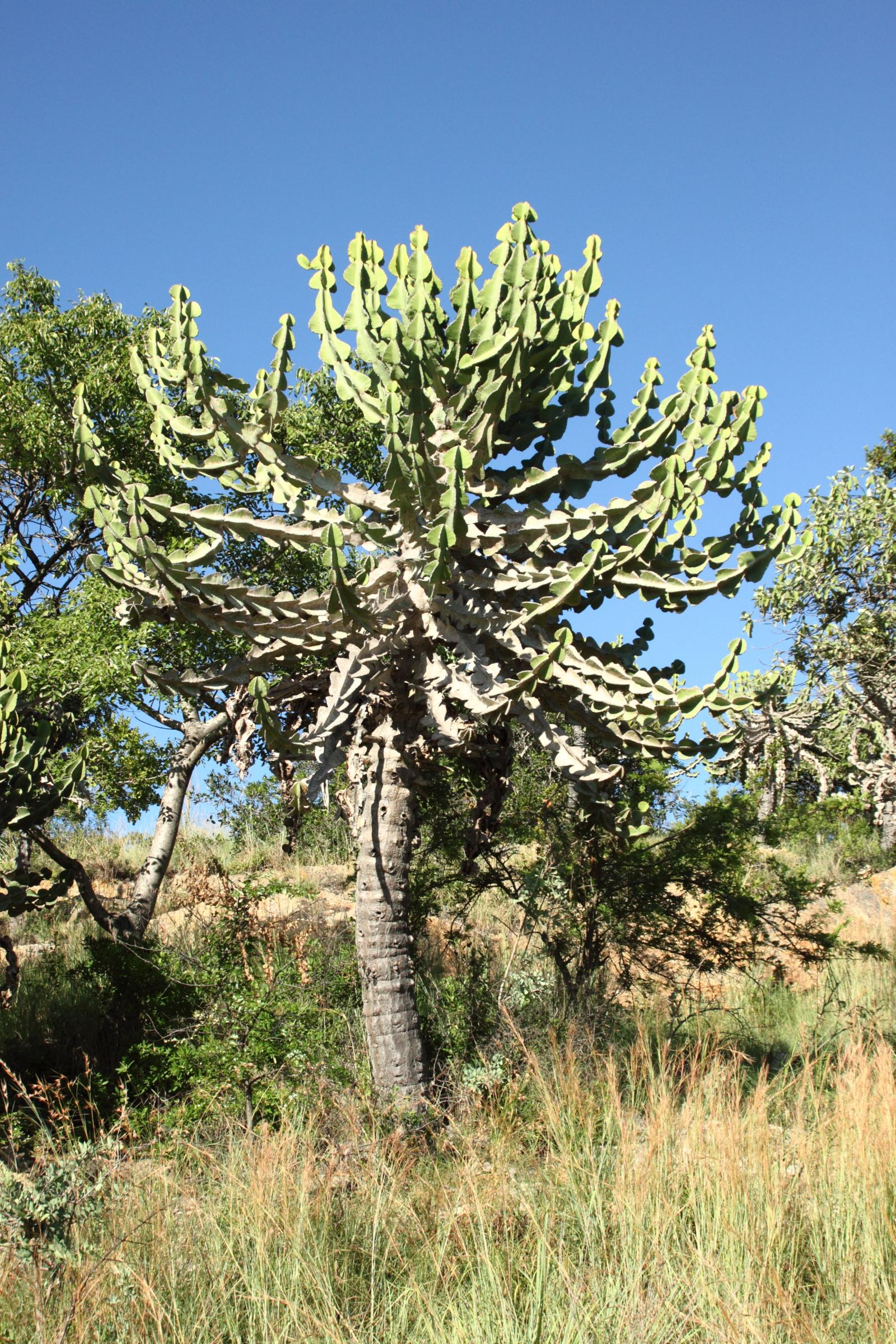

Conservation status
- Least Concern (IUCN 3.1)

Scientific classification
- Kingdom: Plantae
- Clade: Embryophytes
- Clade: Tracheophytes
- Clade: Spermatophytes
- Clade: Angiosperms
- Clade: Eudicots
- Clade: Rosids
- Order: Malpighiales
- Family: Euphorbiaceae
- Genus: Euphorbia
- Species: E. cooperi

Binomial name
- Euphorbia cooperi N.E.Br. ex A.Berger

= Euphorbia cooperi =

Species of flowering plant

Euphorbia cooperi is a species of flowering plant in the Euphorbiaceae family. It is commonly called Transvaal candelabra tree or bushveld candelabra euphorbia, and is found in South Africa.

== Gallery ==
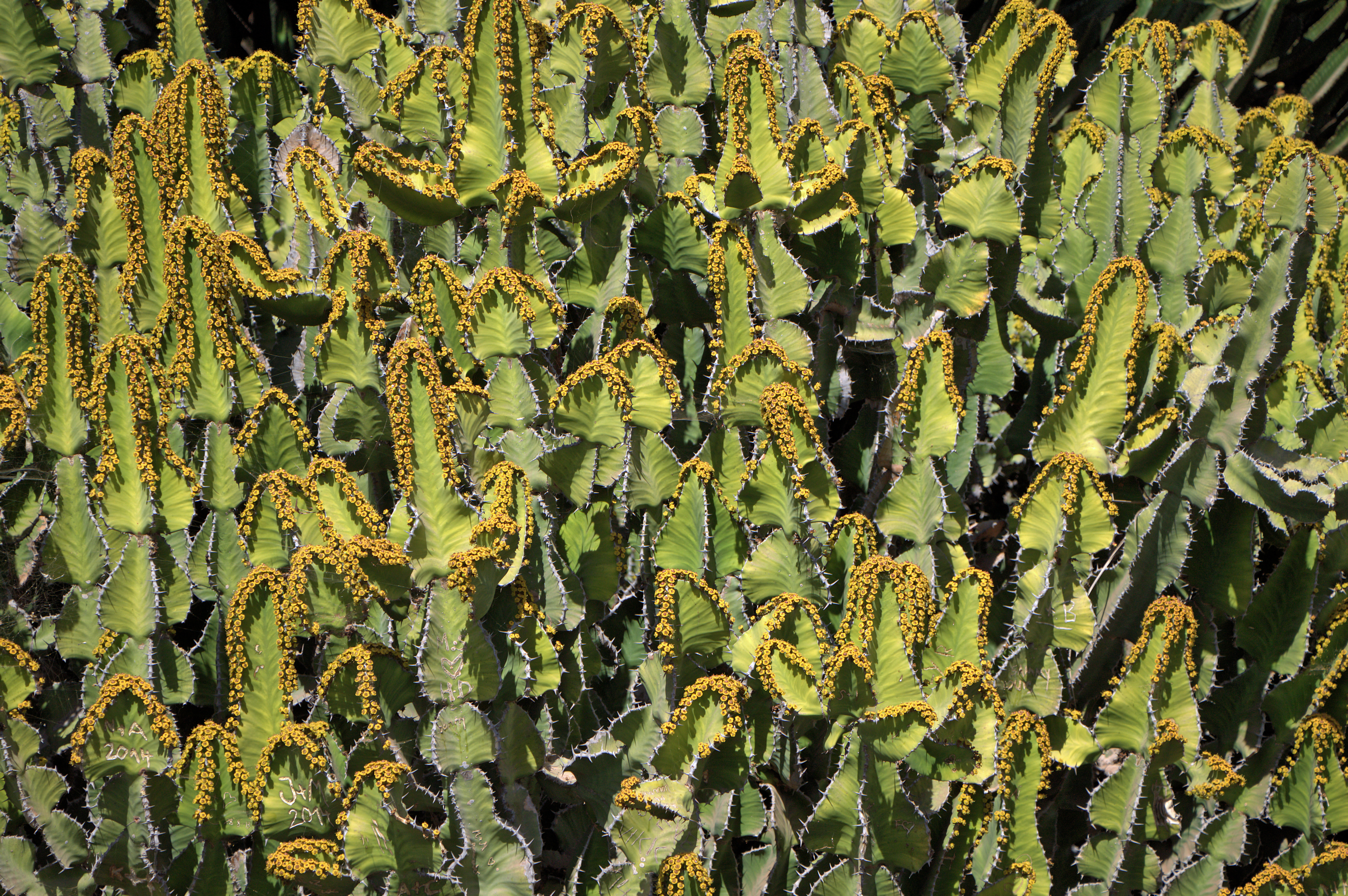
Branches with flowers (cyathia)

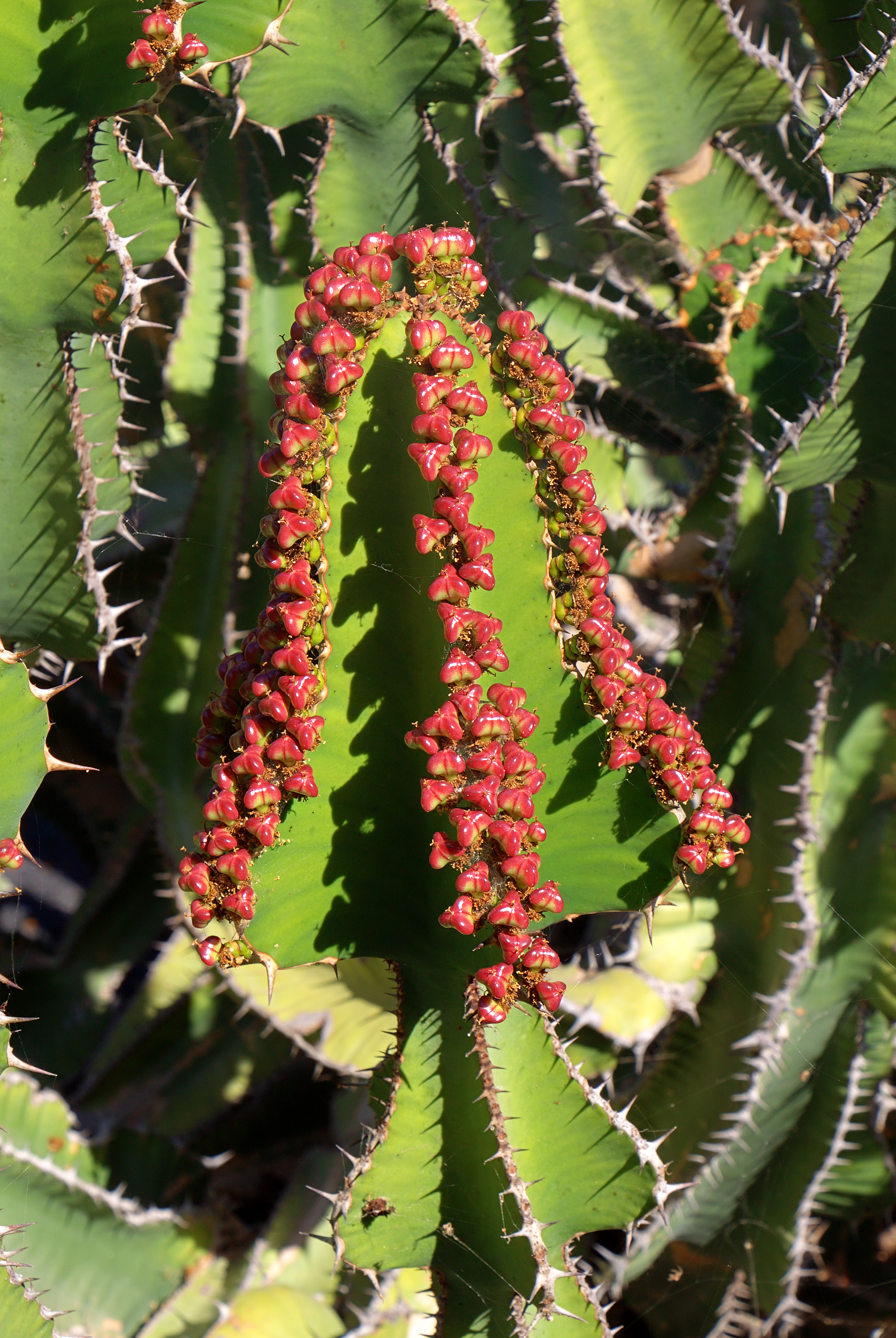
Branches with fruits
