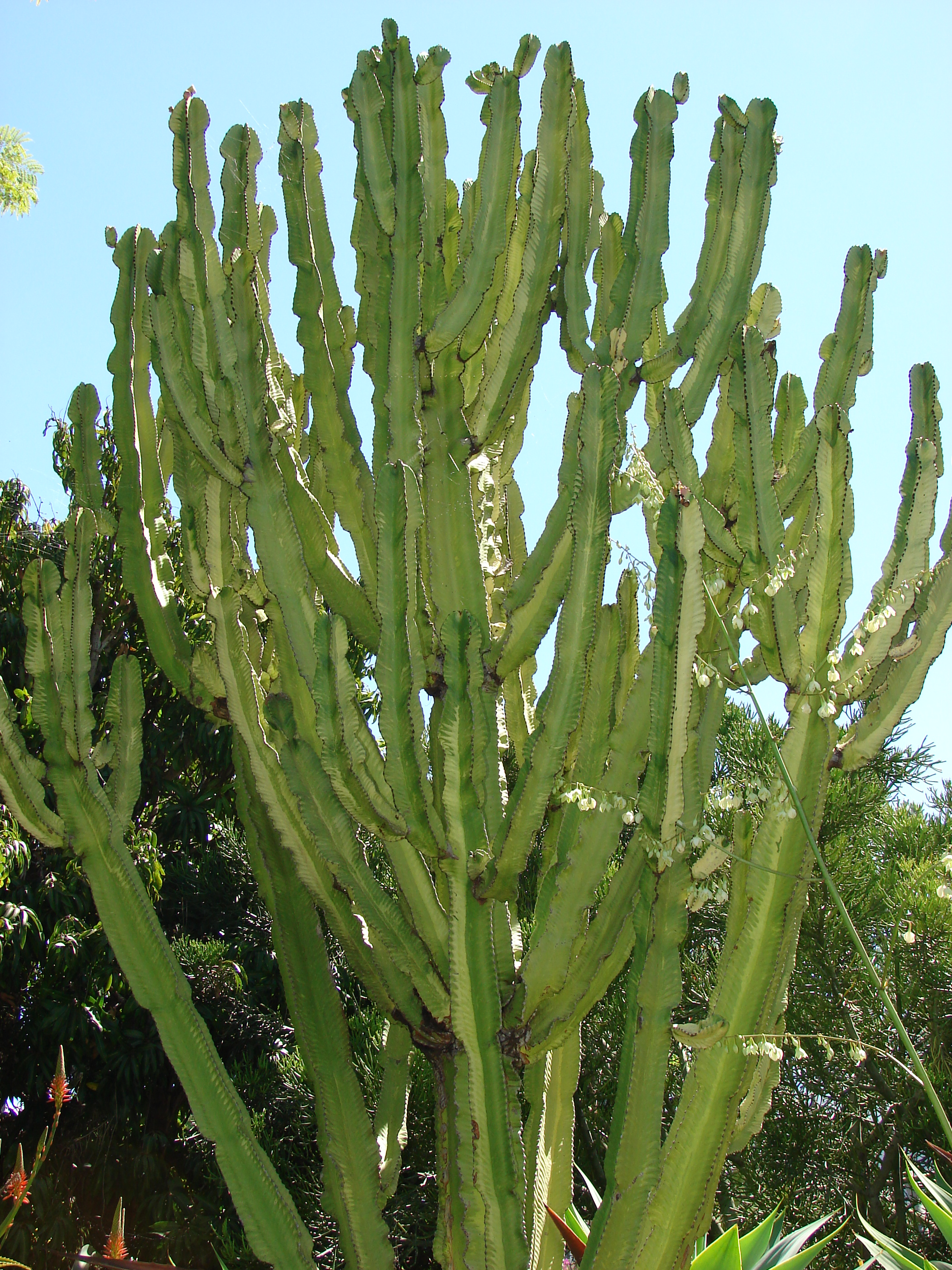

Conservation status
- Vulnerable (IUCN 2.3)

Scientific classification
- Kingdom: Plantae
- Clade: Embryophytes
- Clade: Tracheophytes
- Clade: Spermatophytes
- Clade: Angiosperms
- Clade: Eudicots
- Clade: Rosids
- Order: Malpighiales
- Family: Euphorbiaceae
- Genus: Euphorbia
- Species: E. ammak

Binomial name
- Euphorbia ammak Schweinf.

= Euphorbia ammak =

Species of flowering plant

Euphorbia ammak, commonly known as giant milk bush, African candelabra and candelabra spurge, is a species of plant in the family Euphorbiaceae native to the Arabian Peninsula.

As most other succulent members of the genus Euphorbia, its trade is regulated under Appendix II of CITES. In 1998, the plant was assessed for The IUCN Red List of Threatened Species and was listed as Vulnerable.

== Description ==
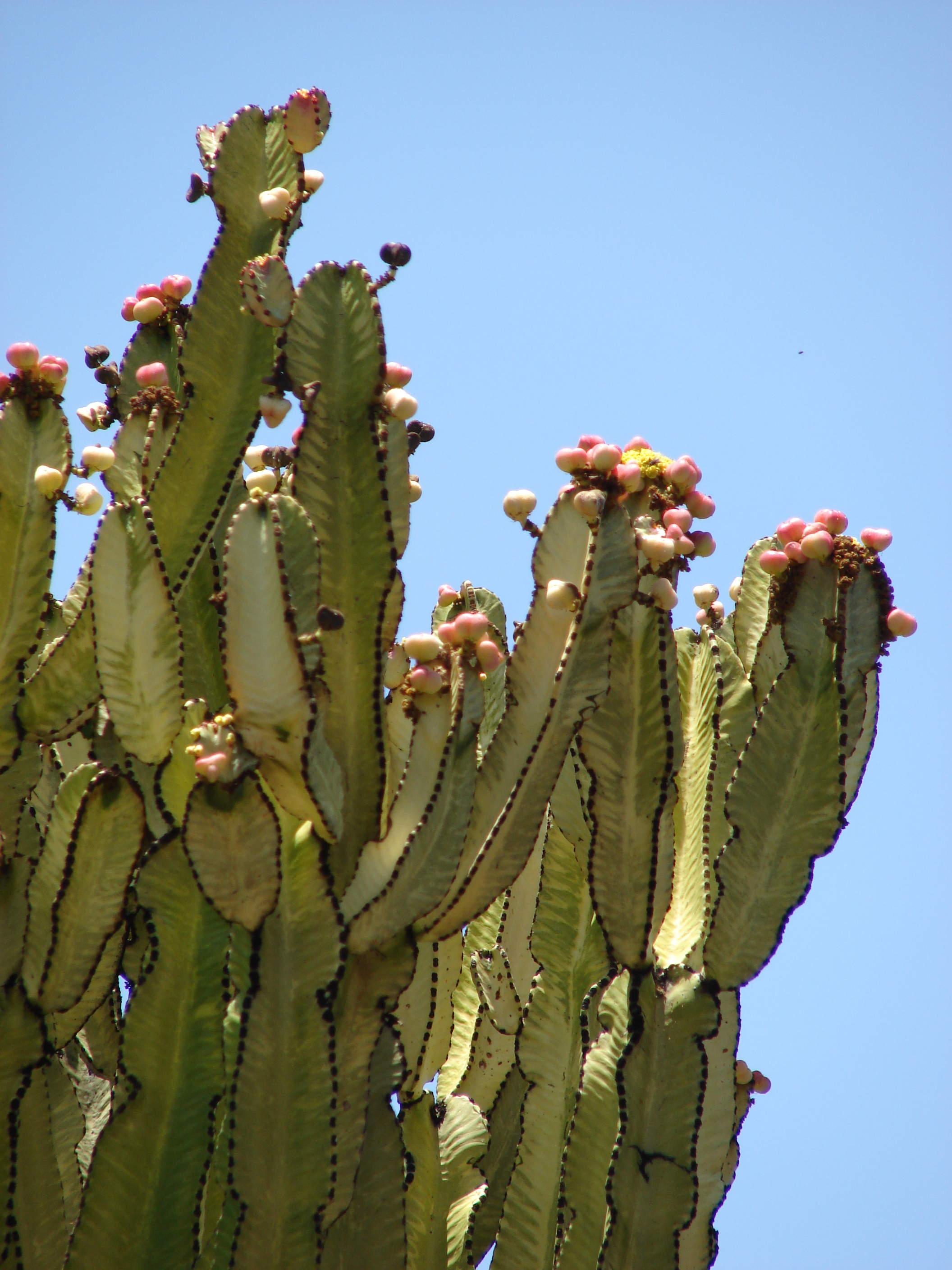
Emerging flowers

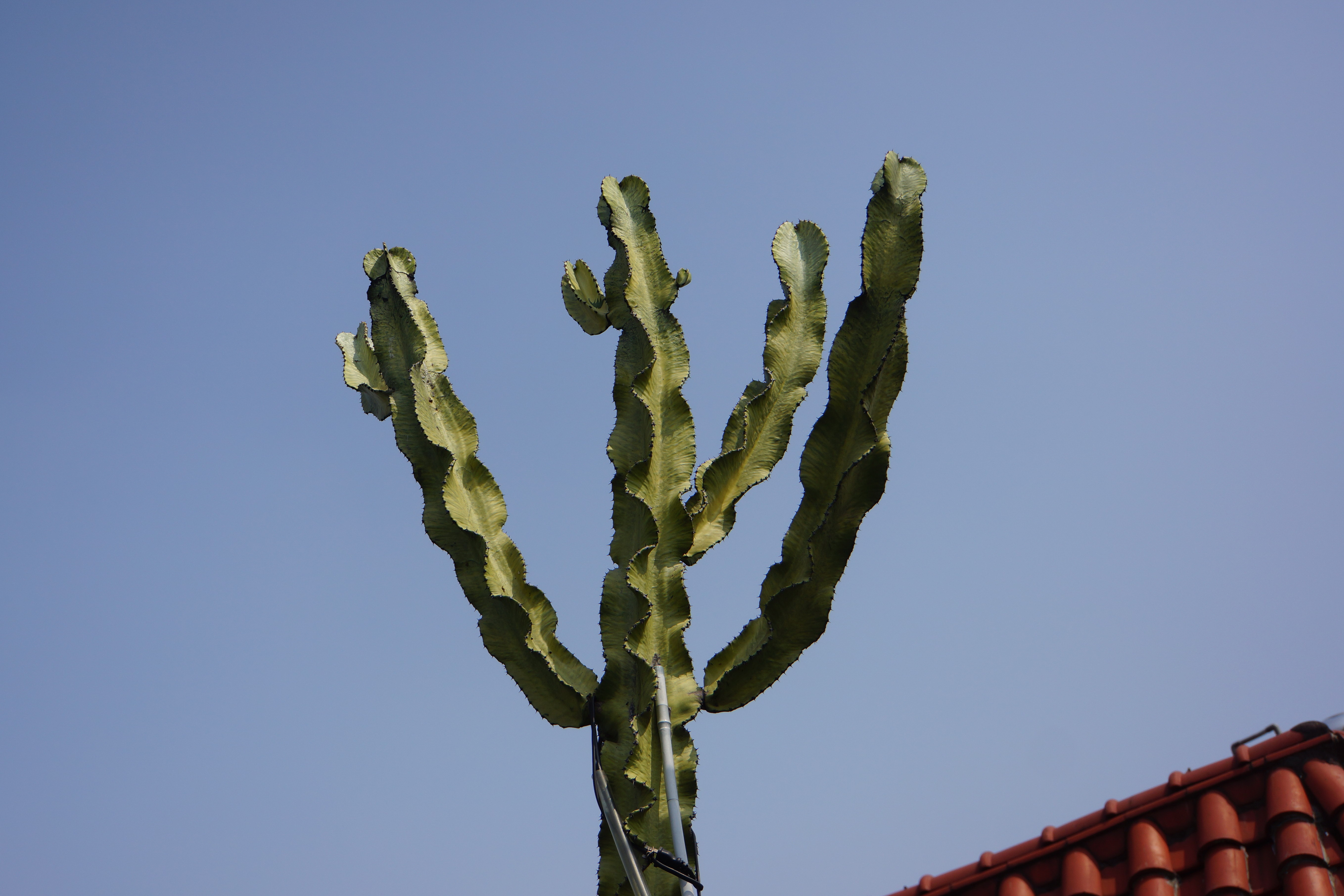
Growth structure

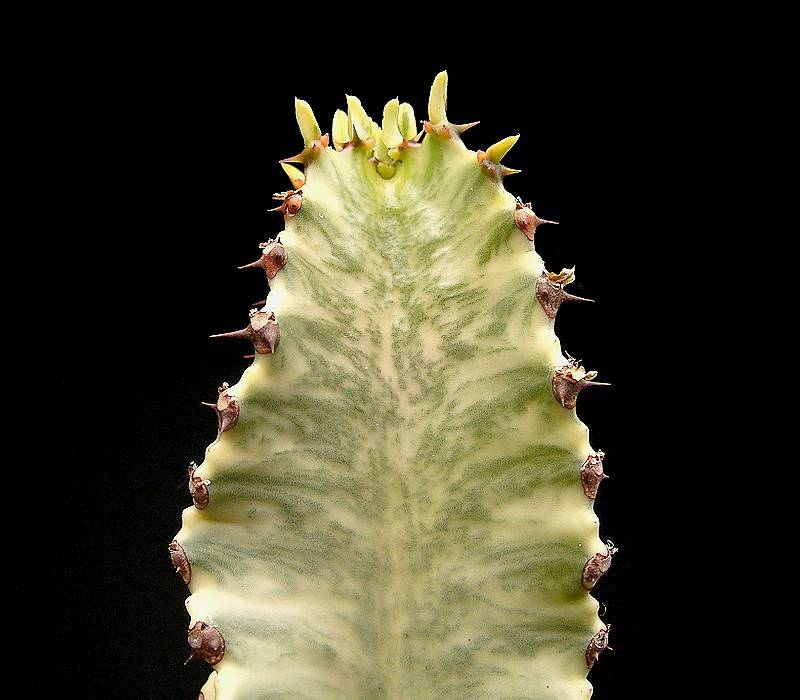
Variegata

It forms a tree up to 10 meters high with upright and curved main shoots. The square shoots reach a thickness of 12 to 15 centimeters. On the wing-like edges there are curved teeth at a distance of up to 1 centimeter from each other. The inverted triangular thorn shields stand individually. Thorns up to 1 centimeter long are formed. In a suitable climate (humid and warm at the same time) the leaves appear at the tops of the branches.

On seedlings, the lanceolate leaves are up to 40 millimeters long and up to 7 millimeters wide; on younger shoots of older plants the leaves are not so large. Branches initially about 60 cm long, rising vertically upwards, 4-5-ribbed, deeply furrowed, dark green; ribs thick, wavy; young non-flowering shoots with a pair of thorns at a distance of 1 cm from each other. The branches are covered with spines around 1 cm long. Thorns dark brown, 1 cm long, in the form of horns or inverted triangles. Its short trunk, which is 10-15 cm thick, resembles a cactus, and its inversely conical crown makes it look like a candelabrum, hence one of its common names.

=== Inflorescence ===
The inflorescence is formed from individual, simple and almost sessile cymes. The cyathia reach about 10 millimeters in diameter. The nectar glands are elliptical and the ovary has a three-lobed, slit perianth. The deeply lobed fruit is on a thick, 9 to 14 millimeter long stalk and is 9 millimeters long and 14 millimeters wide. The almost round and smooth seed reaches 3 millimeters in diameter.

== Habitat ==
It is native to the arid regions of Saudi Arabia and Yemen. It grows in shrubby areas between 1000 and 1500 m above sea level, possibly as high as 2500 metres above sea. It is also found in rocky places in plains, on precipitous hillsides and thorny scrublands where it has now become rare in its native range (though it remains common in areas in North Yemen).

== Cultivation ==
The plant is easy to grow and prefers well drained soil (such as clay and pumice) in full sun, though younger plants may perform better indoors as the plant tolerates some shade. Watering should be regular in summer, and the plant should be kept dry in winter. A moderately fast grower and long-living, it matures and becomes large in 3-5 years. In addition to being frost-tender, the plant can be affected by mealybugs and, very rarely, scales. Strong winds can also affect the columns. It can easily be propagated by cuttings, though the cutting must callus for a week or two before placed in dry soil.

In Australia, the plant has adapted well in coastal areas. Euphorbia ammak 'Variegeta', a variegated form found in cultivation, features a creamy-yellow and pale blue-green surface.
