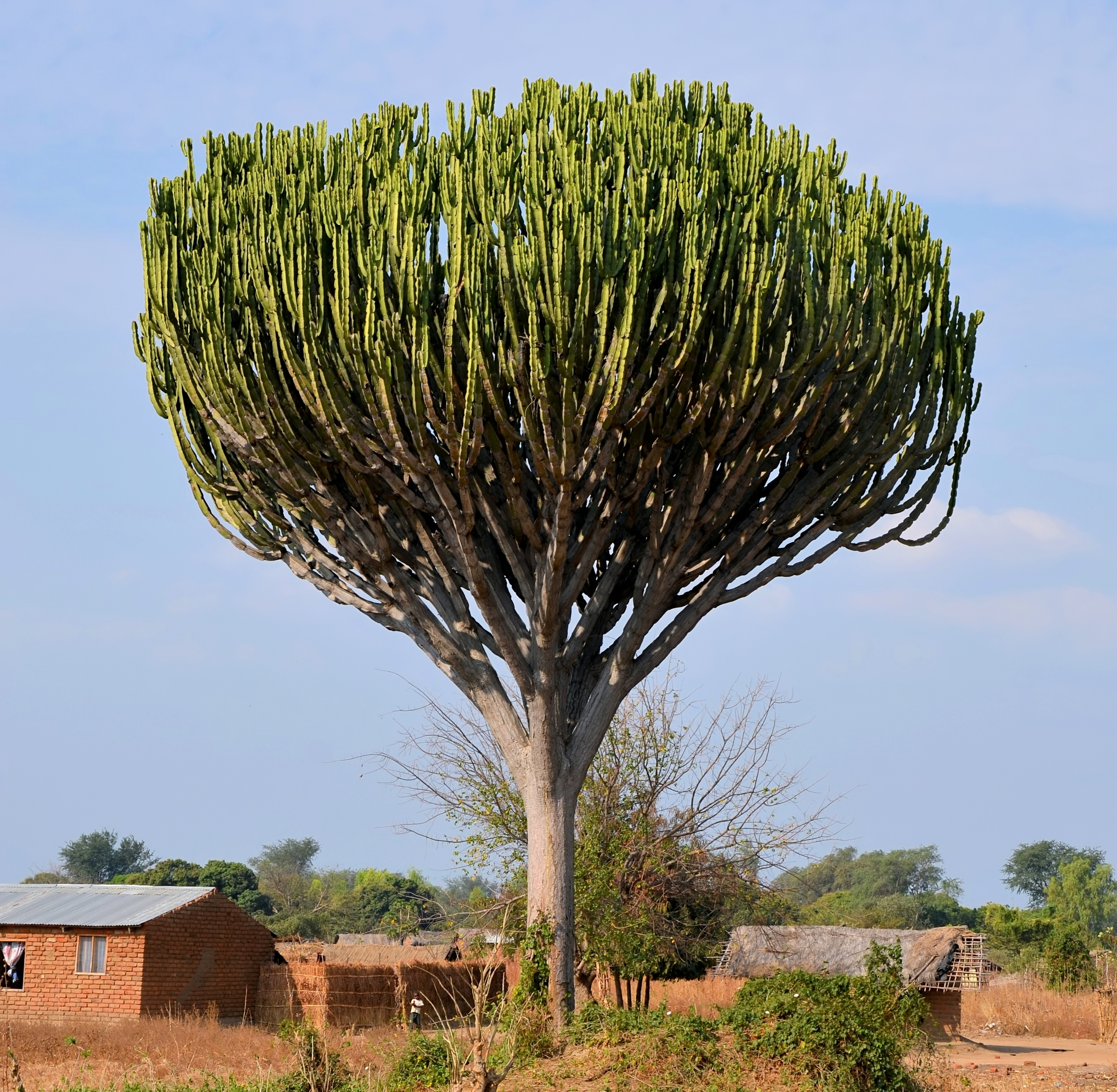

Conservation status
- Least Concern (IUCN 3.1)

Scientific classification
- Kingdom: Plantae
- Clade: Embryophytes
- Clade: Tracheophytes
- Clade: Spermatophytes
- Clade: Angiosperms
- Clade: Eudicots
- Clade: Rosids
- Order: Malpighiales
- Family: Euphorbiaceae
- Genus: Euphorbia
- Species: E. ingens

Binomial name
- Euphorbia ingens E.Mey. ex Boiss.

Synonyms
- Euphorbia bilocularis N.E.Br. Euphorbia candelabrum var. bilocularis (N.E.Br.) S.Carter; Euphorbia confertiflora Volkens; Euphorbia reinhardtii Volkens; Euphorbia reinhardtii var. bilocularis (N.E.Br.) Oudejans; Euphorbia similis A.Berger; Euphorbia tozzii Chiov.

= Euphorbia ingens =

Species of flowering plant

Euphorbia ingens is a species of flowering plant in the family Euphorbiaceae. It is native to dry areas of southern Africa. It is popularly known as the candelabra tree or naboom. Its milky latex can be extremely poisonous and is a dangerous irritant.

== Growth ==
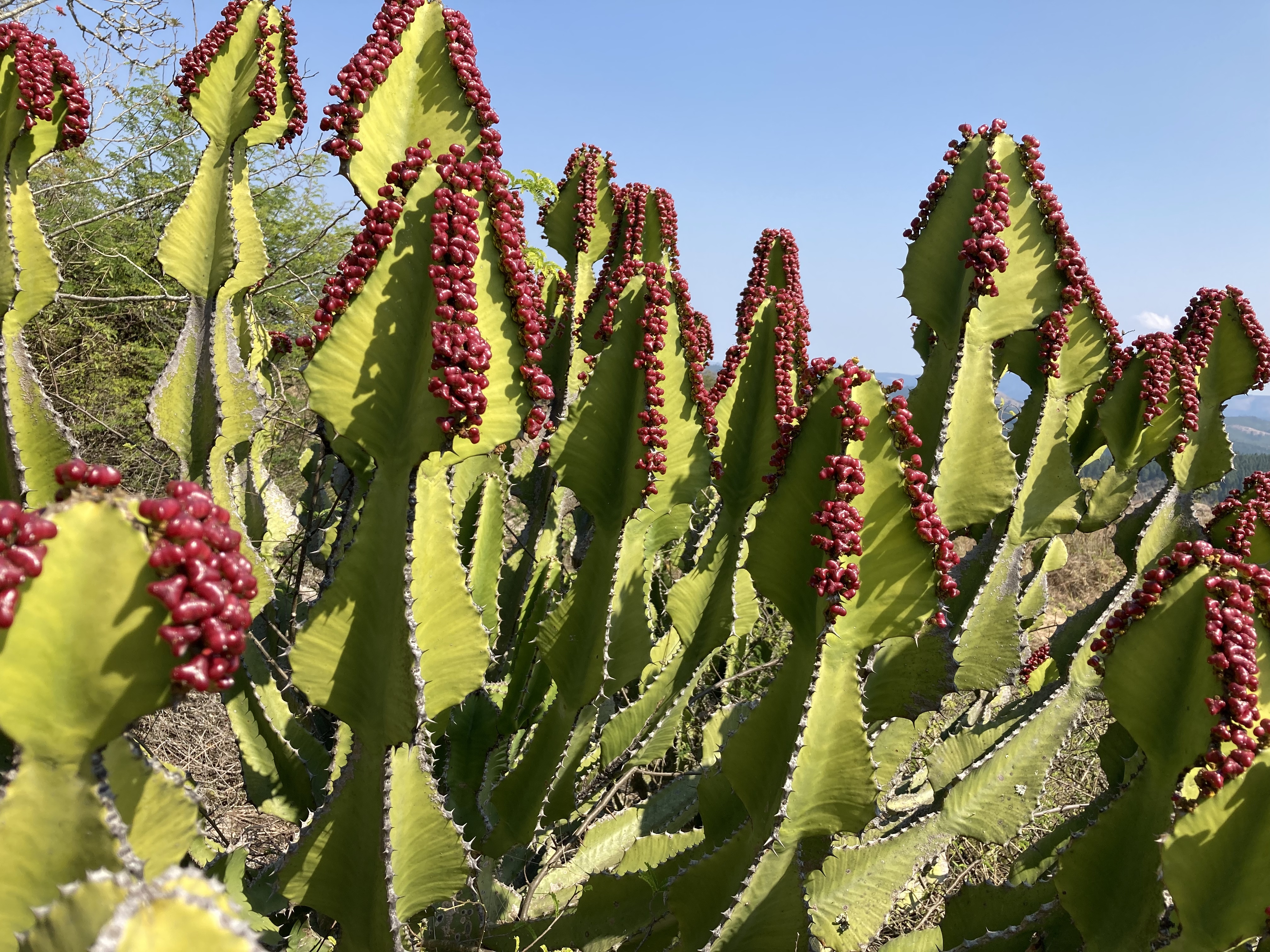
Fruiting Euphorbia ingens in Mpumalanga, South Africa

This tall succulent tree with green round-like branches resembling a balloon is 6–8 meters (20–26 ft) tall. Its trunk is thick. Candelabrum stems have 5 ridges each and are 3.5–7.5 centimeters (1.4–3.0 in) thick. Segmented sprouts are dark-green. Young sprouts have paired spines 0.5–2 millimeters long, often reflected. Small greenish yellow flowers sit on the ridges of the topmost segment. The plant blooms from autumn to winter. A red, round, three-lobed capsule fruit turns purple when ripe. It is found in the savanna in a tropical grasslands biome.

== Habitat ==
The plant occurs in Malawi, Mozambique, Zimbabwe, Zambia, Botswana, Tanzania, South Africa (in the north and east of the country), Rwanda, Uganda, Kenya and Eswatini.

It grows on dry lands and semi-savannas. It prefers warm regions as it can survive long droughts. It usually roots on rocky outcrops or deep in sand among the bush.

== Ecology ==
The plant's flowers are attractive for butterflies, bees and other insects, which pollinate them when gathering pollen and nectar.

Seeds are edible for birds, who also like to make their nests in the branches of these trees. Woodpeckers in particular often use withered segments for this purpose.

== Uses ==
The milky latex of the tree is extremely poisonous and can cause blindness, severe skin irritation and poisoning (when ingested) in humans and animals. However, this plant has been used medicinally as a purgative or for ulcers. Venda and Sotho people use it against cancer.

In South Africa and Zimbabwe candelabra tree stems are also used to poison fish.

Light and solid, the wood is used in door, plank, and boat production.

The candelabra tree is very adaptable and is grown in garden and rockery settings. The plant prefers sun and needs little water. It has few pests due to the toxic latex.

== See also ==
- Euphorbia ammak
