= Piazza dei Signori =

Piazza dei Signori may refer to:

- Piazza dei Signori, Verona
- Piazza dei Signori, Vicenza
- Piazza dei Signori, Treviso
- Piazza dei Signori, Padua
