= Treviso =

Treviso Trevixo (Venetian)
- Comune
- Città di Treviso
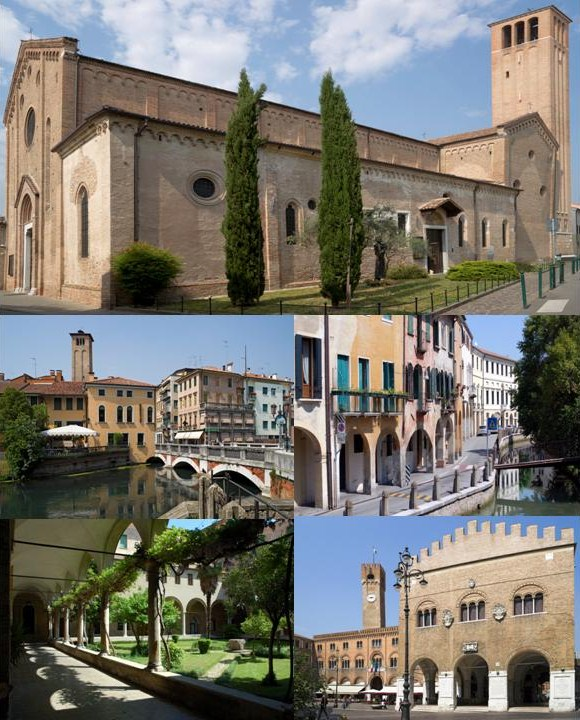
- "Top": Church of San Nicolò; middle: Buranelli Canal and Via Palestro (left to right); "bottom": Cloister of Santa Caterina and Treviso City Hall (left to right).

- Coat of arms

- Location within Italy Location within Veneto
- Coordinates: 45°39′57″N 12°14′44″E
- Country: Italy
- Region: Veneto
- Province: Treviso (TV)
- Frazioni: Monigo, San Paolo, Santa Bona, San Pelajo, Santa Maria del Rovere, Selvana, Fiera, Sant'Antonino, San Lazzaro, Sant'Angelo, San Giuseppe, Canizzano

Government
  - Mayor: Mario Conte (LN)

Area
  - Total: 55.5 km^{2} (21.4 sq mi)
- Elevation: 15 m (49 ft)

Population (31 December 2025)
  - Total: 86,076
  - Density: 1,550/km^{2} (4,020/sq mi)
- Demonym: Trevigiani or Trevisani
- Time zone: UTC+1 (CET)
  - Summer (DST): UTC+2 (CEST)
- Postal code: 31100
- Dialing code: 0422
- ISTAT code: 026086
- Patron saint: St. Liberalis
- Saint day: 27 April
- Website: Official website

Treviso (US: /treɪˈviːzoʊ/ tray-VEE-zoh; Italian: [treˈviːzo]; Venetian: Trevixo [tɾeˈvizo]) is a city and comune (municipality) in the Veneto region of northern Italy. It is the capital of the province of Treviso and the municipality has 86,076 inhabitants (as of December 2025). Some 3,000 live within the Venetian walls (le Mura) or in the historical and monumental center; some 80,000 live in the urban center while the city hinterland has a population of approximately 170,000.

The province is home to the headquarters of clothing retailer Benetton, Sisley, Stefanel, Geox, Diadora and Lotto Sport Italia, appliance maker De'Longhi, and bicycle maker Pinarello.

Treviso is also known for being the original production area of Prosecco wine and radicchio, and is thought to have been the origin of the popular Italian dessert tiramisù.

== Names and etymology ==
The first mention of Treviso, albeit indirect, can be found in the third book of the Naturalis historia by Pliny the Elder, where the "Fluvius Silis ex montibus Tarvisanis" is cited. De vita sancti Martini by Venantius Fortunatus includes the first citation of the toponym "Tarvisus", followed, shortly after, by the Anonymous Ravennate with "Trabision". Numerous are also the references in the Historia Langobardorum by Paul the Deacon: "Tribicium seu Tarbision", "apud Tarvisium" etc. The most probable hypothesis is that Tarvisium, decomposable in Tarv-is-ium, is of Celtic origin: in fact, tarvos "bull" and the formant -is- typical of Gallic toponyms are recognized. Another theory is that it derives from the combination of two Roman terms, Ter- and -visi, in relation to the three hills (in Latin, precisely, visi), corresponding to the current Piazza Duomo, Piazza dei Signori and Piazza Sant'Andrea, on which the city was built.

== History ==
=== Ancient era ===
Some believe that Treviso derived its name from the Celtic word "tarvos" mixed with the Latin ending "isium" forming "Tarvisium", of the tarvos. Tarvos means bull in Celtic mythology, though the same word can relate to the lion, or Leo, in Eastern astrology. Others believe it comes from a word from the language of a tribe who first came to Treviso.

Tarvisium, then a city of the Veneti, became a municipium in 89 BC after the Romans added Cisalpine Gaul to their dominions. Citizens were ascribed to the Roman tribe of Claudia. The city lay in proximity of the Via Postumia, which connected Opitergium to Aquileia, two major cities of Roman Venetia during Ancient and early medieval times. Treviso is rarely mentioned by ancient writers, although Pliny writes of the Silis, that is the Sile River, as flowing ex montibus Tarvisanis.

During the Roman period, Christianity spread to Treviso. Tradition records that St. Prosdocimus, a Greek who had been ordained bishop by St. Peter, brought the Catholic faith to Treviso and surrounding areas. By the 4th century, the Christian population grew sufficient to merit a resident bishop. The first documented bishop was John the Pious who began his episcopacy in 396 AD.

=== Early Middle Ages ===
Treviso went through a demographic and economic decline similar to the rest of Italy after the fall of the Western Empire; however, it was spared by Attila the Hun, and thus, remained an important center during the 6th century. According to tradition, Treviso was the birthplace of Totila, the leader of Ostrogoths during the Gothic Wars. Immediately after the Gothic Wars, Treviso fell under the Byzantine Exarchate of Ravenna until 568 AD when it was taken by the Lombards, who made it one of 36 ducal seats and established an important mint. The latter was especially important during the reign of the last Lombard king, Desiderius, and continued to churn out coins when northern Italy was annexed to the Frankish Empire. People from the city also played a role in the founding of Venice.

Charlemagne made it the capital of a border march, i.e. the Marca Trevigiana, which lasted for several centuries.

=== Middle Ages ===
Treviso joined the Lombard League, and gained independence after the Peace of Constance (1183). This lasted until the rise of the signorial rulers in the towns of northern Italy. In 1214, Treviso was the scene of the Castle of Love that turned into a war between Padua and Venice. Among the various families who ruled over Treviso, the Da Romano reigned from 1237 to 1260. Struggles between Guelph and Ghibelline factions followed, with the first triumphant in 1283 with Gherardo III da Camino, after which Treviso experienced significant economic and cultural growth which continued until 1312. Treviso and its satellite cities, including Castelfranco Veneto (founded by the Trevigiani in contraposition to Padua), had become attractive to neighbouring powers, including the da Carrara and Scaligeri. After the fall of the last Caminesi lord, Rizzardo IV, the Marca was the site of continuous struggles and ravages (1329–1388).

Treviso notary and physician Oliviero Forzetta was an avid collector of antiquities and drawings; the collection was published in a catalog in 1369, the earliest such catalog to survive to this day.

=== Venetian rule ===
After a Scaliger domination in 1329–1339, the city gave itself to the Republic of Venice in consequence of the Scaliger War, becoming the first notable mainland possession of the Serenissima. From 1318 it was also, for a short time, the seat of a university. Venetian rule brought innumerable benefits; however, Treviso necessarily became involved in the wars of Venice. In 1381 the city was given to the duke of Austria, and between 1384 and 1388 it was ruled by the despotic Carraresi. Having returned to Venice, the city was fortified and given a massive line of walls and ramparts, still existing; these were renewed in the following century under the direction of Fra Giocondo, two of the gates being built by the Lombardi. The many waterways were exploited with several waterwheels which mainly powered mills for milling grain produced locally. The waterways were all navigable and "barconi" would arrive from Venice at the Port of Treviso (Porto de Fiera) pay duty and offload their merchandise and passengers along Riviera Santa Margherita. Fishermen were able to bring fresh catch every day to the Treviso fish market, which is held still today on an island connected to the rest of the city by two small bridges at either end.

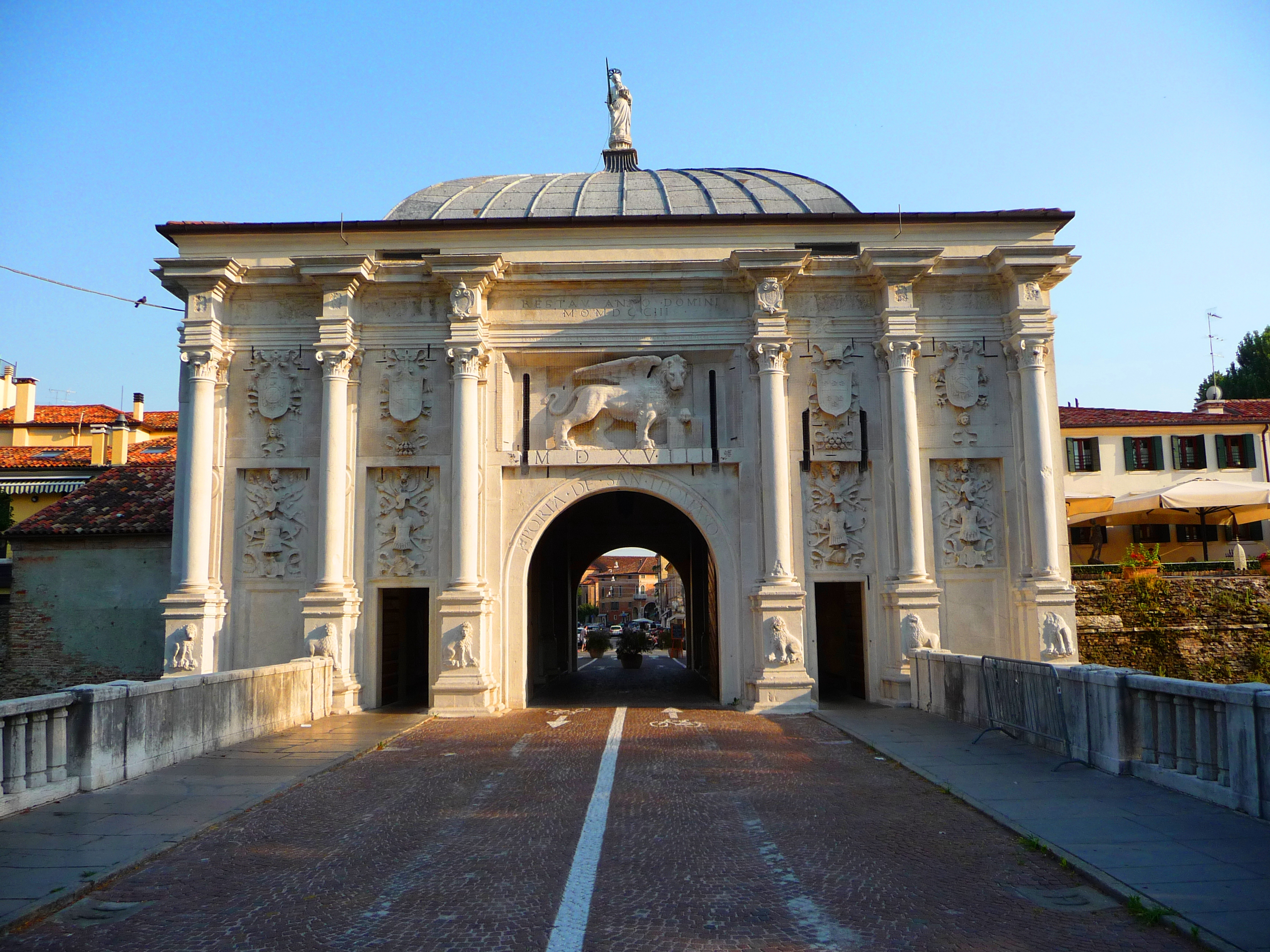
Gate San Tomaso, with the Lion of Saint Mark, emblem of the Venetian Republic

=== French and Austrian rule ===
Treviso was taken in 1797 by the French under Mortier, who was made duke of Treviso. French domination lasted until the defeat of Napoleon, after which it passed to the Austrian Empire. The citizens, still at heart loyal to the fallen Venetian Republic, were displeased with imperial rule and in March 1848, drove out the Austrian garrison. However, after the town was bombarded, the people were compelled to capitulate on the following 14 June. Austrian rule continued until Treviso was annexed with the rest of Veneto to the Kingdom of Italy in 1866.

=== 20th century and later ===
During World War I, Treviso held a strategic position close to the Austrian front. Just north, the Battle of Vittorio Veneto helped turn the tide of the War.

During World War II, one of several Italian concentration camps was established for Slovene and Croatian civilians from the Province of Ljubljana in Monigo, near Treviso. The Monigo camp was disbanded with the Italian capitulation in 1943.

The city suffered several bombing raids during World War II. A large part of the medieval structures of the city center were destroyed—including part of the Palazzo dei Trecento, later rebuilt—causing the death of about 1,600 people.

In January 2005, a bomb enclosed in a candy egg and attributed to the so-called Italian Unabomber detonated on a Treviso street.

== Geography ==
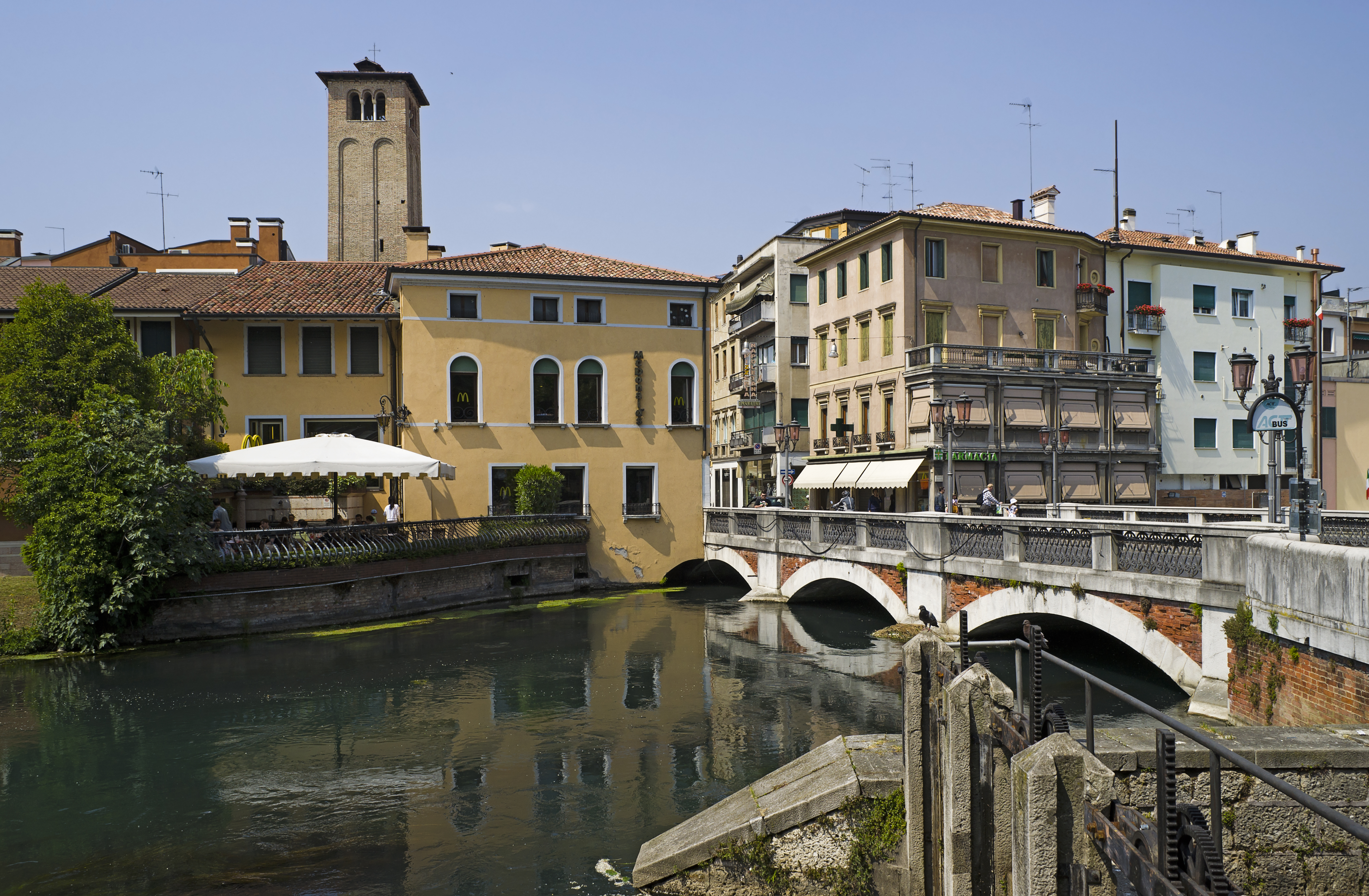
A bridge on the Sile river in Treviso

Treviso stands at the confluence of Botteniga with the Sile, 30 kilometres (19 miles) north of Venice, 50 km (31 mi) east of Vicenza, 40 km (25 mi) north-east of Padua, and 120 km (75 mi) south of Cortina d'Ampezzo. The city is situated some 15 km (9 mi) south-west the right bank of the Piave River, on the plain between the Gulf of Venice and the Alps.

=== Climate ===
Climate in Treviso has mild differences between highs and lows, and has adequate rainfall year-round. The Köppen Climate Classification subtype for this climate is "Cfa" (temperate Humid subtropical climate).

Climate data for Treviso (Treviso Airport) (1991–2020)
Month	Jan	Feb	Mar	Apr	May	Jun	Jul	Aug	Sep	Oct	Nov	Dec	Year
Record high °C (°F)	16.3 (61.3)	22.3 (72.1)	24.6 (76.3)	31.6 (88.9)	33.4 (92.1)	38.5 (101.3)	37.4 (99.3)	40.0 (104.0)	33.0 (91.4)	28.0 (82.4)	24.6 (76.3)	16.5 (61.7)	40.0 (104.0)
Mean daily maximum °C (°F)	7.9 (46.2)	10.2 (50.4)	14.7 (58.5)	18.9 (66.0)	23.7 (74.7)	27.7 (81.9)	30.2 (86.4)	30.1 (86.2)	25.0 (77.0)	19.1 (66.4)	13.4 (56.1)	8.8 (47.8)	19.2 (66.6)
Daily mean °C (°F)	3.3 (37.9)	5.0 (41.0)	9.3 (48.7)	13.4 (56.1)	18.4 (65.1)	22.4 (72.3)	24.6 (76.3)	24.3 (75.7)	19.3 (66.7)	14.2 (57.6)	9.1 (48.4)	4.2 (39.6)	14.0 (57.2)
Mean daily minimum °C (°F)	−0.3 (31.5)	0.6 (33.1)	4.5 (40.1)	8.3 (46.9)	13.1 (55.6)	17.1 (62.8)	19.1 (66.4)	18.9 (66.0)	14.4 (57.9)	10.1 (50.2)	5.5 (41.9)	0.8 (33.4)	9.3 (48.7)
Record low °C (°F)	−9.6 (14.7)	−11.0 (12.2)	−8.0 (17.6)	−2.0 (28.4)	1.6 (34.9)	0.0 (32.0)	9.9 (49.8)	9.0 (48.2)	−2.6 (27.3)	−2.2 (28.0)	−5.2 (22.6)	−11.4 (11.5)	−11.4 (11.5)
Average precipitation mm (inches)	45.2 (1.78)	50.9 (2.00)	60.0 (2.36)	76.3 (3.00)	99.2 (3.91)	83.0 (3.27)	71.9 (2.83)	73.0 (2.87)	97.7 (3.85)	78.0 (3.07)	94.2 (3.71)	63.9 (2.52)	893.3 (35.17)
Average precipitation days (≥ 1.0 mm)	5.4	5.2	5.8	8.5	9.1	8.2	6.9	6.6	6.9	6.8	8.4	6.4	84.2
Average relative humidity (%)	77.6	73.8	70.5	70.1	69.8	69.5	68.0	68.1	70.6	75.7	79.1	78.7	72.6
Average dew point °C (°F)	0.2 (32.4)	0.7 (33.3)	4.0 (39.2)	7.8 (46.0)	12.4 (54.3)	16.2 (61.2)	17.9 (64.2)	17.8 (64.0)	14.1 (57.4)	10.6 (51.1)	6.1 (43.0)	1.4 (34.5)	9.1 (48.4)
Mean monthly sunshine hours	153.8	166.9	196.2	200.1	245.8	248.1	293.6	260.4	204.9	166.5	132.0	151.3	2,419.5
Source: NOAA

== Architecture ==
- The Late Romanesque–Early Gothic church of San Francesco, built by the Franciscan community in 1231–1270. Used by Napoleonic troops as a stable, it was reopened in 1928. The interior has a single nave with five chapels. On the left wall is a Romanesque-Byzantine fresco portraying St. Christopher (later 13th century). The Grand Chapel has a painting of the Four Evangelists by a pupil of Tommaso da Modena, to whom is instead directly attributed a fresco of Madonna with Child and Seven Saints (1350) in the first chapel on the left. The next chapel has instead a fresco with Madonna and Four Saints from 1351 by the so-called Master of Feltre. The church, among others, houses the tombs of Pietro Alighieri, son of Dante, and Francesca Petrarca, daughter of the poet Francesco.
- The Loggia dei Cavalieri, an example of Treviso's Romanesque influenced by Byzantine forms. It was built under the podestà Andrea da Perugia (1276) as a place for meetings, talks and games, although reserved only to the higher classes.
- Piazza dei Signori (Lords' Square), with the Palazzo di Podestà (later 15th century).
- Church of San Nicolò, a mix of 13th-century Venetian Romanesque and French Gothic elements. The interior has a nave and two aisles, with five apsed chapels. It houses important frescoes by Tommaso da Modena, depicting St Romuald, St Agnes and the Redemptor and St Jerome in his Study. Also the Glorious Mysteries of Santo Peranda can be seen. Noteworthy is also the fresco of St Christopher on the eastern side of the church, which is the most ancient depiction in glass in Europe.
- Cathedral is dedicated to St Peter. It was once a small church built in the Late Roman era, to which later were added a crypt and the Santissimo and Malchiostro Chapels (1520). After the numerous later restorations, only the gate remains of the original Roman edifice. The interior houses works by Il Pordenone and Titian (Malchiostro Annunciation) among others. The edifice has seven domes, five over the nave and two closing the chapels.
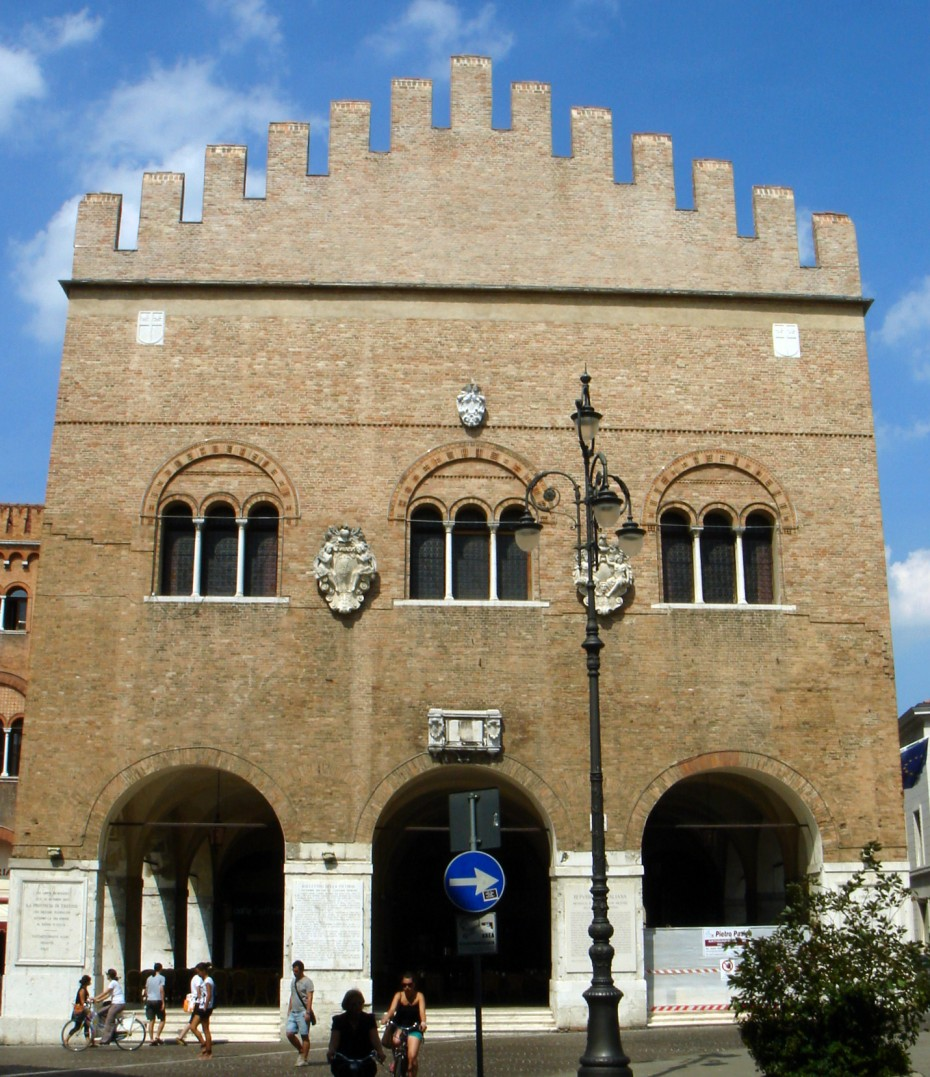
- Palazzo dei Trecento

Palazzo dei Trecento, built in the 13th–14th centuries.

- Piazza Rinaldi. It is the seat of three palaces of the Rinaldi family, the first built in the 12th century after their flight from Frederick Barbarossa. The second, with unusual ogival arches in the loggia of the first floor, is from the 15th century. The third was added in the 18th century.
- Ponte di Pria (Stone Bridge), along the city walls, where River Botteniga divides into the three channels that cross the city center (Cagnan Grande, Cagnan di Mezzo, Roggia).
- Monte di Pietà di Treviso and the Cappella dei Rettori. The Monte di Pietà was founded to house Jewish moneylenders. On the second floor is the Cappella dei Rettori, a lay hall for meetings, with frescoes by il Pozzoserrato.
- Teatro Mario Del Monaco, the main theatre and opera house of the city. It was built in 1869 to designs by Andrea Scala which kept the theatre's original facade. The internal decorations were by the painter Federico Andreotti and the sculptor Fausto Asteo.
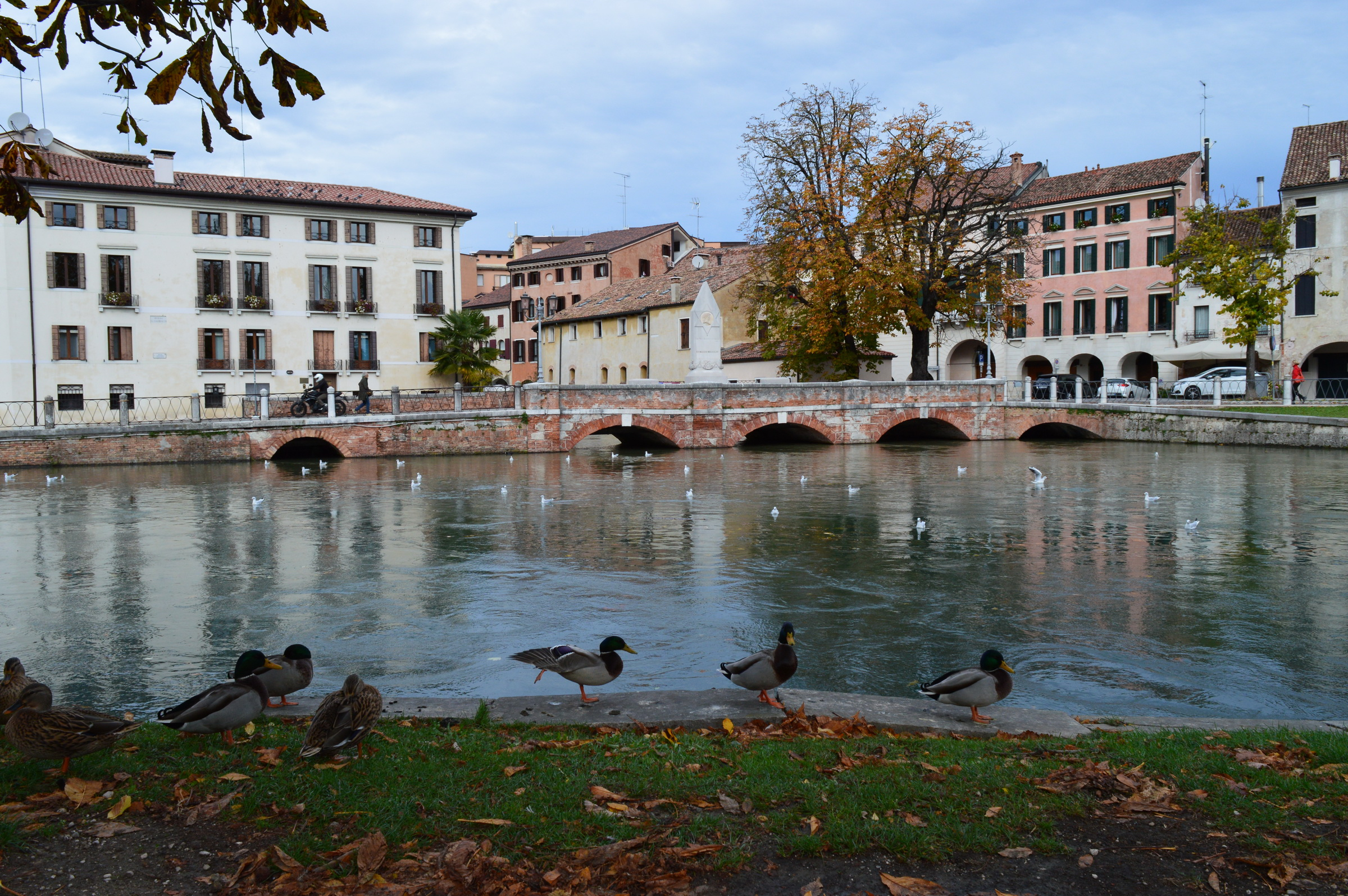
- Dante Bridge in Treviso
  Ponte Dante (Dante Bridge) crosses the narrow Cagnan river at the point where it flows into the Sile. This place was mentioned by Dante Alighieri in the third part of the Divine Comedy ("Paradise"). The bridge was named after the great Italian poet in 1865.

== Parks and gardens ==
- Giardino Fenologico "Alessandro Marcello"
- Orto Botanico Conservativo Carlo Spegazzini, a botanical garden
- Orto Botanico Conservativo Francesco Busnello, another botanical garden

== Education ==
=== Universities ===
As early as 1231 the city was looking for a doctor able to teach a course in Treviso, but it was not until 1269 that the canon Florio de' Dovari of Cremona was appointed, probably the first professor of law. In 1313–1314, it is recorded that the municipality guaranteed the presence of two Law professors, an ordinary and an extraordinary one, a third professor to teach Canonic Law and a fourth to teach medicine. Even though the city had its own university in the Middle Ages, only in recent times the University of Padua, Ca' Foscari and the IUAV of Venice established their own university campuses, giving once again the status of "university city" to Treviso. Classes are held at the former hospital of Battuti and the former Military District. In 2015 the University IUAV of Venice closed its campuses in Treviso, moving its degree courses to Venice.

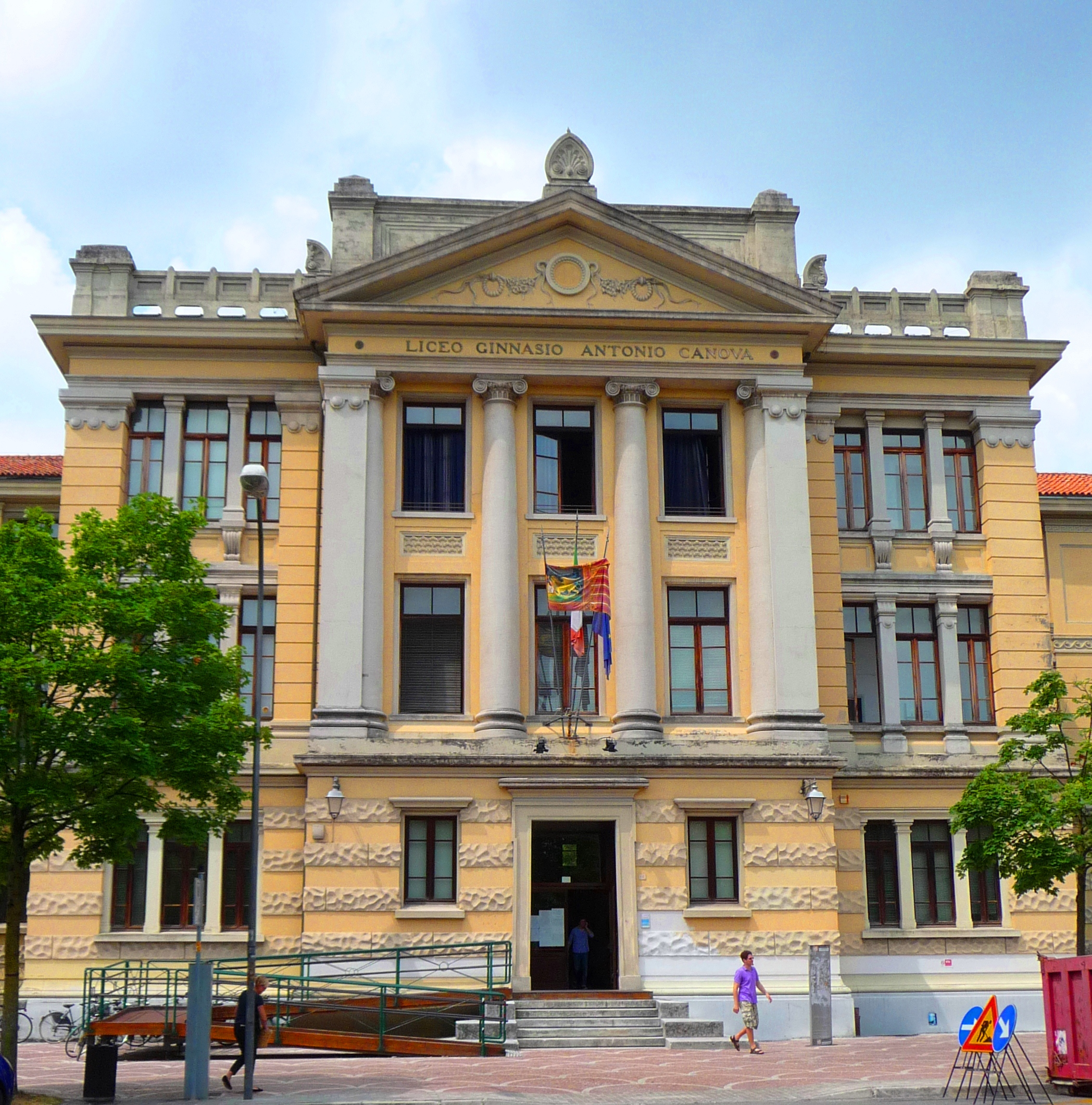
Liceo Canova in Treviso

=== High schools ===
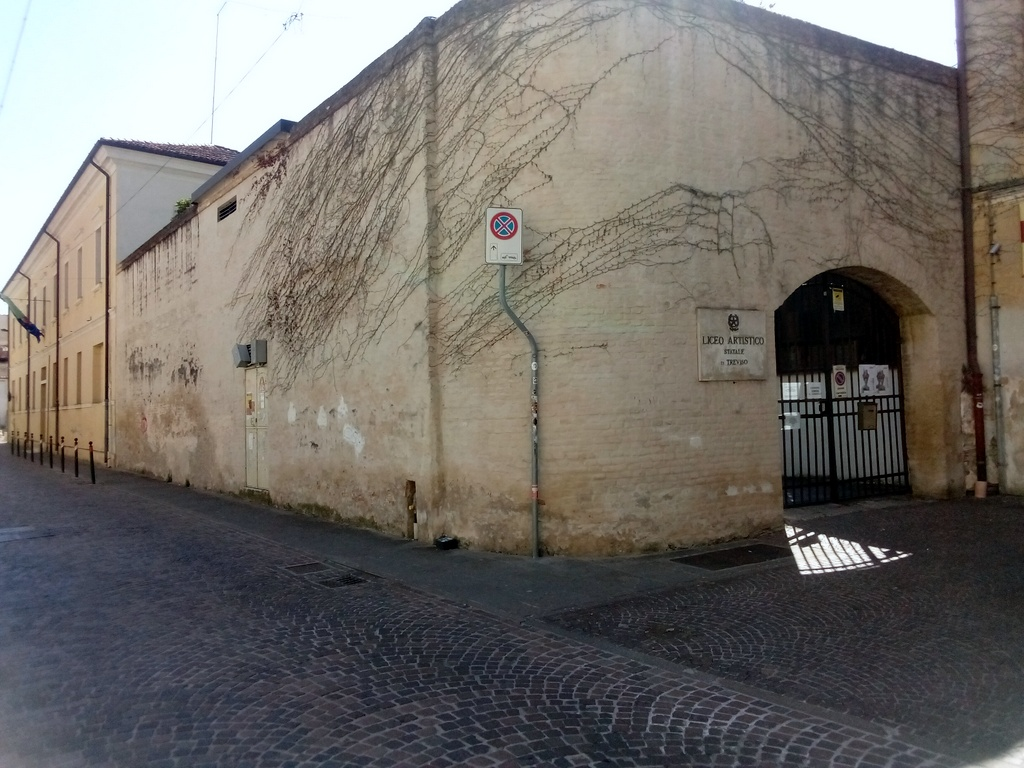
Liceo Artistico in Treviso

In Treviso there are several high schools. There is the "Liceo ginnasio statale Antonio Canova" institute that includes the classical and linguistic high school, the "Liceo duca degli abruzzi" institute that includes the scientific lyceum, the linguistic lyceum and the human and social sciences lyceum, as well as "Liceo Artistico statale" with courses focusing on the study and practice of the arts (painting, sculpture, design, architecture, audiovisuals and multimedia).

In the northern area of Treviso, in the Lancenigo di Villorba district there is the "Max Plank" school institute with computer science, electronics, automation courses.

There is also no shortage of private schools in the city such as the "collegio vescovile Pio X", or the "Istituto Canossiano Madonna del Grappa", which includes a sports science high school.

== Culture ==
=== Libraries ===
The public library has five locations, three of which are located in the city center. There are also some private foundations, such as the documentation center of the Fondazione Benetton Studi e Ricerche with a library annex, at Palazzo Caotorta, the Biblioteca Capitolare and the Biblioteca del Seminario. The Liceo Canova also has an interesting library on the ground floor of its main headquarters, in Via San Teonisto.

=== Museums ===
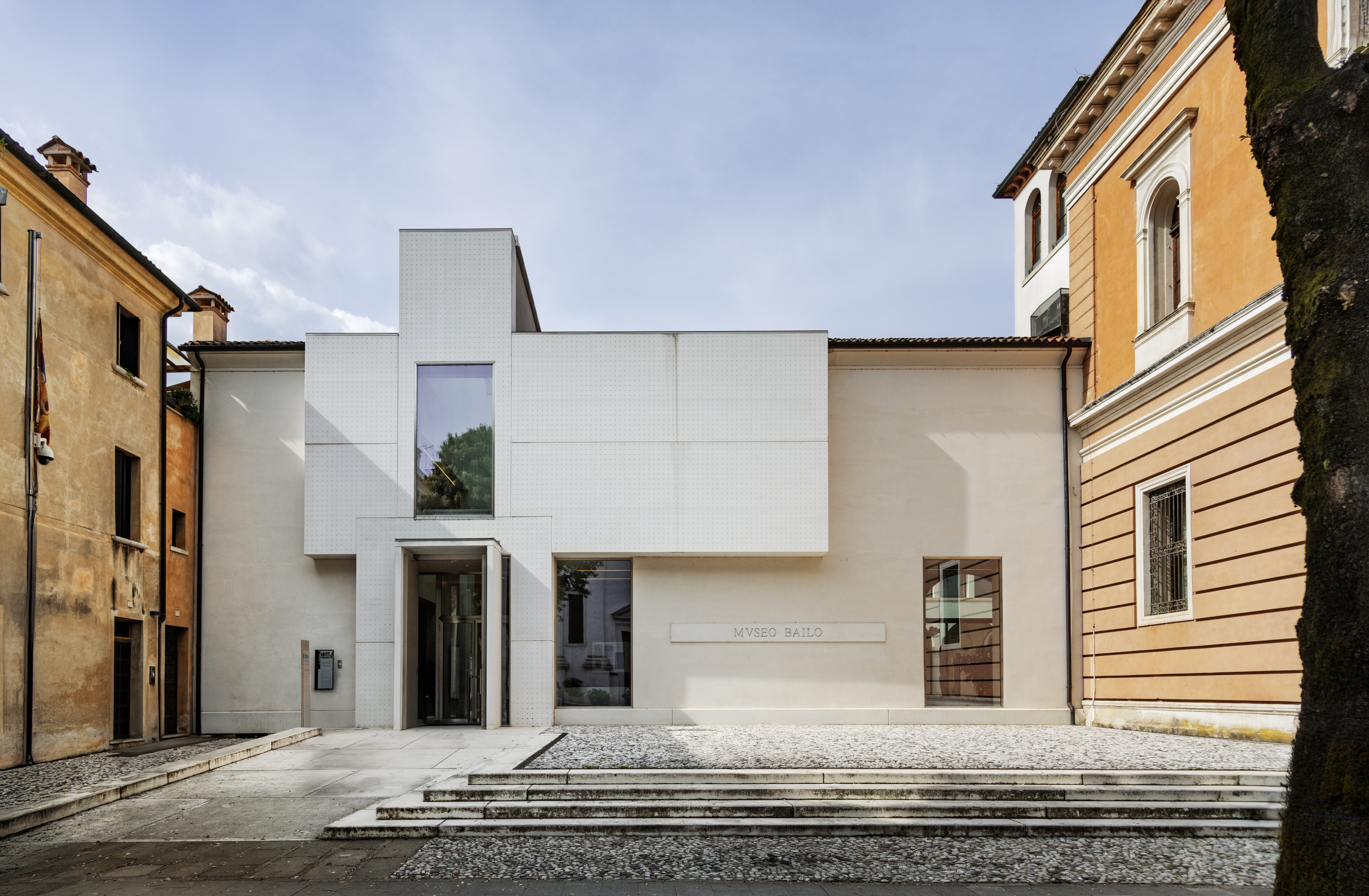
Bailo Museum in Treviso

In addition to various museums, the city also offers important exhibition areas such as Palazzo dei Trecento, the city council's headquarters, Ca' dei Carraresi, owned by the Fondazione Cassamarca, and Palazzo Bomben, the headquarters of the Fondazione Benetton Studi e Ricerche.

- The Civic Museums, inaugurated in 1879 with the name of Museo Trivigiano (Trivigiano Museum), are today divided into three locations: the Bailo Museum, which reopened in autumn 2015 after a renovation initiated in 2003 and named after Luigi Bailo, the founder and first curator; the Santa Caterina complex; the Ca' da Noal complex, Casa Robegan and Casa Karwath, acquired in 1935 by the municipality. The various sections preserve artifacts found in the city itself or in the surrounding areas, dating from the second millennium BC. to the Early Middle Ages, works of art from the Renaissance to the twentieth century (Giovanni Bellini, Paris Bordone, Lorenzo Lotto, Tiziano, Rosalba Carriera, Giambattista and Giandomenico Tiepolo, Francesco Guardi, Pietro Longhi, Medoro Coghetto, Sante Cancian, Guglielmo Ciardi, Arturo Martini, Francesco Podesti, Gino Rossi).
- Museo nazionale Collezione Salce, inaugurated in 2017, contains the collection of posters by Nando Salce, donated to the state at his death in 1962, and now kept at the Santa Margherita Complex, while the museum seat is the Complex of San Gaetano, which displays in rotation the graphic materials in temporary exhibitions.
- Ethnographic Provincial Museum, inaugurated in 2002 and set up in the rural architectural complex of the Piavone Houses, whose original nucleus dates back to the late seventeenth century, is located within the Natural Park of the Storga River, on the northern outskirts of Treviso. The various buildings, restored and transformed into a multifunctional structure, are also home to the Treviso Folk Group, dedicated to the protection and the promotion of the local culture.
- Diocesan Museum, inaugurated in 1988, the museum is housed in the building commonly called the Old Canons (12th century), the ancient seat of the canons of the Cathedral of Saint Peter the Apostle.
- Museums of the Episcopal Seminary, in the suppressed Dominican convent annexed to the Church of San Nicolò, seat since 1840 of the Episcopal Seminary, where there are the collections of the Zoological Museum named after Giuseppe Scarpa, doctor in Natural Science who donated in 1914 his own animal collection, and the Ethnographic Museum of the Venezuelan Indios (Piaroa, Makiritare, Panare, Warao and Motilon), founded thanks to the contribution of the priest Dino Grossa.

=== Cuisine ===
Going in order, the most typical appetizer is the soppressa, a soft cured meat cut into thick slices, usually accompanied by polenta and radicchio. Among the first courses, the "risi" (with liver or accompanied by seasonal vegetables such as asparagus, radicchio, peas or "bisi"...) and soups (in particular the simple capon broth with tortellini, the bean soup and the sopa coada) can be mentioned. As for the main course, feathered game and poultry stand out: roasted guinea fowl with "pevarada" (a sauce made with liver and anchovy paste), boiled chicken, goose (often seasoned with celery), spit roasted duck and capon stew.

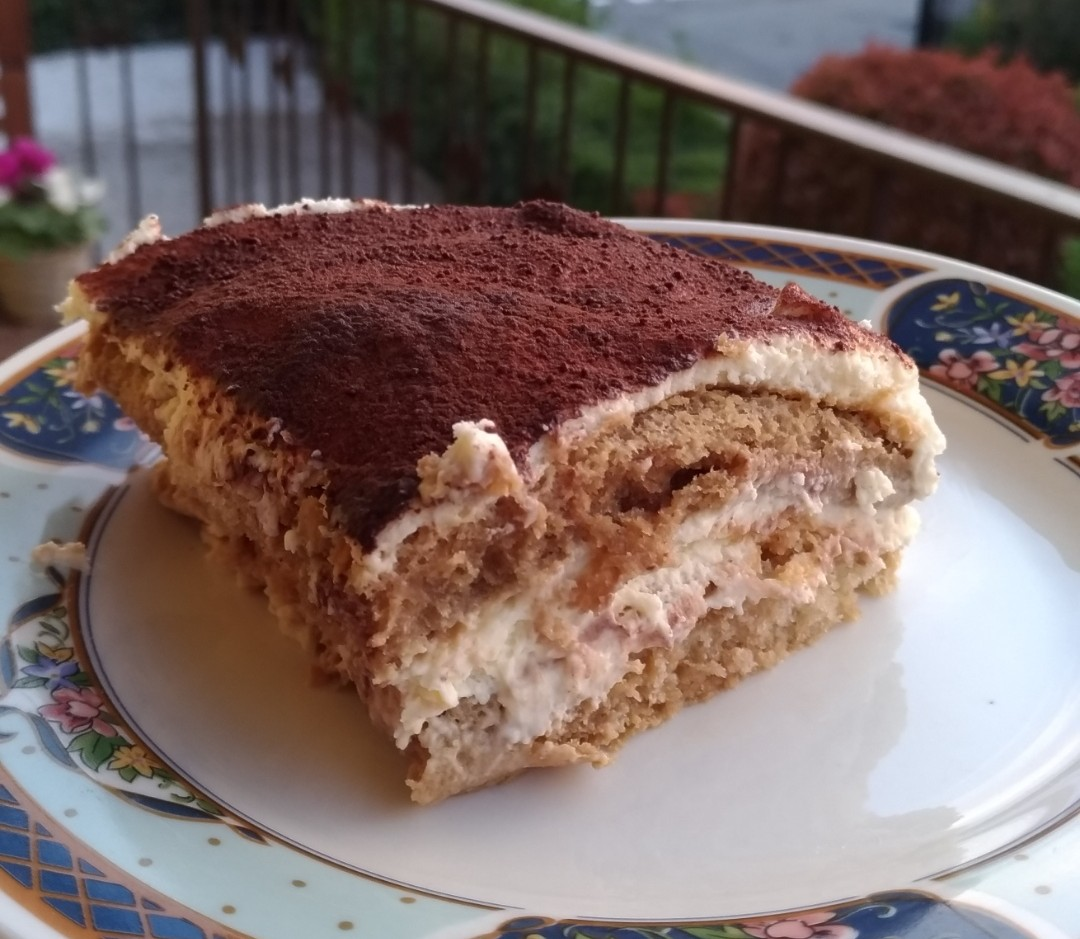
Tiramisù, a typical dessert from Treviso

There is also fresh-water fish and in particular eel, "bisatto" in dialect, fried or stewed with polenta, fresh-water shrimp, trout and codfish (in Treviso and in the Triveneto commonly called "baccalà"). Even vegetables are often protagonists of the Trevisan table, and in particular, the famous Red Radicchio of Treviso. Although the province is rich in cheeses (Montasio, Asiago, Taleggio, Morlacco), the most typical is perhaps the soft Casatella of Treviso, a fresh cheese with protected designation of origin status prepared with pasteurized cow's milk.

Among the most cultivated fruits in the province are the Marrone of Combai, cherries, especially from the Hills of Asolo, and grapes. The most characteristic dessert is definitely the Tiramisù, which according to the tradition was prepared for the first time in the restaurant "Alle Beccherie". Other desserts that can be cited are the "Fregolotta" cake and seasonal desserts such as frittelle, crostoli and castagnole for Carnival, the Easter "fugassa con le mandorle", the Favette dei Morti. The most famous white wine is certainly Prosecco, and in addition to it, the Tocai, the Verduzzo and those made with white, grey Pinot and Chardonnay grapes as far as white wines are concerned and Cabernet, Merlot, Pinot noir and Raboso as far as red wines are concerned.

== Economy ==
In Treviso, artisanal production of ceramics and porcelain is widespread, as well as the processing of straw and wicker. In Treviso, in the past, Dal Negro, a company producing playing cards, was founded and had its headquarters there. Currently, in this city there is an Osram factory and the headquarters of De'Longhi. Furthermore, in Treviso and its province, some of the most famous Italian wines are produced, such as Prosecco, Cabernet, Tocai, Merlot, Raboso and other well-known varieties.

Treviso is also known worldwide for its textile and luxury production. Companies such as Benetton, Geox, it:Pasta Zara, Stefanel and Sisley are based in this area.

In 2025, the BBC proposed Treviso as a "smarter alternative" to Venice for international travellers, given the more famous city's overwhelming tourist numbers at the time.

== Sports ==
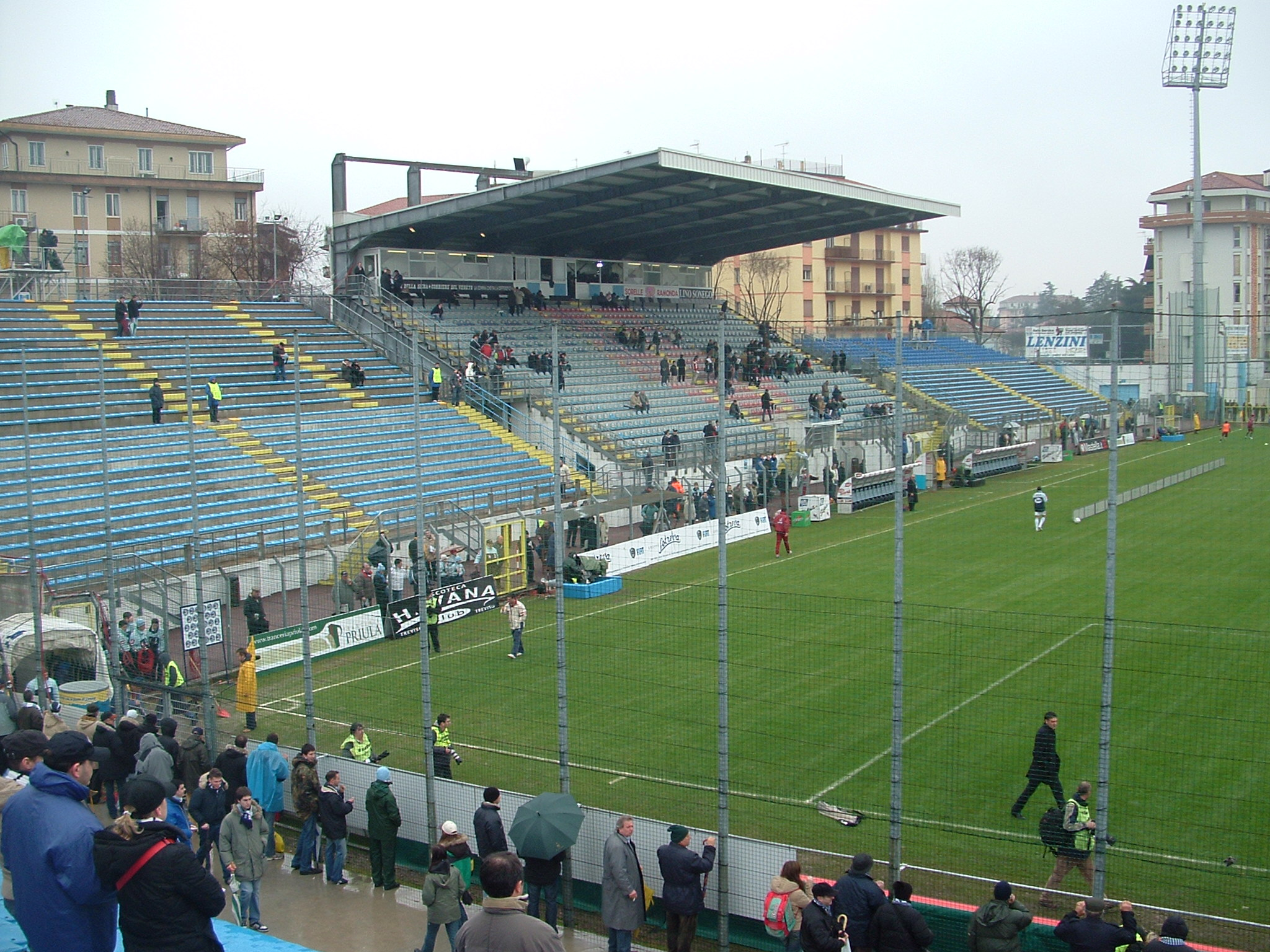
Internal view of the Tenni Stadium

Treviso is home to several notable Italian sport teams, thanks to the presence of the Benetton family, who owns and sponsors:

- Sisley Treviso (volleyball), winner of 9 scudetti, playing at the Palaverde.

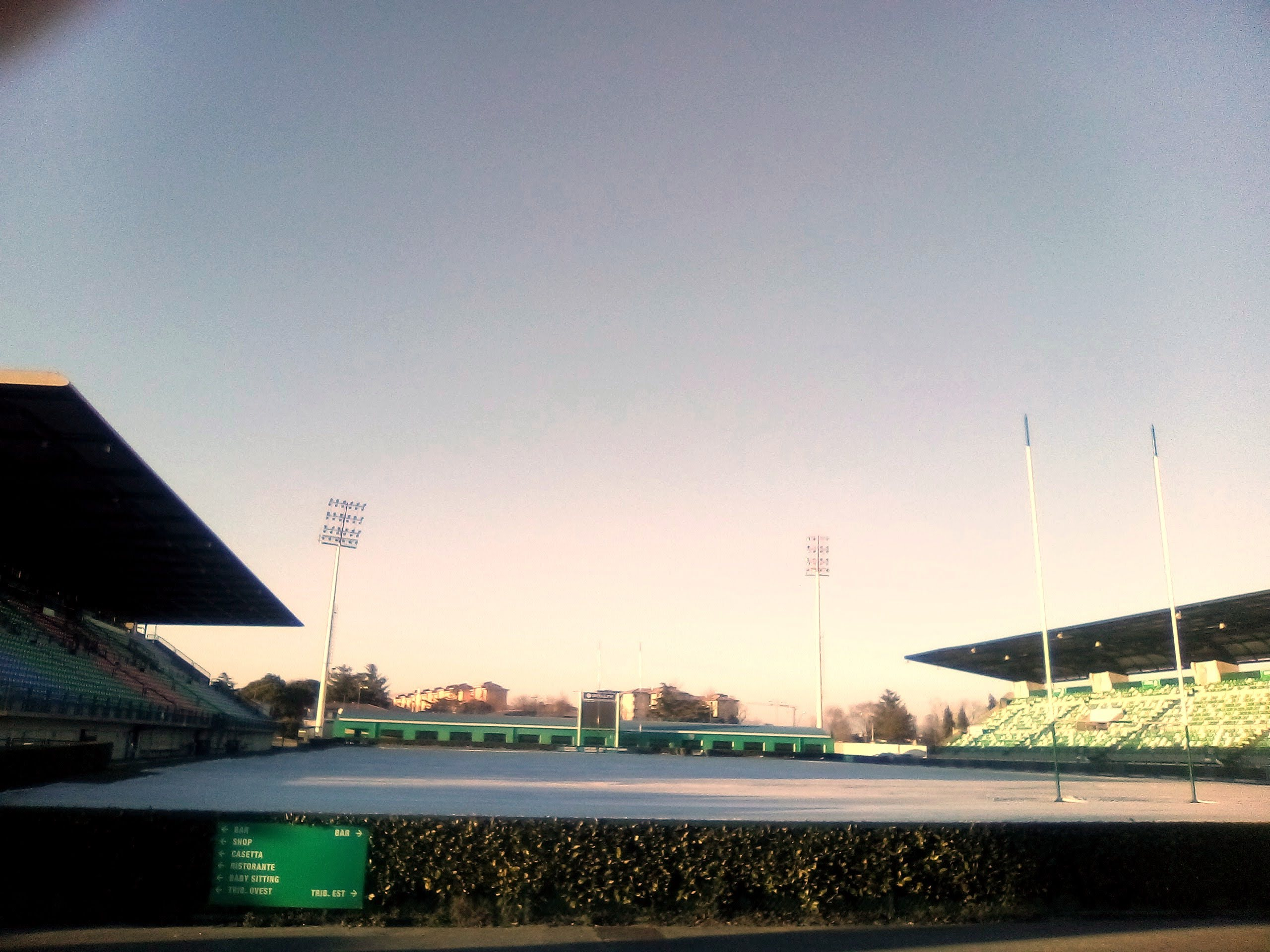
Monigo rugby stadium

- Benetton (rugby union), winner of 15 scudetti, playing at the Monigo stadium. Benetton is one of two Italian teams that compete in the URC, alongside existing teams from Ireland, Scotland, Wales and South Africa.
- Benetton Basket, winner of 5 scudetti, playing at the Palaverde.

The local football team, A.S.D. Treviso 2009, played for the first time in the Italian Serie A in 2005. Its home stadium is the Omobono Tenni.

Treviso is a popular stop on the professional cyclo-cross racing circuit and served as the site of the 2008 UCI Cyclo-cross World Championships.

Treviso is a popular area for cycling enthusiasts. From the city center there is an cycling path along the Sile river with connecting paths all the way to Jesolo, a seaside resort on the Adriatic sea. For road cyclists, Treviso is also a starting/finishing point for tours to the Montello hill and further into the hills of the area around Conegliano and Valdobbiadene.

== Transportation ==
=== Rail transport ===
Treviso Centrale railway station has Trenitalia trains to Rome, Milan, Venice, Padua, Trieste. The station also has Austrian trains (ÖBB) going to Vienna, Klagenfurt, Villach.

=== Air transport ===
Treviso Airport is located about 5 kilometers west-southwest of Treviso and approximately 31 kilometers from Venice. It's a smaller airport primarily used by low-cost airlines, with Ryanair being one of the main operators. The airport has a single asphalt runway, 2,420 meters long, and it stands 18 meters above sea level. The terminal was opened in 2007 and named after the famous Italian sculptor Antonio Canova. The nearest major airport is Venice Marco Polo Airport, located 30 km (19 mi) south east which is a half an hour drive from Treviso.

=== Local transport ===
MOM is the major transport company in the city and provides for urban and suburban services in the Province of Treviso.

== Notable people ==
- Baduila (ruled 541–552), Ostrogothic king.
- Pope Benedict XI (1240–1304).
- Antonio Canova (1757–1822), Neoclassical sculptor.
- Girolamo da Treviso (1498–1544), renaissance sculptor and painter
- Paris Bordone (1500–1570), painter of the Venetian Renaissance.
- Luciano Benetton (born 1935), chairman of the Benetton Group.
- Gloria Aura Bortolini (born 1982), journalist, photographer and filmmaker.
- Juti Ravenna (1897–1972), painter.
- Giovanni Battista Piranesi (1720–1778), architect and artist.
- Pierre Cardin (1922–2020), fashion designer.
- Giuliano Carmignola (born 1951), violinist.
- Alessandro Del Piero (born 1974), footballer.
- Francesco Tullio Altan (born 1942), professionally known as Altan, comics artist and satirist.
- Pomponio Amalteo (1505–1588), painter.
- Giovanni Comisso (1895–1969), writer.
- Cesco Baseggio (1897–1971), stage, film and television actor.
- Carlo Nordio (born 1947), magistrate, current italian Minister of Justice.
- Emma Ciardi (1879–1933), painter.
- Giovanni Pinarello (1922–2014), cyclist and founder of the Cicli Pinarello.
- Matteo Tagliariol (1983), épée fencer.
- Angelo Ephrikian (1913–1982), musicologist and violinist.
- Laura Efrikian (born 1940), actress and television personality.
- Red Canzian (born 1951), musical artist, vocalist and bassist of the Italian band Pooh.
- Leonora Fani (born 1954), film actress.
- Andrea Bruno Mazzocato (born 1948), Roman Catholic prelate.
- Mario Conte (born 1979), politician, current mayor of Treviso.
- Elsa Vazzoler (1920–1989), actress.
- Davide Carraro (born 1977), Roman Catholic Bishop
- Aldo Serena (born 1960), former professional .footballer.
- Andrea Lucchetta (born 1962), volleyball player.
- Giuseppe Moro (1921–1974), footballer.
- Arturo Martini (1889–1947), sculptor.
- Giovanni Masutto (1830–1894), musicologist and flautist.
- Andrea Zanzotto (1921–2011), poet.
- Alessandra Basso (born 1967), lawyer and politician.
- Marius Mitrea, (born 1982), rugby union referee.
- Marco Paolini (born 1956), stage actor.
- Giuseppe De'Longhi (born 1939), billionaire businessman.
- Diletta Rizzo Marin (born 1984), opera singer and model.
- Antonino Rocca (1921–1977), professional wrestler with the WWE he was the WWF International Heavyweight Championship 1959–1963.
- Simone Tempestini (born 1994), Romanian rally driver.
- Bianca Rossi (born 1954), basketball player.

== International relations ==
=== Twin towns – Sister cities ===
Treviso is twinned with:

- Orléans, France
- Timișoara, Romania
- Curitiba, Brazil
- Neuquén, Argentina
- Griffith, Australia
- Guelph, Canada
- Érd, Hungary

== Gallery ==
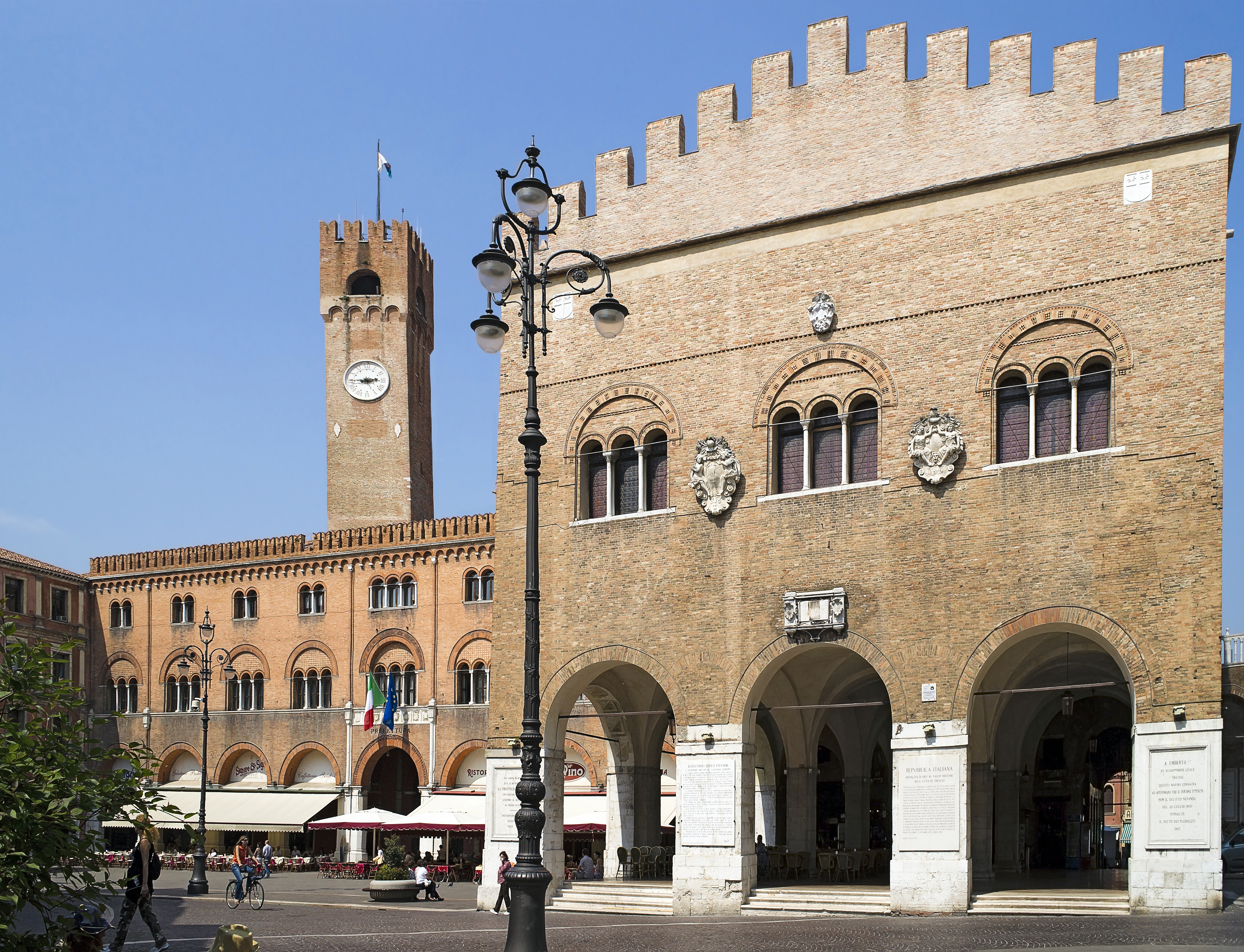
Piazza dei Signori and Palazzo dei Trecento

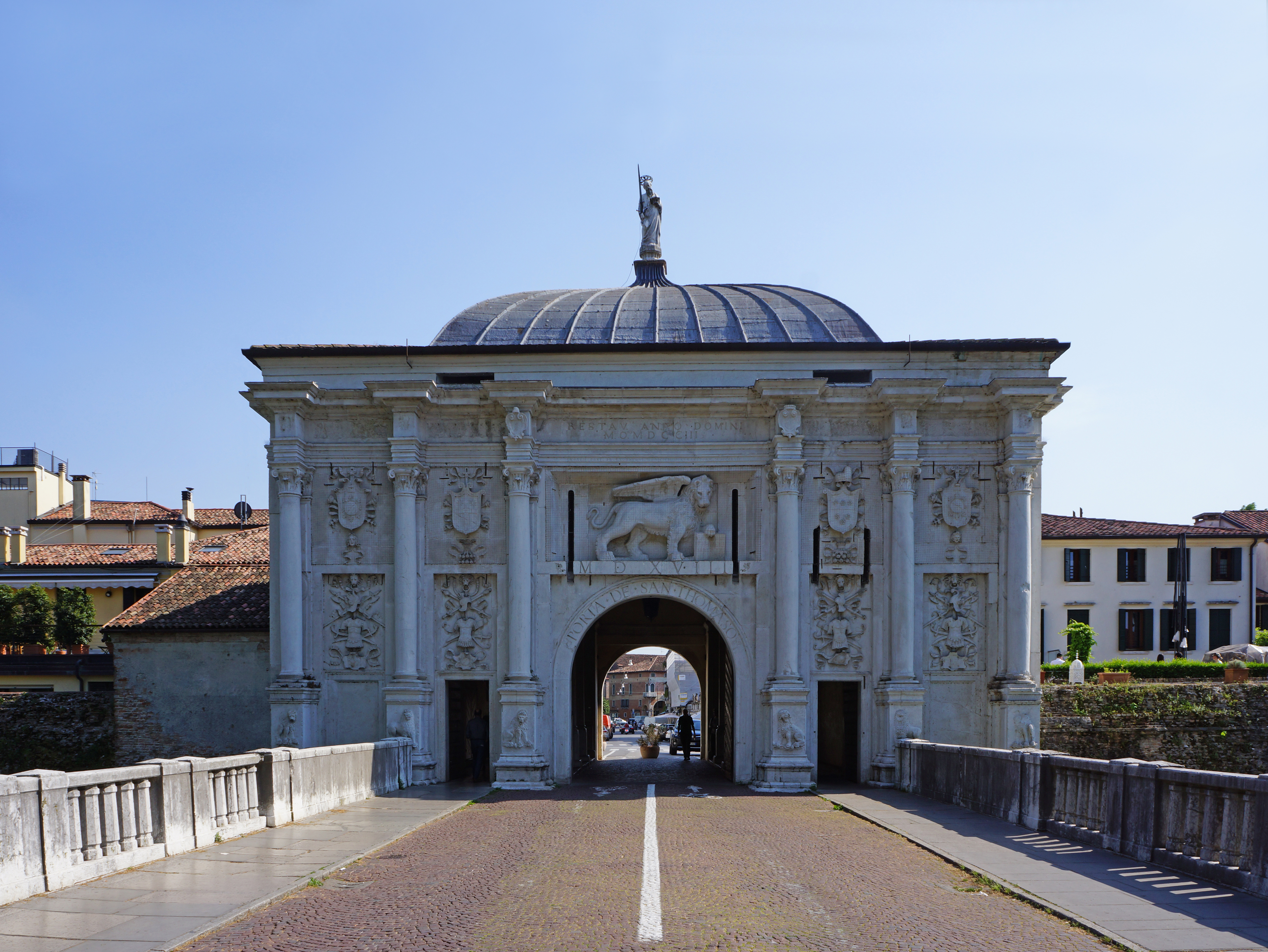
Porta San Tommaso

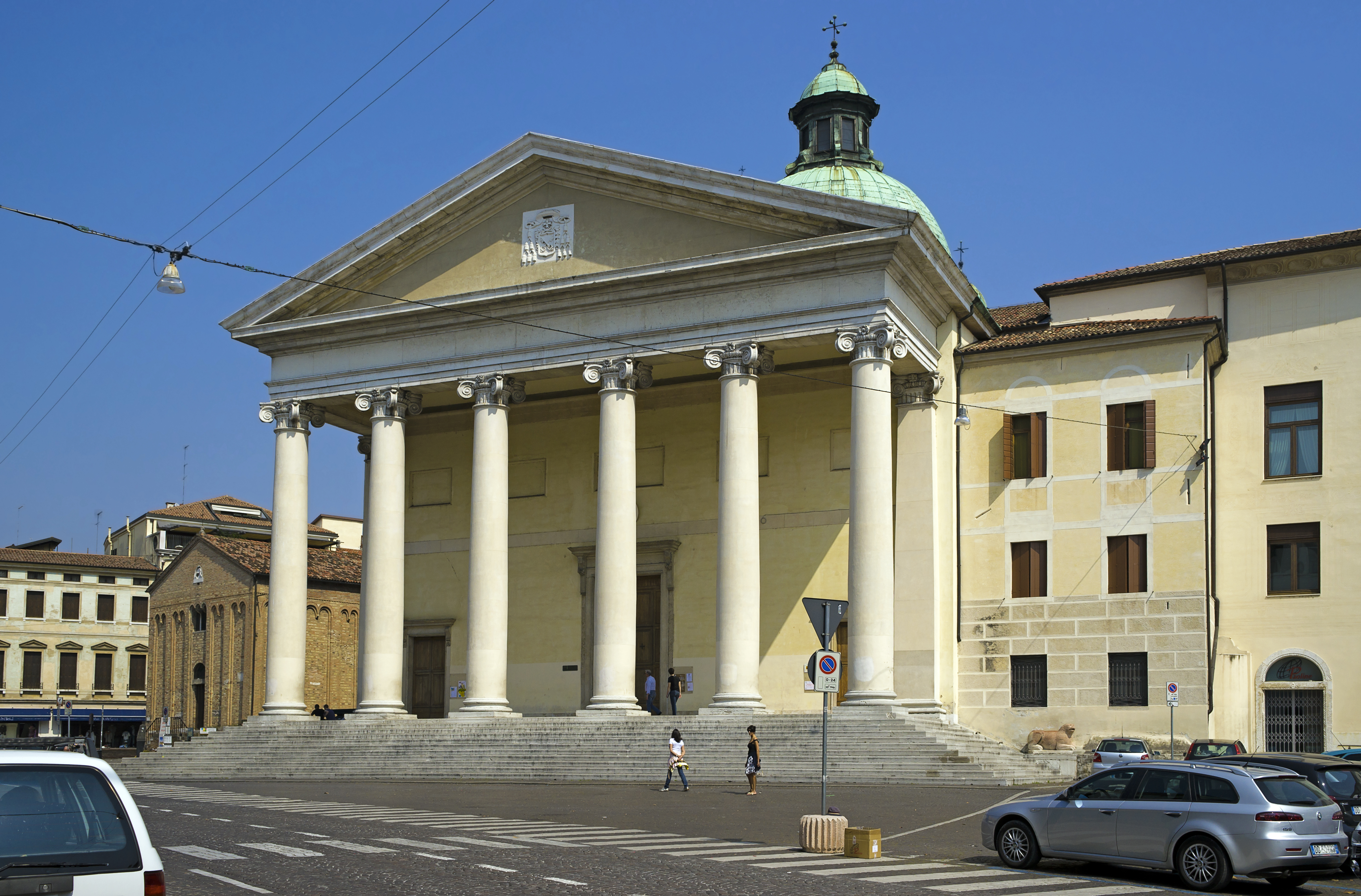
Facade of Treviso cathedral

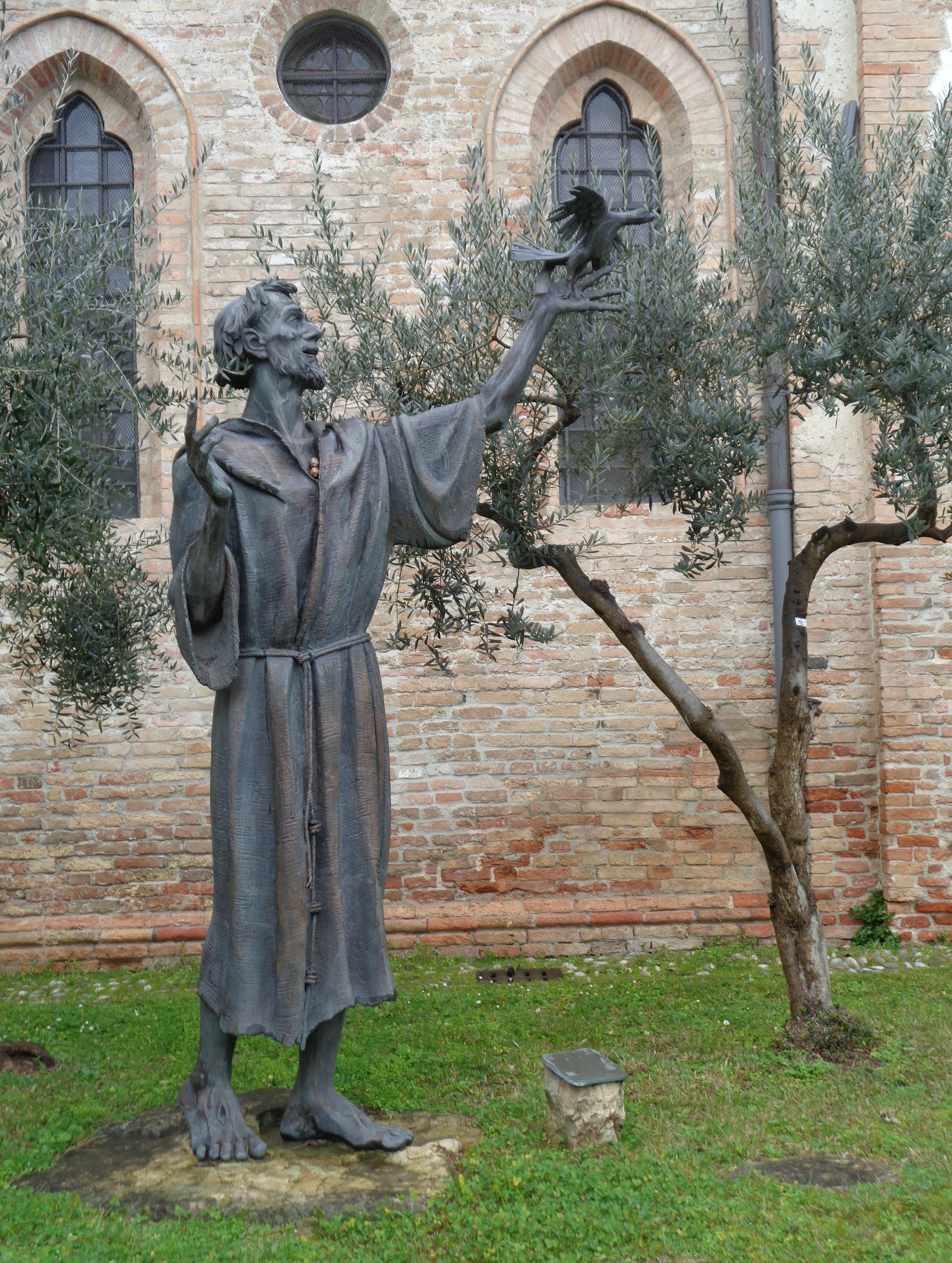
Statue of St. Francis in the historic center

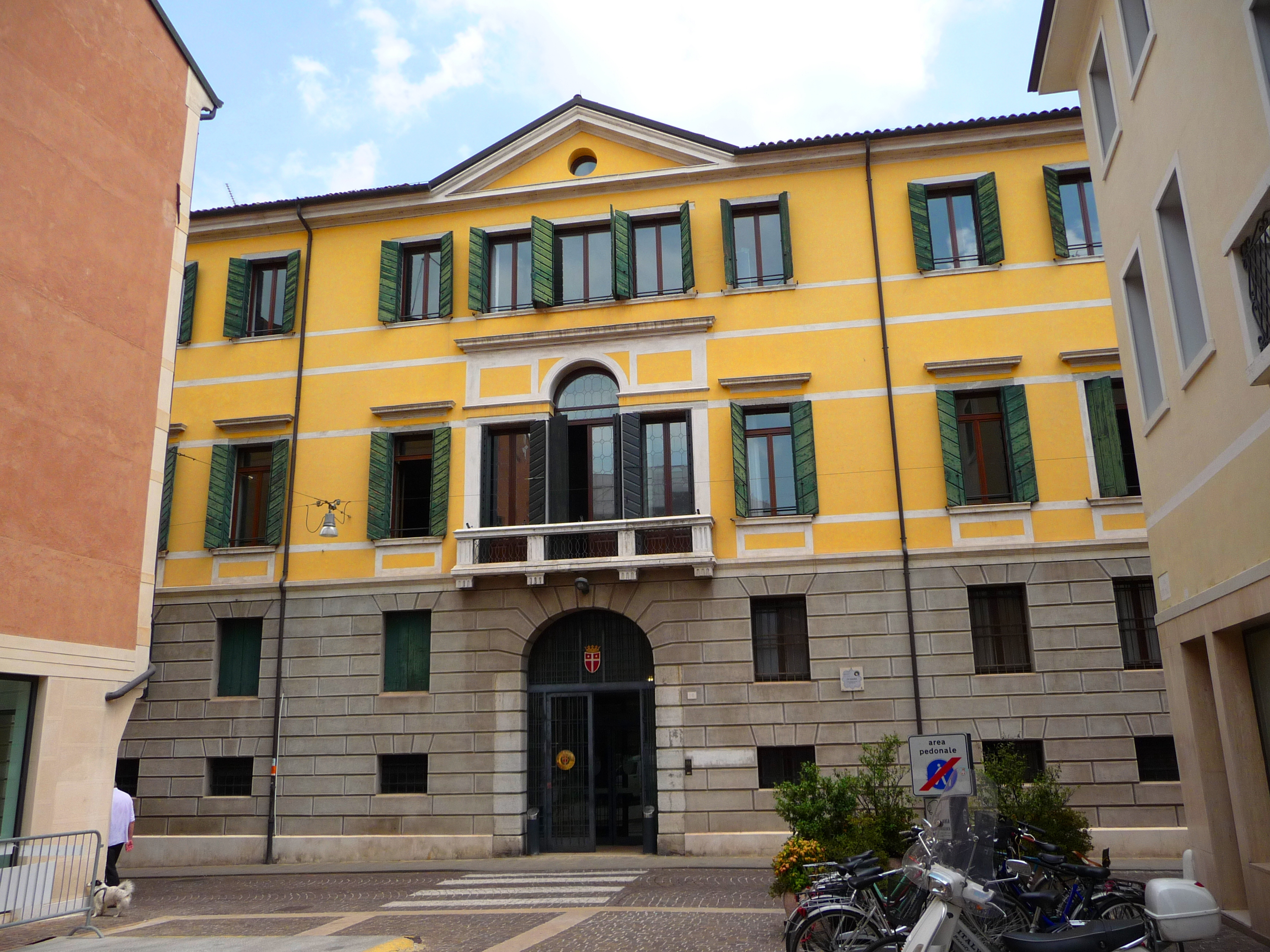
Ca Sugana, the municipal seat

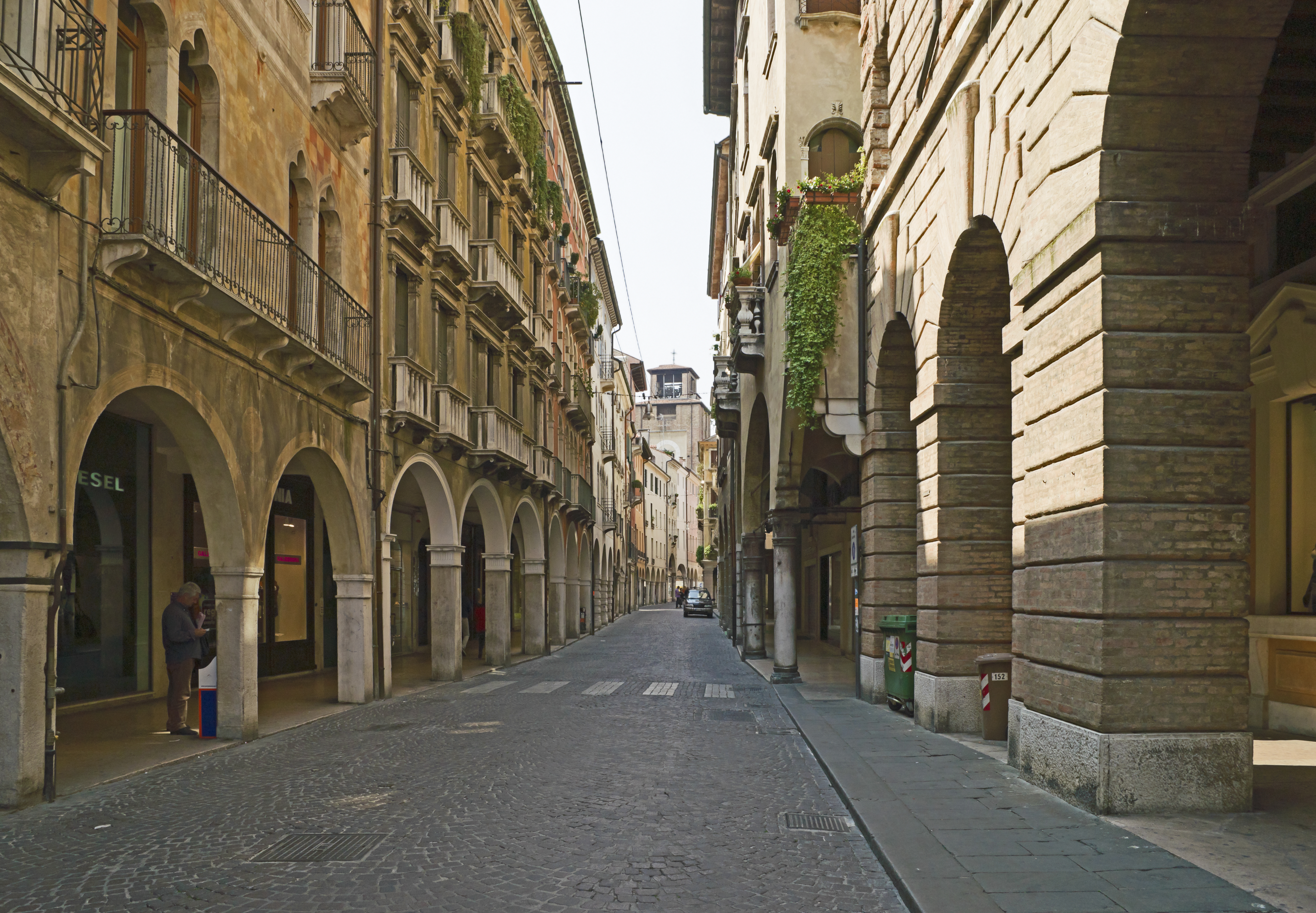
Via Calmaggiore (Main street)

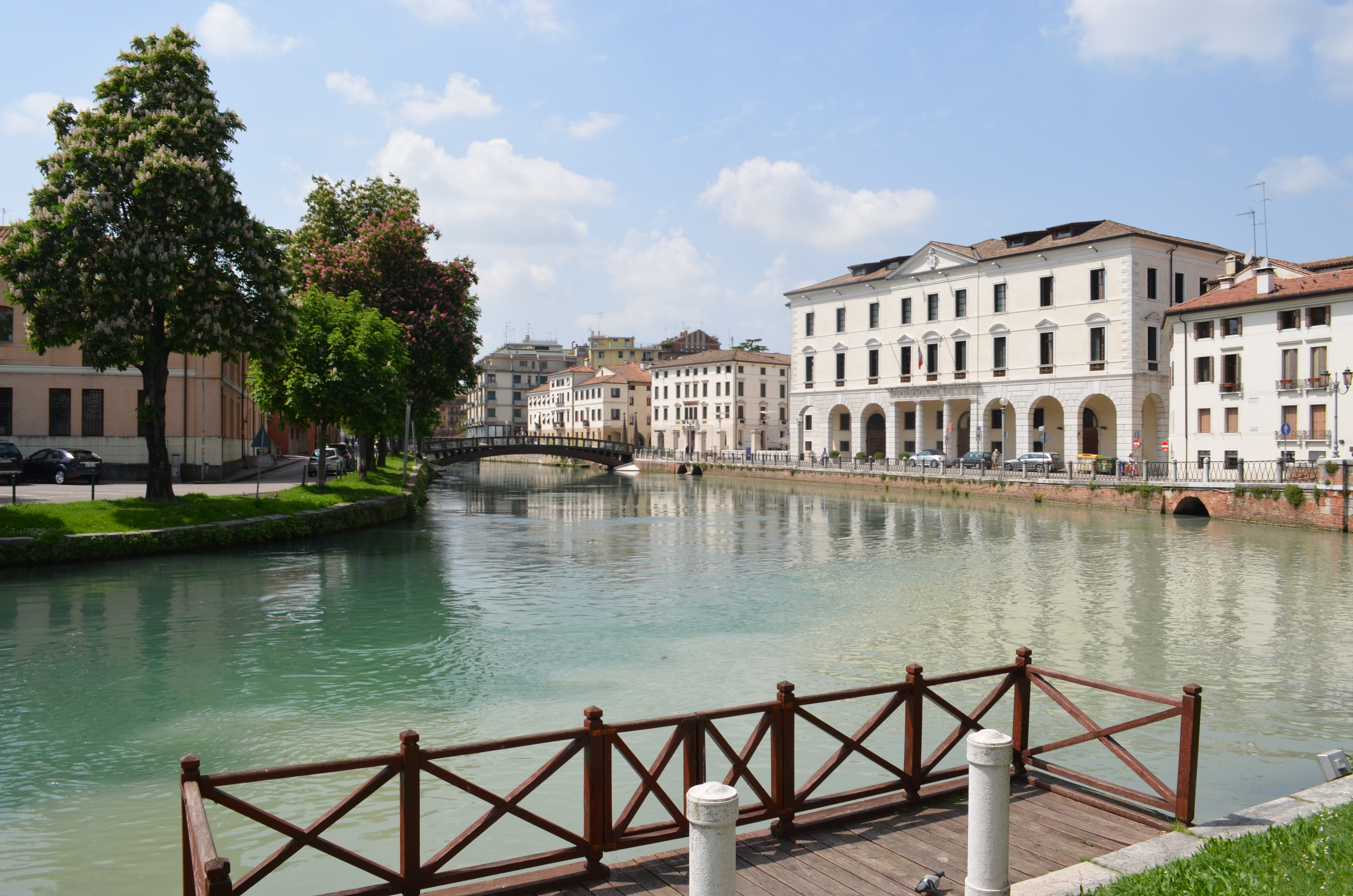
River Sile in Treviso

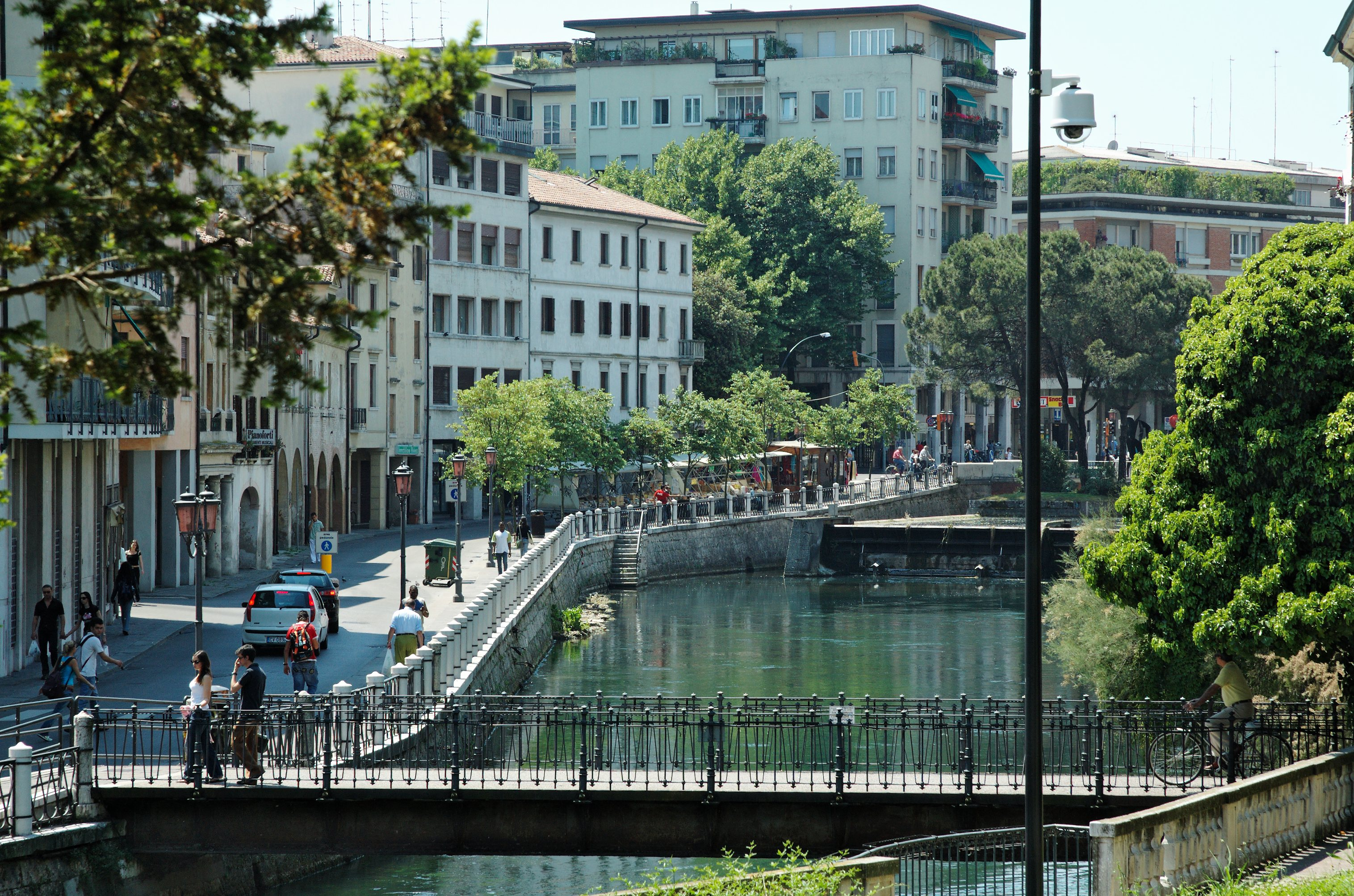
The Lungosile Mattei

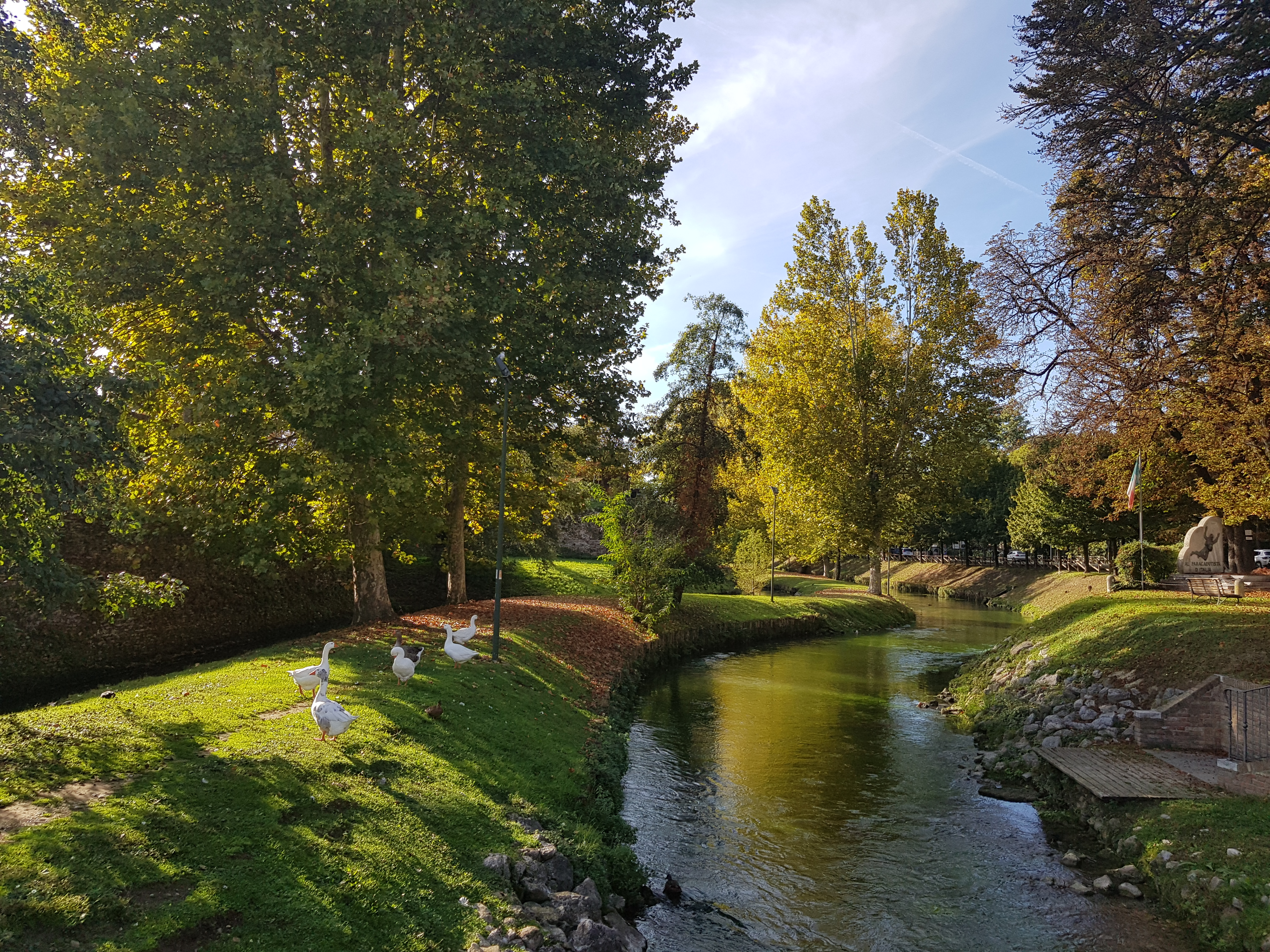
The Walls Park near Porta Manzoni

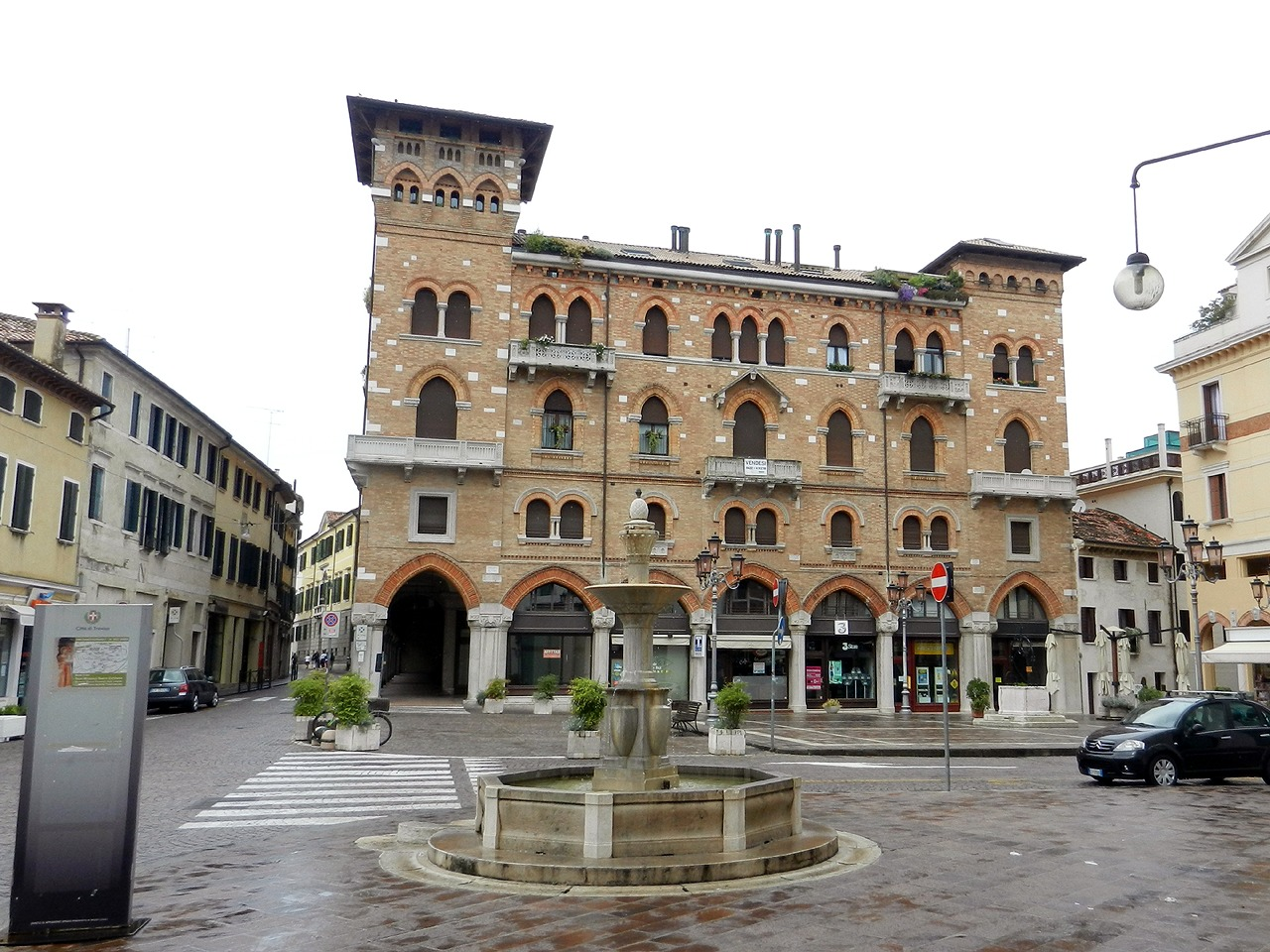
Piazza San Vito with the Palazzo Littorio

== See also ==
- Treviso Arithmetic, a textbook of commercial mathematics published by an anonymous author in the 15th century

== Bibliography ==
- Chisholm, Hugh, ed. (1911). "Treviso" . Encyclopædia Britannica. Vol. 27 (11th ed.). Cambridge University Press. p. 256.
