= Teatro Mario Del Monaco =

Opera house and theatre in Treviso, Italy

Coordinates: 45°40′10″N 12°14′59″E

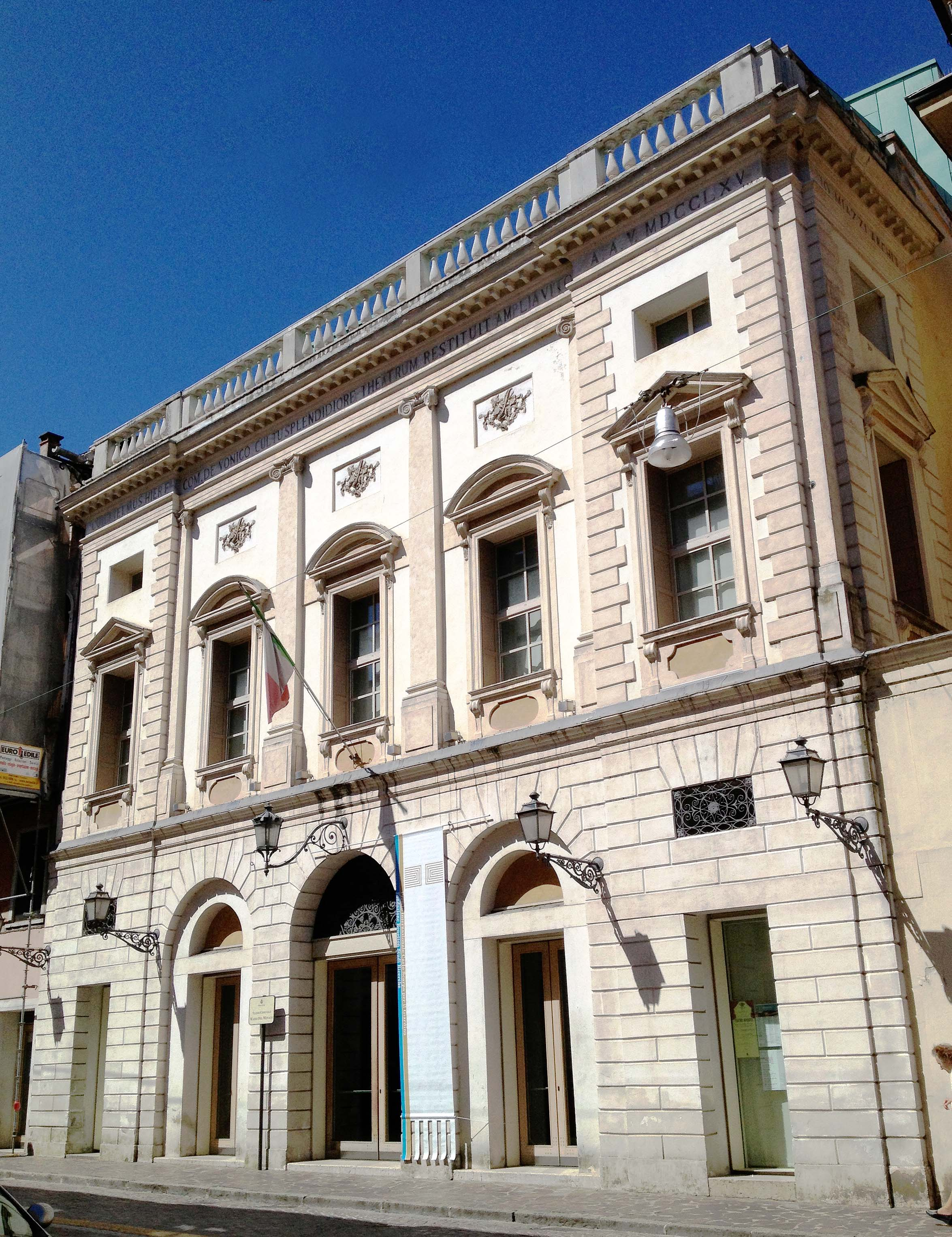
Exterior of the Teatro Mario Del Monaco in 2013

The Teatro Mario Del Monaco is an opera house and theatre in Treviso, Italy. It was previously known as the Teatro Onigo from 1692 to 1846, the Teatro Sociale from 1847 to 1930, and the Teatro Comunale from 1931 to 2011. In 2011, it was renamed in honour of the Italian tenor Mario Del Monaco who lived in Treviso from 1975 until his death in 1982. It is located in the historic centre of the city on the Corso del Popolo and since 2019 has been run by the Teatro Stabile del Veneto which also runs the Teatro Goldoni in Venice and the Teatro Verdi in Padua.

== Teatro Onigo ==
The Teatro Onigo was named for its founder and original proprietor, Count Fiorino Onigo. It was built on land owned by the Onigo family and occupied by rundown houses, shops and warehouses, all of which were demolished to make way for the new theatre. It was built in the "Italian style" with multiple tiers of boxes and completed in 1692. The theatre was inaugurated in October of that year with a production of Giovanni Frezza's opera Rosaclea. Onigo died a month later and the theatre passed to his son Gerolamo. However, by 1714 the theatre had closed and the building remained abandoned for decades.

Guglielmo Fiorino, who had inherited the abandoned theatre, decided to completely rebuild it. By that time Treviso was in need of a capacious theatre. The Teatro Santa Margherita had burnt down and the Teatro Dolfin had a seating capacity of only 600. Fiorino obtained permission to rebuild in 1763. The new theatre, which took three years to complete, was designed by Antonio Galli Bibiena with Giovanni Miazzi designing the facade and atrium. The theatre was inaugurated on 8 October 1766 with the world premiere of Guglielmi's opera Demofonte.

Antonio Galli Bibiena's drawings

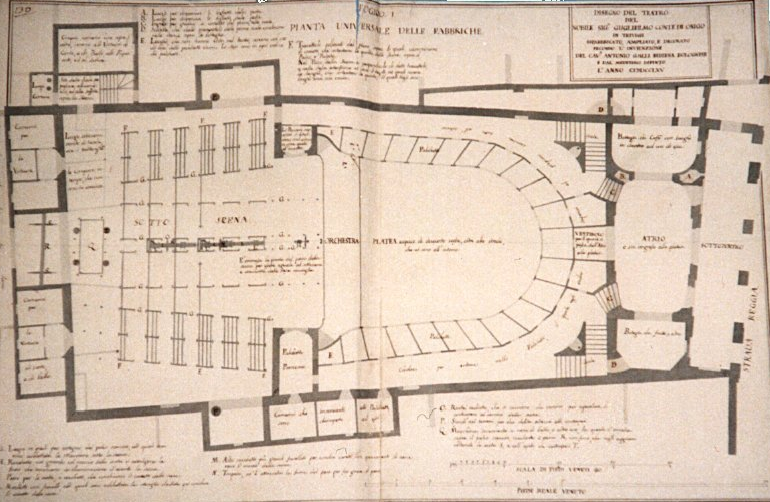
Floor plan

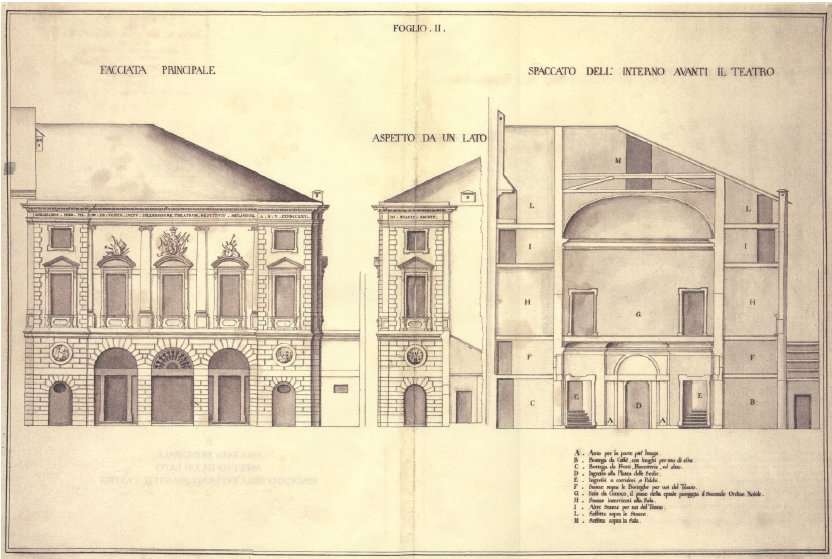
Vertical elevation

By the late 1830s, the Onigo family had ceded the management of the theatre to a society formed by its box holders, the Società dei Palchettisti.

== Teatro Sociale ==
The Società dei Palchettisti eventually petitioned the Onigo family to take over ownership of the theatre outright. After lengthy negotiations, the transfer was completed in 1846 and the theatre became known as the Teatro Sociale, or informally as the Teatro della Società. The new owners undertook works which included restoration of the facade and enclosing the portico and incorporating it into the atrium. The theatre operated successfully until 1868 when a disastrous fire destroyed it completely, leaving only the facade standing. The fire had been caused by the theatre's custodian who had a side business selling fireworks which he stored beneath the stage. One of the rockets exploded, setting off the remainder of the fireworks and a fire which eventually engulfed the building.

The theatre was quickly rebuilt to designs by Andrea Scala which kept the original facade. The internal decorations were entrusted to the painter Federico Andreotti and the sculptor Fausto Asteo. The rebuilt theatre opened in October 1869 with a production of Gounod's Faust.

== Teatro Comunale ==
A dispute between the city of Treviso and the Società dei Palchettisti led to the city taking possession of the theatre in 1931 and renaming it the Teatro Comunale. With the city suffering badly from the Allied bombing in World War II, it sold the theatre to Venerio Monti and his family in 1944. The sale was declared void in 1950 with compensation paid to the Monti family, and the city took back the ownership of the building. Renovations were carried out in the early 1960s, and in 1968, it became one of the 24 Italian theatres designated as a "Teatro di Tradizione". Such theatres are recognized by the Italian Ministry of Cultural Heritage as having made a particular impact on their city's artistic and musical traditions. The Comunale also initiated an international singing competition in 1969 at the suggestion of Antonio Mazzarolli (later mayor of the city and an Italian senator) and the soprano Toti Dal Monte who was born in the Province of Treviso. The competition launched the careers of many future opera stars including Ghena Dimitrova, Mariella Devia, Ferruccio Furlanetto, and Lorenzo Regazzo. The competition was named for Toti Dal Monte after her death in 1975.

The Comunale was closed between 1999 and 2003 as it no longer complied with fire-safety and building regulations. In July 2000, the city turned over the administration of the theatre to the Fondazione Cassamarca who financed the required remedial works. The theatre re-opened in November 2003 with a concert by the Royal Philharmonic Orchestra.

== Teatro Mario Del Monaco ==
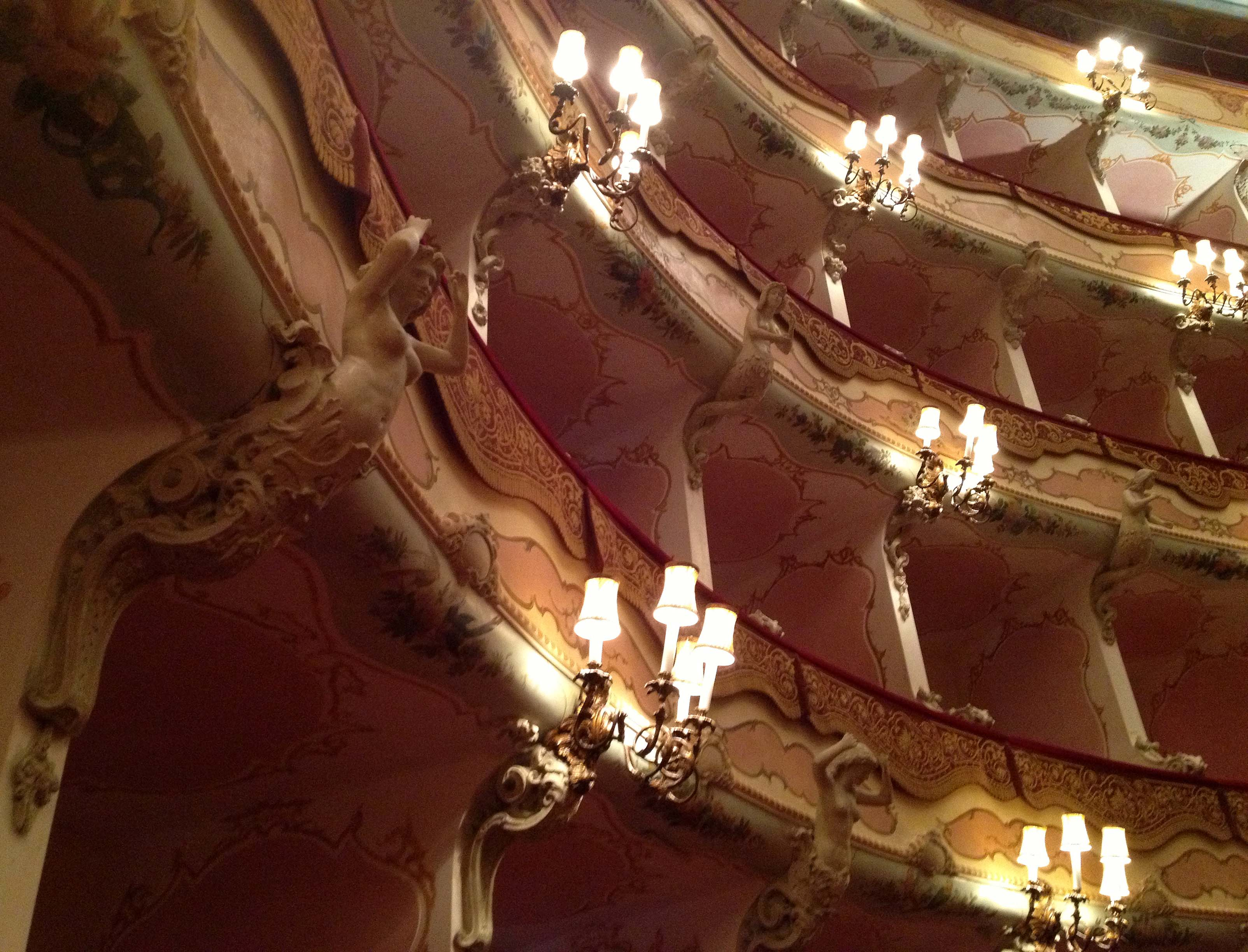
The theatre's tiers of boxes in 2013

In honour of the Italian tenor Mario Del Monaco, the Comunale was renamed Teatro Mario Del Monaco in 2011, the name by which it is known today. After his retirement from the stage in 1975 and until his death in 1982, Del Monaco had lived in the Villa Luisa on the outskirts of Treviso and taught singing there to private pupils. The management by the Fondazione Cassamarca continued until 2019. The original concession in 2000 had stipulated that the management concession would last for 30 years. However, by 2019, the cost of maintaining and running the theatre and financial pressure on the foundation led to an early dissolution of the agreement. The management of the theatre was taken over by the Teatro Stabile del Veneto which also runs the Teatro Goldoni in Venice and the Teatro Verdi in Padua. Stefano Canazza, the head of the Conservatorio Steffani in Castelfranco Veneto, was appointed the Teatro Del Monaco's Artistic Director.

The auditorium of the present theatre is horseshoe-shaped like its 1765 predecessor, the Teatro Onigo, and has a seating capacity of 700 arranged over the floor of the auditorium (platea), four tiers of boxes, and an upper gallery (loggione). It retains the facade of the 1765 building (with some modifications) and the internal decor by Federico Andreotti and Fausto Asteo from the theatre's rebuilding in 1869. The 2019/2020 season, the first under the management of the Teatro Stabile del Veneto, opened on 25 October 2019 with a production of Puccini's opera Madama Butterfly. The remaining operas of the season were Albinoni's La Statira, Strauss's Il pipistrello, Donizetti's Rita and Puccini's Gianni Schicchi.

Starting from 2020, the Teatre hosted Jazz Concert which were part of the Jazz Festival called Treviso Suona Jazz Festival. Artists like Enrico Rava. Uri Caine and Fred Hersch played ad Teatro Mario del Monaco.

== World premieres ==
Operas which had their world premieres at the theatre under its various names include:

- Pietro Alessandro Guglielmi's Demofoonte, Teatro Onigo, 8 October 1766
- Lucio Campiani's Il consiglio dei Dieci, Teatro Sociale, 14 November 1857
- Pompilio Sudessi's Sunanda, Teatro Sociale, 6 November 1896
- Angelo Tessaro's Giovanni Huss, Teatro Sociale, 3 November 1898
- Francesco De Guarnieri's Yvon, Teatro Sociale, 1 March 1908
- Antonio Certani's Floriana, Teatro Sociale, 1 October 1925
- Gian Francesco Malipiero's Il marescalco, Teatro Comunale, 22 October 1969
- Giorgio Ferrari's Lord Savile, Teatro Comunale, 16 October 1970,
- Sylvano Bussotti's Le rarità, Potente, Teatro Comunale, 12 October 1979
