= Piazza dei Signori, Treviso =

Coordinates: 45°39′57″N 12°14′44″E

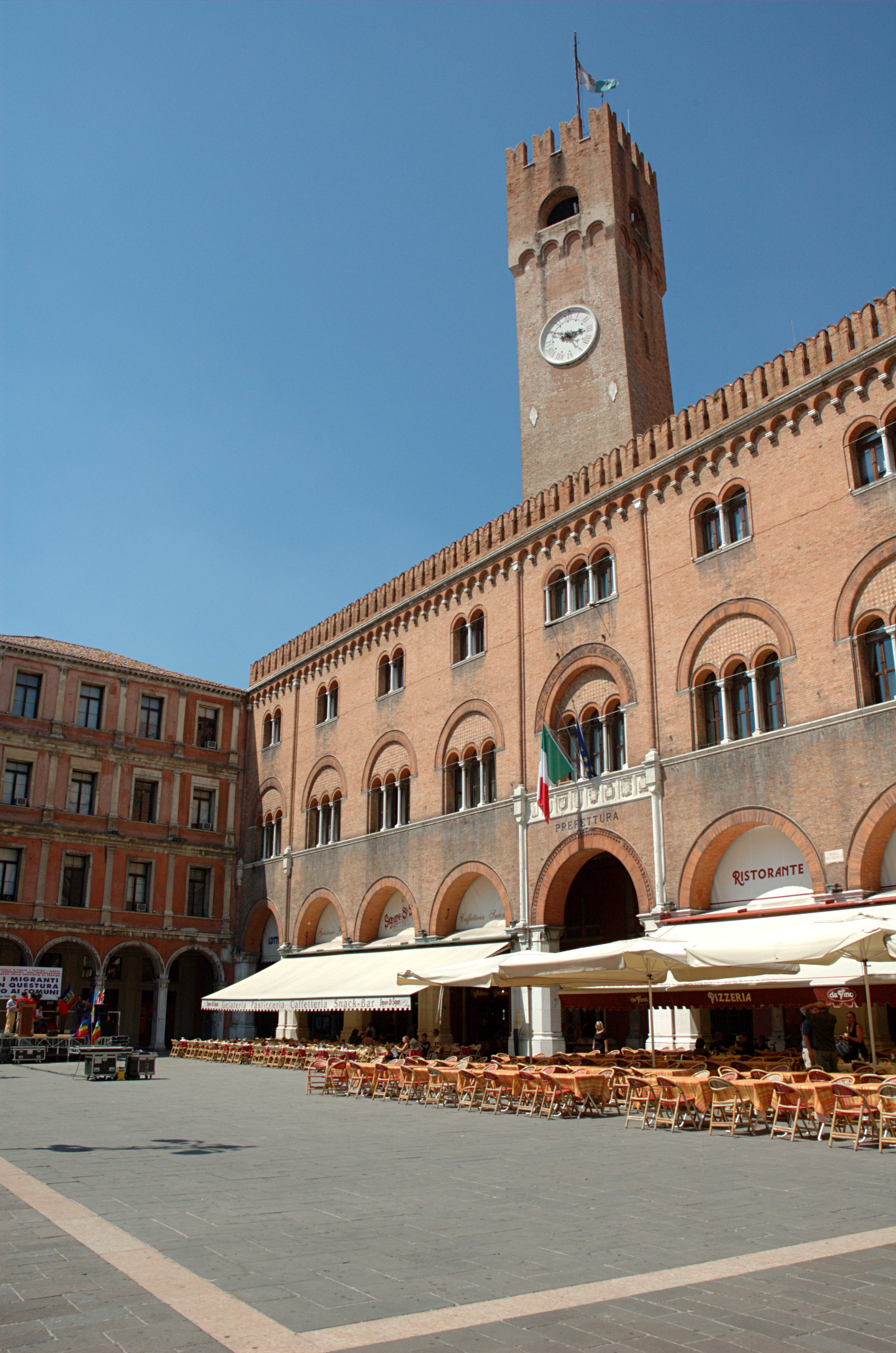
Piazza dei Signori

Piazza dei Signori is a city square in Treviso, north-eastern Italy.

It takes its name (meaning "Lords Square" in Italian) from the palaces of lords the former seignory of Treviso which face it. They include:

- Palazzo del Podestà with the Civic tower (13th century), which was the lordship's seat
- Palazzo dei Trecento
- Palazzo Pretorio (with a 17th century façade)
- Original seat of the Municipal Library and the Municipal Gallery (1847)

The Square also features several sculptures of Lion of Saint Mark, a symbol of the former domination of the Republic of Venice on Treviso.

== Gallery ==
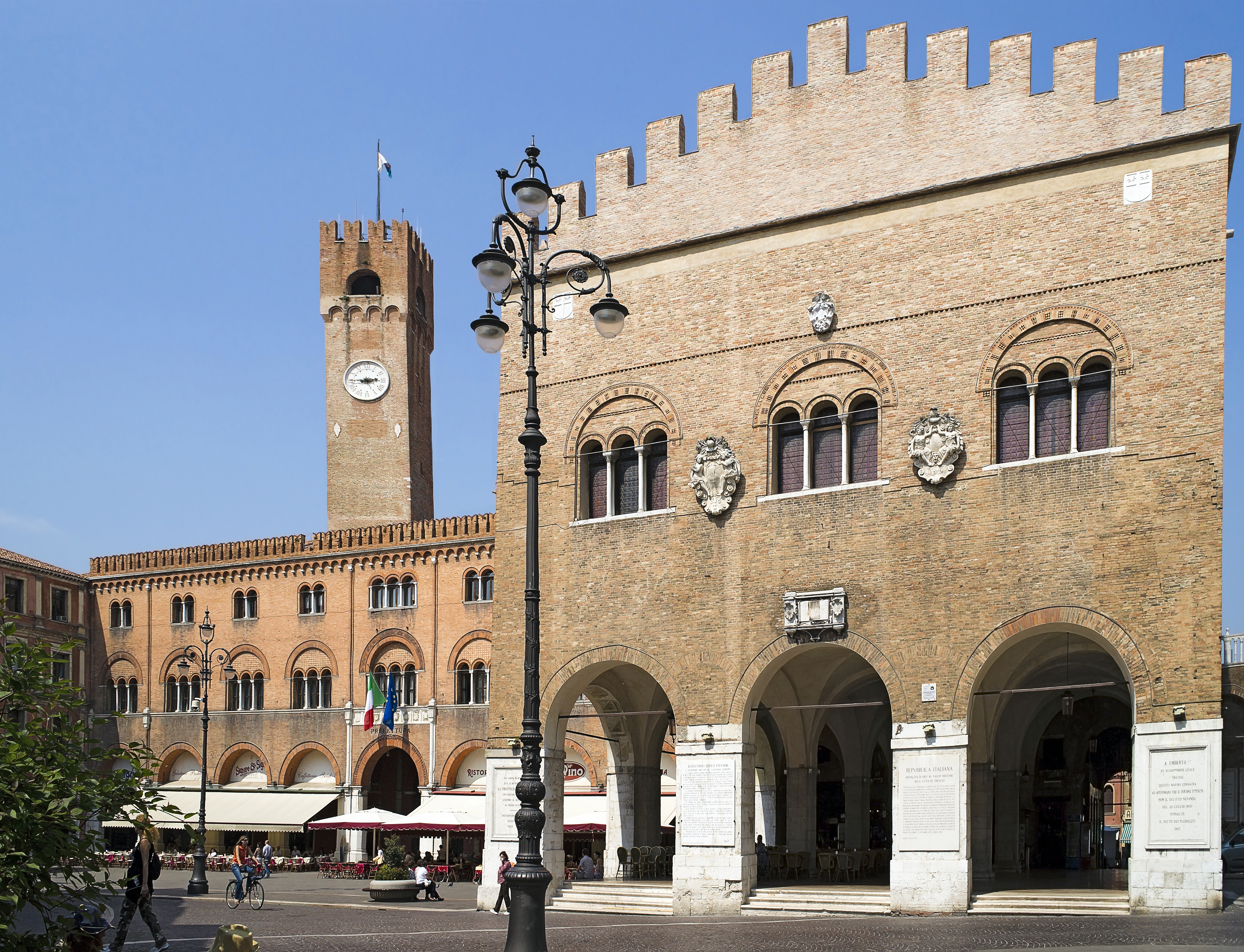
Piazza dei Signori and Palazzo dei Trecento

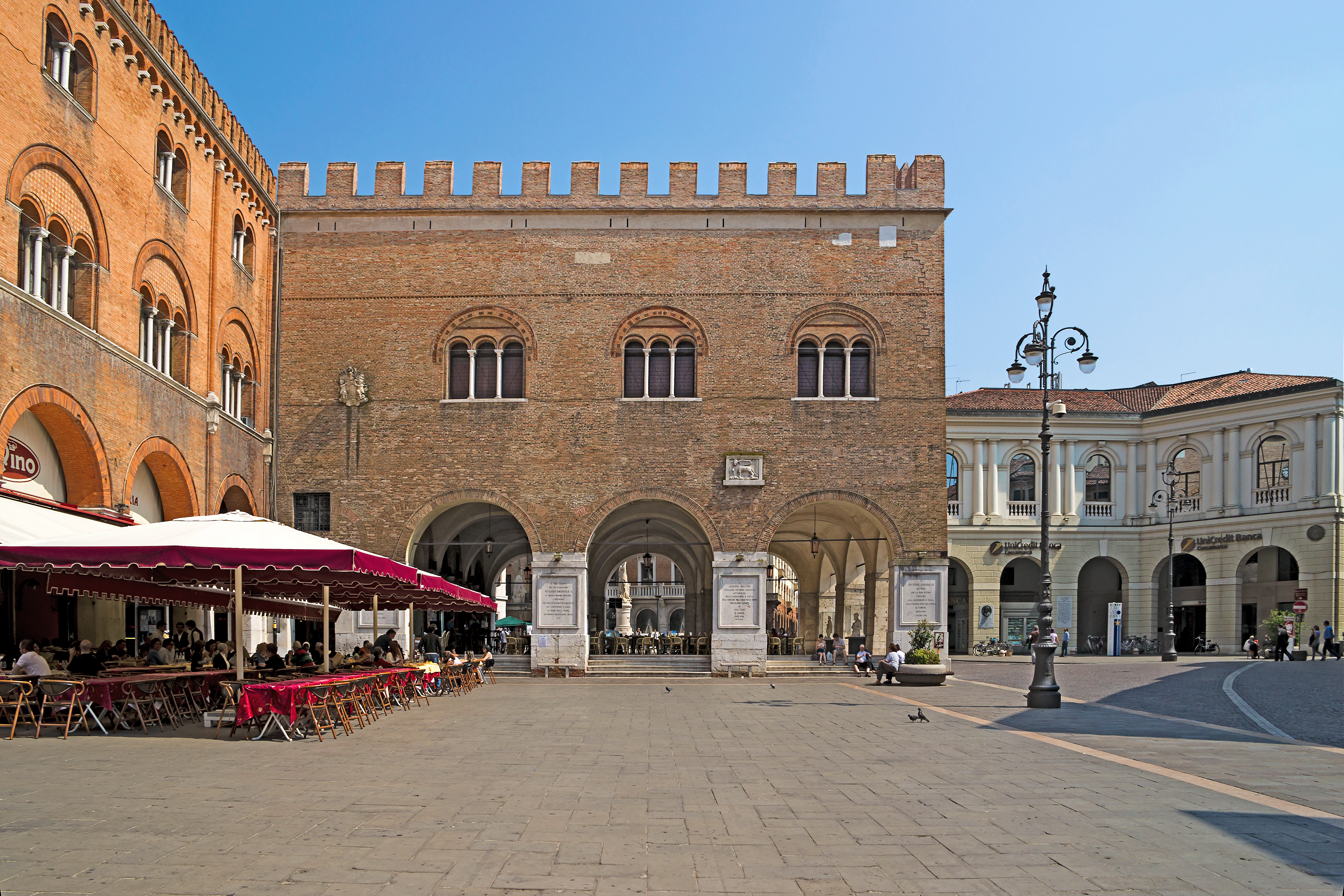

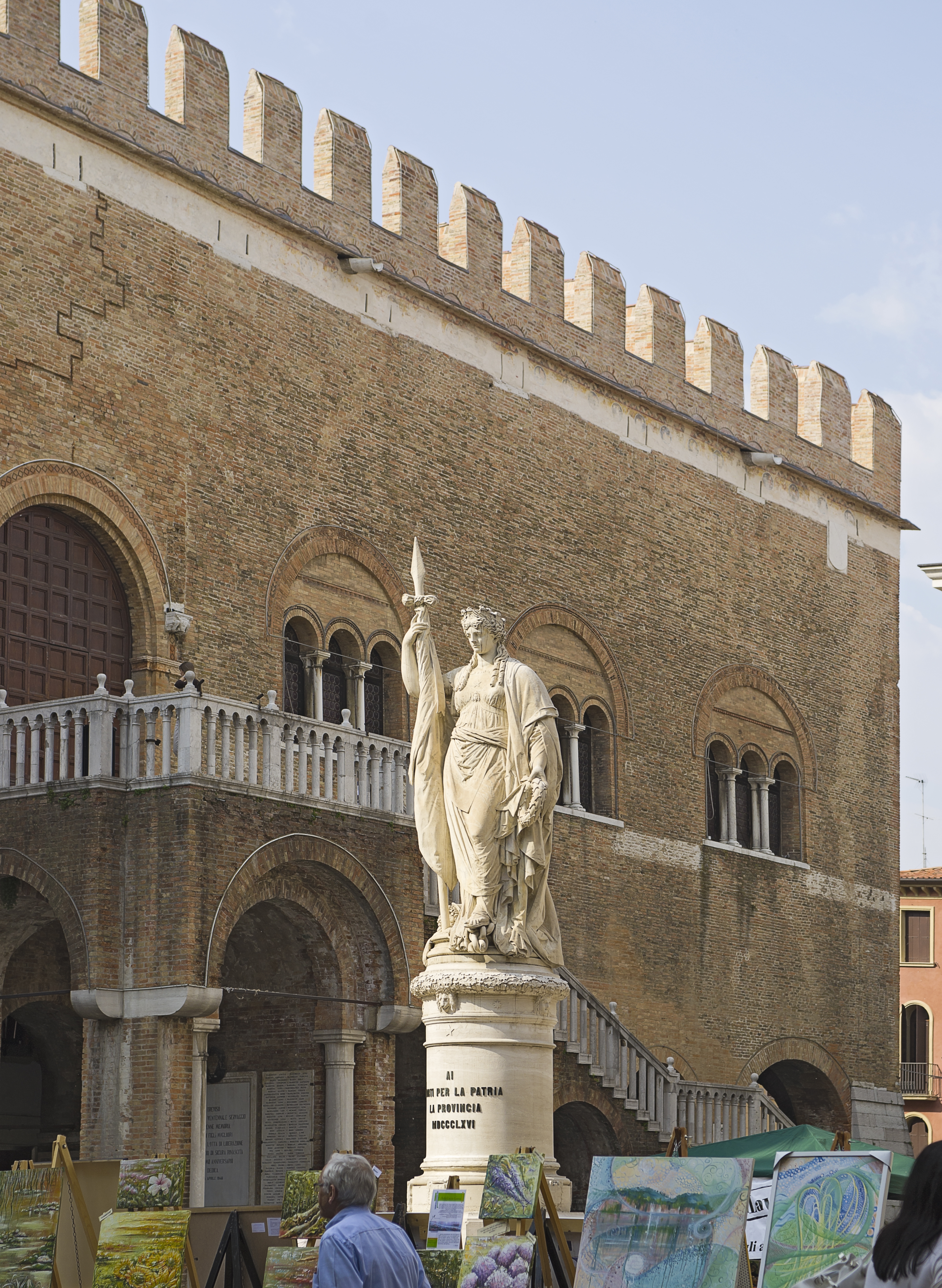
The statue statua of Teresona
