= Botteniga =

River in Northern Italy

The Botteniga is a river in northern Italy. It is a distributary of the Piave, and meets the Sile at Treviso after descending approximately 60 metres over its 20 kilometre course. The river's sources are a threatened natural heritage..
