= Orto Botanico Conservativo Francesco Busnello =

Botanical garden in Italy

Coordinates: 45°40′N 12°15′E

The Orto Botanico Conservativo Francesco Busnello (4000 m^{2}) is a botanical garden designed by the Accademia Trevigiana per il Territorio, and located on Viale Nazioni Unite, Treviso, Veneto, Italy. Starting from 2022 it is open daily and operated by NOI San Paolo.

The garden was established in 1987, and named in honor of Italy's first heart donor. In collaboration with the University of Padua, the garden aims to conserve genomes of traditional varieties of fruit plants now in danger of extinction. It contains about 100 plants representing 24 species, including Cornus mas, Corylus avellana, Crataegus azarolus, Cydonia oblonga, Diospyros kaki, Ficus carica, Juglans regia, Laurus nobilis, Malus domestica, Morus alba, Prunus armeniaca, Prunus avium, Prunus cerasifera, Prunus cerasus, Prunus domestica, Prunus mahaleb, Prunus persica, Prunus spinosa, Punica granatum, Pyrus communis, Rosa canina, Rubus ulmifolius, Vitis labrusca, and Ziziphus jujuba.

== See also ==
- List of botanical gardens in Italy
