= Palazzo dei Trecento =

Building in Treviso, Veneto, Italy

Coordinates: 45°39′57″N 12°14′45″E

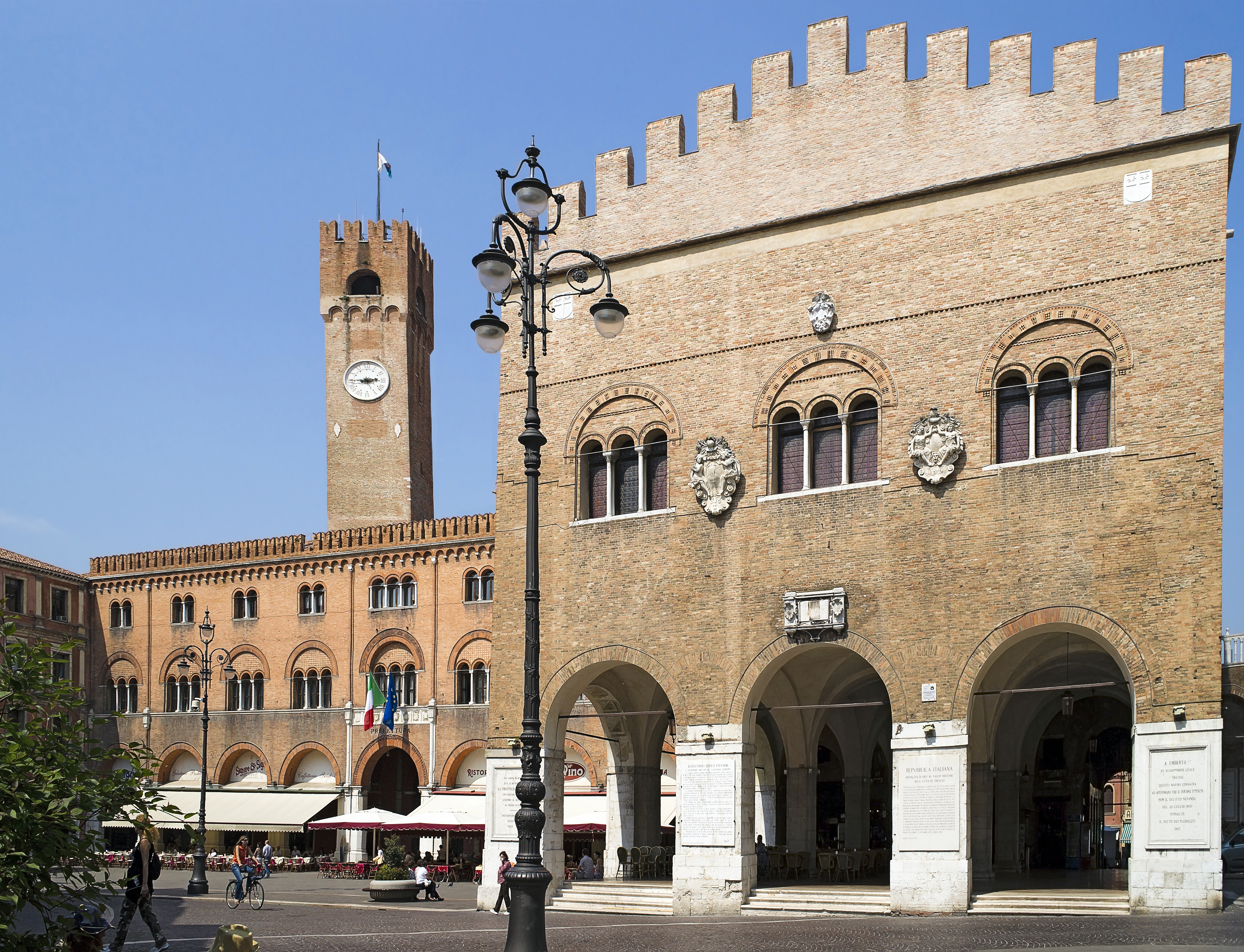
Palazzo dei Trecento

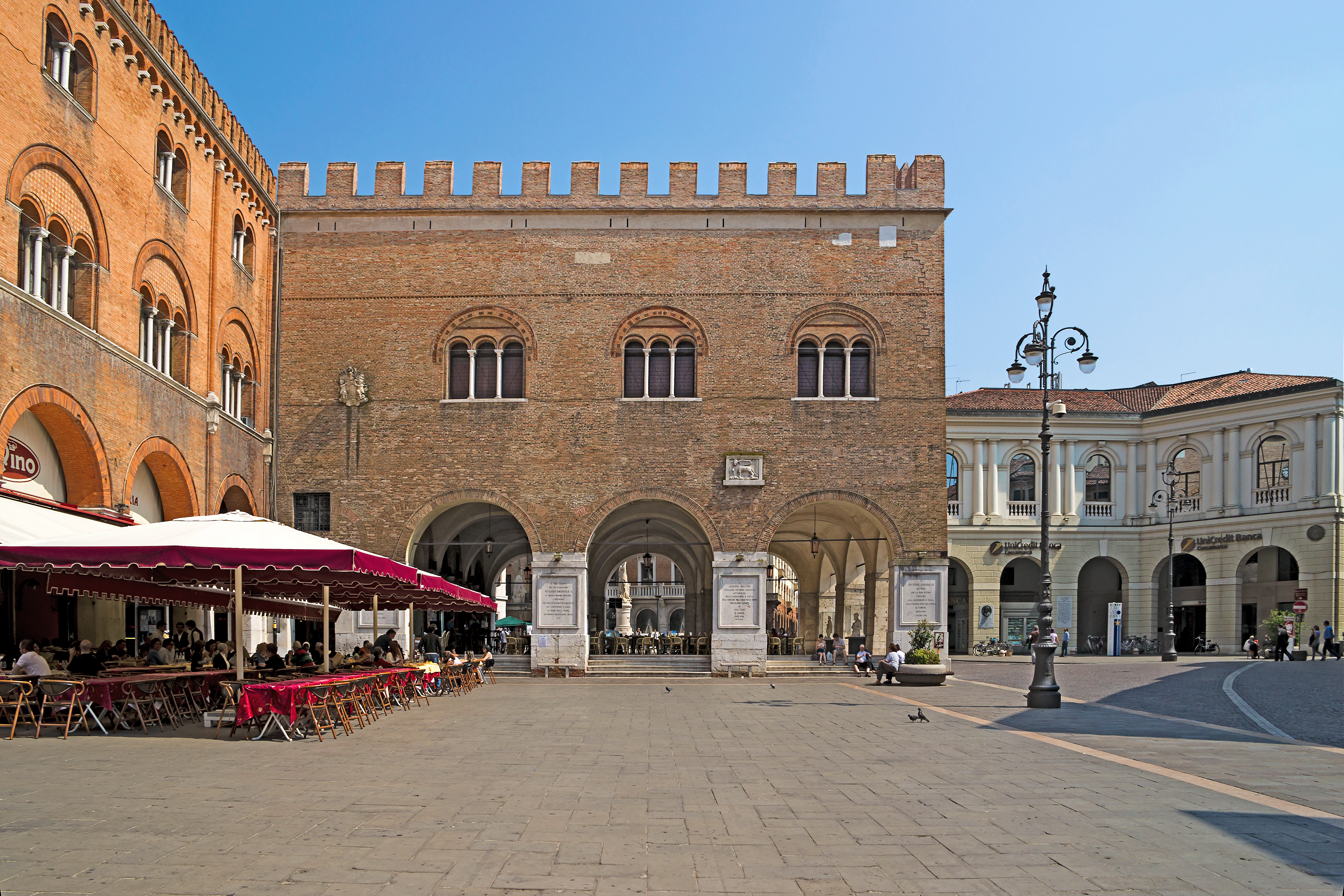
West facade of the palace

Palazzo dei Trecento (also called Palazzo della Ragione) is a building in Treviso, Veneto, northern Italy, located in the Piazza dei Signori. It is home to Treviso municipal council.

The palace was erected in the 13th and 14th centuries, as the seat of the Maggior Consiglio ("Highest Council"), the main administrative council in the city. It was designed by the venetian architect Gabriele Saccon. Built in brickworks, it has two floors, the lower one entered through a loggia. The upper floor has three triple mullioned windows.

Internally, there are remains of frescoes, painted from the 14th to the 16th centuries by Venetian artists, depicting coat of arms and themes of civil power and justice. On the southern walls are a Madonna with Child and St. Liberalis with Peter and the Cardinal Virtues.

The "remarkable" structure was rebuilt in the 19th century.

In 1944 the palace was bombed by Allied planes and nearly destroyed.
