= Bombing of Treviso in World War II =

Bombing of Treviso
- Part of Strategic bombing during World War II
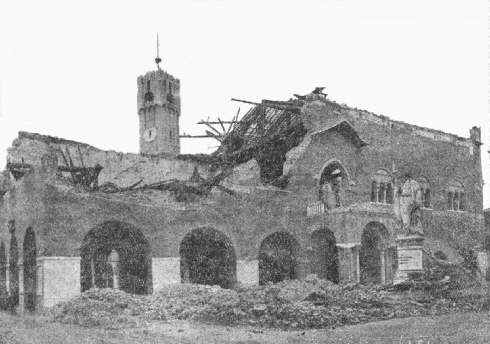
- Palazzo dei Trecento after the bombing
Date	7 April 1944
Location	Treviso, Veneto, Italy
Result	Extensive destruction and civilian casualties

Belligerents
(United States) USAAF	Italian Social Republic; Germany

Casualties and losses
1 B-17 bomber	1,470 civilians

The bombing of Treviso, a town in Northeastern Italy, took place on 7 April 1944, during World War II. Aimed at disabling the town's marshalling yard, it resulted in the destruction of most of the town.

== History ==
Treviso, a town of 60,000 inhabitants located in the Veneto region, thirty kilometres north of Venice, was in a strategically important position for railway communications in northeastern Italy, and was therefore bombed several times by the Allied air forces.

The first, and most devastating, raid took place on 7 April 1944. 159 Boeing B-17 Flying Fortress of the United States Army Air Force (escorted by Lockheed P-38 Lightning fighters) dropped over 2,000 bombs (446 metric tons of ordnance) during an attack which lasted five minutes (from 1.24 PM to 1.29 PM); the target was the local marshalling yard, but the inaccuracy of the bombing caused most of the bombs to fall all over the city, destroying most of it.

Out of 4,600 buildings, 700 were destroyed, 1,100 heavily damaged and 1,962 slightly damaged. A large part of the medieval parts of the city centre were destroyed; the medieval Palazzo dei Trecento, distant only 700 meters from the objective, was partly destroyed. Between 1,000 and 1,600 civilians were killed, including 123 children. According to the records of the municipality, 1,600 inhabitants of Treviso were killed by air raids during the war, of whom 1,470 died in the raid of 7 April 1944; some 30,000 were left homeless. This makes the 7 April 1944 raid on Treviso the second deadliest air raid suffered by an Italian city during the war, after the 19 July 1943 raid on Rome that killed between 1,600 and 3,200 people.

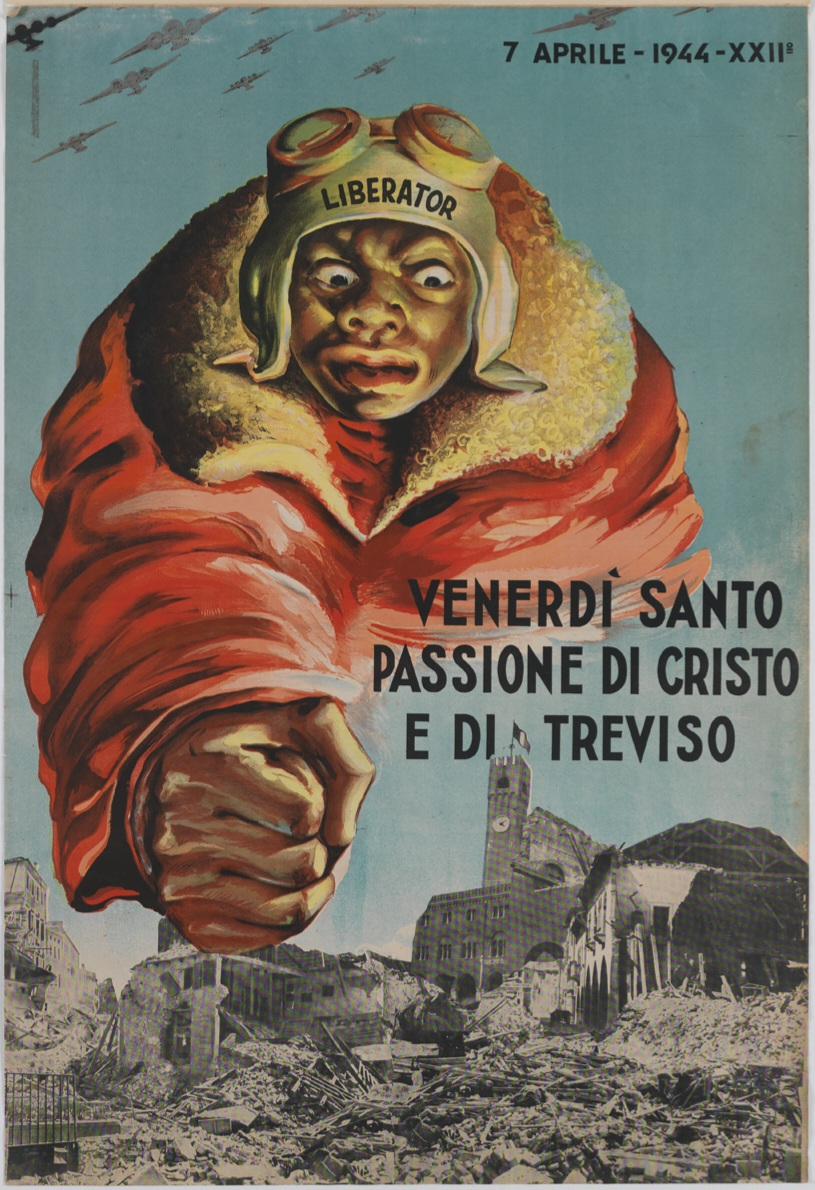
Propaganda poster by Gino Boccasile denouncing the Allied bombing of Treviso on 7 April 1944

The attackers lost one B-17, shot down by anti-aircraft guns of the nearby Treviso Airport. As the bombing occurred on Good Friday, fascist propaganda called the day "passion of Christ and of Treviso".

== Further raids ==
A further twelve air raids (both by the Royal Air Force and the USAAF), mostly targeting the marshalling yard, took place in the following eleven months: on 20 April 1944, 14 May 1944, 20 October 1944, 21, 22, 25 and 27 December 1944, 11, 15 and 31 January 1945, and 13 and 31 March 1945. These raids caused further damage and destruction to the town, albeit none was as destructive and deadly as the first one had been.

Giuseppe Berto's novel The Sky is Red and the film with the same name are set during the bombing of Treviso and its aftermath, and ruined buildings of the town were used as set for the movie.
