= Sisley (disambiguation) =

Alfred Sisley (1839–1899) was a French impressionist painter of English origin.

Sisley may also refer to:

- Brian Sisley (1964–2013), American professional football player
- Sue Sisley, American psychiatrist, known for cannabis and psilocybin research
- Tomer Sisley (born 1974), Israeli French humorist and actor
- Sisley, a fashion brand, owned by the Benetton Group established in 1974
  - Sisley Volley, former sponsorship name of Volley Treviso, a professional volleyball team based in Belluno, Italy
- Sisley (company), a French skin care and perfume brand
- Sisley Choi (born 1991), Hong Kong TVB actress
- Sisley Huddleston (1883–1952), British journalist and writer
- 6675 Sisley, a main-belt asteroid
