= Barchessa Loredan =

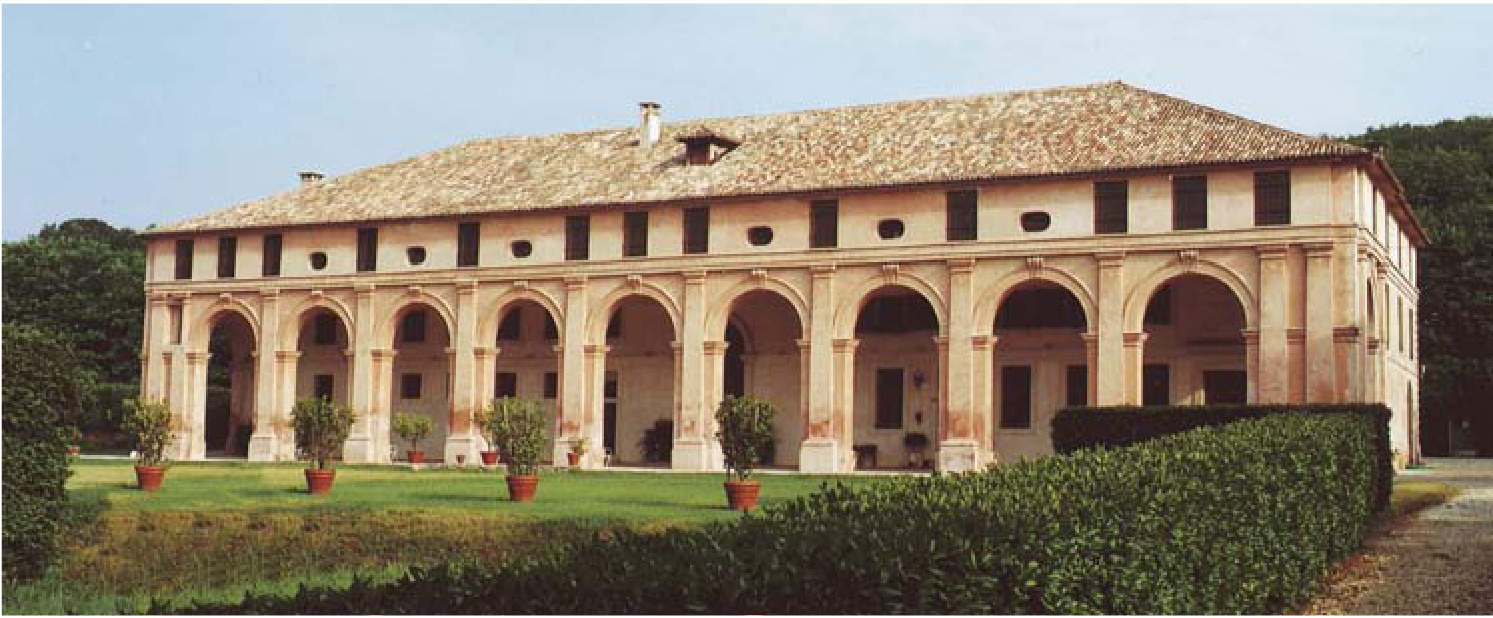
- Barchessa Loredan in Volpago del Montello
- Interactive map of the Barchessa Loredan area
- Alternative names: Barchessa di Villa Bressa Loredan
- Etymology: by the Loredan family

General information
- Location: Via Frà Giocondo 57, Volpago del Montello, Italy
- Completed: 16th century
- Owner: Loredan family

Technical details
- Floor count: 2
- Grounds: 124 acres (50 hectares)

The Barchessa di Villa Bressa Loredan, known as the Palazzon, is a 16th-century Palladian barchessa of the Loredan family immersed in the vineyards of Volpago del Montello, but clearly visible from the Schiavonesca state road, between Montebelluna and Conegliano, to which it is connected by a long avenue of hazelnuts.

== Description ==
The barchessa is part of a vast complex which also includes a Venetian villa which was destroyed around 1840 by the then owners Scondella. It is said that it was the powerful Bressa family who diverted the Brentella di Pederobba, the canal behind it, to obviate the law of the Serenissima which required the destruction of all the buildings north of the Canàl that runs along the Montello hill, as the land had to be sold to become state property.

The noble residence, built in the sixteenth century, at the beginning of the eighteenth century became property of Pietro Marcello, who had it restored by Giorgio Massari. From what is reported in a map by Angelo Prati in 1763, the villa appeared as a two-storey, tripartite volume, with the classic central tympanum and a single barchessa. Pietro Marcello's wife, Orsetta, transformed the residence into a humanistic center, hosting artists and writers of the Serenissima, including the bishop of Treviso, Giustinian.

Today the imposing barchessa remains of the original complex, with the entrance gates and part of the surrounding wall, owned by the Loredan patricians, who are responsible for the latest recovery. The building consists of nine arches with a volute keystone and framed by Doric pilasters supporting a molded entablature, which extend over the entire ground floor, turning with a single span. Above the portico rises the first floor, with a very large attic, in which all the heating systems for the breeding of silkworms are still preserved.

== Barchessa Loredan winery ==
The Barchessa Loredan winery is based in the barchessa, and is owned by the Loredan family, who managed the latest renovation.

It directly produces and markets its wines obtained from D.O.C. Montello and D.O.C.G. Asolo. The farm covers an area of 50 hectares (120 acres) of vineyards in the hamlets of Selva and Venegazzù, and is managed by Countess Nicoletta Loredan Moretti degli Adimari, who founded it in the 1960s.

Above the portico rises the first floor, with a very large attic, perfectly restored, in which the most significant memories of the Loredan family are preserved.
