= Villa Garzoni =

Villa Garzoni may refer to:

- Villa Garzoni (Collodi), a villa in Tuscany
- Villa Garzoni (Pontecasale), a villa in Padua
