= Garzoni =

Garzoni is a surname. Notable people with the surname include:

- Giovanna Garzoni (1600–1670), Italian painter
- Giovanni Garzoni (1419–1506), Italian humanist and physician
- Leonardo Garzoni (1543–1592), Italian philosopher
- Mike Garzoni (1923–2007), American football offensive lineman
- Tommaso Garzoni (1549 – 1589), Italian Renaissance writer

== See also ==
- Palazzo Garzoni
- Villa Garzoni (disambiguation)
