= Palais Universitaire, Strasbourg =

Building in the University of Strasbourg, former seat of the Council of Europe

Coordinates: 48.5848°N 7.7625°E

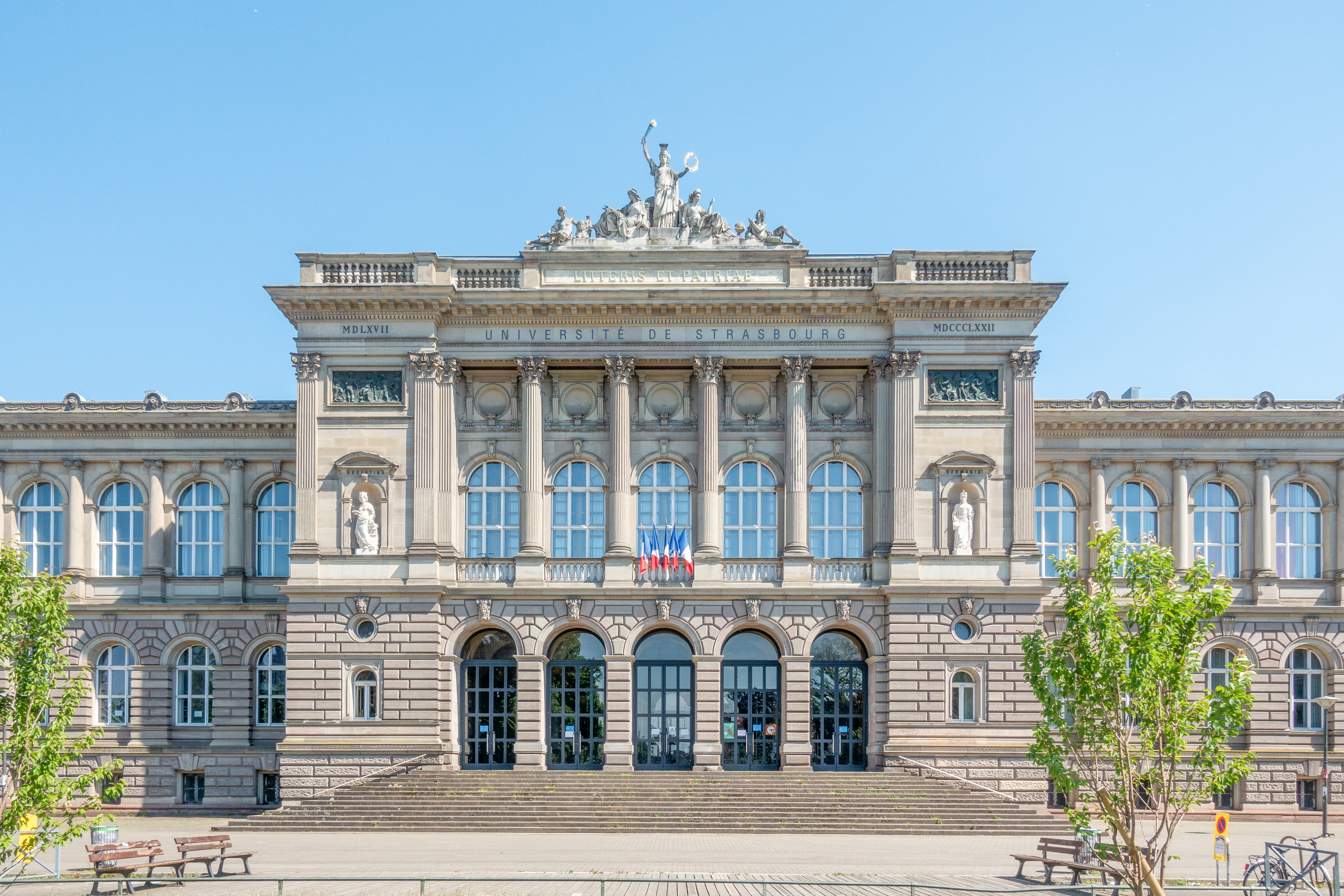
Detail of façade in 2022

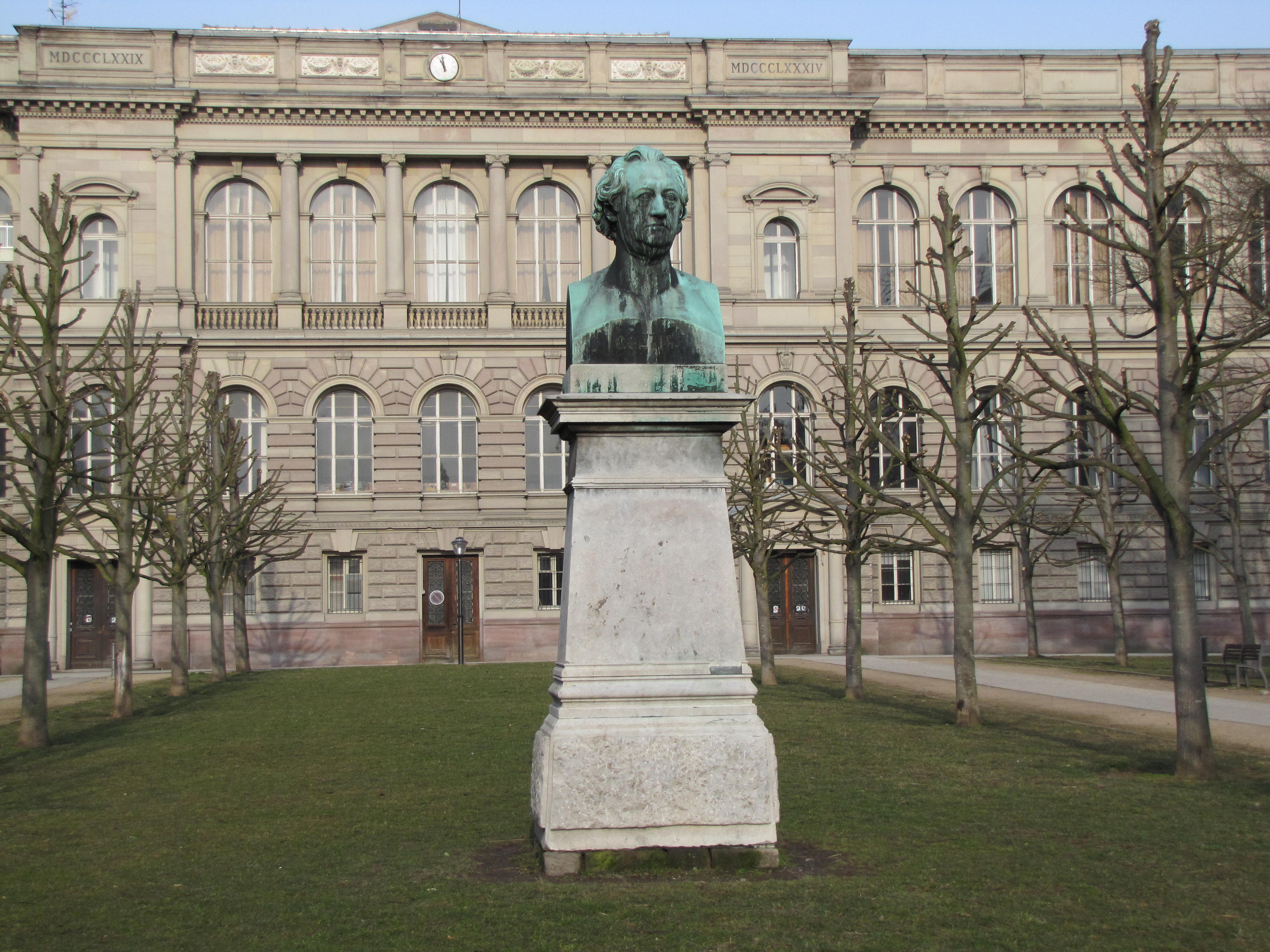
Rear of Palace with building dates, garden and bust of Goethe

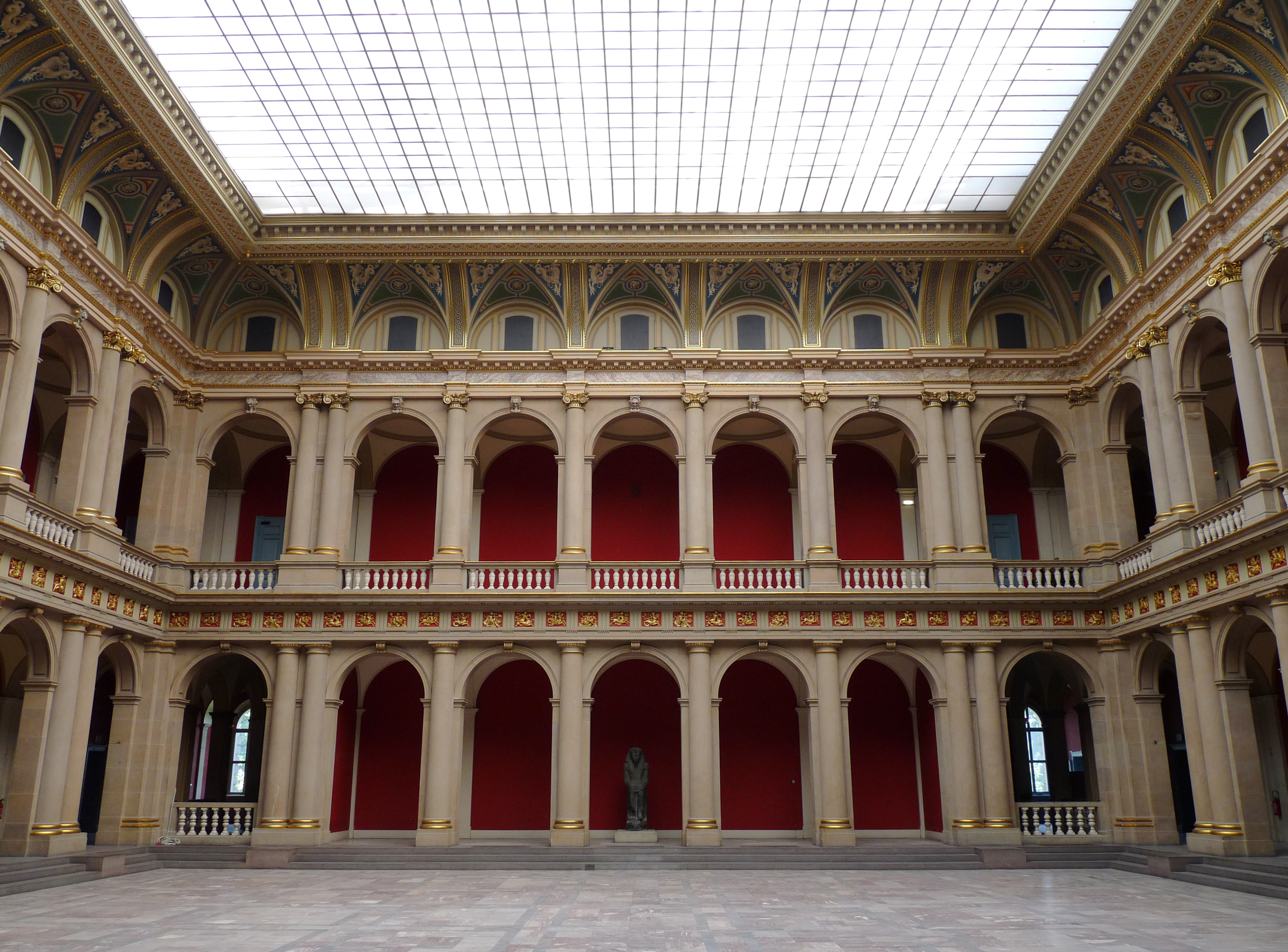
The Grand hall, or Aula

The Palais Universitaire in Strasbourg is a large, neo-Renaissance style building, constructed between 1879 and 1884 under the direction of the German architect Otto Warth. It was inaugurated in 1884 by Wilhelm I, Emperor of Germany. Through Avenue de la Liberté (former Kaiser-Wilhelm-Straße), it faces the equally monumental former imperial palace (Kaiserpalast).

The building served for several decades as the centre of the new imperial University of Strasbourg. The old university transferred from the buildings that it had occupied for centuries at the Jean Sturm Gymnasium to the new ones located in the Neustadt.

== Italianate features ==
The architect, Otto Warth (1845–1918), from Karlsruhe, was young when he was entrusted with the design of the building. He had just returned from a one-year study visit to Italy, and his passion for Italian classical architecture is reflected in some of the Italianate features of the Palais.

== The Aula ==
One of the most distinctive features of the building is the Aula, which measures 25 m by 29 m and 16 m high, which Warth modeled on the Villa Garzoni in Pontecasale, Candiana. It is decorated with a monumental seated statue of Ramses II, 2.15 m (7 ft 1 in) high, brought in 1933 by Pierre Montet.

In 2012, the Aula was dedicated to Marc Bloch, former professor at the university, shot by the Nazis in 1944.

== Statuary ==
The Palais is striking for the statuary of its façades, which pay hommage to a number of scientists, theologians, theoricians and thinkers with Germanic connections, thirty-six in all, as follows:

1. von Baer, Karl Ernst Ritter von Baer Edler von Huthorn (1792 – 1876), scientist and explorer

2. Bopp, Franz Bopp (1791 – 1867), linguist

3. Böckh, August Böckh or Boeckh (1785 – 1867), classical scholar and antiquarian

4. von Buch, Christian Leopold von Buch (1774 – 1853), geologist and paleontologist

5. Calvin, John or Jean Calvin (1509 – 1564), theologian, pastor and reformer in Geneva

6. Copernicus, Nicolaus Copernicus (1473 – 1543), polymath, mathematician, astronomer

7. Eichhorn, Karl Friedrich Eichhorn (1781 – 1854), jurist

8. von Fraunhofer, Joseph Ritter von Fraunhofer (1787 – 1826), physicist and optical lens manufacturer.

9. Gauss, Johann Carl Friedrich Gauss (1777 – 1855), mathematician and physicist

10. Jac. Grimm, Jacob Ludwig Karl Grimm (1785 – 1863), linguist, philologist, jurist, and folklorist

11. von Guericke, Otto von Guericke (1602 – 1686), scientist, inventor, and politician

12. von Haller, Albrecht von Haller (also known as Albertus de Haller; 1708 – 1777), anatomist, physiologist, naturalist, encyclopedist, bibliographer and poet

13. von Humboldt, Friedrich Wilhelm Heinrich Alexander von Humboldt (1769 – 1859), geographer, naturalist, explorer, and proponent of Romantic philosophy and science

14. Jacobi, Carl Gustav Jacob Jacobi (1804 – 1851), mathematician

15. Kant, Immanuel Kant (1724 – 1804), philosopher

16. Kepler, Johannes Kepler (1571 – 1630), astronomer, mathematician, astrologer, natural philosopher and writer on music

17. Leibniz, Gottfried Wilhelm (von) Leibniz (1646 – 1716), polymath, mathematician, philosopher, scientist, and diplomat

18. von Liebig, Justus Freiherr von Liebig (1803 – 1873), one of the founders of organic chemistry

19. Lessing, Gotthold Ephraim Lessing (1729 – 1781), philosopher, dramatist, publicist and art critic

20. Luther, Martin Luther (1483 – 1546), priest, theologian and hymnwriter.

21. Melanchthon, Philip Melanchthon (1497 – 1560), Lutheran reformer

22. Müller, Johannes Peter Müller (1801 – 1858), physiologist, comparative anatomist, ichthyologist, and herpetologist,

23. Niebuhr, Barthold Georg Niebuhr (1776 – 1831), statesman, banker, and historian

24. Paracelsus, Philippus Aureolus Theophrastus Bombastus von Hohenheim (1493 – 1541), physician, alchemist, lay theologian and philosopher

25. v. Pufendorf, Samuel Freiherr von Pufendorf (1632 – 1694), jurist, political philosopher, economist and historian

26. Savigny, Friedrich Carl von Savigny (1779 – 1861), jurist and historian

27. Schleiermacher, Friedrich Daniel Ernst Schleiermacher (1768 – 1834), Reformed theologian, philosopher, and biblical scholar

28. v. Schwarzenberg, Johann of Schwarzenberg (1463 – 1528), moralist and reformer

29. Schöpflin, Johann Daniel Schöpflin (1694 – 1771), professor of history, rhetoric and law at the University of Strasbourg

30. Sleidanus, Johannes Sleidanus or Sleidan (1506-1556), historian of the Reformation

31. Spener, Philipp Spener (1635-1705), Lutheran theologian, founder of Pietism

32. Joh. Sturm, Johannes or Jean Sturm (1507 – 1589), educator and Protestant reformer

33. Werner, Abraham Gottlob Werner (1749 – 1817), geologist

34. Winckelmann, Johann Joachim Winckelmann (1717 – 1768), art historian and archaeologist

35. F.A Wolf, Friedrich August Wolf (1759 – 1824), classicist, founder of modern philology

36. Zwingli, Huldrych or Ulrich Zwingli (1484 – 1531), leader of the Reformation in Switzerland

Two allegorical statues representing Germania (Germany) and Argentina (Strasbourg), the former removed in 1918 and the latter destroyed in 1945, were replaced in their respective niche on the façade in 2014, after having been restored and/or replicated based on photos.

== Monument historique ==
On 21 May 1990, the hall, the Aula and the main stairways were classified as a monument historique.

== Council of Europe ==
The Parliamentary Assembly of the Council of Europe held its first session in this building, from 8 August to 10 September 1949.

== University Press ==
The Presses Universitaires de Strasbourg, reputedly the oldest university press in France, has had its headquarters in the building ever since it was founded in 1920.

== Gypsothèque ==
The Palace's basement houses the Gypsothèque de Strasbourg, also known as Musée des moulages (plaster cast museum). This classical cast collection was initiated with the founding of the Kaiser-Wilhelms-Universität in 1872 by Adolf Michaelis, a distinguished classical scholar and art history pioneer. Next to casts of works like Harmodius and Aristogeiton, Apollo Belvedere, Aphrodite of Cnidus and the metopes of the Parthenon, the museum also displays casts of works by Antoine Bourdelle. The collection is the second largest cast collection in France and the largest university cast collection of France. The collections were moved into the Palace's basement in 1939, with the outbreak of World War II, and have stayed there since, although plans have periodically been made to move them into a separate building.

== Gallery ==
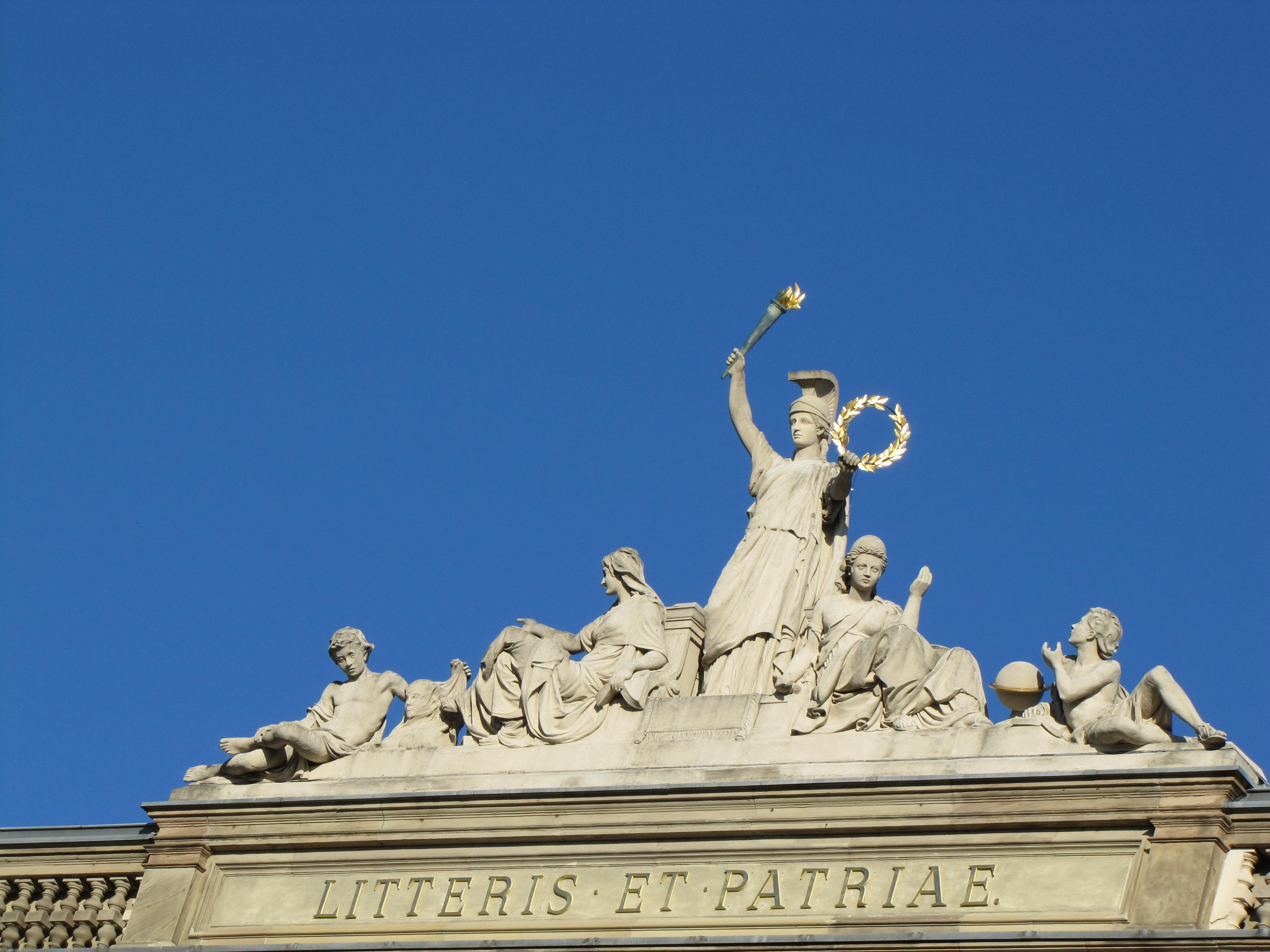
The Palace's motto on top of the avant-corps

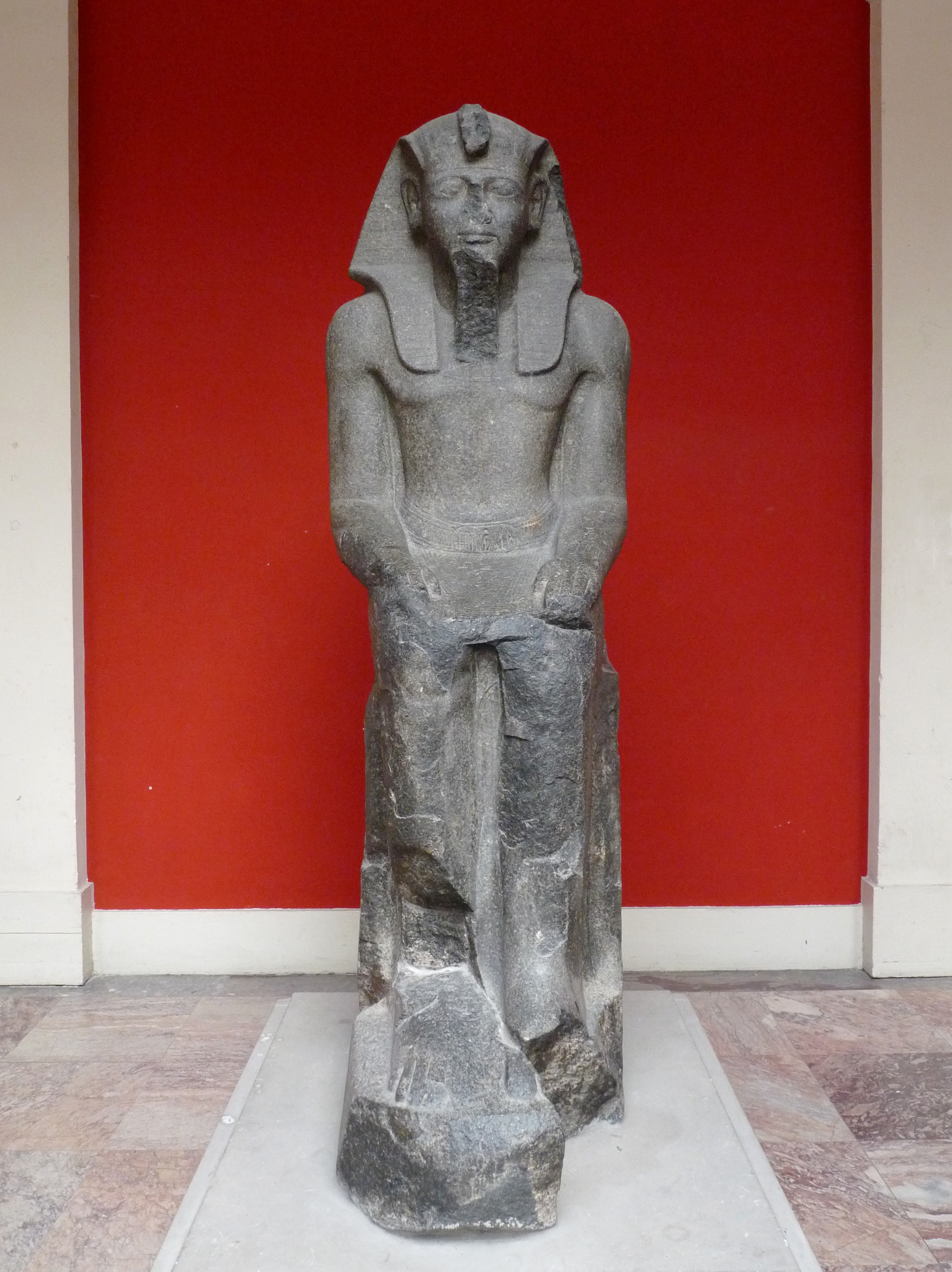
Statues of Ramses II in the Grand hall

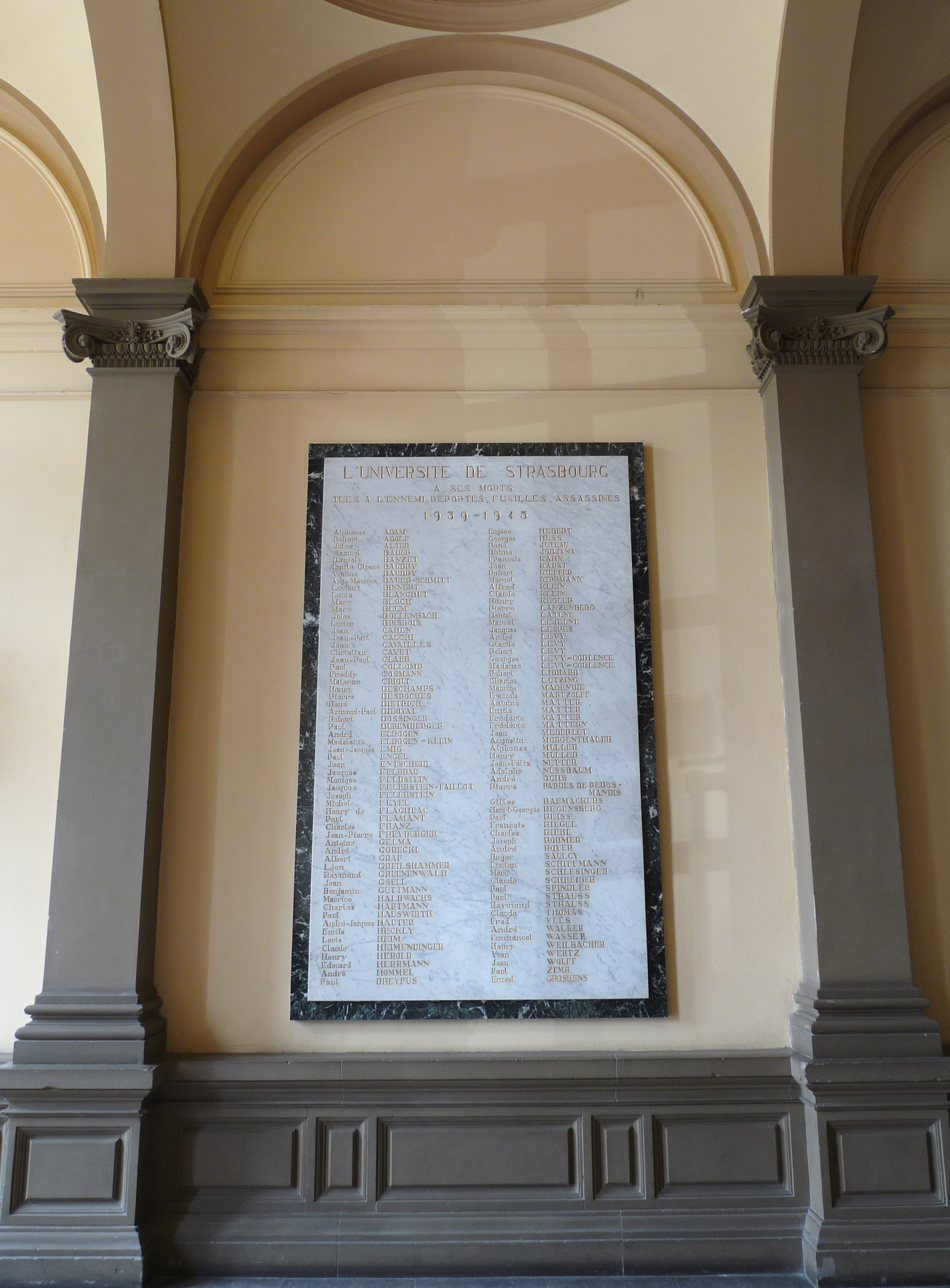
World War II commemorative plaque inside the Palace

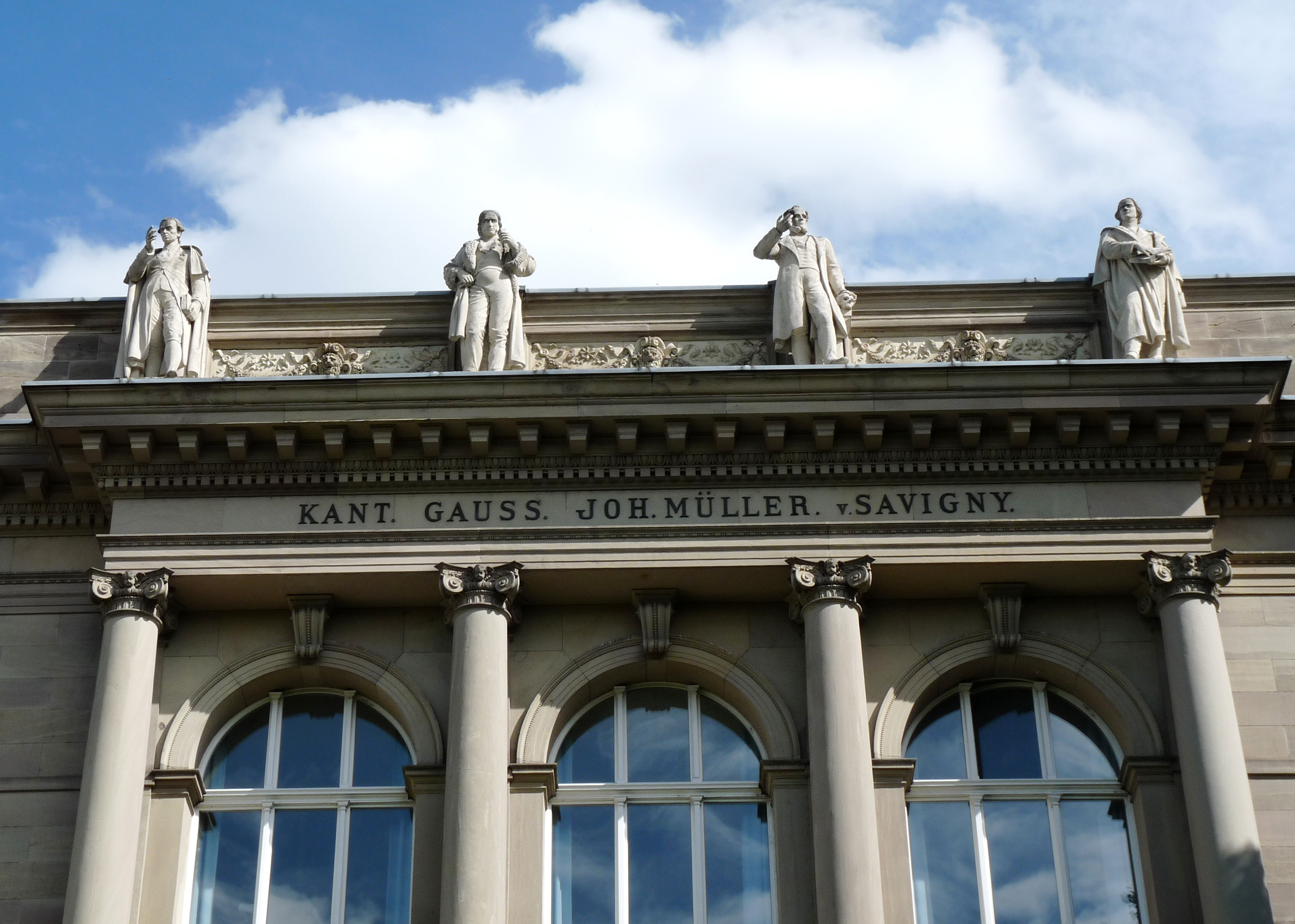
Statues of the scholars Immanuel Kant, Carl Friedrich Gauss, Johannes Peter Müller and Friedrich Carl von Savigny

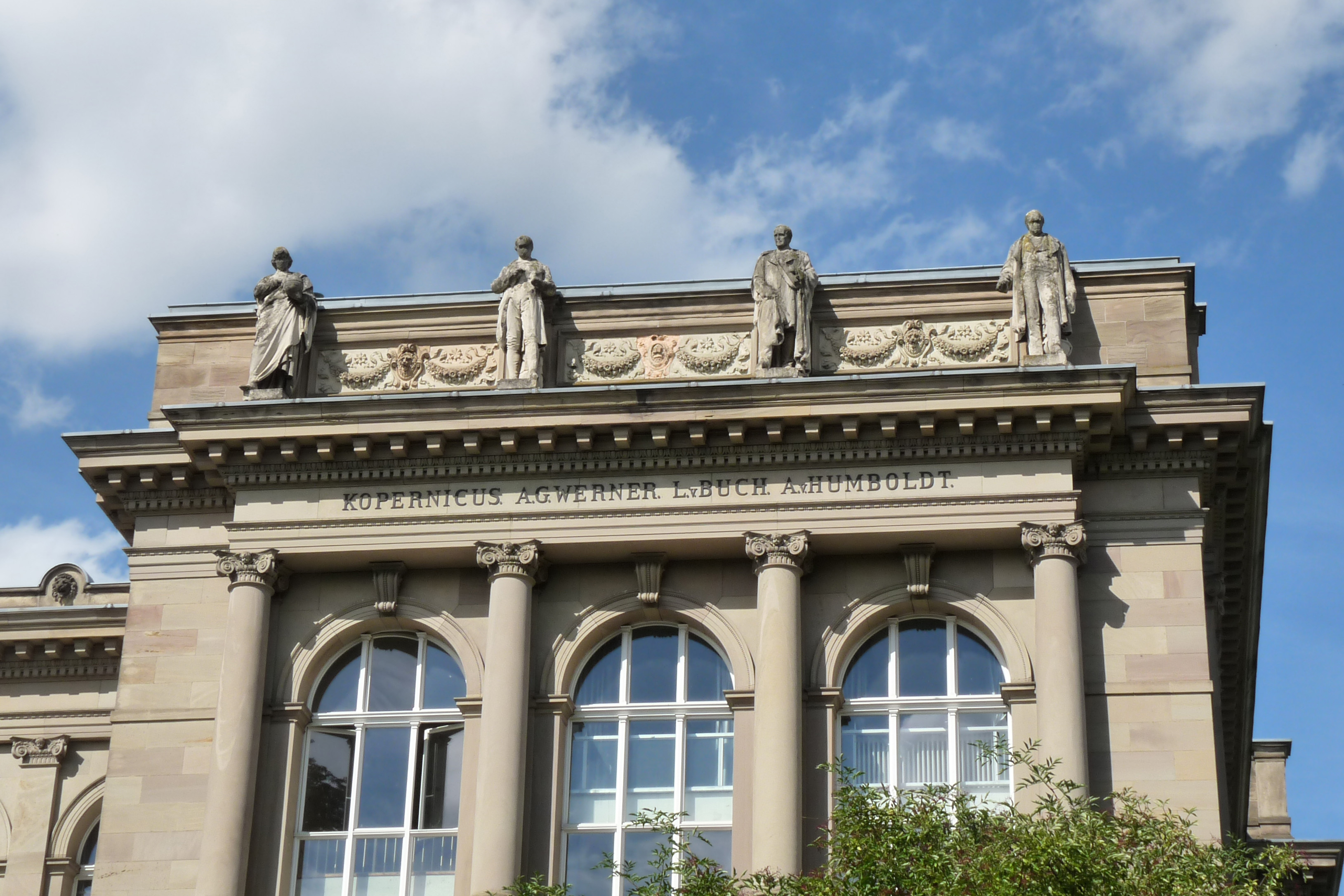
Statues of Nicolaus Copernicus, Abraham Gottlob Werner, Leopold von Buch and Alexander von Humboldt

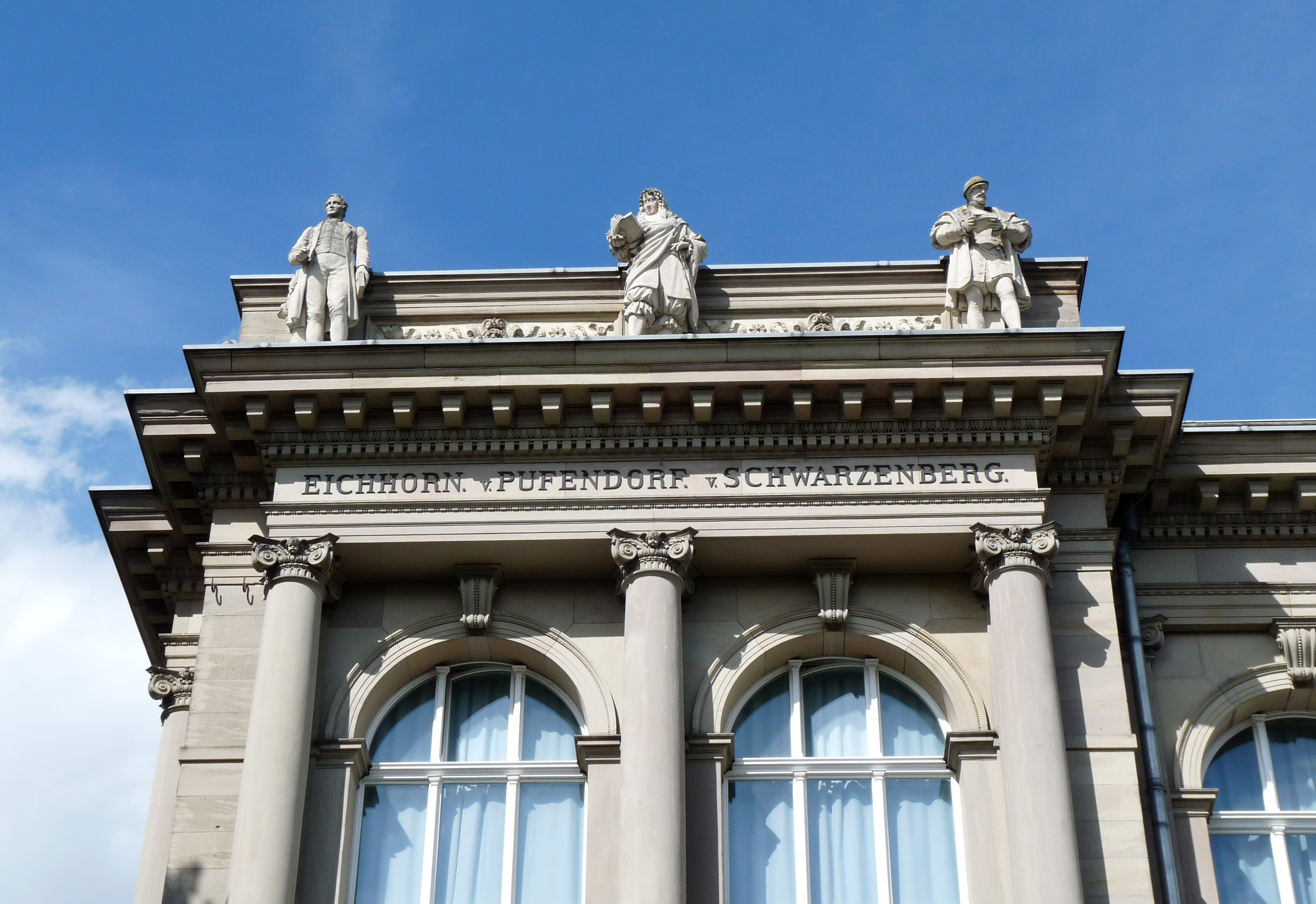
Statues of Karl Friedrich Eichhorn, Samuel von Pufendorf and Johann von Schwarzenberg

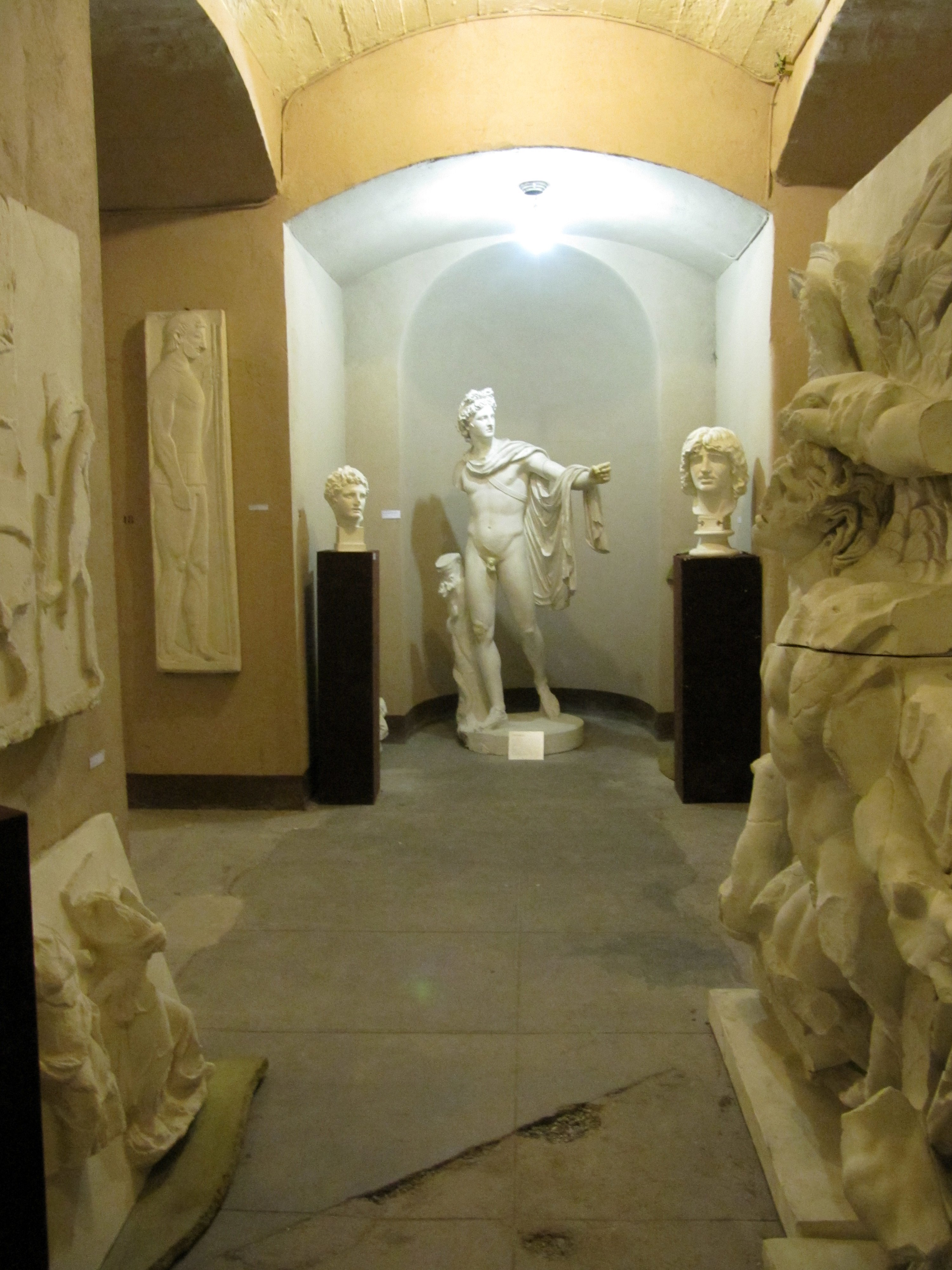
Inside the Gypsothèque below the Palace

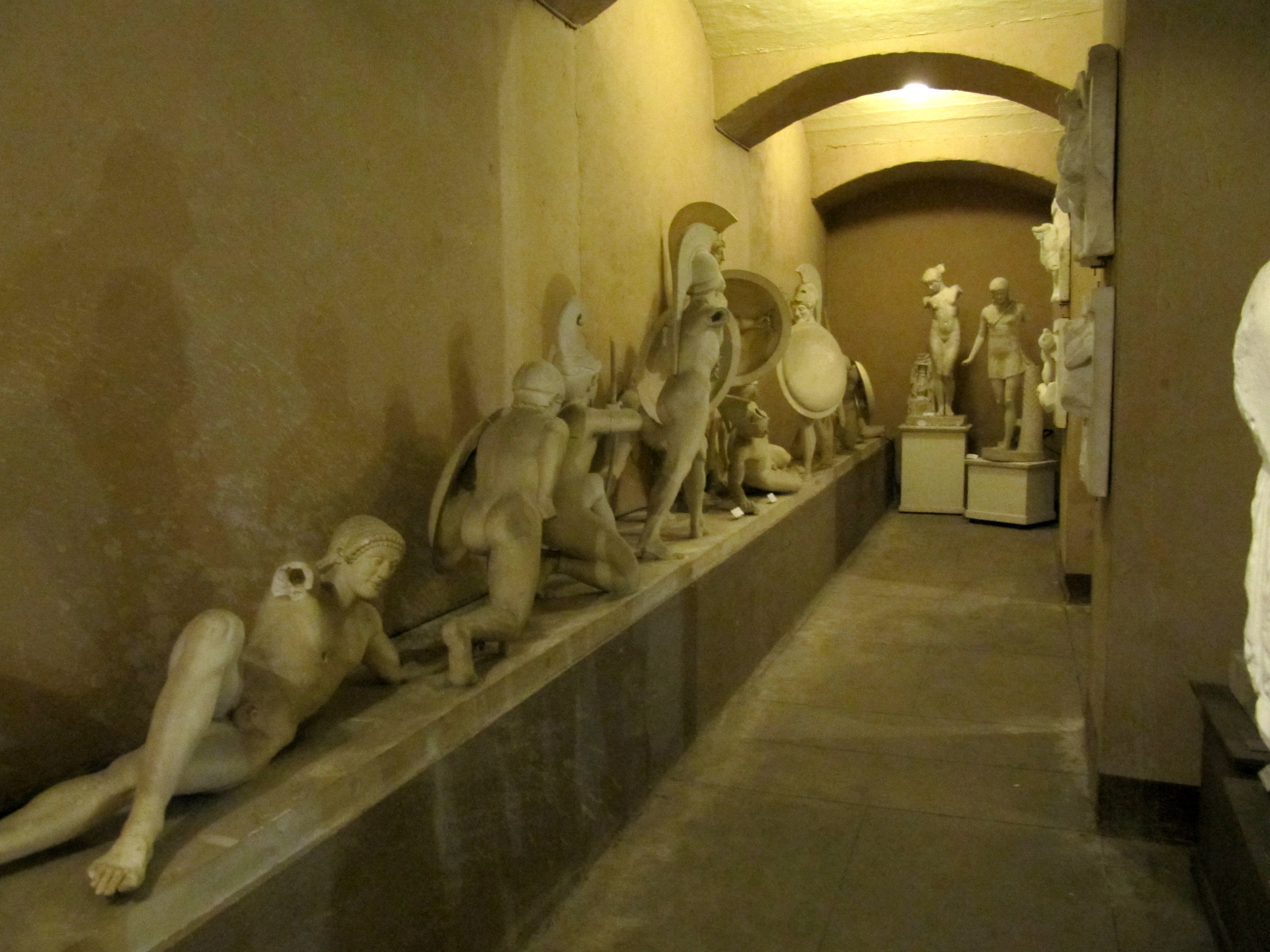
Inside the Gypsothèque below the Palace
