= Villa Garzoni (Pontecasale) =

Building by Jacopo Sansovino

Coordinates: 45.217708°N 11.962818°E

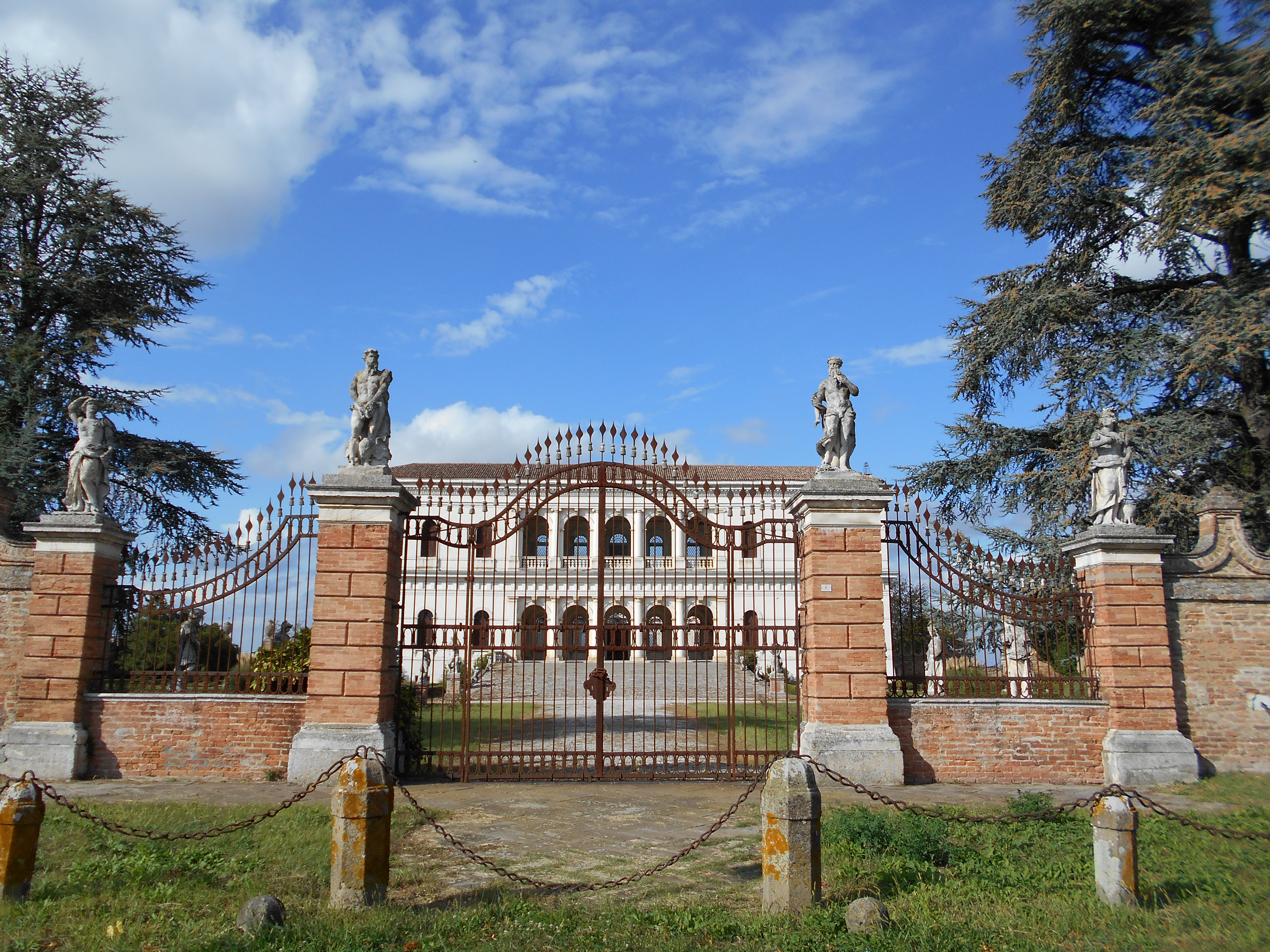
Villa Garzoni

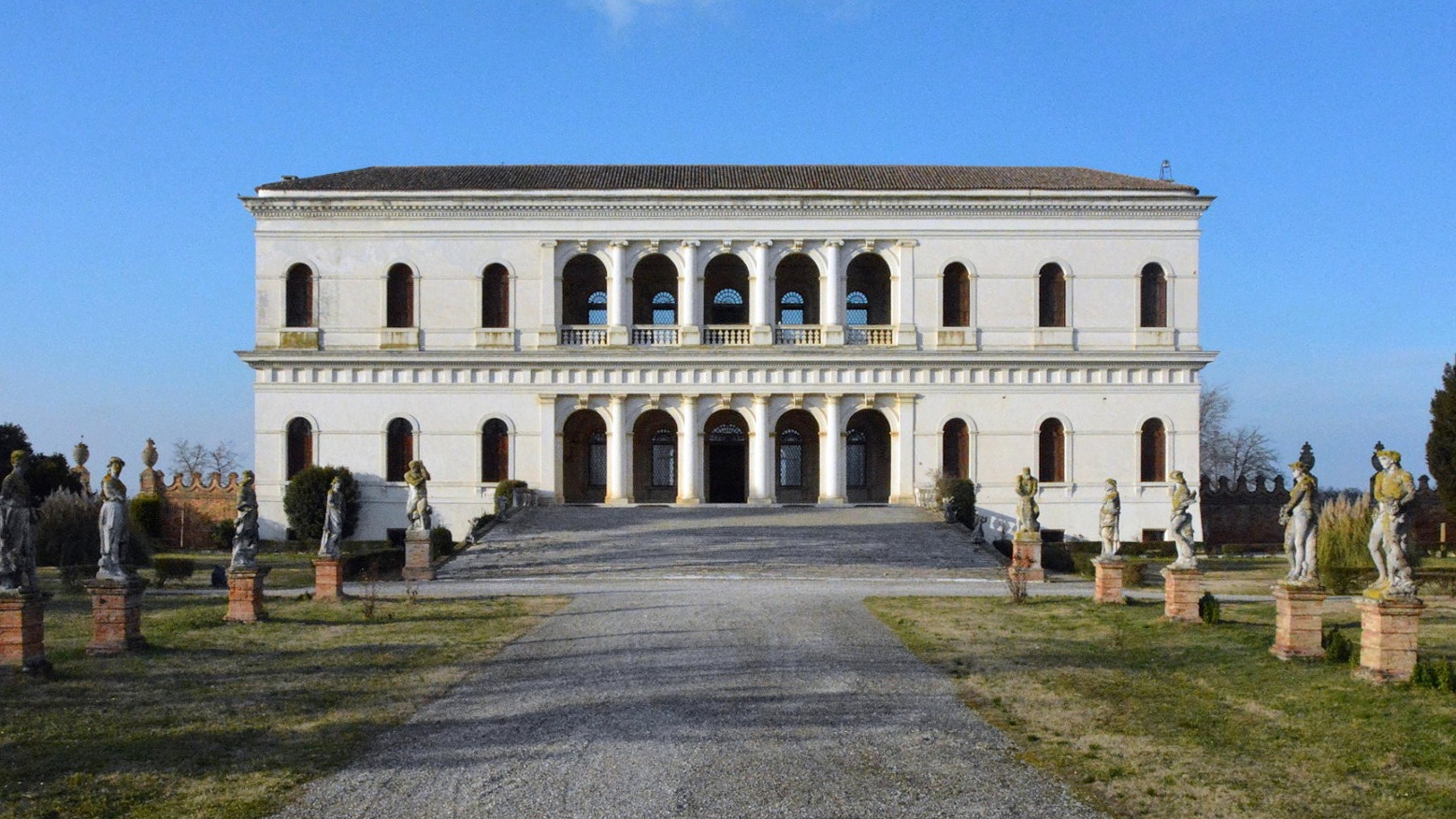
Principal facade

Villa Garzoni is a villa in the Veneto region designed by Jacopo Sansovino around 1540 in Pontecasale, a hamlet in the municipality of Candiana, in the province of Padua.

== History ==
During the 13th century, the Garzoni family of Emilian origins moved to Venice. In 1488 Filippo Garzoni di Natale was elected Guardian grande della Scuola della Misericordia and a few years later Garzone Garzoni di Giovanni obtained citizenship of the Republic of Venice. Thanks to this event, the sons of Garzone become part of the nobility in 1488, through their access to the Maggior Consiglio, while the rest of the descendants obtained no title.

In 1430 the descendants of Garzone, given their social position, established a Venetian bank and acquired wealth, allowing them to build a villa in the Padua area. At the beginning of the 1440s, following the confiscation of lands from Alvise del Verme, the Signoria of Venice put them up for auction. They were acquired by Filippo Garzoni.

Filippo Garzoni's son, Natale Garzoni, built a country residence between the end of the 15th and the beginning of the 16th century. After Natale's death in 1528, his sons Alvise and Girolamo Garzoni replaced the house with a new one, giving the job of designer to Jacopo Sansovino. In 1687 an unknown person published a report of a pastoral visit in which it was stated that the villa was the work of Palladio, although there are no direct documents of his presence in the building site

In 1574 a descendant of the family, Alvise Garzoni, wrote a codicil to the will which represents an indirect source of early contacts between Sansovino and the patrons of the Villa. Documents show that it was Alvise Garzoni himself who contacted Jacopo Sansovino, never mentioned as an architect, asking him to deal with the design and renovation of the villa. In 1518, through the declaration of the tithe, Natale Garzoni speaks of a casa cum suo cortivo referring to the ancient Villa Garzoni, while in 1537 in a letter from Pietro Arentino, addressed to Jacopo Sansovino, the Villa is not included in the list of Sansovino works. The conception of the project for the new Villa Garzoni began between the end of 1540 and the beginning of 1550.

After the death of Alvise Garzoni in 1573, the assets passed by inheritance to his son Vincenzo. Upon his death, having no descendants, Vincenzo named his nephew Marcantonio Michiel as heir. Marcantonio made alterations, such as the oratory, the new entrance gate, the battlements of the enclosing wall and also lengthened of the barchessa from 13 to 64 arches. Upon his death, the villa passed from hand to hand until 1950, the year in which it became a possession of the Carrarettos.

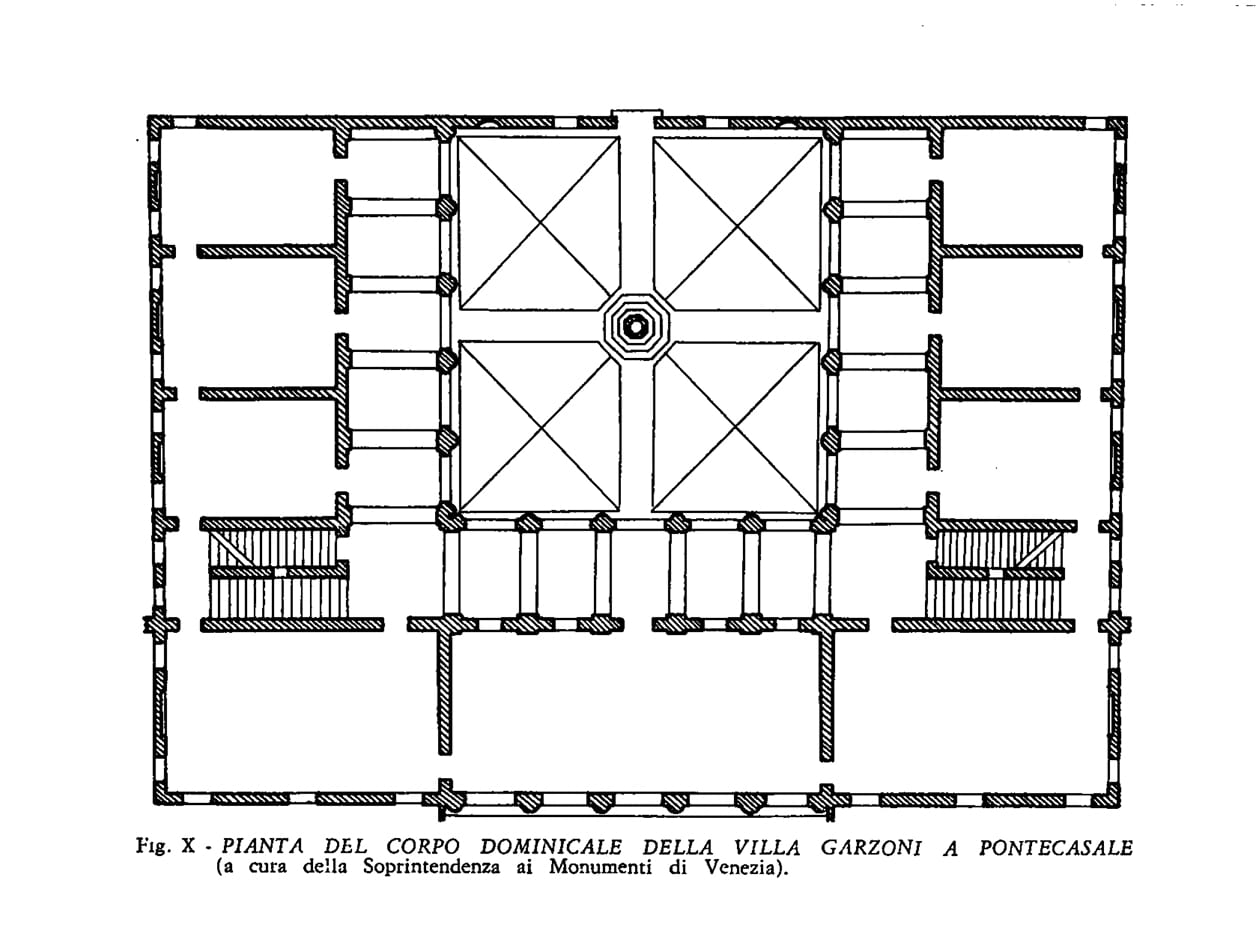
Ground floor plan, Villa Garzoni a Pontecasale

== Description ==
=== Exterior ===
==== Architectural layout ====
The villa is located in an irregular plot surrounded entirely by a wall; the main facade is positioned to the south and access to the property has a large gate, on the sides of which are two pillars surmounted by statues, which opens onto an avenue to the entrance. The villa is arranged with loggias on three sides.

The main facade has two levels above a slightly raised basement, in the center of which is a portico that leads inside the villa. The facade uses horizontal elements to unify the composition. The two side elevations are continuations of the ends of the main facade.

==== Interior court ====
The internal courtyard is surrounded on three sides by loggias, with the north side bounded by a wall which separates the inside of the villa from the grounds. The loggias that surround the courtyard are supported with engaged Doric columns. The south portico overlooks the internal courtyard. The loggia is surmounted by a terrace overlooked by the rooms on the second floor. The villa's roofs and courts feed a central cistern.

==== Gardens ====
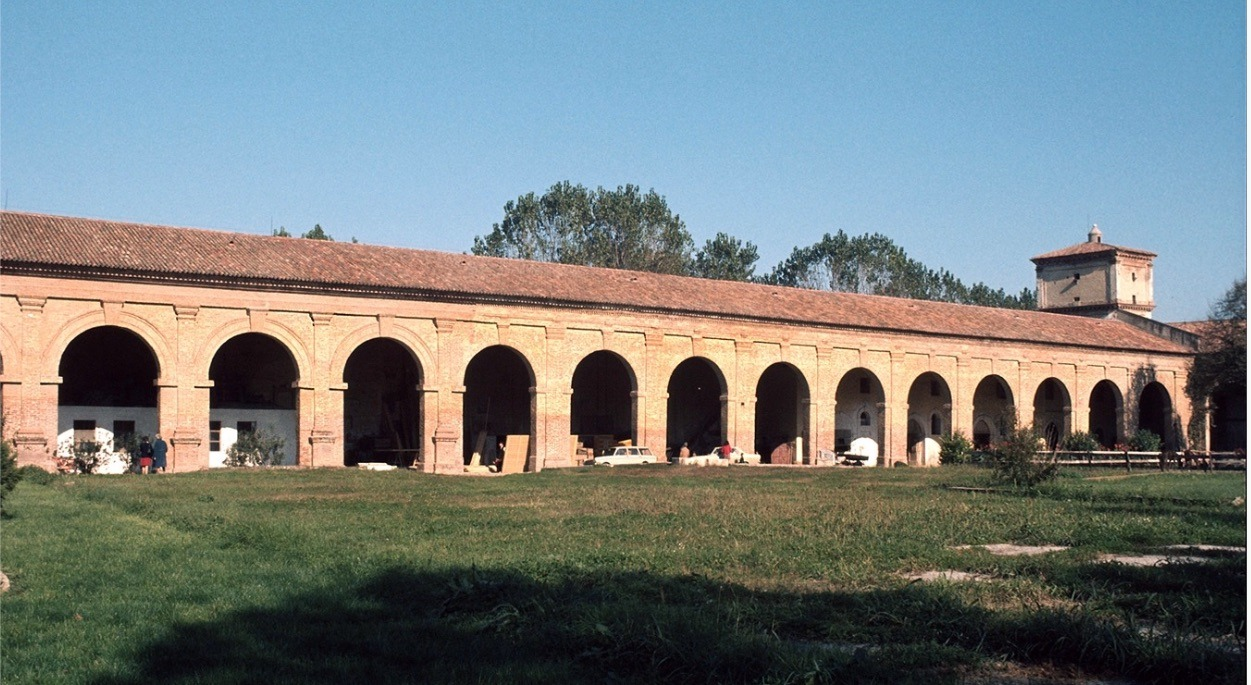
Barchessa

A barchessa, an arcaded loggia containing service areas for the grounds and fields, runs to the east of the villa.

=== Interior ===
Despite the richness of the exteriors, the interior of the villa is much more traditional than the porch, courtyard and facade.

The ground floor structure is organized so that it connects directly to the outside. The ground floor is organized into four communicating rooms with two symmetrical staircases that lead to the upper floor and a red marble portal. On the first floor of the villa are three rooms arranged across the front, communicating directly with the terrace. All the rooms of Villa Garzoni, as well as the portico and loggias, are vaulted. The decoration is probably contemporary with the external elements. Sansovino designed the four minor fireplaces of the rooms on the main floor, two of which were designed and sculpted by Sansovino.

The "Salone di Caccia" has a plaster relief in a hunting theme. Below that is a fireplace with an architrave supported by two male nudes probably by Sansovino. The Salone del Camino is decorated with floral and zoomorphic motifs.

Little remains of the pictorial decoration. The vaulting was altered in the late eighteenth century by the Venetian Francesco Galimberti.

== Bibliography ==
- Margherita Azzi Visentini, La villa in Italia: Quattrocento e Cinquecento, Milano, Electa, 1995
- Bruno Brunelli Bonetti, Le ville della provincia di Padova in: Le ville venete a cura di Giuseppe Mazzotti, Treviso, Libreria editrice Canova, 1952
- Adolfo Callegari, Il palazzo Garzoni a Ponte Casale, in «Dedalo», VI (1925), pp. 569–598
- Manuela Morresi, Jacopo Sansovino, Electa, 2000
- Vittorio Moschini, La villa Garzoni del Sansovino a Pontecasale, in «L'arte», XXXIII (1930), fasc. 6., pp. 532–539
- Laura Pittoni, La castaldia di Ponte Casale, in «Rassegna d'arte», IX (1909), pp. 48–50
- Mercedes Precerutti Garberi, Affreschi settecenteschi delle ville venete, Milano, Silvana, 1968
- Lionello Puppi, La villa Garzoni a Pontecasale di Jacopo Sansovino, in «Prospettive», XI (1961), n. 24, pp. 51–63
- Lionello Puppi, Minuzia archivistica per la villa Garzoni di Jacopo Sansovino, in «Antichità viva», XIII (1974), settembre-ottobre, pp. 63–64
- Lionello Puppi, La villa Garzoni ora Carraretto a Pontecasale di Jacopo Sansovino, in «Bollettino del CISA Andrea Palladio», XI (1969), pp. 95–112
- Bernhard Rupprecht, Die Villa Garzoni das Jacopo Sansovino, in «Mitteilungen des Kunsthistorischen Institutes in Florenz», XI (1963-1965), pp. 1–32
- Gianfranco Scarpari, Le ville venete. Dalle mirabili architetture del Palladio alle grandiose dimore del Settecento: un itinerario affascinante e suggestivo nel “verde” di una terra ricca di antiche tradizioni, Roma, Newton Compton editori, 1980
- Manfredo Tufari, Diego Birelli, Jacopo Sansovino e l'architettura del '500 a Venezia, Padova, Marsilio, 1969
- Nicoletta Zucchello, Ville Venete: la provincia di Padova, Venezia, Marsilio, 2001, pp. 93–94
