= Barchessa =

Rural service building

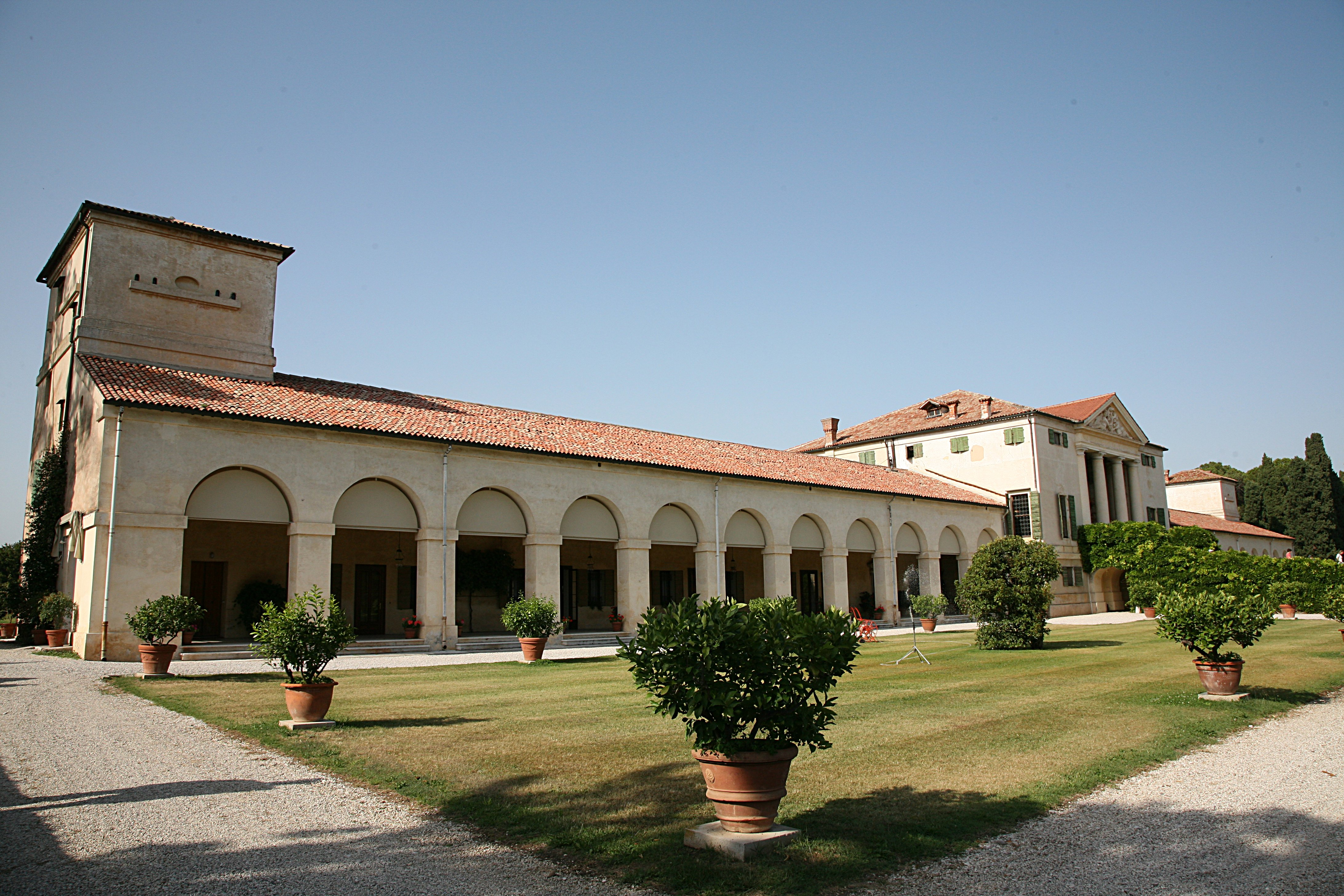
The left barchessa of the Villa Emo a Fanzolo di Vedelago. At the left end there is a dovecote.

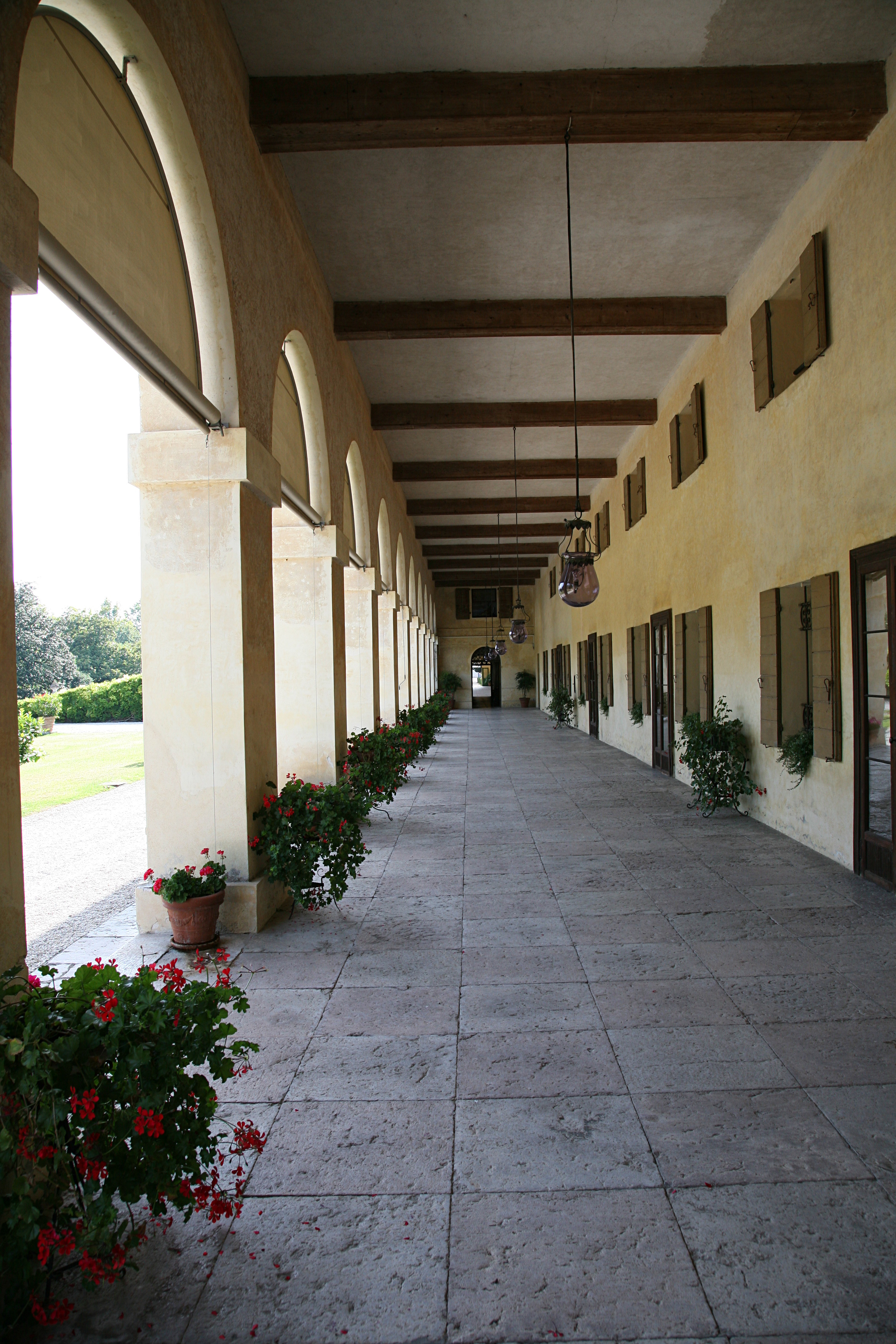
The barchessa of the Villa Emo

A barchessa is a rural service building, typical of the architecture of Venetian villas. The concept was created and popularized by architect Andrea Palladio. A barchessa contains the working portions of the estate, separately from the central body of the villa. Barchessas were characterized by a long arcade with high round arches and used for services including kitchens, farm staff, stables, and barns. As interpreted outside of Italy, the barchessas (barchesse in Italian) evolved to become defining elements of Palladian architecture.

== Description ==
In the historical region of the Republic of Venice the barchessas are almost always are arranged on either side of the main house, and are an integral part of a large productive agricultural complex. Andrea Palladio gave architectural dignity to the barchesse, placing them side by side, aligning them and connecting them to the manor house, giving the whole greater symmetry and monumentality. The orientation was also important: in his I quattro libri dell'architettura (Venice, 1570), Palladio states that the barchesse should face south to keep the stored hay from fermenting and burning.

In the Veneto countryside – and in particular along the riviera del Brenta – barchessas may be found without a villa: due to the taxation on villas. During the 19th century many buildings of the Venetian patriciate were demolished, leaving only the barchessas, useful as cottages or warehouses.

== Examples ==
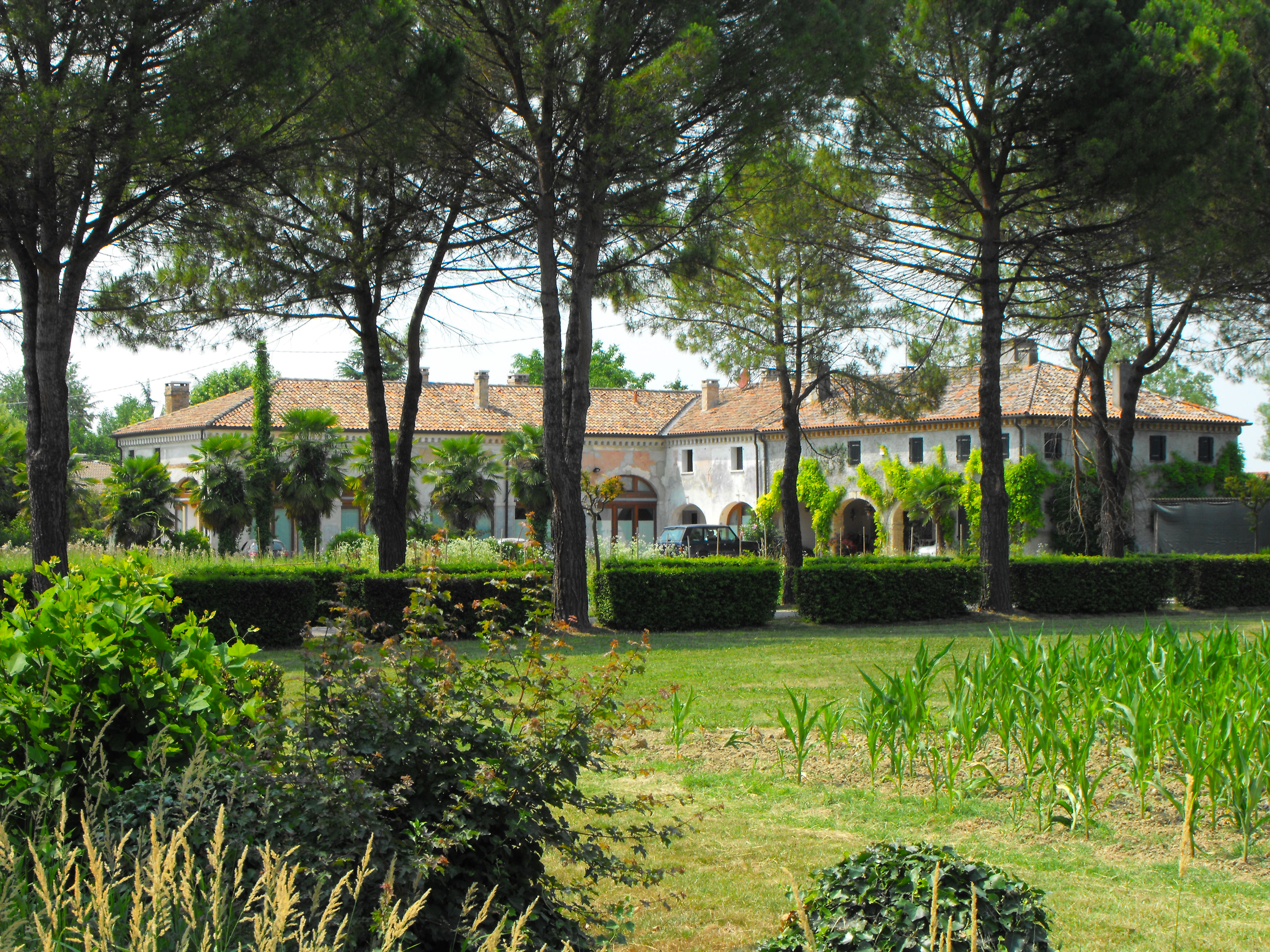
Villa Algarotti as it appears today: only the barchessa remains of the building

Among the most famous and characteristic barchesse there are those combined with the following villas:

- Villa Badoer, known as "la Badoera", designed by Andrea Palladio, in the municipality of Fratta Polesine, province of Rovigo (the only villa in which Palladio actually built his idea of curved hemicycle barns).
- Villa Tiretta Agostini, Giavera del Montello (Province of Treviso).
- Villa Emo Capodilista in Fanzolo di Vedelago (province of Treviso), by Andrea Palladio
- Villa Barbaro in Maser, (province of Treviso), by Andrea Palladio, at the ends of which are dovecotes and sundials.
- Villa Manin in Passariano di Codroipo (Province of Udine) where the treaty of Campoformio (now Campoformido) was signed
- Villa Contarini in Piazzola sul Brenta (province of Padua)
- Villa Albrizzi Franchetti, designed by Andrea Pagnossin, in San Trovaso (municipality of Preganziol in the province of Treviso).

Or the single barchesse, today without the villa:

- Barco della Regina Cornaro in Altivole (Treviso)
- Barchessa Loredan in Volpago del Montello (Treviso)
- Barchessa of Villa Grollo in Selva del Montello of Volpago del Montello (Treviso)
- Barco Barbarigo Biagi to Montebelluna
- Barchess of Villa Thiene to Cicogna of Villafranca Padovana (A. Palladio)
- Barchesse of Villa Valmarana in Mira along the Riviera del Brenta
- Barchessa di Villa Pola known as the "Barcòn" after Barcòn of Vedelago (Treviso)
- Barchess of Villa Monza in Dueville (Vicenza)
- Barchessa of Villa Badoer, known as "La Rotonda" of Badoere of Morgan, Treviso)
- Barchess of Villa Monselicense by Davide Boetto

== Gallery ==
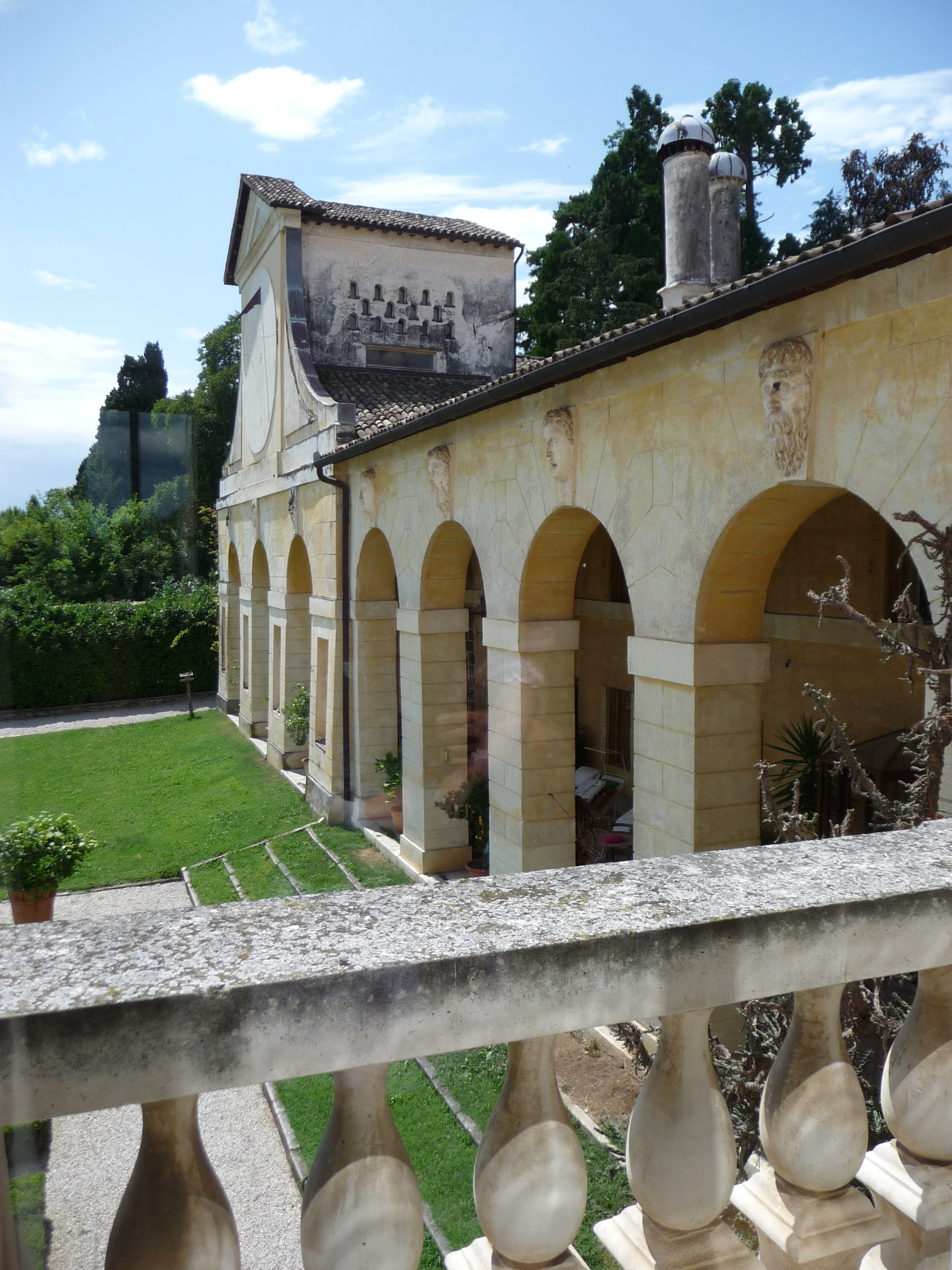
The left barchessa of Villa Barbaro a Maser

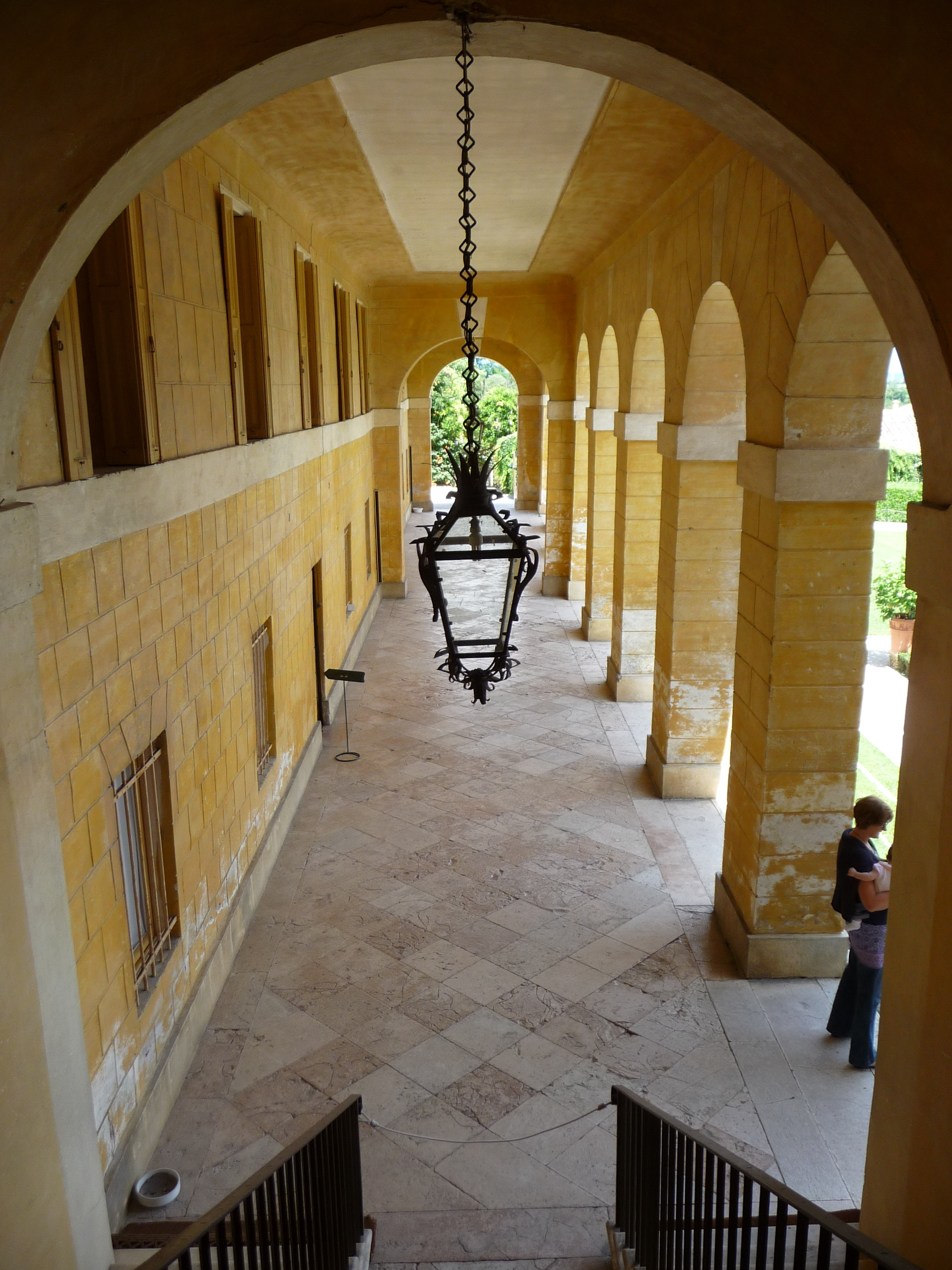
The right barchessa of the Villa Barbaro

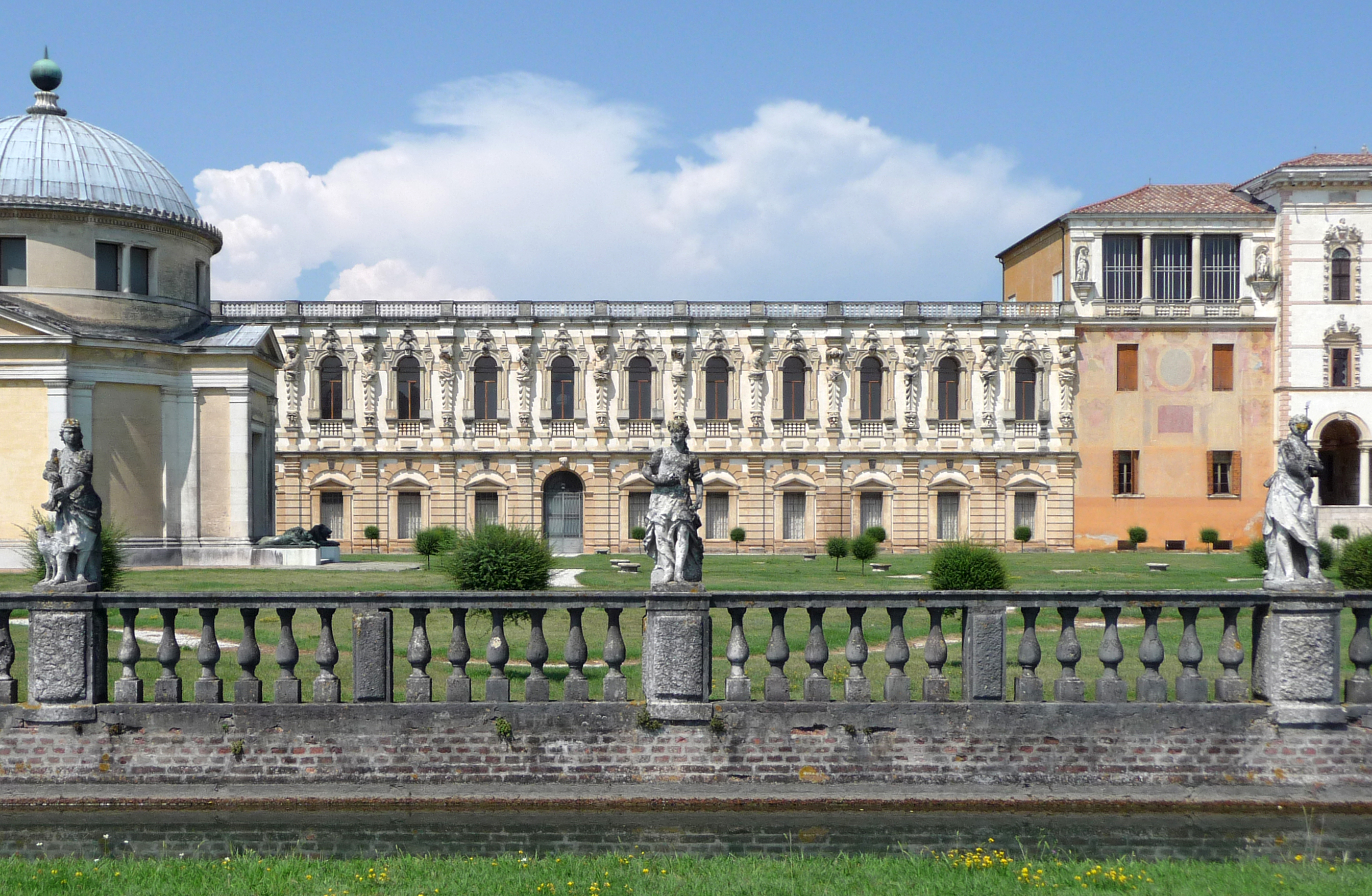
Left barchessa of the Villa Contarini in Piazzola sul Brenta

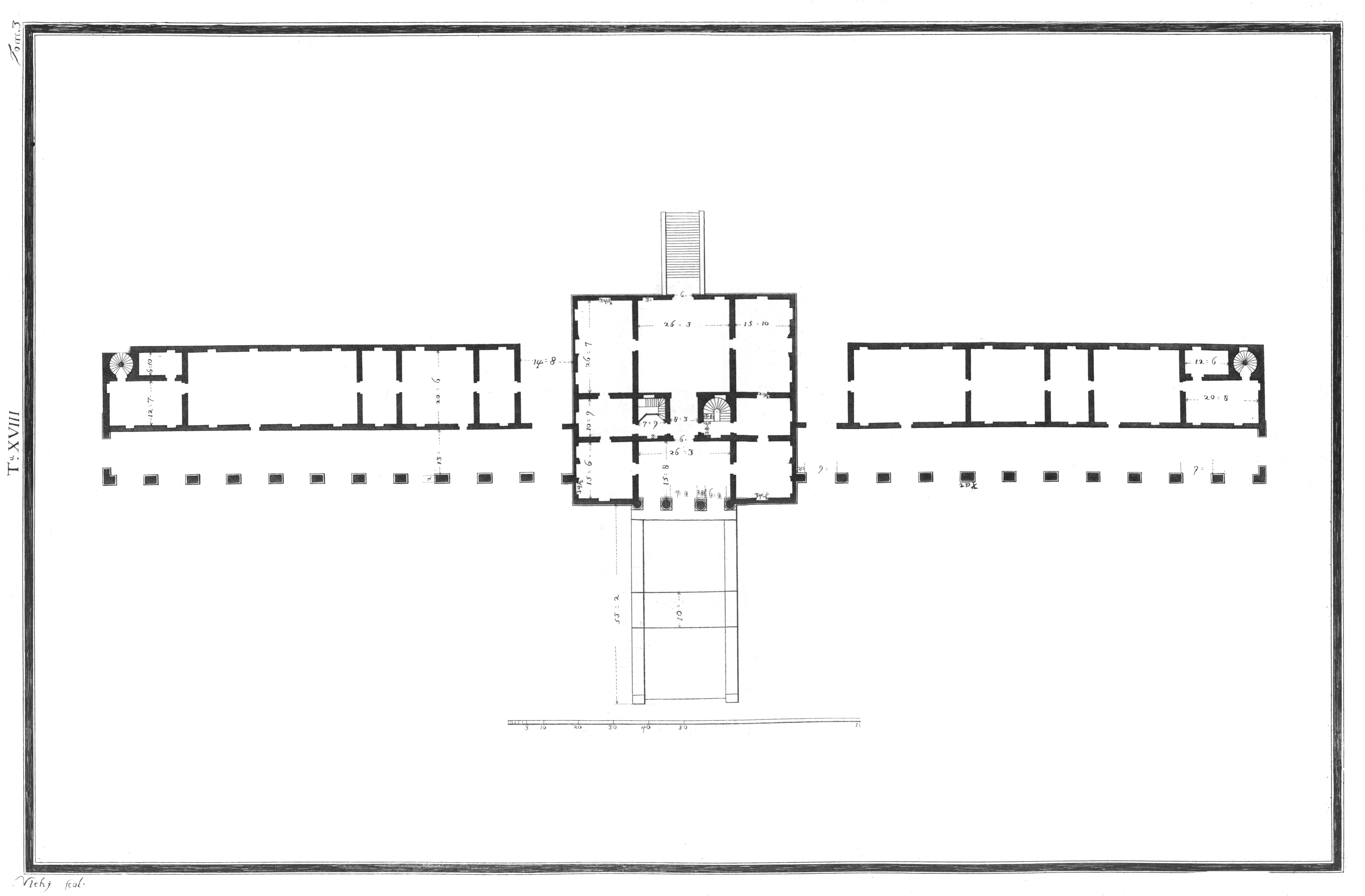
Plan of the Villa Emo. The main house is in the center, flanked by the barchesse (drain by Ottavio Bertotti Scamozzi, 1781)

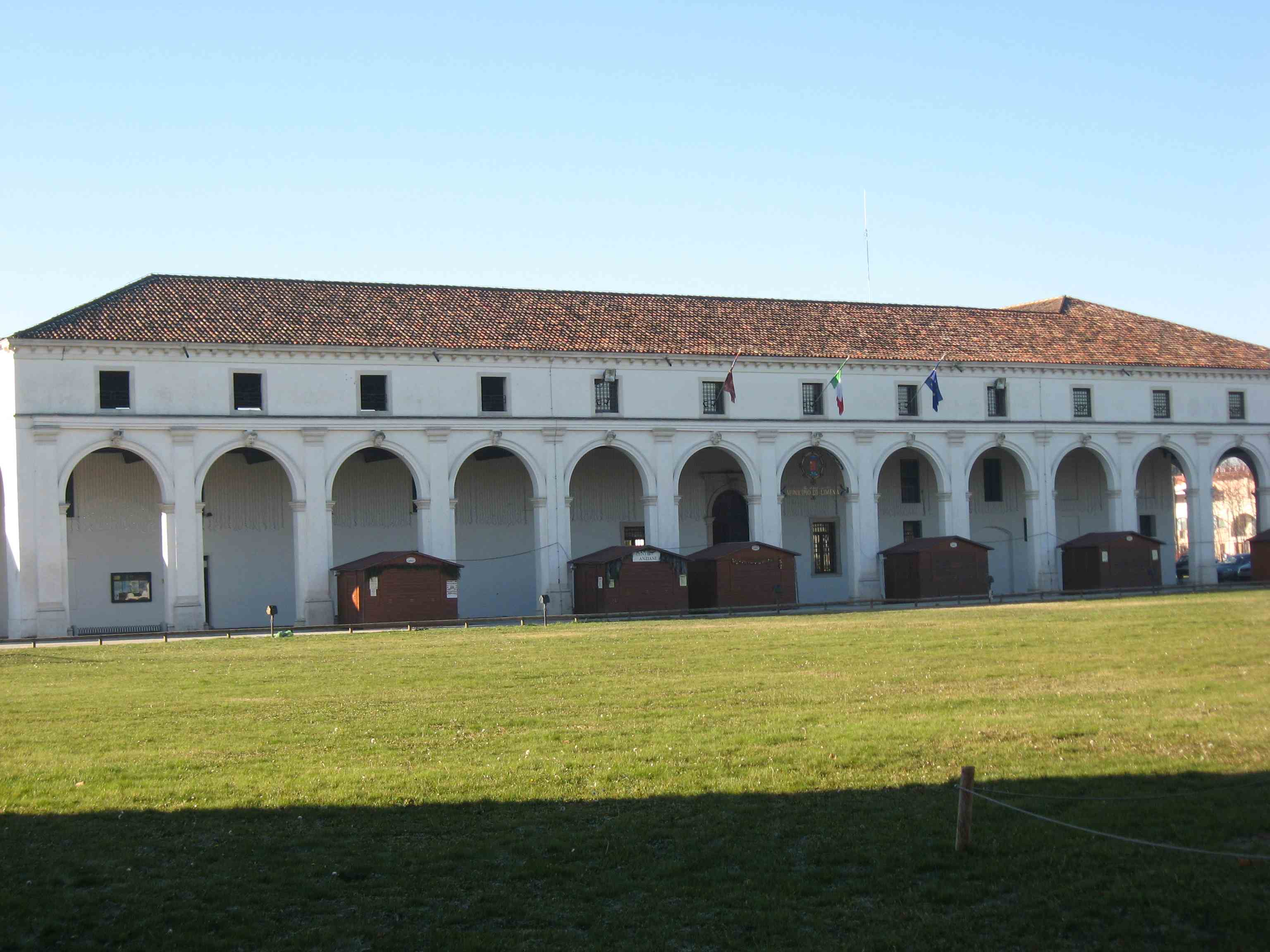
Barchessa di Limena (Padova), oggi sede del Municipio

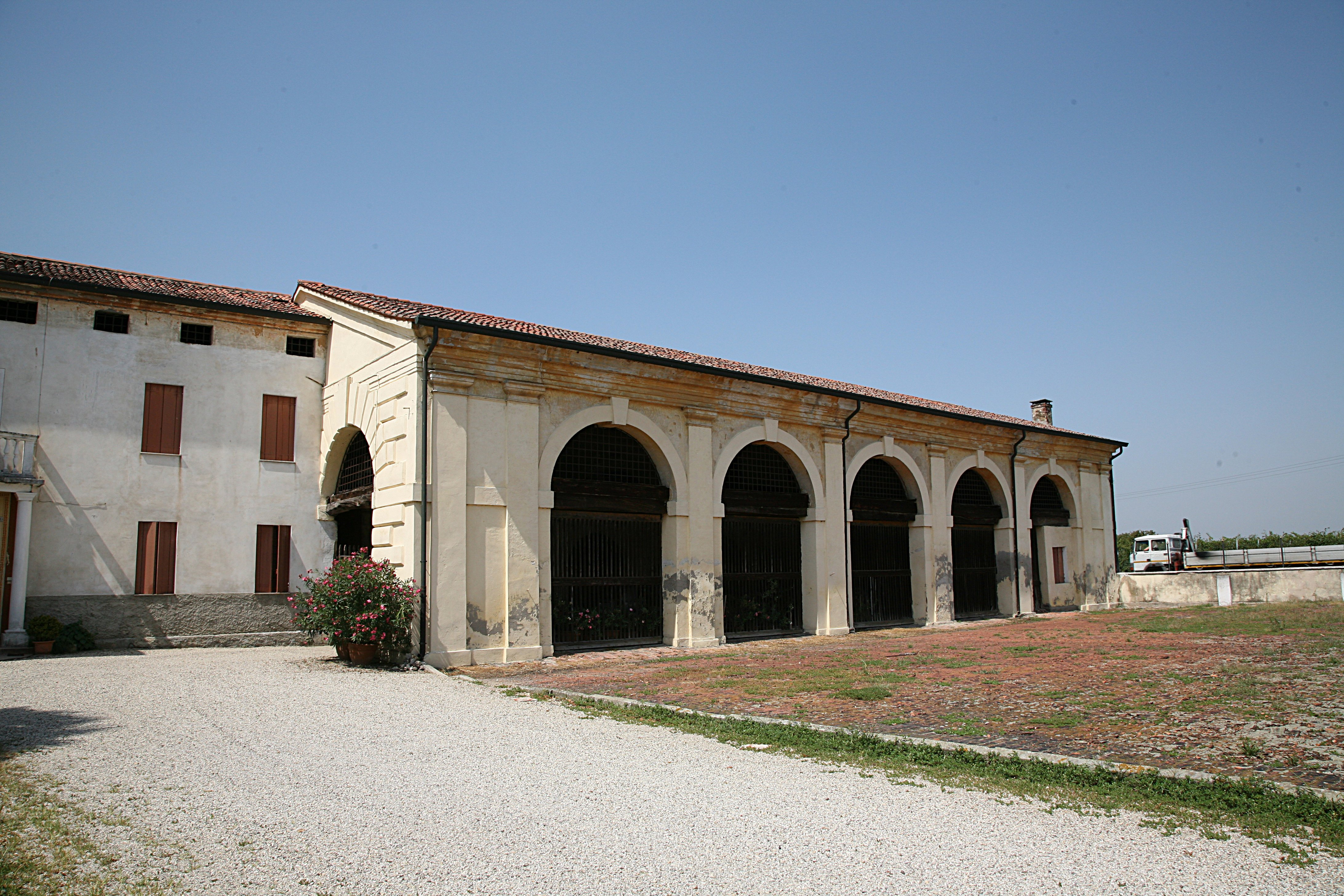
Barchessa of the Villa Thiene in Cicogna, the only remnant of a Palladian project
