= Collodi (Italy) =

Village in Tuscany, Italy

- Village
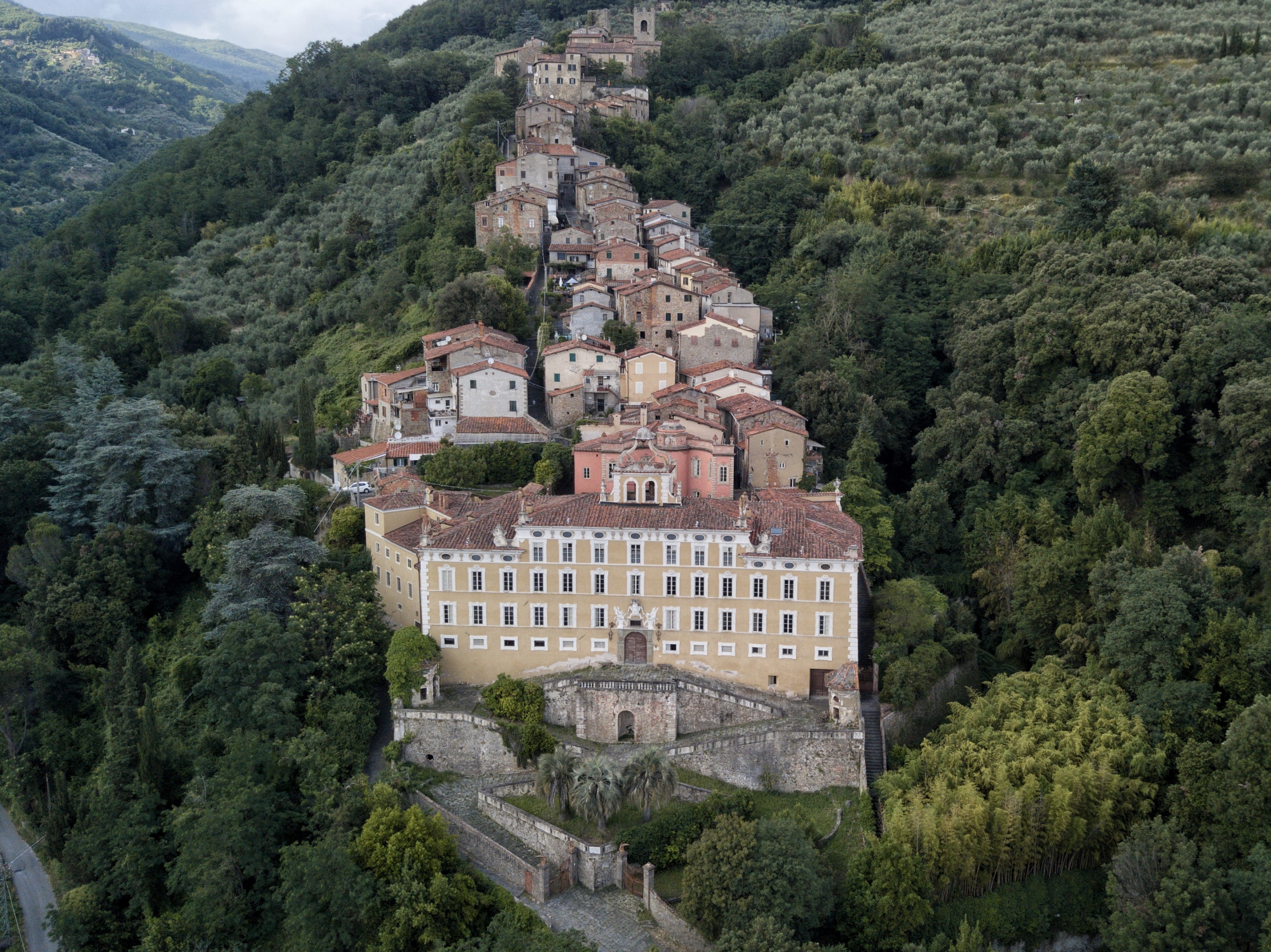
- Villa Garzoni with the ancient village behind
- Interactive map of Collodi
- Coordinates: 43°54′00″N 10°39′10″E
- Country: Italy
- Region: Tuscany
- Municipality: Pescia

Collodi is a part of the municipality of Pescia in the Tuscany region of central Italy.

It is a medieval village documented since the 12th century. It is known for its link to Carlo Lorenzini, who used the pen name Carlo Collodi and wrote The Adventures of Pinocchio. The writer, who was born in Florence and lived most of his life there, spent part of his childhood in the village and adopted its name for his literary career.

The village has an ancient fortress and the aristocratic Villa Garzoni, which has a major garden. The economy of the village is based on tourism, thanks largely to a park dedicated to Pinocchio.

== View ==
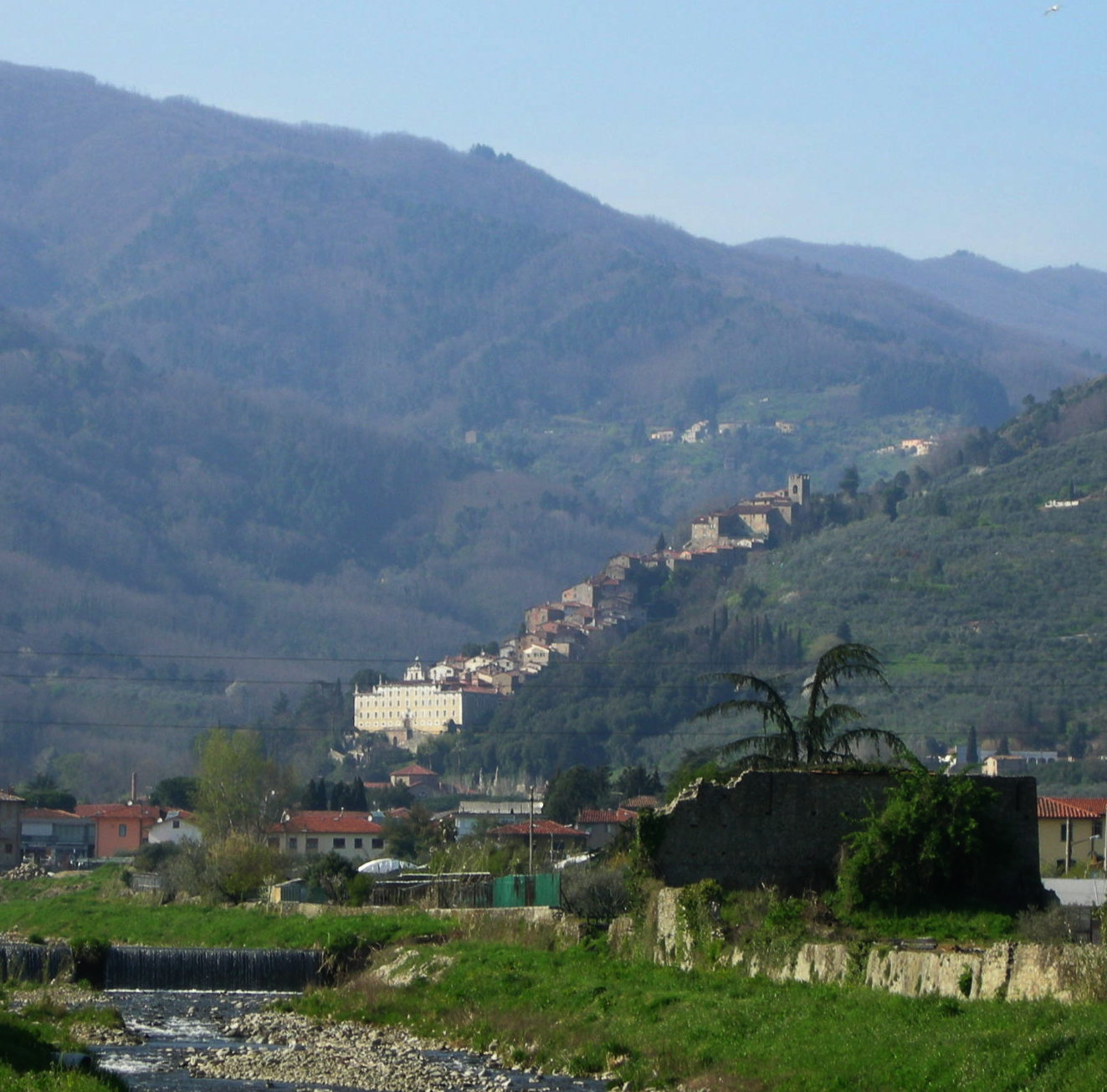
View of Collodi from Pescia

== Nearby ==
- Villa Garzoni
- Pinocchio Park
