= Palazzo Garzoni =

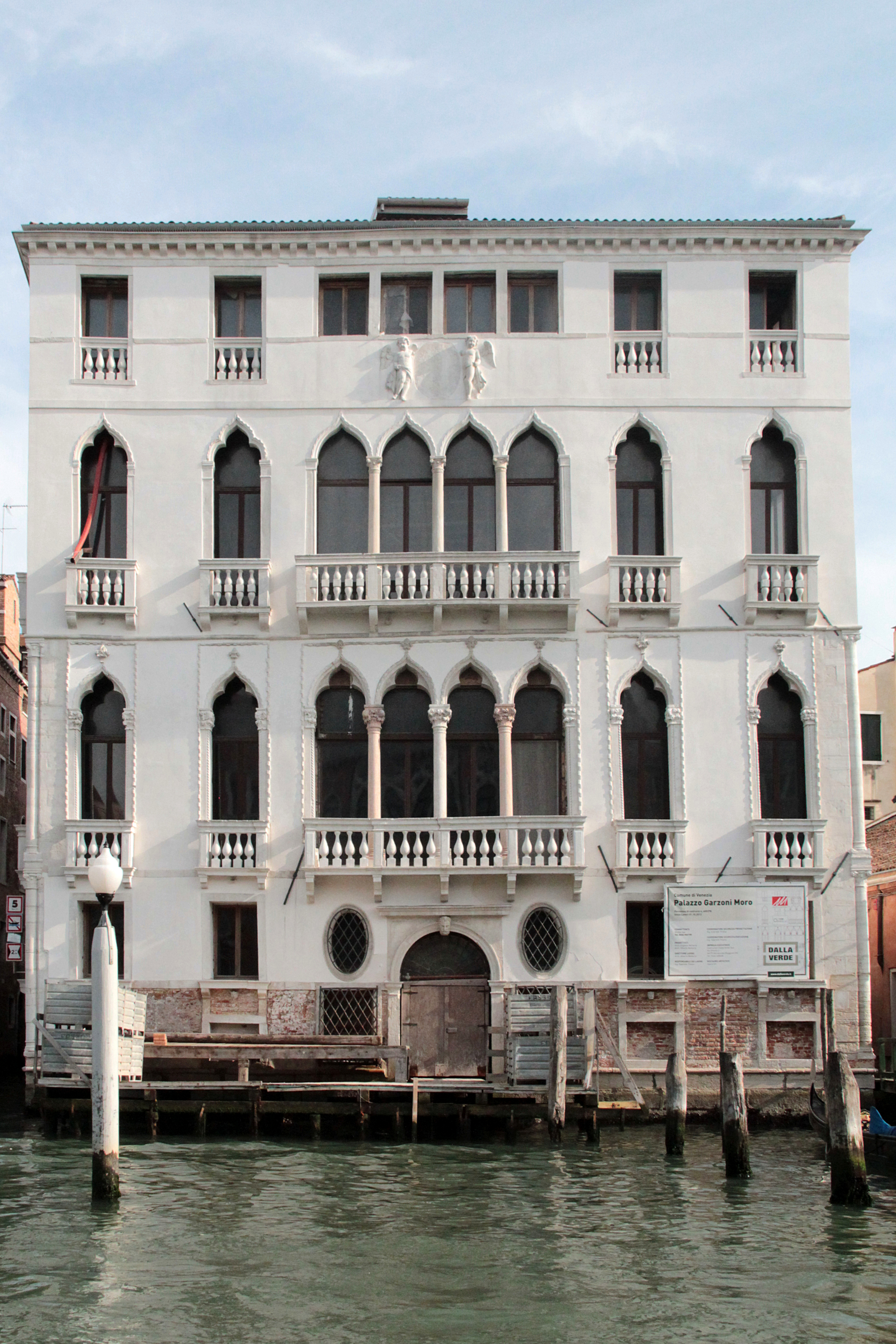
The Palazzo Garzoni, a 15th century Gothic palace (restored and redesigned several times) built on the left bank of the Grand Canal in Venice.

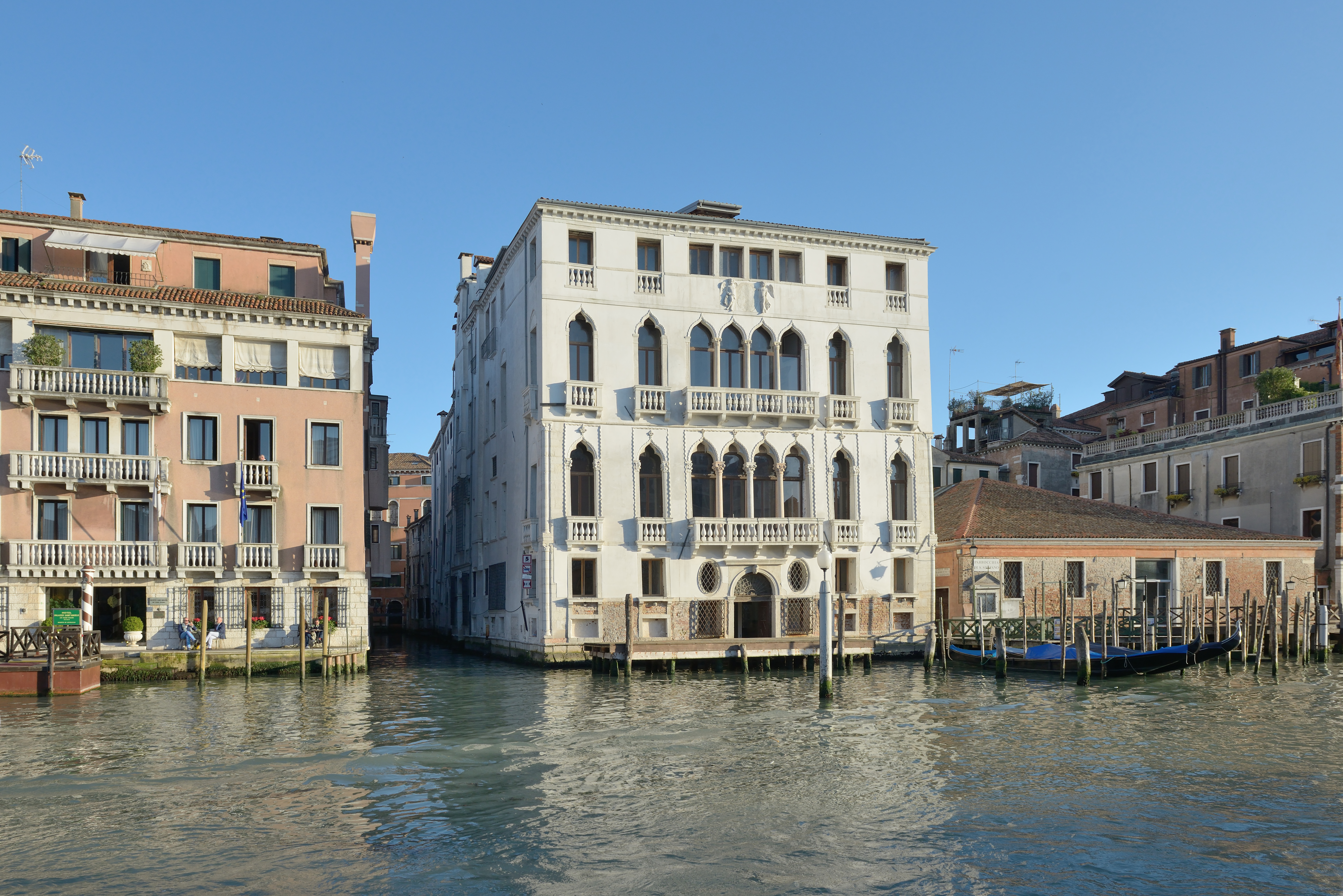
View of Palazzo Garzoni from the Canal Grande, on the left Rio di Ca' Garzoni

The Palazzo Garzoni is Gothic-style palace located on the Grand Canal, in the Sestieri of San Marco, adjacent to the Fondaco Marcello, in Venice, Italy.

== History ==
The palace was erected in the 15th century. The aristocrat Pietro Garzoni had a famous library.
