= Villa Garzoni (Collodi) =

Building in Collodi, Italy

Coordinates: 43°53′59.93″N 10°39′11.92″E

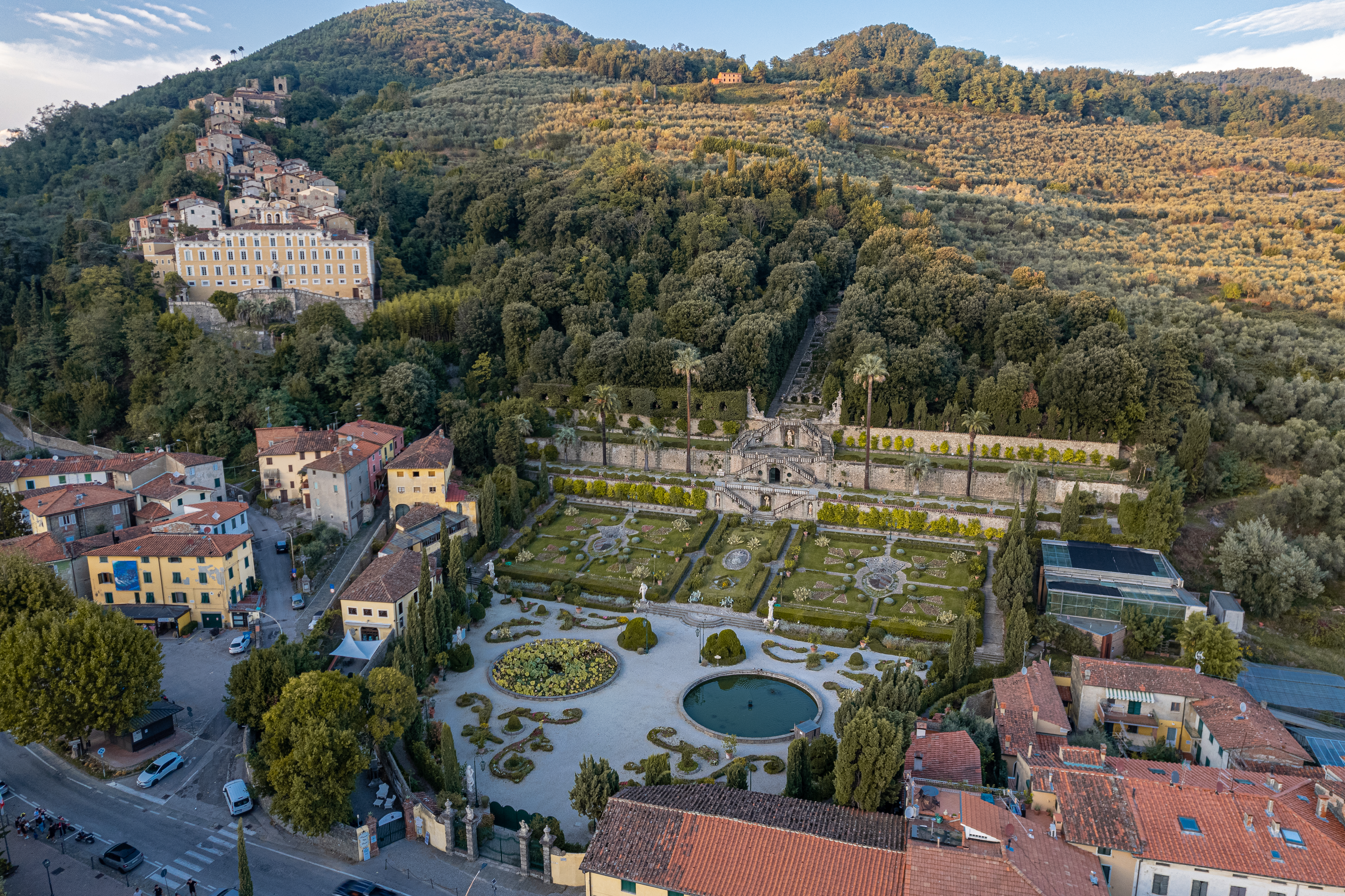
Villa Garzoni

Villa Garzoni at Collodi is a villa in Pescia, province of Pistoia (Tuscany, Italy). The garden was built shortly before 1652 by the Garzoni family, relating to the site of the old castle, which stands slightly apart, closely associated with the village that nestles round it, on the edge of a clifflike slope, which had been chosen in earlier times for its defensible approach. The garden of Villa Garzoni, whose layout "makes the fullest use of a precipitous hillside site in a manner that is usually associated with Rome", features giochi d'aqua, or a water garden, constructed at the foot of a series of balustraded terraces and a suite of grand symmetrical staircases connecting the lower water gardens at the base of the hill, with the house, the cascade, the teatro di verdura and other garden features above. At each terrace level, side walk past fantastically clipped yew blend imperceptibly with the wooded slope. Its cascade, which the exigencies of the site prevented from alignment with the main axis, has been called one of two "culminating High Baroque statements" of the trends toward drama and spectacle. The garden designers of Potsdam, Fontainebleau, and Versailles had influences from these gardens and has earned its fame across the European continent.

The gardens were originally laid out by 1652, and were completed during the course of the century, at the end of which they were already famous. When Filippo Juvarra found himself at Lucca in 1714, he made a rapid bravura pen-and-ink sketch for a scenographic enlargement of the Palazzina dell'Orologio (the Clock Casino) that remained on paper as one of his many off-the-cuff pensieri. The water garden was added in 1786 by Ottavio Diodati, a local architect. The villa, which was thoroughly rebuilt in the eighteenth century, belonged to the Garzoni family until the beginning of the twentieth century.
