= Volpago del Montello =

- Comune
- Comune di Volpago del Montello
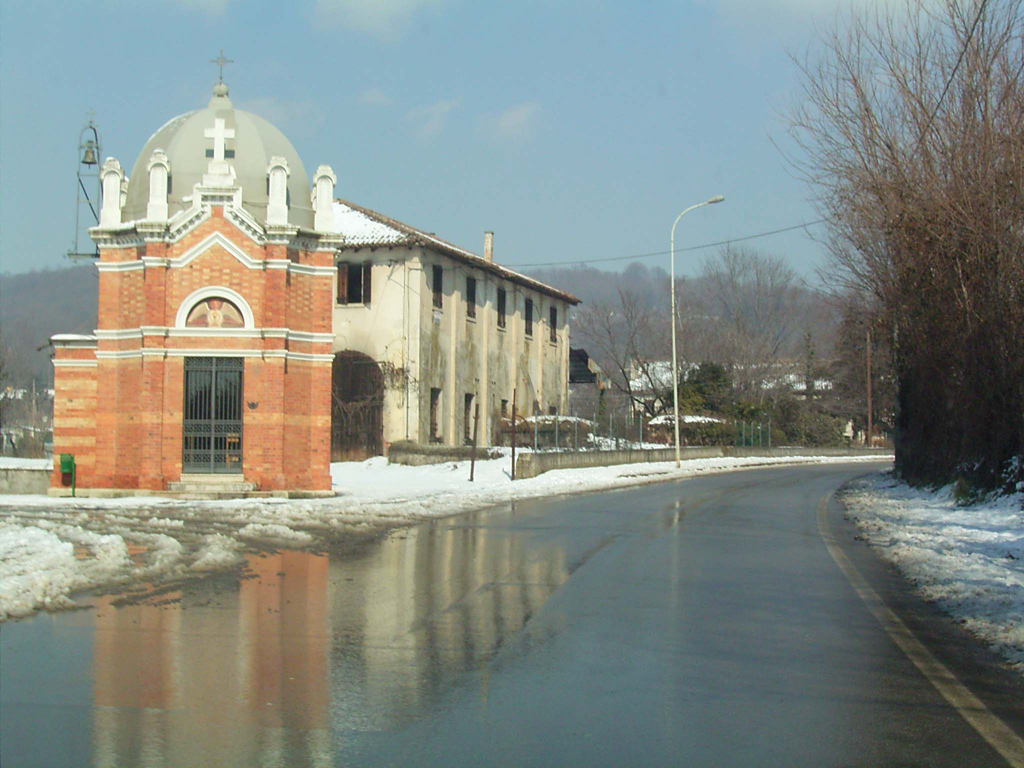

- Coat of arms

- Location within Italy Location within Veneto
- Coordinates: 45°47′N 12°7′E
- Country: Italy
- Region: Veneto
- Province: Treviso (TV)
- Frazioni: Santa Maria della Vittoria, Selva del Montello, Venegazzù

Government
  - Mayor: Roberto Toffoletto

Area
  - Total: 44.7 km^{2} (17.3 sq mi)
- Elevation: 91 m (299 ft)

Population (31 December 2021)
  - Total: 10,062
  - Density: 225/km^{2} (583/sq mi)
- Demonym: Volpaghesi
- Time zone: UTC+1 (CET)
  - Summer (DST): UTC+2 (CEST)
- Postal code: 31040
- Dialing code: 0423
- Website: Official website

Volpago del Montello is a comune (municipality) in the Province of Treviso in the Italian region Veneto, located about 40 kilometres (25 mi) northwest of Venice and about 15 kilometres (9 mi) northwest of Treviso on the southern slopes of Montello.

== History ==
The fall of the Republic of Venice was followed by an upheaval of the rural, political and religious systems replaced by municipalities. Volpago then passed with the whole of Veneto to the Kingdom of Lombardy–Venetia and was later united with the Kingdom of Italy.

In 1870, the town was one of the first to be industrialized, thanks to the activity of the Gobbato family. A spinning mill and a silk plant were added to the family's villas, which employed hundreds of people from neighboring villages as well. However, this did not help curb widespread poverty, which resulted in massive emigration abroad, especially to South America.

Near the Piave front, Volpago found itself on the front lines during World War I, which raged especially along the northern slope of Montello.

During World War II, Volpago saw many of its citizens fall in war, and many were also captured in the Nazi-fascist roundups.

== 1930 tornado ==
On 24 July 1930 the town was struck by a violent F5 tornado. The tornado caused extreme damage in the town, killing 23 people.

== Demographic evolution ==
Historical population

Year	Pop.	±%
1861	?	—
1871	4,951	—
1881	5,584	+12.8%
1901	6,230	+11.6%
1911	7,288	+17.0%
1921	8,003	+9.8%

Year	Pop.	±%
1931	7,751	−3.1%
1936	7,749	−0.0%
1951	8,089	+4.4%
1961	7,625	−5.7%
1971	7,888	+3.4%
1981	8,375	+6.2%

Year	Pop.	±%
1991	8,548	+2.1%
2001	9,084	+6.3%
2011	10,045	+10.6%
2021	10,062	+0.2%

Source: Data from ISTAT

=== Foreign ethnicities and minorities ===
As of 31 December 2022, foreigners residents in the municipality were 566, i.e. 5.6% of the population. The largest groups are shown below:

1. Morocco 125
2. Romania 103
3. China 44
4. Ukraine 43
5. Albania 36
6. Kosovo 31
7. Moldova 24

== Economy ==
The socio-economic development of the Volpago area was strongly characterized until the 1960s by large waves of emigration that gave those who remained the opportunity to receive remittances from fellow citizens abroad, essential for investing in businesses and contributing to the economic miracle that swept Italy after the war. The first emigrations to Central Europe and North America were soon replaced by numerous private small business initiatives that took the country out of rural reality. The number of family-run workshops that produced widespread prosperity was significant between the 1960s and 1980s. The processing of the related industries of large textile industries, sports shoes and canning activities constituted a very general source of employment and income. The socio-economic crisis of the early 1990s has reduced this organization which is no longer consistent with the different structures of the new economy. Currently, apart from some entrepreneurial initiatives, the population has found other sources of income that allow a fairly good standard of living. Though Volpago might have been known for its industrial settlements years ago, its attractions are currently quite different.

== Twin towns ==
Volpago del Montello is twinned with:

- Bree, Belgium, since 1985
- Salomó, Spain, since 1994
