= List of railway stations in Venice =

This is a list of railway stations in Venice, Italy.

== Passenger stations ==
- Venezia Santa Lucia railway station
- Venezia Porto Marghera railway station
- Venezia Mestre railway station
- Venezia Mestre Ospedale railway station
- Venezia Carpenedo railway station
