= Traiano railway station =

Railway station in Naples, Italy

Traiano
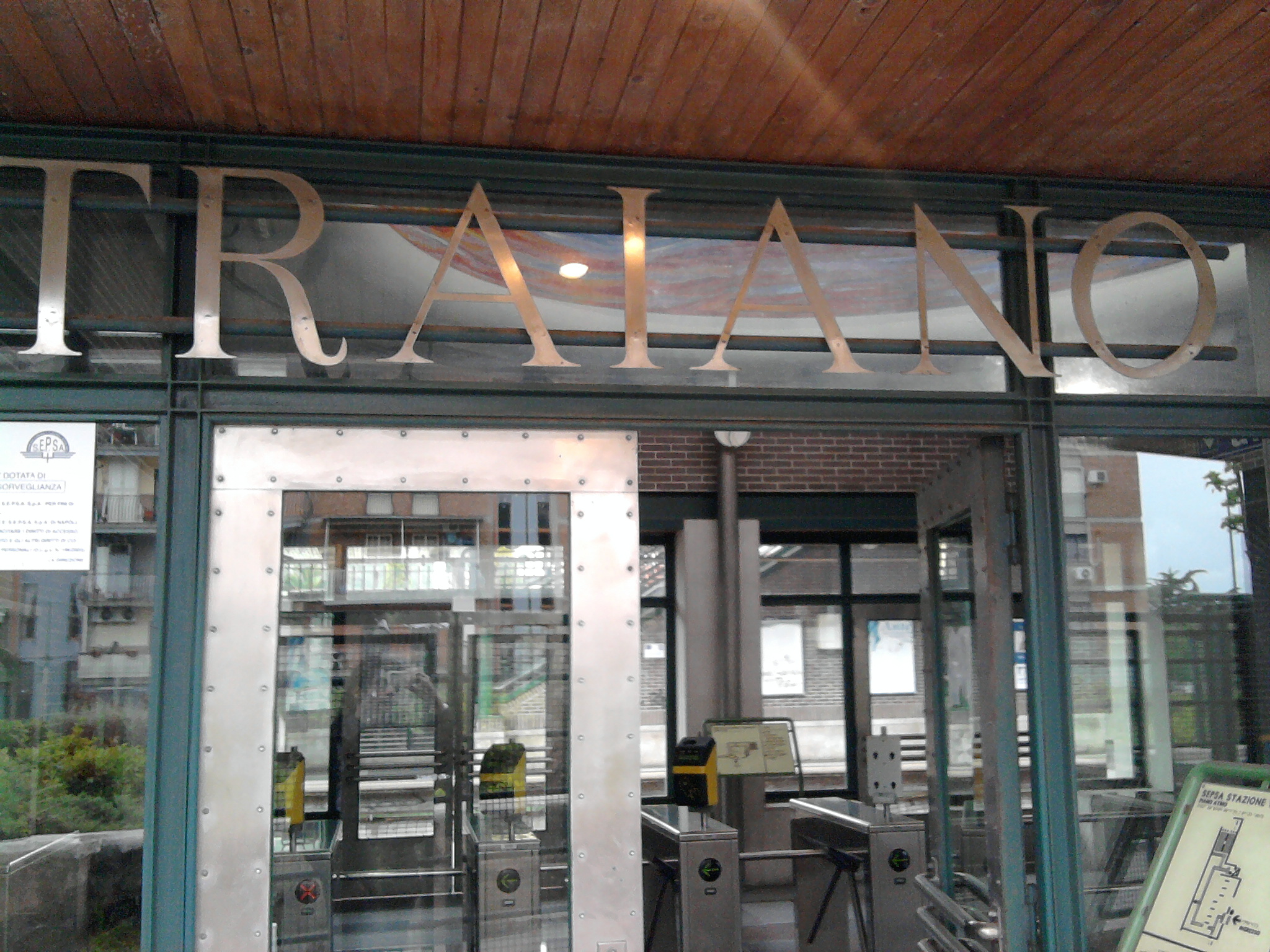

General information
- Location: Naples, Campania; Italy
- Coordinates: 40°50′42.28″N 14°11′38.62″E
- Line: Circumflegrea
- Tracks: 2
- Train operators: EAV
- Connections: ANM urban and intercity buses

History
- Opened: 15 December 1965; 60 years ago
Location
- Location within Campania Location within Italy

Traiano railway station (Italian: Stazione di Traiano) is a railway station in Naples, Italy. It is served by the Circumflegrea railway line, managed by EAV. It is located on Via de Civitate Dei and features a ramp connecting it to the underlying Via Saverio Simonetti in the Soccavo district. The station is named after Rione Traiano, the closest neighborhood.

== Station layout ==
The station, located at ground level, has two tracks, although only one is currently in use (the duplication of the line is under construction). It also features an elevator and an overpass that connects not only the two tracks but also the station’s exits—one on Via de Civitate Dei in the Soccavo district and the other on Via Simonetti in Rione Traiano. Additionally, the station is equipped with stairways and a ticket office.

It was renovated in 2005 by architect Nicola Pagliara, replacing the previous building with a new one.

== See also ==
- Rail transport in Italy
- List of railway stations in Naples
- List of railway stations in Campania
- Railway stations in Italy
