= Monte Sant'Angelo railway station =

Railway station in Naples, Italy

Monte Sant'Angelo
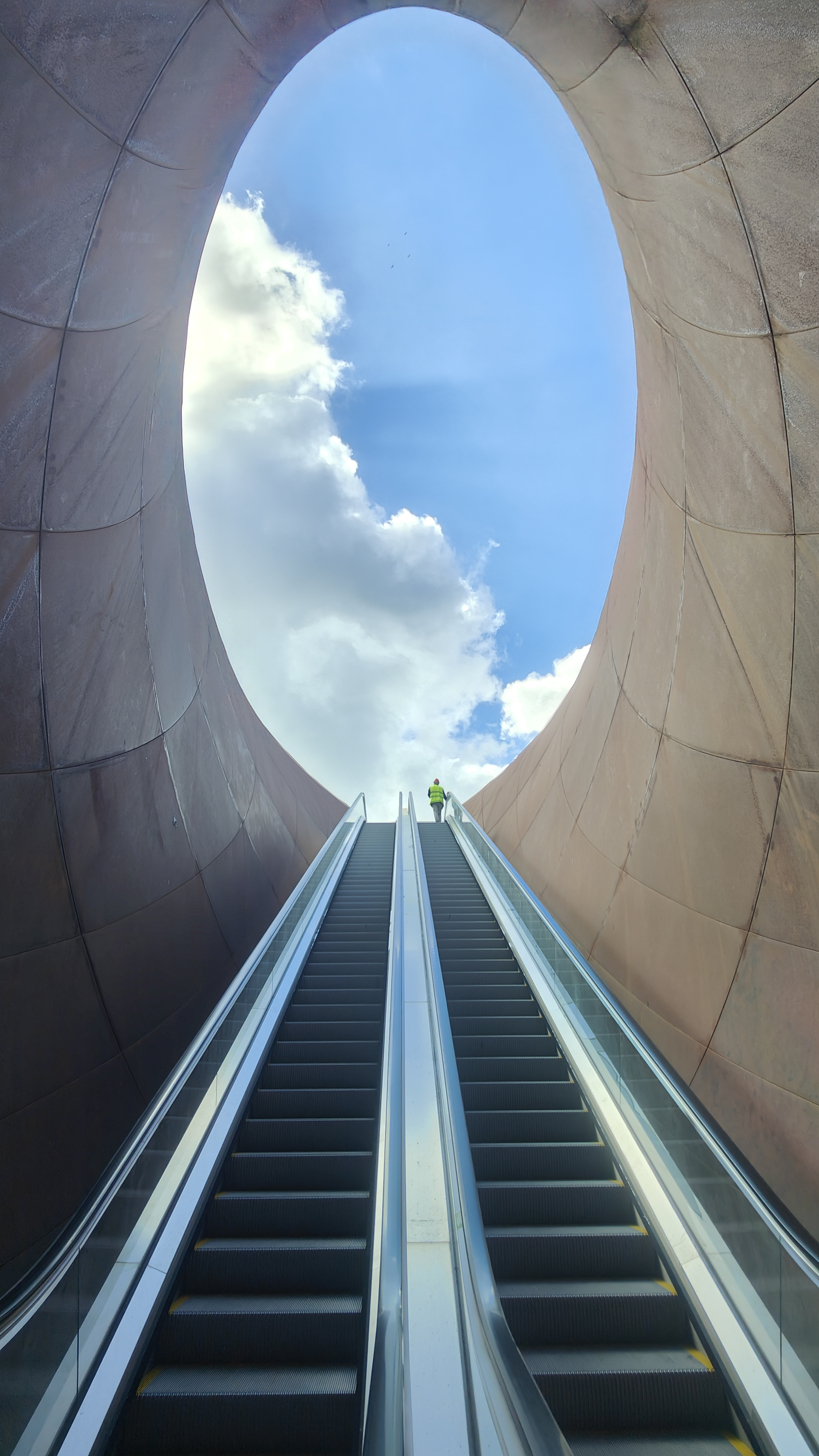

General information
- Location: Naples, Campania; Italy
- Coordinates: 40°50′31.8″N 14°11′07″E
- Line: Line 7
- Train operators: EAV

Construction
- Architect: Anish Kapoor

History
- Opened: 10 November 2025
Location
- Location within Campania Location within Italy

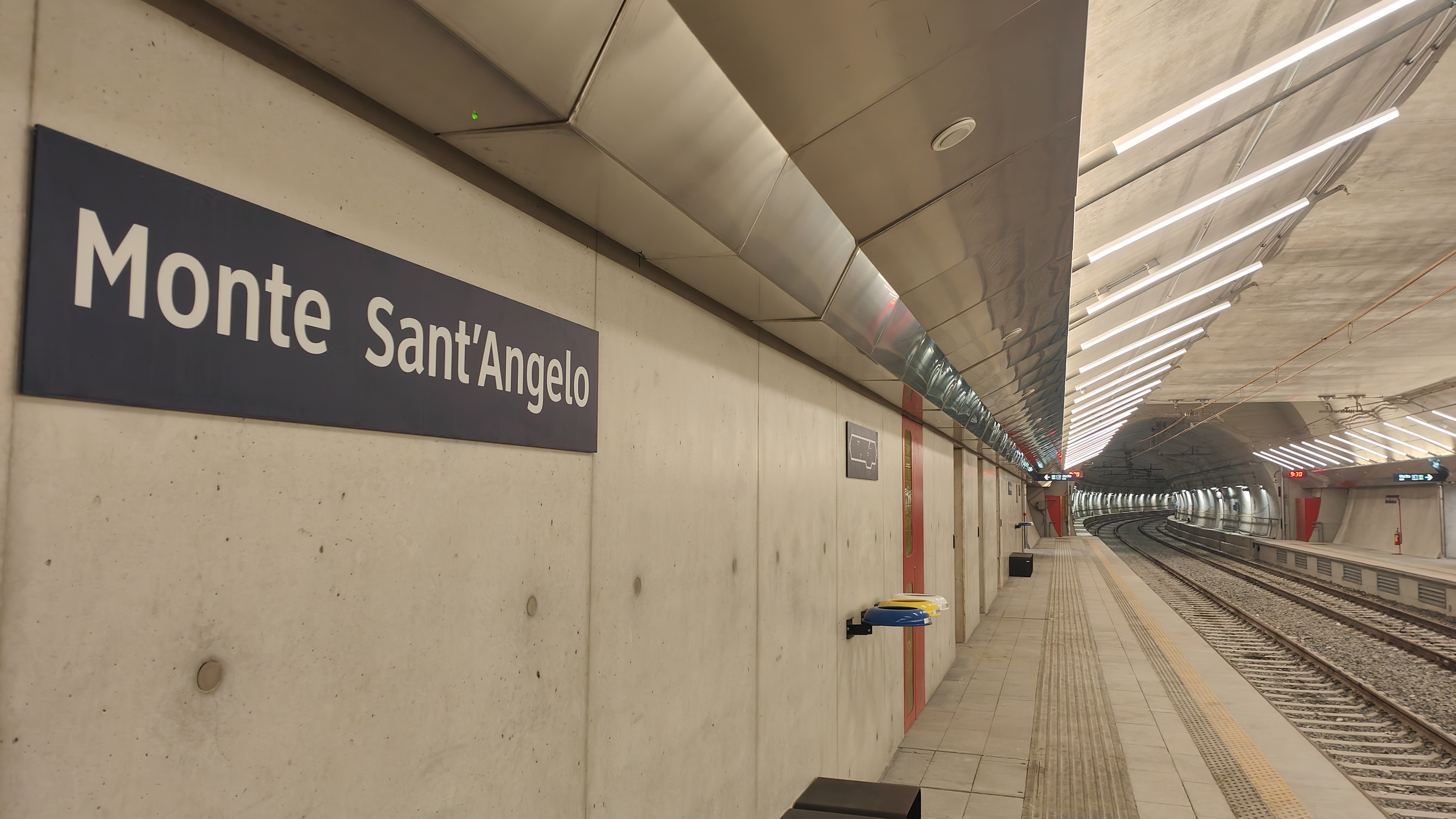
Monte Sant'Angelo platform

Monte Sant'Angelo railway station is a railway station in Naples located between the districts of Soccavo and Fuorigrotta. It is served by the Line 7 railway line, managed by EAV.

It takes its name from the Monte Sant'Angelo hill, where the University of Naples Federico II complex of the same name is located. The station was designed by Indian-born architect Anish Kapoor and serves both university students and the Rione Traiano neighborhood, where it has a dedicated exit. It will be accessible via a new railway link (under construction) connecting the Cumana and Circumflegrea railways, creating a fully urban railway line, Line 7.

== History ==
Construction of the station began in 2008, but progress has been slow due to the complexity of Kapoor's artistic massive structure, which was transported to Naples by sea from the Netherlands only in the summer of 2015.

== Station layout ==
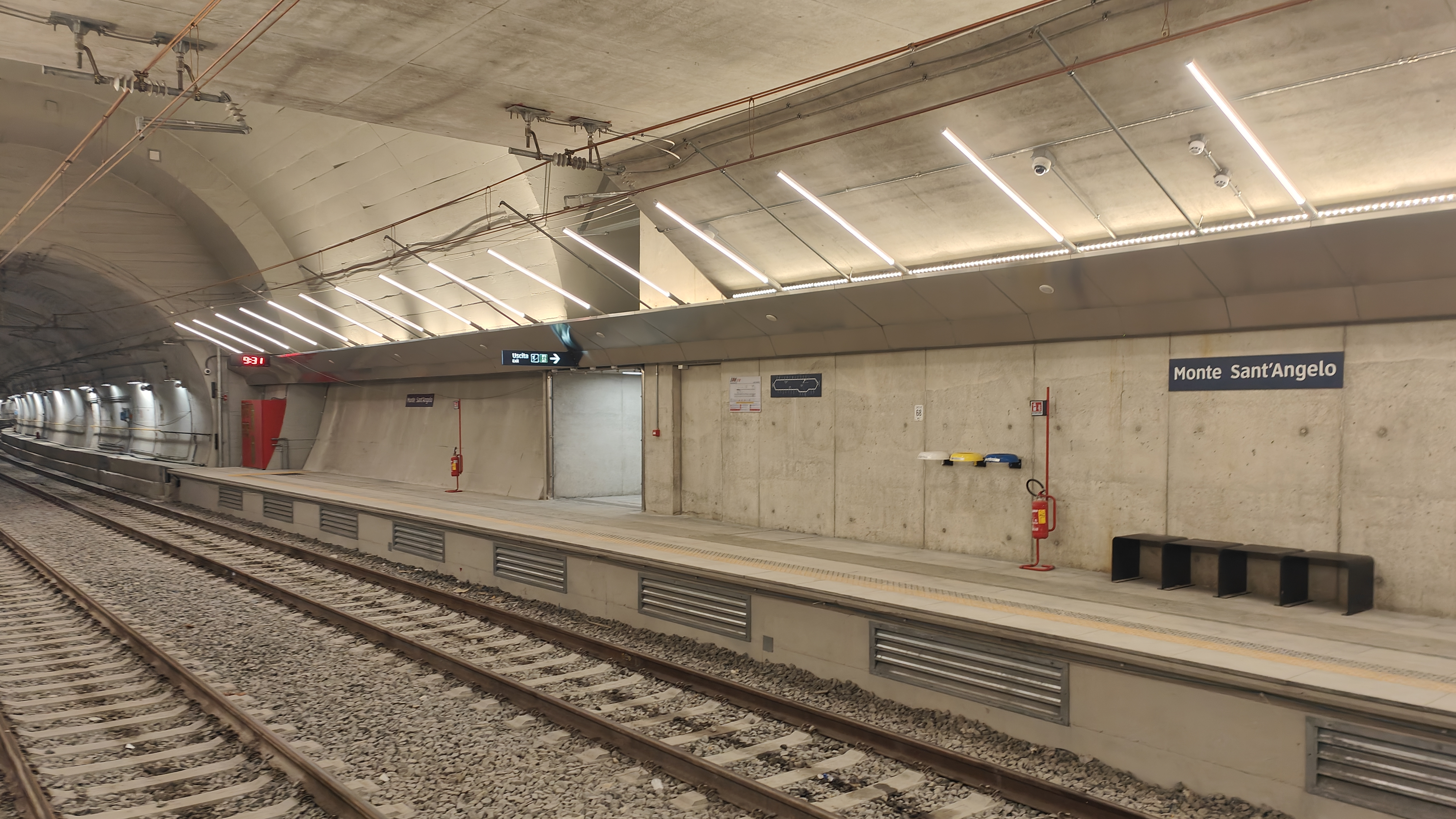
Platform

The station's design is highly ambitious: the exits are made of steel and have a sinuous, mouth-like shape, resembling fissures in the ground. Many have mischievously associated the structures with female genitalia, a comparison partially acknowledged by Amanda Levete, a collaborator on Kapoor's project.

== Connections ==
- Bus stop

== See also ==
ì*History of rail transport in Italy

- List of railway stations in Naples
- List of railway stations in Campania
- Railway stations in Italy
