= La Trencia railway station =

Railway station in Naples, Italy

La Trencia
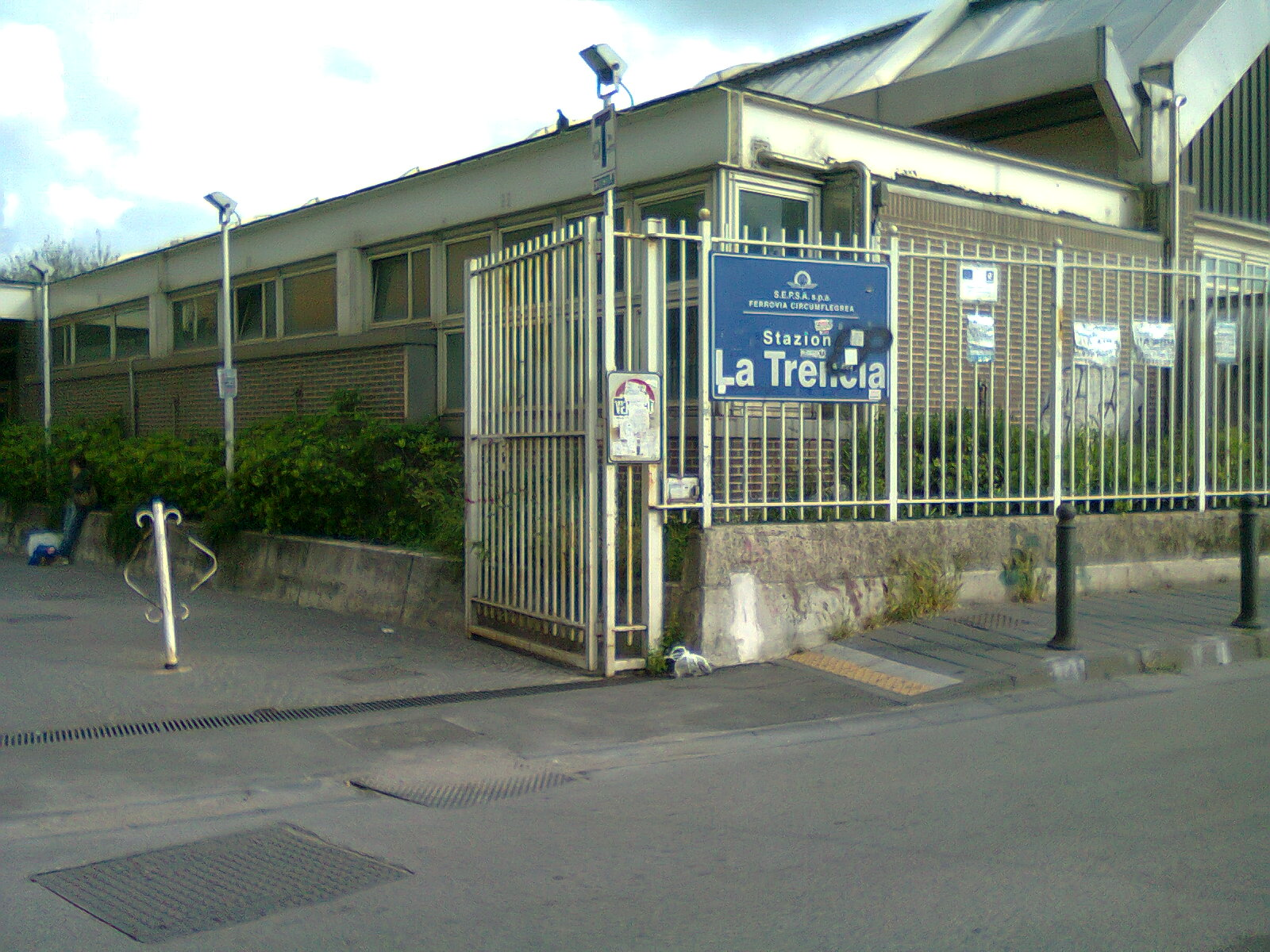

General information
- Location: Naples, Campania; Italy
- Coordinates: 40°51′14.76″N 14°10′18.12″E
- Line: Circumflegrea
- Tracks: 2
- Train operators: EAV
- Connections: ANM urban and intercity buses

History
- Opened: 30 June 1962; 64 years ago
Location
- Location within Campania Location within Italy

La Trencia railway station (Italian: Stazione di La Trencia) is a railway station in Naples, Italy. It is served by the Circumflegrea railway line, managed by EAV. It is located on Via Empedocle, in the Pianura quarter, and takes its name from the street Via Vicinale Trencia, which lies a short distance away.

== Station layout ==
The underground station currently operates with a single track. The second track, located on a different level, is situated behind a plasterboard wall between the entrance level and the current platform level. This wall is expected to be removed once double-track operations on the line are completed. The station is also equipped with a ticket office incorporating a newsstand, an elevator, and four escalators.

The station was renovated in 2005 by architect Nicola Pagliara, who replaced the previous station building with a new structure. As part of the project, the station, which had previously been located in an open railway cutting, was undergrounded by covering the cutting.

== See also ==
- History of rail transport in Italy
- List of railway stations in Naples
- Rail transport in Italy
- Railway stations in Italy
