= Piave railway station =

Railway station in Naples, Italy

Piave
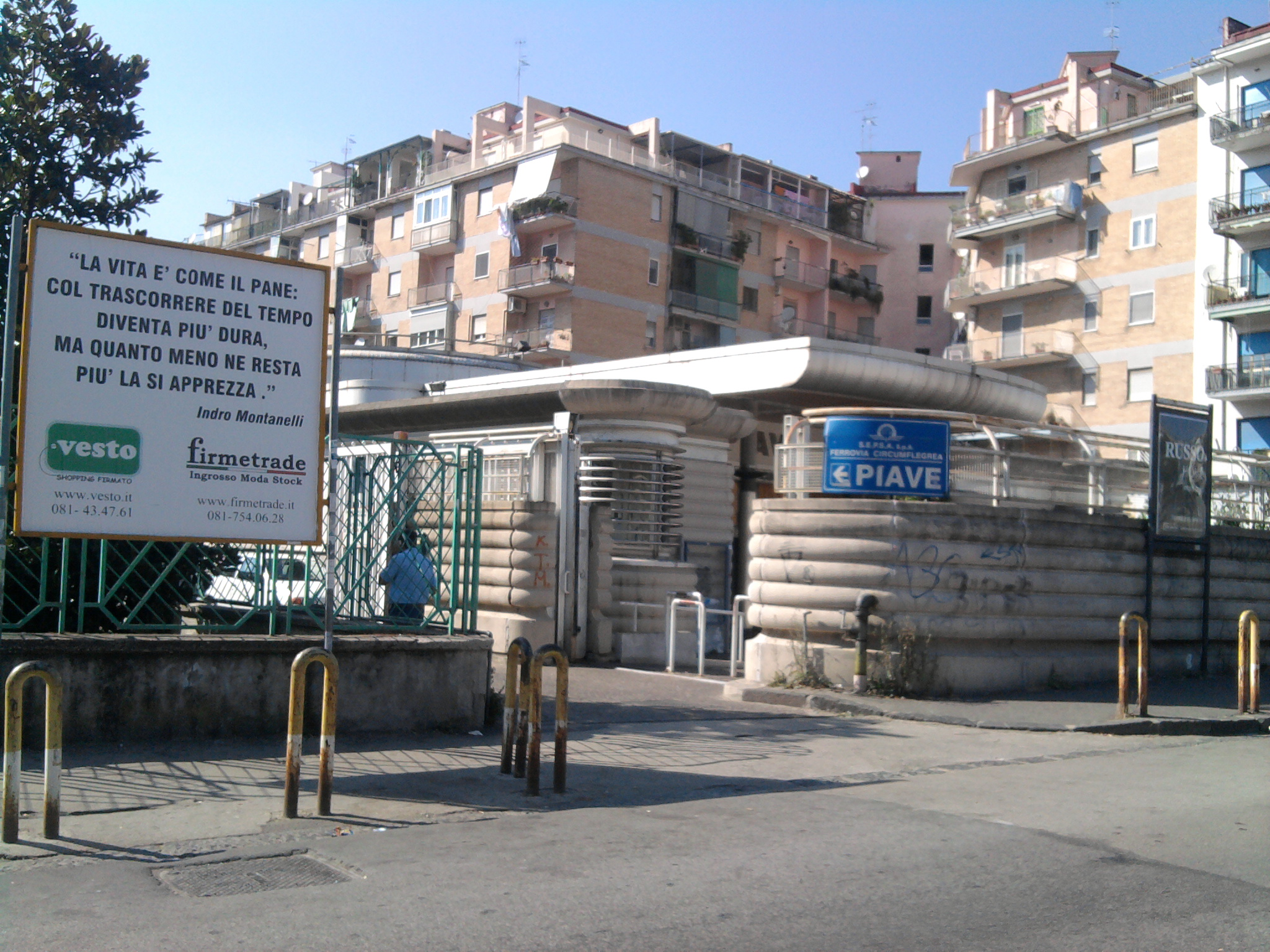
- The station

General information
- Location: Naples, Campania; Italy
- Coordinates: 40°50′34.44″N 14°12′23.4″E
- Line: Circumflegrea
- Tracks: 2
- Train operators: EAV
- Connections: ANM urban and intercity buses

History
- Opened: 30 June 1962; 64 years ago
Location
- Location within Campania Location within Italy

Piave railway station (Italian: Stazione di Piave) is a railway station in Naples, Italy. It is served by the Circumflegrea railway line, managed by EAV. It is located in the Piave area in the Soccavo quarter.

== Station layout ==
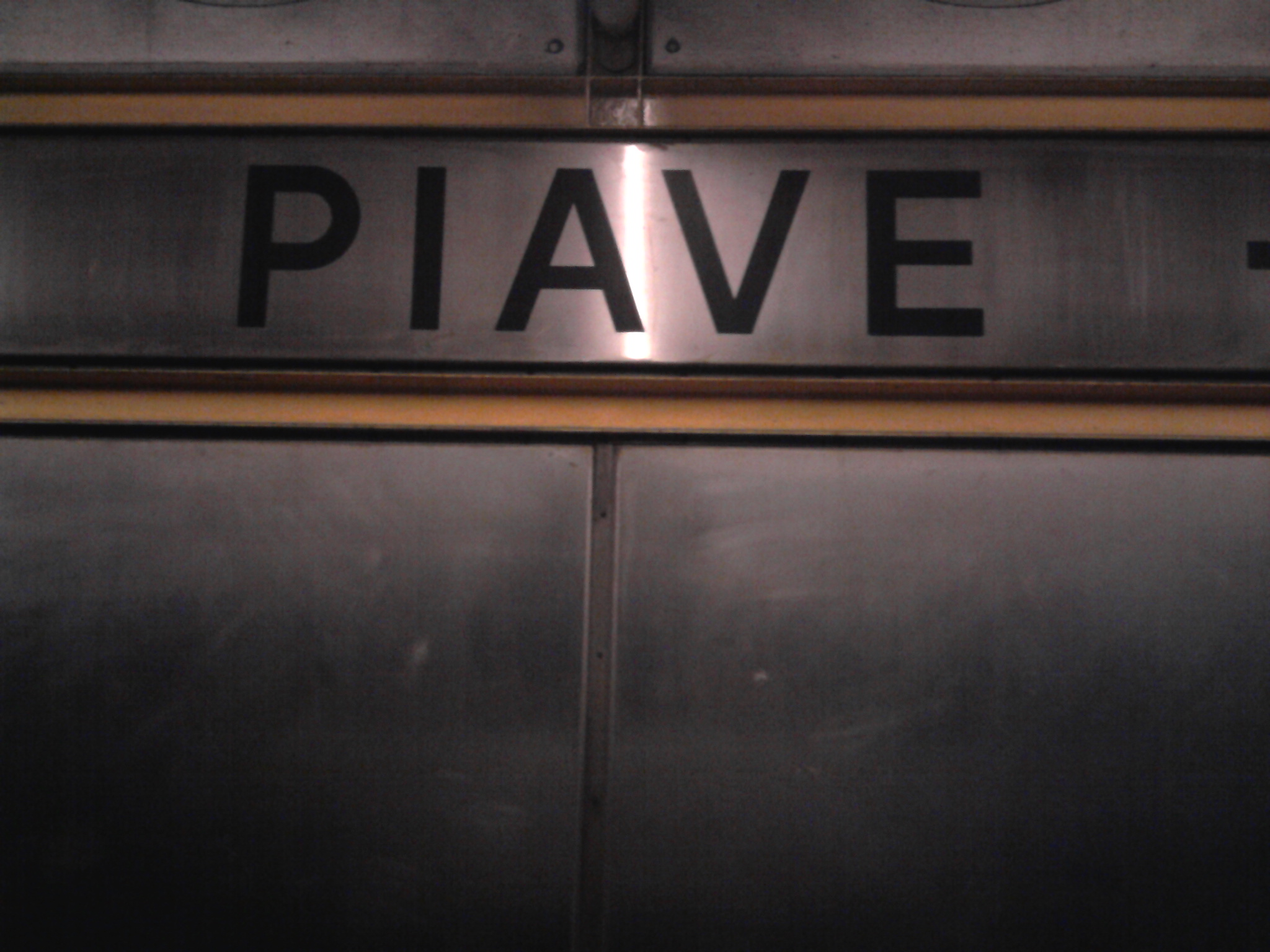
Interior of the station

The station was renovated in 1991 by Nicola Pagliara. The station is currently affected by infrastructure works aimed at doubling the Circumflegrea line along the entire section between Pisani and Quarto.

The station features a surface-level station building that provides access to the lower level, where the railway facilities are located. The station itself is situated in an underground tunnel, although immediately beyond the station the line emerges onto an elevated section.

There are two tracks, but currently only one is used for traffic in both directions, as work on the construction of the second track is still ongoing elsewhere along the line. Access to the platforms is provided not only by stairs but also by escalators and elevators. A ticket office is also available.

== See also ==
- History of rail transport in Italy
- List of railway stations in Campania
- Rail transport in Italy
- Railway stations in Italy
