= Line 7 (Naples) =

Commuter urban railway in Naples, Italy

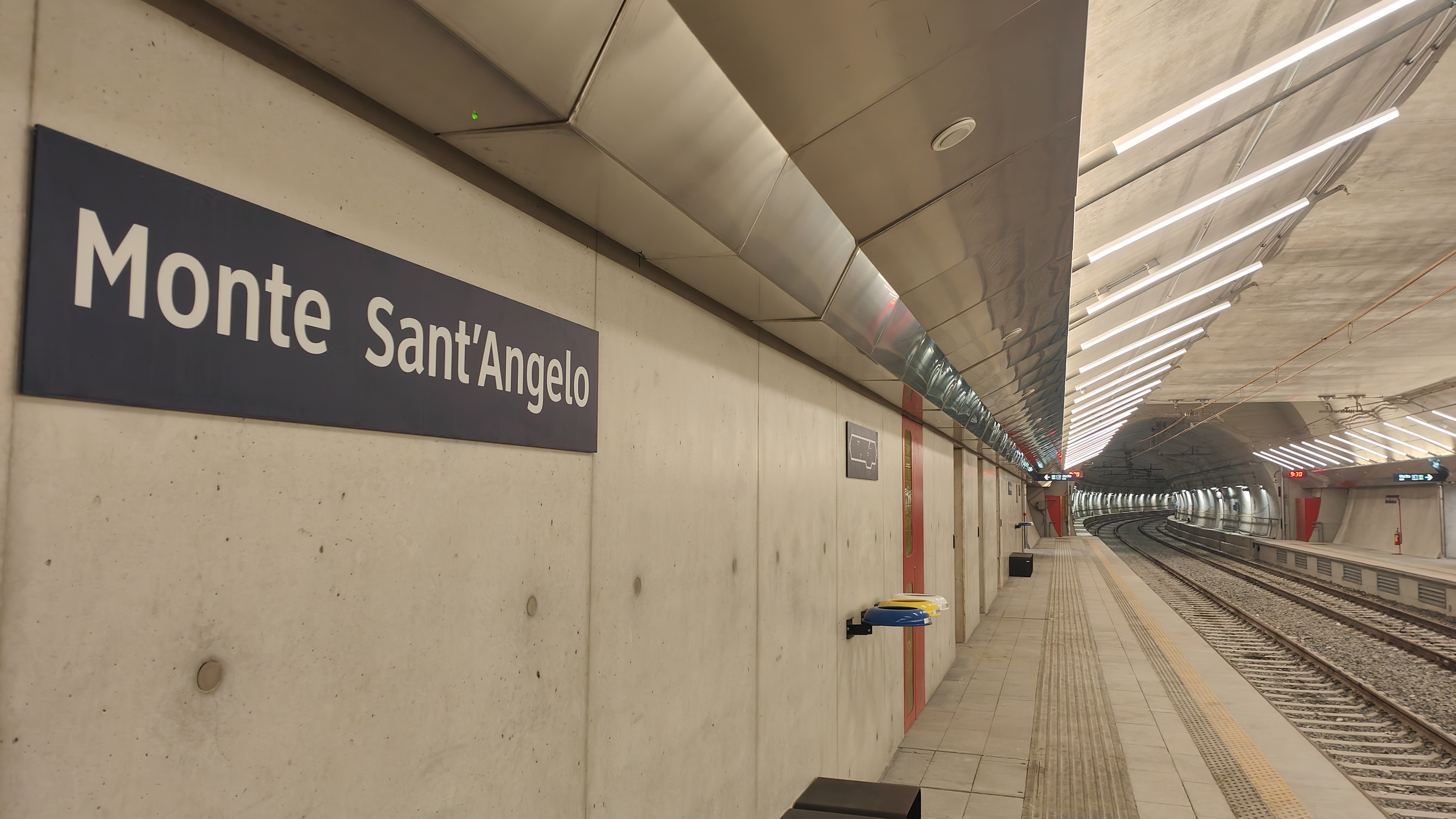
- Monte Sant'Angelo platform.

Overview
- Status: Operational
- Owner: Campania Regional Government
- Locale: Naples, Campania, Italy
- Termini: Soccavo; Monte Sant'Angelo
- Connecting lines: Cumana
- Stations: 1 (+4 planned)

Service
- Type: Commuter rail
- System: Naples metropolitan railway service
- Operator(s): EAV

History
- Opened: 10 November 2025

Technical
- Track gauge: 1,435 mm (4 ft 8 1/2 in) standard gauge
- Electrification: 1,500 V DC overhead catenary
Route map

Line 7 (Italian: Linea 7), also known as Intraflegrea, is a commuter rail line, part of the Naples metropolitan railway service in Naples, Italy. It connects the Circumflegrea railway to the Cumana railway through an entirely underground route starting from Soccavo station. Locals also refers to it as the Monte Sant'Angelo link (bretella di Monte Sant'Angelo), as it is be the first rail connection serving the Monte Sant'Angelo university complex.

The first section from Soccavo to Monte Sant'Angelo was inaugurated on 10 November 2025. The second section, from Monte Sant'Angelo to Parco San Paolo, is currently under construction, while the next station, Terracina, is awaiting the start of works. The final section is still in the preliminary design phase, as various project scenarios have been developed regarding its connection to the Cumana railway.

== History ==
Construction of the line began in 2008 but was halted in 2011 due to a financial dispute between the Campania regional government and the construction companies. Work resumed in 2016 following new funding.

On June 29, 2021, the contract for the project revision of Parco San Paolo station was signed.

In EAV's investment review plan of November 2021, a route modification was proposed, which includes an extension and subsequent connection to the Cumana railway at Bagnoli station, with the undergrounding of the existing section from Bagnoli to Mostra-Stadio Maradona. This update also includes a new stop serving the Gioacchino Rossini hospitality institute on Via Terracina, as well as the relocation of Giochi del Mediterraneo station further west, with a possible interchange with Line 2.

== Route ==
Line 7

Station	Opened	Transfers and notes
Soccavo	1962	Circumflegrea railway
Monte Sant'Angelo	2025	
Parco San Paolo	TBD	

== See also ==
- Naples metropolitan railway service
- Rail transport in Italy
