= Quarto Centro railway station =

Railway station in Quarto, Campania, Italy

Quarto Centro
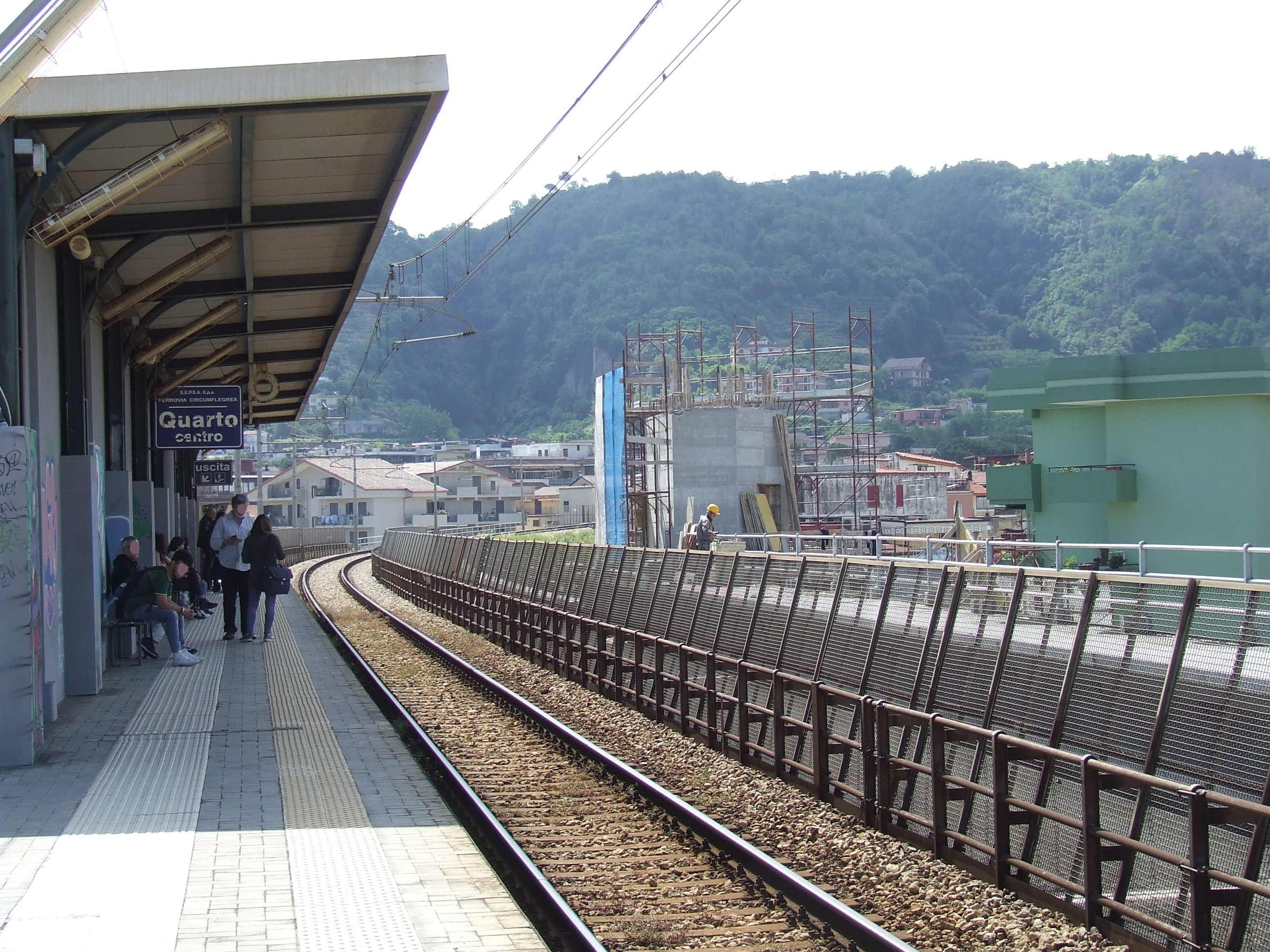
- The station platforms during the double-tracking works

General information
- Location: Quarto, Metropolitan City of Naples, Campania; Italy
- Coordinates: 40°52′48.36″N 14°08′43.08″E
- Line: Circumflegrea
- Tracks: 2
- Train operators: EAV
- Connections: Urban and intercity buses

History
- Opened: 30 June 1962; 64 years ago
Location
- Location within Campania Location within Italy

Quarto Centro railway station (Italian: Stazione di Quarto Centro) is a railway station in Quarto, Italy. It is served by the Circumflegrea railway line, managed by EAV. It is located on Via Giorgio de Falco in the municipality of Quarto, and is the first station on the line situated outside the city of Naples.

== Station layout ==
The station is built on a viaduct and consists of a single track located on the upper level. The lower level contains the ticket office, stairways, and an elevator providing access to the platform above.

The station is currently affected by infrastructure works aimed at doubling the Circumflegrea line along the entire section between Pisani and Quarto.

Passenger traffic remains significant throughout the day due to the high population density of the surrounding area. The station also benefits from its proximity to the EAV bus depot in Quarto, from which bus services operate to nearby quarters and municipalities.

== See also ==
- History of rail transport in Italy
- List of railway stations in Campania
- Rail transport in Italy
- Railway stations in Italy
