= Pianura railway station =

Railway station in Naples, Italy

Pianura
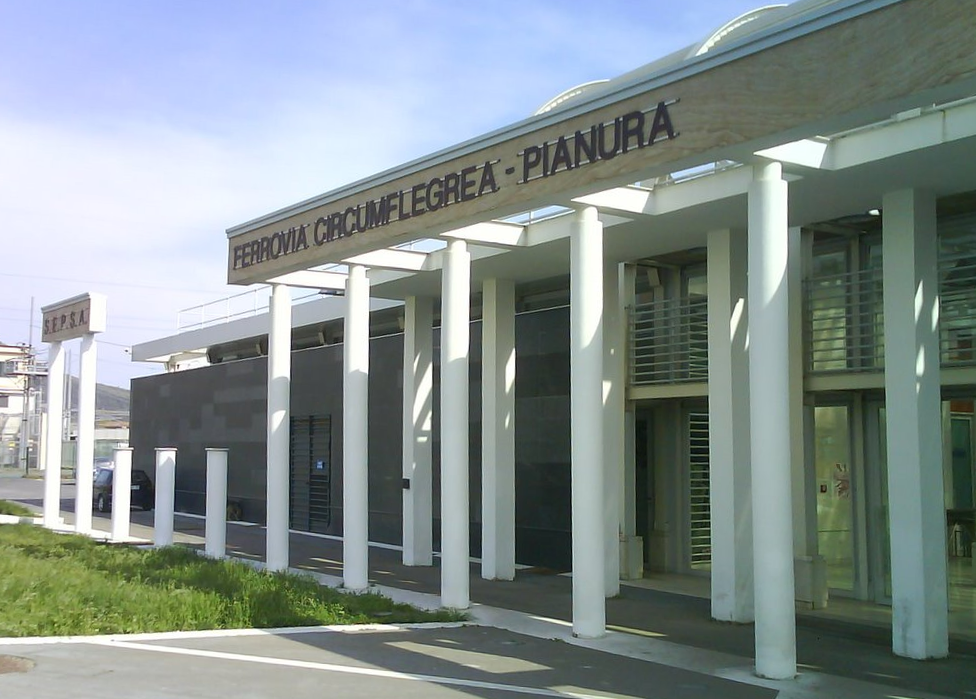
- The station in 2006

General information
- Location: Naples, Campania; Italy
- Coordinates: 40°51′21.96″N 14°09′44.64″E
- Line: Circumflegrea
- Tracks: 2
- Train operators: EAV
- Connections: ANM urban and intercity buses

History
- Opened: 30 June 1962; 64 years ago
Location
- Location within Campania Location within Italy

Pianura railway station (Italian: Stazione di Pianura) is a railway station in Naples, Italy. It is served by the Circumflegrea railway line, managed by EAV. The station is located on Via Picasso, in the Pianura district.

== Station layout ==
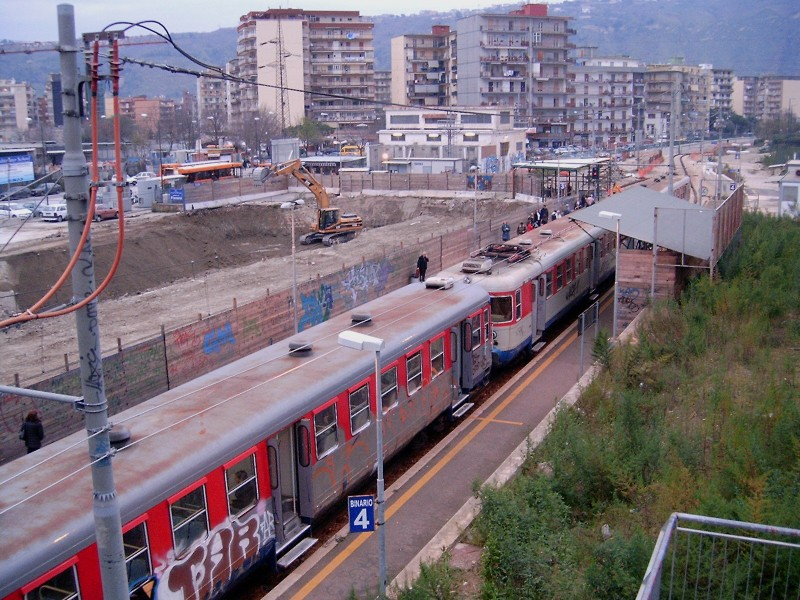
The station during the 2006 renovation works.

The station was renovated in 2006 and has two tracks. It is equipped with a subway underpass leading to platform 2, two elevators, a ticket office, a newsstand, and a bar.

An overpass above the tracks connects Via Picasso to Via del Polo Artigianale, on the opposite side of the station.

The station serves as an important interchange hub for ANM bus lines. Passenger traffic is consistently high throughout the day, reflecting the dense residential character of the surrounding area.

== See also ==
- History of rail transport in Italy
- List of railway stations in Naples
- List of railway stations in Campania
- Railway stations in Italy
