= Soccavo railway station =

Railway station in Naples, Italy

Soccavo
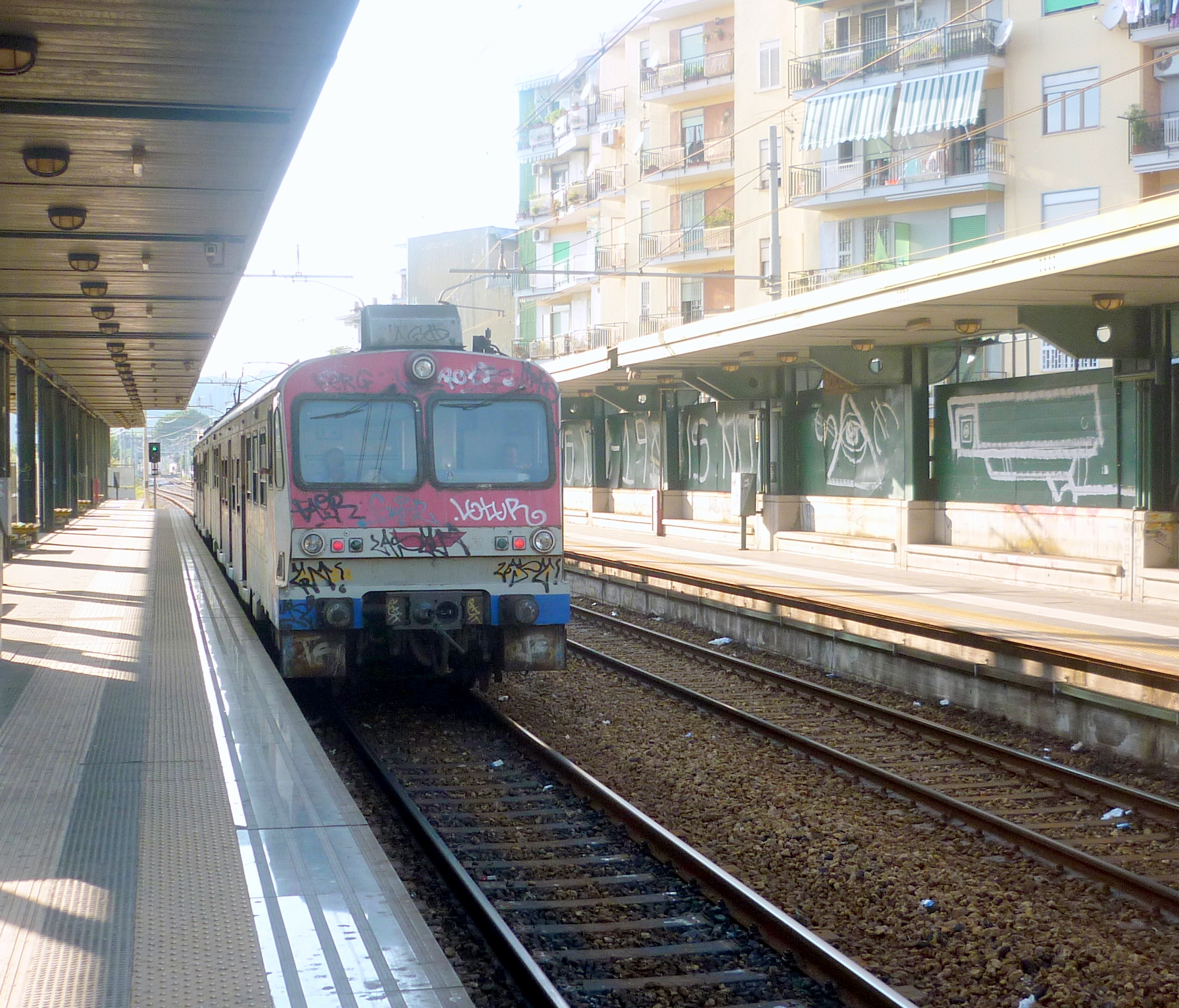

General information
- Location: Naples, Campania; Italy
- Coordinates: 40°50′38.4″N 14°12′02.88″E
- Line: Circumflegrea
- Train operators: EAV
- Connections: ANM urban and intercity buses

History
- Opened: 30 June 1962; 64 years ago
Location
- Location within Campania Location within Italy

Soccavo railway station (Italian: Stazione di Soccavo) is a railway station in Naples, Italy. It is served by the Circumflegrea railway line, managed by EAV. The station was renovated in 1990 by architect Nicola Pagliara, replacing the previous building with a new one featuring a brick curtain façade, aluminum panels, and glass blocks.

The section of the station intended for the future Line 7 of Naples metropolitan railway service is currently under construction; this line will connect Soccavo station to Edenlandia on the Cumana railway.

== See also ==
- History of rail transport in Italy
- List of railway stations in Naples
- List of railway stations in Campania
- Railway stations in Italy
