= Venezia Porto Marghera railway station =

Railway station in Venice, Italy

Venezia Porto Marghera
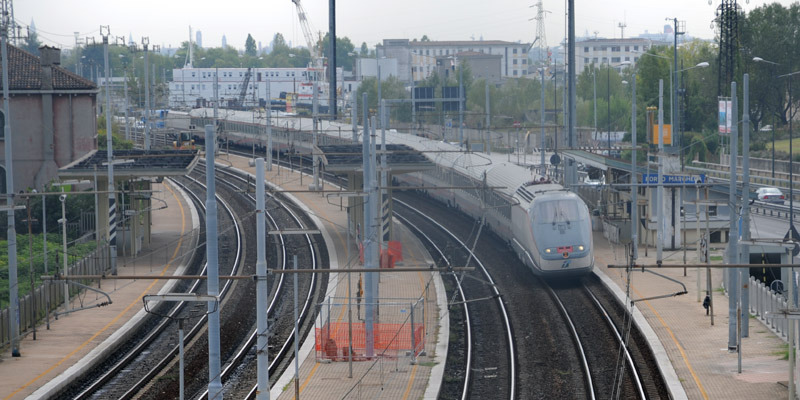
- View of the station in the direction of Venice Saint Lucia

General information
- Location: Italy
- Coordinates: 45°28′21″N 12°15′22″E
- Lines: Venice – Milan; Venezia-Udine; Trento – Venice; Venice – Trieste

Other information
- Status: in use

Services
Preceding station	Trenitalia	Following station
Venezia Mestre towards Verona Porta Nuova or Brescia	Regionale; Verona–Venice	Venezia Santa Lucia Terminus
Venezia Mestre towards Portogruaro-Caorle	Regionale; Venice–Portogruaro	Venezia Santa Lucia Terminus
Venezia Mestre towards Trieste Centrale	Regionale; Venice–Trieste via Udine	Venezia Santa Lucia Terminus
Venezia Mestre towards Bassano del Grappa	Regionale; Bassano del Grappa–Venice	Venezia Santa Lucia Terminus
Location
- Location within Veneto Location within Northern Italy Location within Italy

Venezia Porto Marghera railway station is a stop located in the trunk railway between Venezia Mestre and Venezia Santa Lucia just before the bridge across the lagoon. It is located at 260.191 kilometer of the Milan-Venice railway and operated by Rete Ferroviaria Italiana. The train services are operated by Trenitalia and Sistemi Territoriali. The technology park "Vega" is in its immediate vicinity.

== History ==
The first station was opened in Venice Marghera at December 13, 1842 in the aftermath of the inauguration of Marghera – Padua, the first section of the strada ferrata Ferdinandea.

The location of the port was temporary, so that in January 1844, when the bridge over the lagoon had not still been completed it was moved to San Giuliano.

== Features ==
There are four tracks and four platforms, where the users can access by an underpass.

The stop is served by some regional trains of different lines that are routed on the trunk rail Venezia Mestre – Venezia Santa Lucia (the Milan–Venice railway, the Trento–Venice railway, the Venezia-Udine railway and the Venice–Trieste railway ), which increase considerably in conjunction working hours on weekdays.

The stop has four pedestrian entrances:

- via Paganello side Mestre (near via Torino and via Ca 'Marcello);
- via Della Libertà, roadway Venice;
- via Della Libertà, roadway Mestre;
- the fourth access, by way of Liberty, roadway Mestre, actually located in Via Torino, being a pedestrian path delimited with double guardrails continue until the subway station.

=== Developments ===
The stop is part of the program of the Regional Metropolitan Railway System, so plans for the restructuring of the structures with the adjustment to the standard of this system: bus shelters, raised curbs and accessibility for the handicapped.

== Train services ==
The station is served by the following services:

- Regional services (Treno regionale) Verona – Vicenza – Padua – Venice
- Regional services (Treno regionale) Bassano del Grappa – Castelfranco Veneto – Venice
- Local services (Treno regionale) Portogruaro – Venice
- Local services (Treno regionale) Adria – Piove di Sacco – Venice

== Services ==
The station has:

- Bus stops (via della Libertà, both carriageways)
- Underpass

== Gallery ==
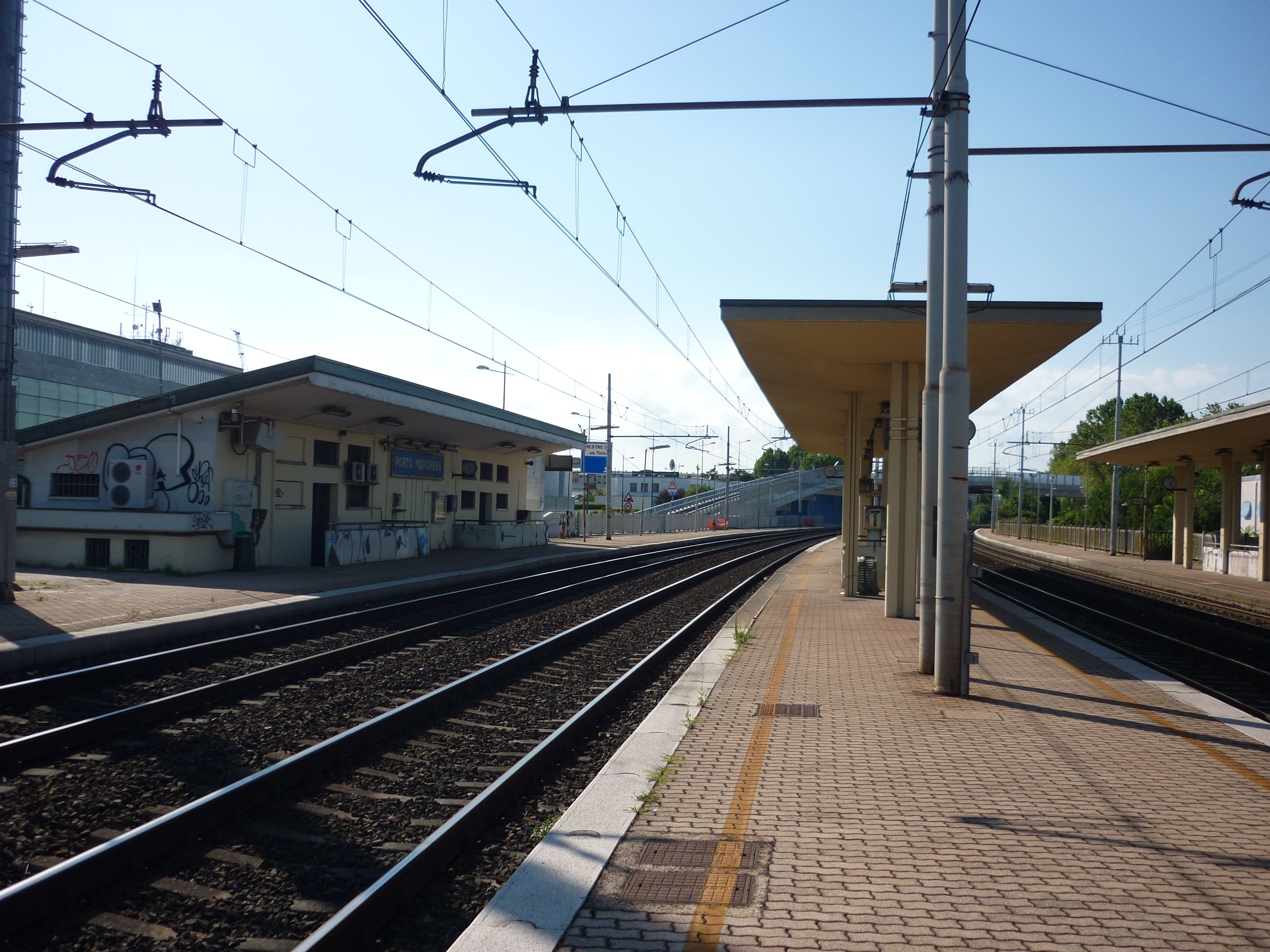
View of the station in the direction of Mestre

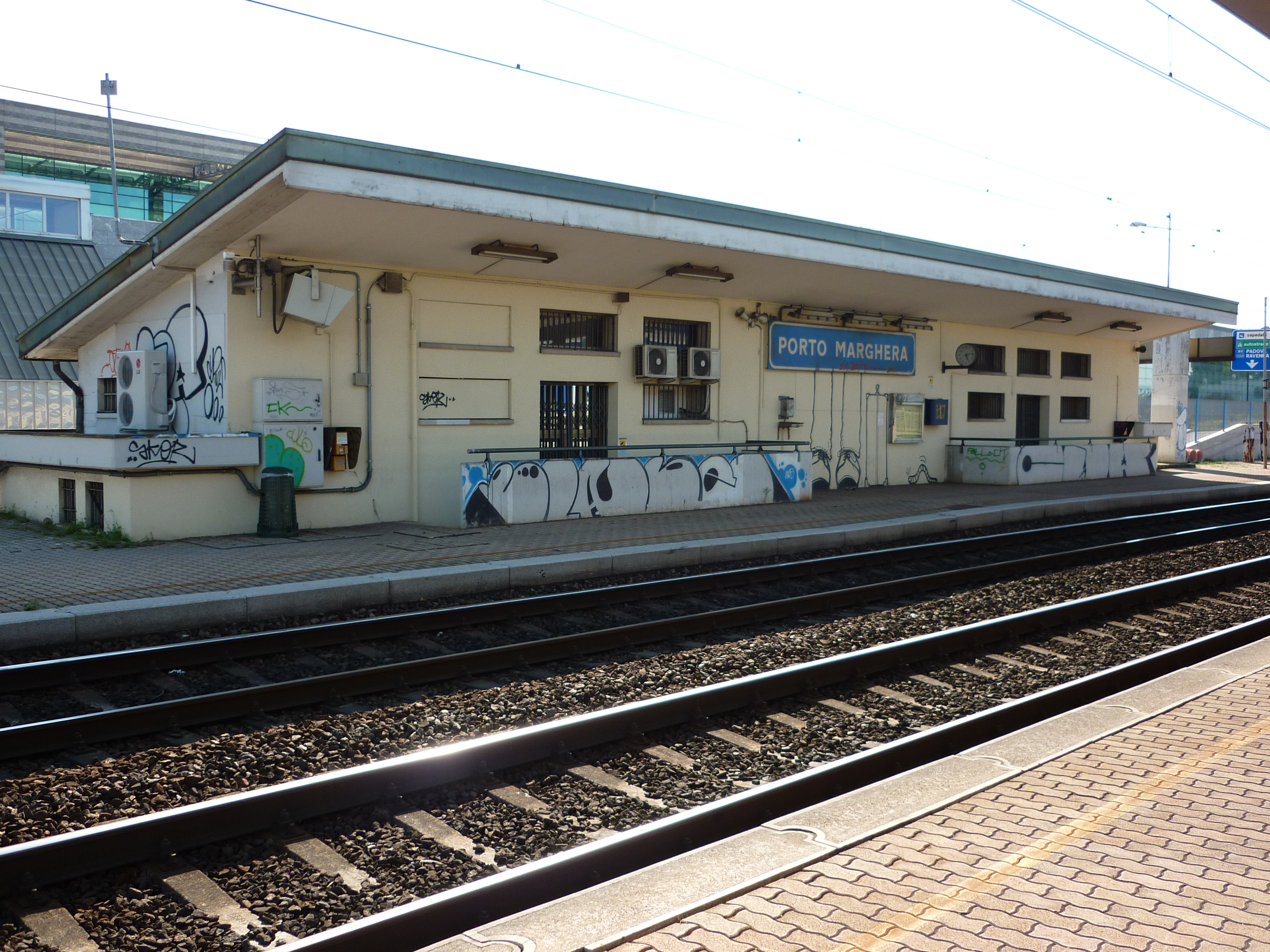
View of the building
