= Venezia Santa Lucia railway station =

Railway station in Venice, Italy

Venezia Santa Lucia
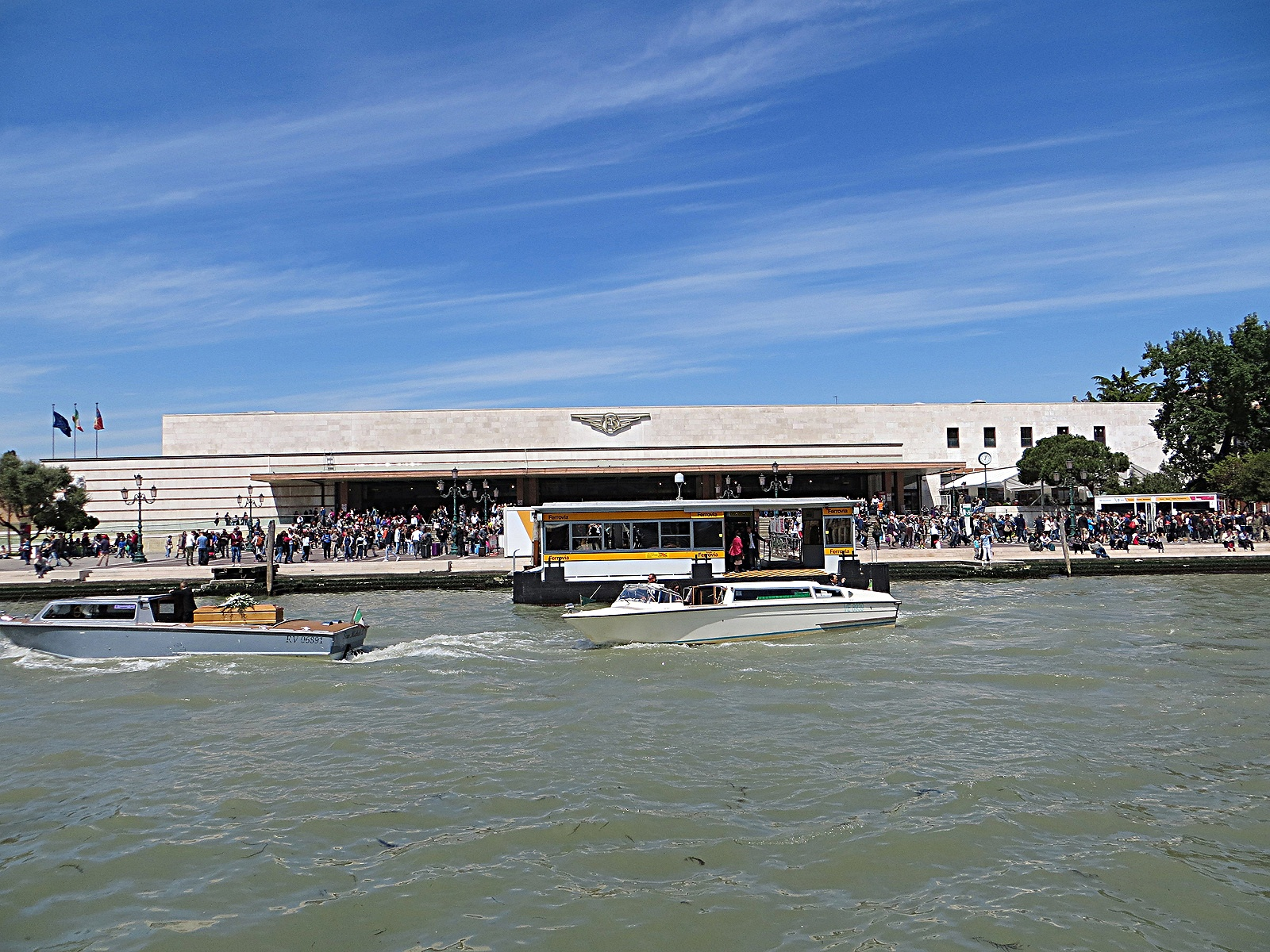
- The station's facade exemplifies rationalist and Fascist architecture

General information
- Location: Fondamenta Santa Lucia, 30121, Venice, Veneto; Italy
- Coordinates: 45°26′27″N 12°19′15″E
- Owner: Rete Ferroviaria Italiana
- Operator: Grandi Stazioni (Station); Trenitalia (Train services)
- Lines: Milan–Venice railway Venice–Trieste railway Venice–Udine railway Trento–Venice railway
- Platforms: 23

Other information
- IATA code: XVQ
- Classification: Platinum

History
- Opened: 1861; 165 years ago
Services
Preceding station	Trenitalia	Following station
Venezia Mestre towards Milano Centrale	Frecciarossa	Terminus
Venezia Mestre towards Lecce	Frecciarossa	Terminus
Venezia Mestre towards Napoli Centrale or Reggio di Calabria Centrale	Frecciarossa	Terminus
Venezia Mestre towards Roma Termini	InterCity Notte; Trieste–Rome	Treviso Centrale towards Trieste Centrale
Venezia Mestre towards Genève-Cornavin	EuroCity	Terminus
Venezia Mestre towards Zürich HB	EuroCity	Terminus
Venezia Mestre towards Wien Hbf	Railjet	Terminus
Venezia Mestre towards Verona Porta Nuova	Regionale Veloce; Verona–Venice	Terminus
Venezia Mestre towards Trieste Centrale	Regionale Veloce; Venice–Trieste via Cervignano del Friuli	Terminus
Venezia Mestre towards Trieste Centrale	Regionale Veloce; Venice–Trieste via Udine	Terminus
Venezia Porto Marghera towards Verona Porta Nuova or Brescia	Regionale; Verona–Venice	Terminus
Venezia Porto Marghera towards Portogruaro-Caorle	Regionale; Venice–Portogruaro	Terminus
Venezia Porto Marghera towards Trieste Centrale	Regionale; Venice–Trieste via Udine	Terminus
Venezia Porto Marghera towards Bassano del Grappa	Regionale; Bassano del Grappa–Venice	Terminus
Preceding station		Following station
Venezia Mestre towards Napoli Centrale	Venezia–Napoli	Terminus
Location
- Click on the map for a fullscreen view

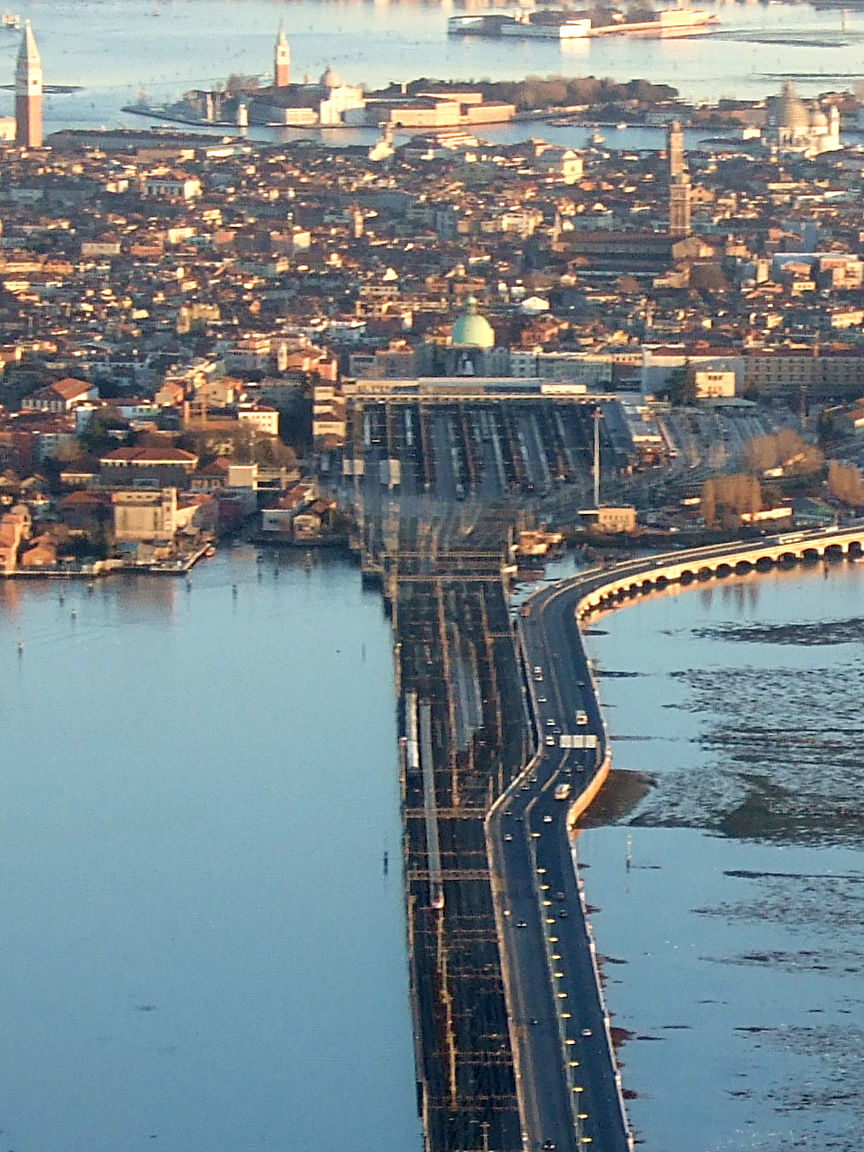
View from the northwest

Venezia Santa Lucia (Italian: Stazione di Venezia Santa Lucia) (IATA: XVQ) is the central station of Venice in the north-east of Italy. It is a terminus and located at the northern edge of Venice's historic city (Italian: Centro storico). The station is one of Venice's two most important railway stations; the other one is Venezia Mestre, a mainline junction station on Venice's mainland district of Mestre. Both Santa-Lucia and Mestre stations are managed by Grandi Stazioni and they are connected to each other by Ponte della Libertà (English: Liberty Bridge).

== Location ==
Venezia Santa Lucia is located in Cannaregio district, the northernmost of the six historic sestieri (districts) of Venice's historic city. It is situated on the northernmost island and near the western end of the Grand Canal. The station lies at the 267 kilometres (166 mi) mark of the Milan–Venice railway.

A bridge over the Grand Canal, the Ponte degli Scalzi (or Ponte dei Scalzi) (English: Bridge of the Discalced), links the concourse in front of the station with the sestiere of Santa Croce.

Venice's historic city had access only by river boats or railway until 1933 (construction of the road bridge and of Piazzale Roma). Since then, a terminal has been built for road transport with car parks and bus stations.

== History ==
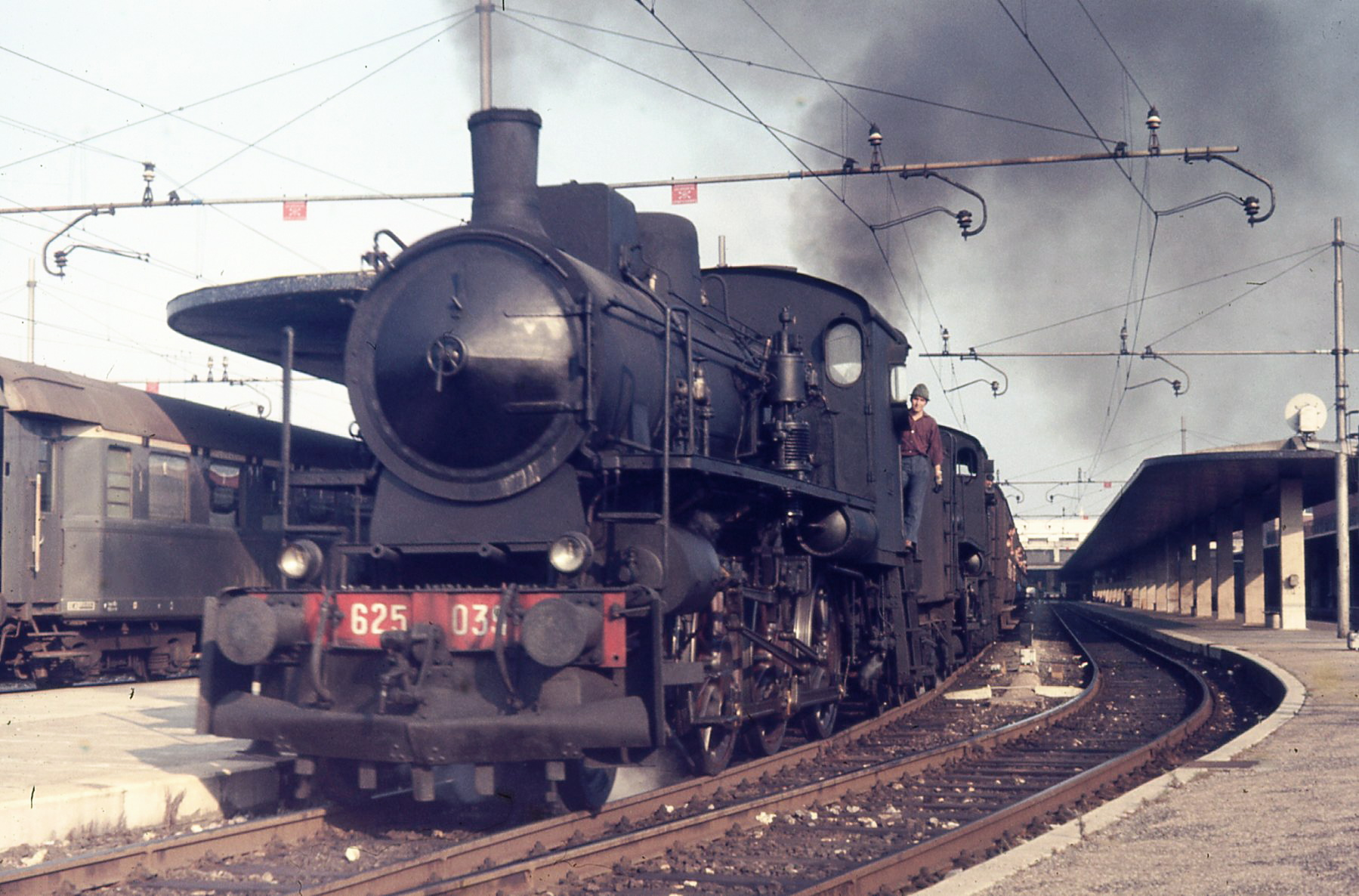
Steam train from Santa Lucia to Bassano del Grappa, August 1973

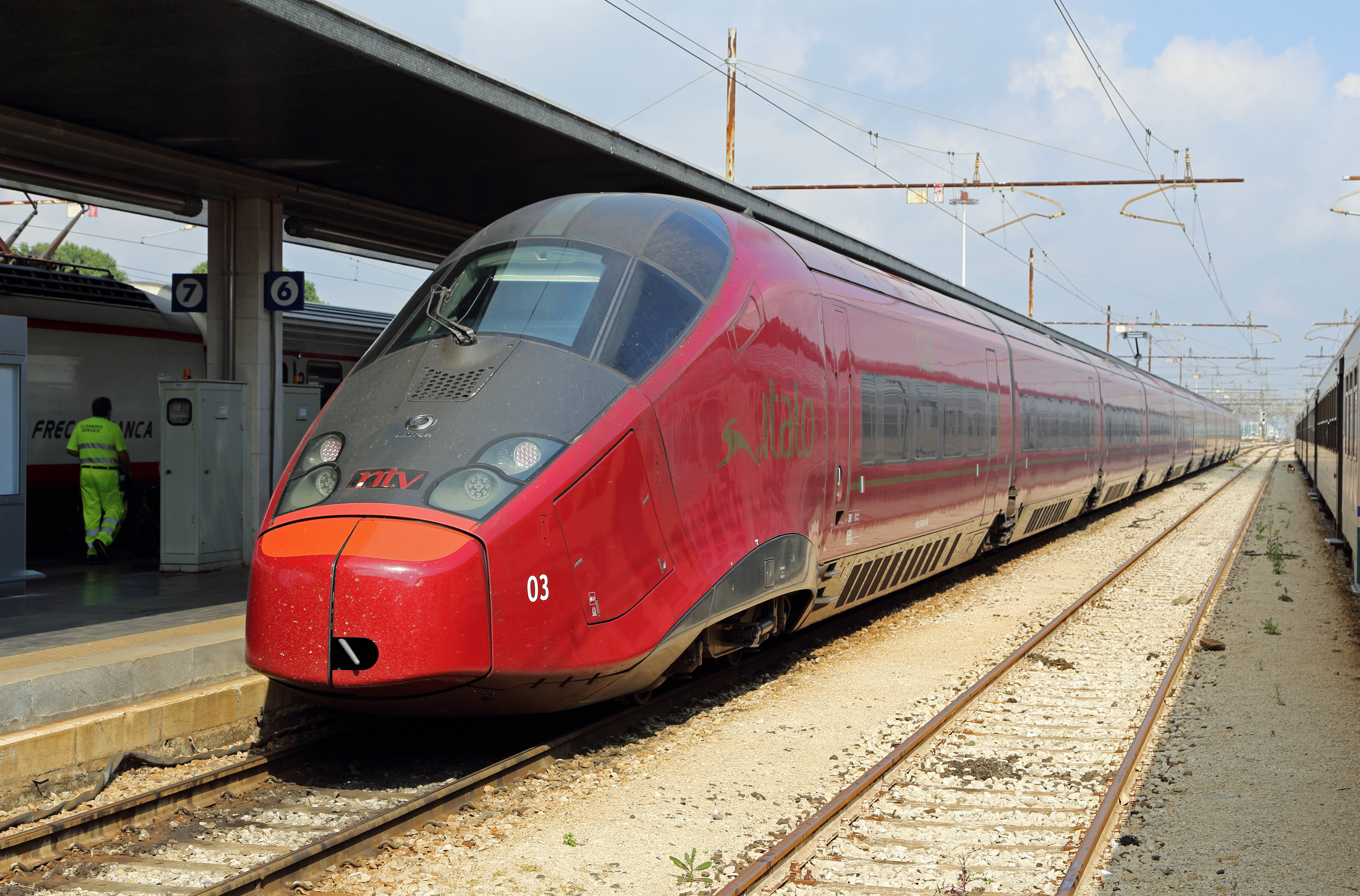
An Italo train at the station

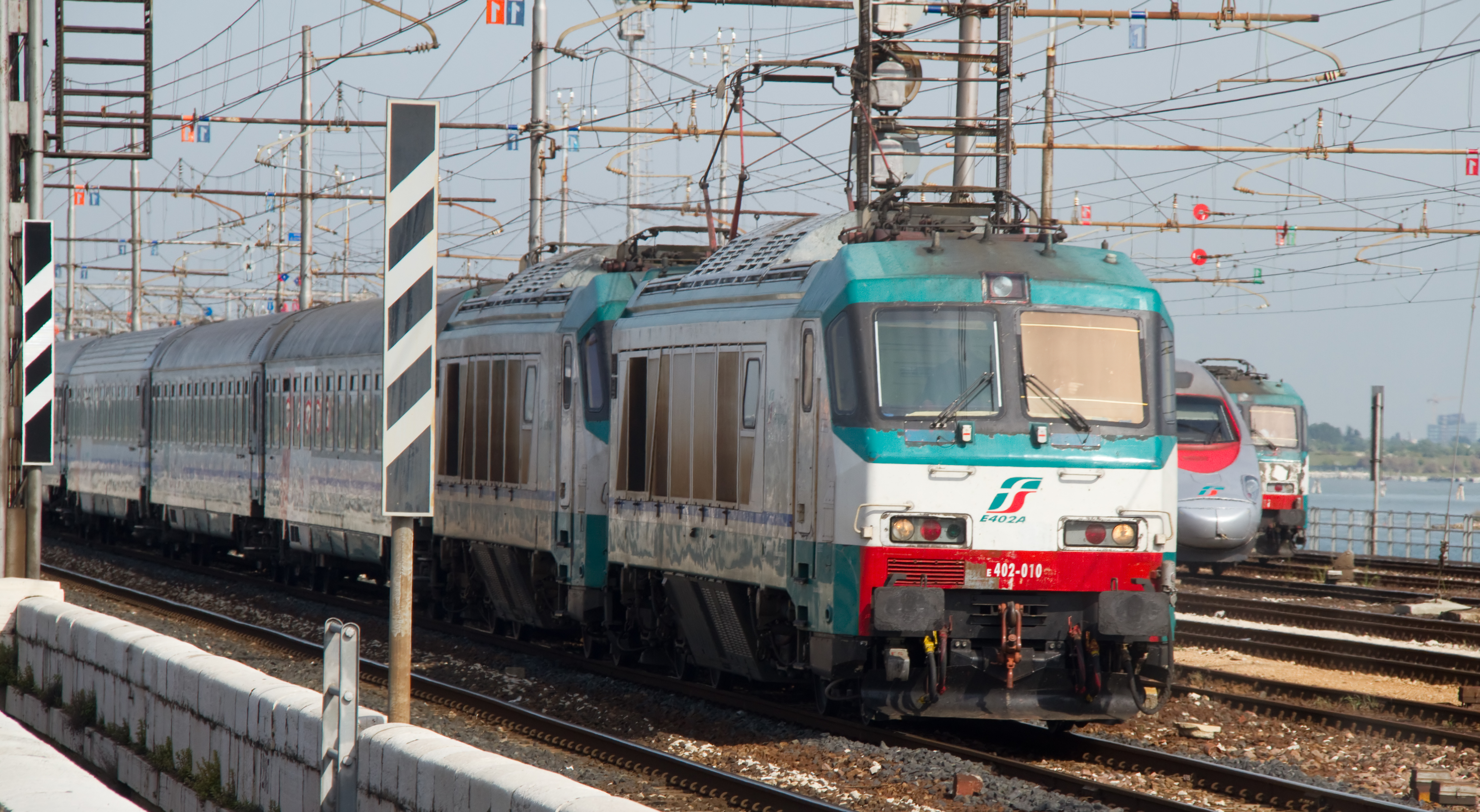
An Intercity Notte train arriving at the station

Construction of Santa Lucia railway station began in 1860 under the Austrian Empire. In order to make room for both the station building and its forecourt, a convent and the Church of Santa Lucia were demolished in 1861. The station in turn took up the name of this church.

The current station building is one of the few modernist buildings facing the Grand Canal. It is the result of a series of plans started up by the rationalist architect Angiolo Mazzoni in 1924 and developed by him over the next decade.

In 1934, a contest for a detailed design for the current station was won by Virgilio Vallot. Between 1936 and 1943, Mazzoni and Vallot collaborated on the construction of the station building; Mazzoni also designed the train hall. The final implementation, however, was undertaken only after the Second World War. In 1952, the station was completed on a design which had been developed by another architect, Paul Perilli.

In 1994 the former goods yard directly to the south west of the station which had been closed in the 1970s and used intermittently as a rail yard ever since was redeveloped to provide extra capacity resulting in 8 extra platforms increasing the total number of platforms from 15 to 23.

In November 2009, work began on the renovation of Santa Lucia station. The renovation programme would include improvements to the use of spaces and the flow of internal transit. In addition, certain architectural elements would be recovered and restored; the atrium would be altered to house several retail spaces. This project was completed in 2012 with a cost of 24 million euros.

== Features ==
As the current station building is low and wide, it does not dominate its surroundings. The flanks of its façade are decorated with Venetian lions. Behind the façade, there is a sizeable main hall with ticketing facilities, shops, offices and luggage storage facilities. The main hall also leads to the station's 15 internal platforms. Platforms 16–23 are situated outside in the redeveloped goods yard directly to the south east of the station.

== Train services ==
The station is served by the following services:

High-speed

- High-speed train (Trenitalia Frecciarossa) Venice-Salerno: Venice – Padua – Bologna – Florence – Rome – Naples – Salerno. (with extended services from Venice to Udine and Trieste, from Rome to Fiumicino airport, from Salerno to Calabria and from Paola to Sibari)
- High-speed train (Trenitalia Frecciarossa) Turin-Salerno: Turin – Milan – Reggio Emilia AV – Bologna – Florence – Rome – Naples – Salerno. (Some Frecciarossa routes have been extended from Milan to Brescia and Bergamo, from Florence to Arezzo and Perugia, from Rome Caserta, Benevento, Foggia, Bari and Lecce, and from Salerno to Reggio Calabria or Potenza and Taranto)
- High-speed train (Trenitalia Frecciarossa) Rome-Verona: Rome – Florence – Bologna – Verona (with extended services continuing on to Bolzano or Brescia/Bergamo. Extensions from Bologna to Modena and Mantua are also being planned)
- High-speed train (Trenitalia Frecciarossa) Turin-Lecce: Turin – Milan – Bologna – Rimini – Ancona – Foggia – Bari – Lecce/Taranto and Venice – Padua – Ferrara – Bologna – Rimini – Ancona – Foggia – Bari – Lecce
- High-speed train (Trenitalia Frecciarossa) Rome-Genoa: Rome – Florence – Pisa – La Spezia – Rapallo – Genoa
- High-speed train (Trenitalia Frecciarossa) Rome-Reggio Calabria: Rome – Naples Afragola – Salerno – Paola – Lamezia – Rosarno – Reggio Calabria
- High-speed train (Italo NTV) Venice-Salerno: Venice – Padua – Ferrara – Bologna – Florence – Rome – Naples – Salerno
- High-speed train (Italo NTV) Milan-Rome: Milan – Reggio Emilia – Bologna – Florence – Rome
- High-speed train (Italo NTV) non-stop Milan-Rome
- High-speed train (Italo NTV) Brescia-Rome: Brescia – Desenzano Del Garda – Peschiera Del Garda – Verona – Bologna – Florence – Rome
- High-speed train (Trenitalia Frecciarossa) Milan-Venice: Venice – Padua – Vicenza – Verona –Brescia – Milan (some routes have been extended, from Milan to Turin or Genoa, from Verona to Bolzano, and from Venice to Udine and Trieste)
- High-speed train (Trenitalia Frecciargento) Rome-Puglia: Rome – Caserta – Benevento – Puglia (with stops in Foggia, Barletta and Bari, and an extended service continuing on to Brindisi and Lecce)
- High-speed train (Trenitalia Frecciargento) Rome-Reggio Calabria: Rome – Naples Afragola – Salerno – Paola – Lamezia Terme – Rosarno – Villa S. G. – Reggio Calabria
- High-speed train (Trenitalia Frecciargento) Rome-Genoa: Rome – Florence – Pisa – La Spezia – Genoa
- High-speed train (Trenitalia Frecciabianca) Rome-Genoa: Rome – Pisa – La Spezia – Genoa (with extensions towards Milan or Turin and with stops in Civitavecchia, Grosseto, Campiglia M., Livorno, Viareggio and Massa)
- High-speed train (Trenitalia Frecciabianca) Rome-Ravenna: Rome – Terni – Foligno – Pesaro – Rimini – Ravenna (upgraded to Frecciargento)
- Night train (Trenitalia Intercity Notte) Trieste-Rome: Trieste/Triest – Gorizia/Görz – Udine – Trevisio – Venice (Santa Lucia) – Venice (Mestre) – Padua – Monselice – Rovigo – Ferrara – Bologna – Arezzo – Chiusi-Chiciano Terme – Rome
- Night train (Trenitalia Intercity Notte) Turin-Lecce: Alessandria – Voghera – Piacenza – Parma – Bologna – Rimini – Pescara – Termoli – San Severo – Foggia – Barletta – Bisceglie – Molfetta – Bari – Monopoli – Fasano – Ostuni – Brindisi
- Night train (Trenitalia Intercity Notte) Rome-Bolzano
- Night train (Trenitalia Intercity Notte) Milan-Lecce
- Night train (Trenitalia Intercity Notte) Milan-Palermo

Domestic

- Regional train (Trenitalia Regional Express) Venice-Bologna: Venice – Padua – Monselice – Rovigo – Ferrara – Bologna
- Regional train (Trenitalia Regional Express) Venice-Verona: Venice – Padua – Vicenza – San Bonifacio – Verona
- Regional train (Trenitalia Regional) Venice-Verona: Venice – Mira Mirano – Padua – Grisignano di Zocco – Vicenza – San Bonifacio – Verona
- Regional train (Trenitalia Regional) Venice-Udine: Venice – Treviso – Udine
- Regional train (Trenitalia Regional) Venice-Conegliano: Venice – Treviso – Conegliano
- Regional train (Trenitalia Regional) Venice-Portogruaro Caorle: Venice – Medolo – San Donà di Piave – Portogruaro Caorle
- Regional train (Trenitalia Regional) Venice-Trieste: Venice – Portogruaro Carole – Monfalcone – Trieste/Triest
- Regional train (Trenitalia Regional) Venice-Trieste via Gorizia: Venice – Treviso – Udine – Gorizia/Görz – Trieste/Triest
- Regional train (Trenitalia Regional) Venice-Adria: Venice – Piove di Sacco – Adria
- Regional train (Trenitalia Regional) Venice-Rovigo/Ferrara: Venice – Padua – Monselice – Rovigo – Ferrara
- Regional train (Trenitalia Regional) Venice-Bassano del Grappa: Venice – Piombino Dese – Castelfranco Veneto – Bassano del Grappa

Cross-border

(D for Germany, A for Austria, F for France, CH for Switzerland, GB for United Kingdom)

On 11 December 2016, all ÖBB EuroNight services were rebranded as "Nightjet".

- Intercity train (ÖBB Railjet operated by Trenitalia) Venice-Vienna: Venice – Treviso – Udine – Tarvisio – Villach (A) – Klagenfurt (A) – Leoben (A) – Bruck (A) – Wiener Neustadt (A) – Vienna (A)
- Intercity train (Trenitalia Eurocity) Geneva-Venice: Geneva/Genf (CH) – Lausanne (CH) – Montreux (CH) – Sion (CH) – Brig (CH) – Domodossola – Gallarate – Milan – Brescia – Peschiera del Garda – Verona – Padua – Venice
- Intercity train (ÖBB Eurocity operated by Trenitalia) Munich-Venice: Munich (D) – Rosenheim (D) – Innsbruck (A) – Brenner (A) – Bolzano – Verona – Venice
- Night train (ÖBB EuroNight operated by Trenitalia) Vienna-Venice: Vienna (A) – Wiener Neustadt (A) – Sankt-Pölten (A) – Linz (A) – Salzburg (A) – Villach (A) – Udine – Conegliano – Treviso – Venice
- Tourist train (Venice-Simplon Orient Express) Venice-London: Venice – Verona – Innsbruck (A) – Paris (East) (F) – London (Victoria) (GB) operated by Treni Turistici Italiani.

== Traffic ==
The station is used by about 82,000 passengers per day, or a total of around 30 million passengers per annum.

Every day, approximately 450 trains stop at the station. Long-distance trains use the central platforms, and the regional and suburban platforms are located to the west.

The station is the terminus of several famous trains, including the Venice Simplon Orient Express.

== Interchange ==
=== Overview ===
The station is connected with the rest of Venice by the Vaporetto (public water bus) or private water taxi boats. The nearby Piazzale Roma is the departure point for all car services and taxis for the mainland.

=== Vaporetto lines in the transit station ===
The stop (dock) is called Ferrovia and is served by eight Actv Vaporetto lines:

- 1 P.le Roma – Ferrovia – Rialto – San Marco – Lido
- 2 San Zaccaria – Giudecca – Tronchetto – P.le Roma – Ferrovia – Rialto – San Marco – (Lido)
- 4.1 Murano – F.te Nove – Ferrovia – P.le Roma – Giudecca – San Zaccaria – F.te Nove – Murano
- 4.2 Murano – F.te Nove – San Zaccaria – Giudecca – P.le Roma – Ferrovia – F.te Nove – Murano
- 5.1 Lido – F.te Nove – Ferrovia – P.le Roma – San Zaccaria – Lido
- 5.2 Lido – San Zaccaria – P.le Roma – Ferrovia – F.te Nove – Lido
- 3 Murano – Ferrovia – P.le Roma (direct line)
- N San Zaccaria – Giudecca – Tronchetto – P.le Roma – Ferrovia – Rialto – San Marco – Lido (night line)

== See also ==
- History of rail transport in Italy
- List of railway stations in Veneto
- Rail transport in Italy
- Railway stations in Italy
