= List of busiest subway lines in Italy =

List of the subway lines in Italy by absolute annual ridership

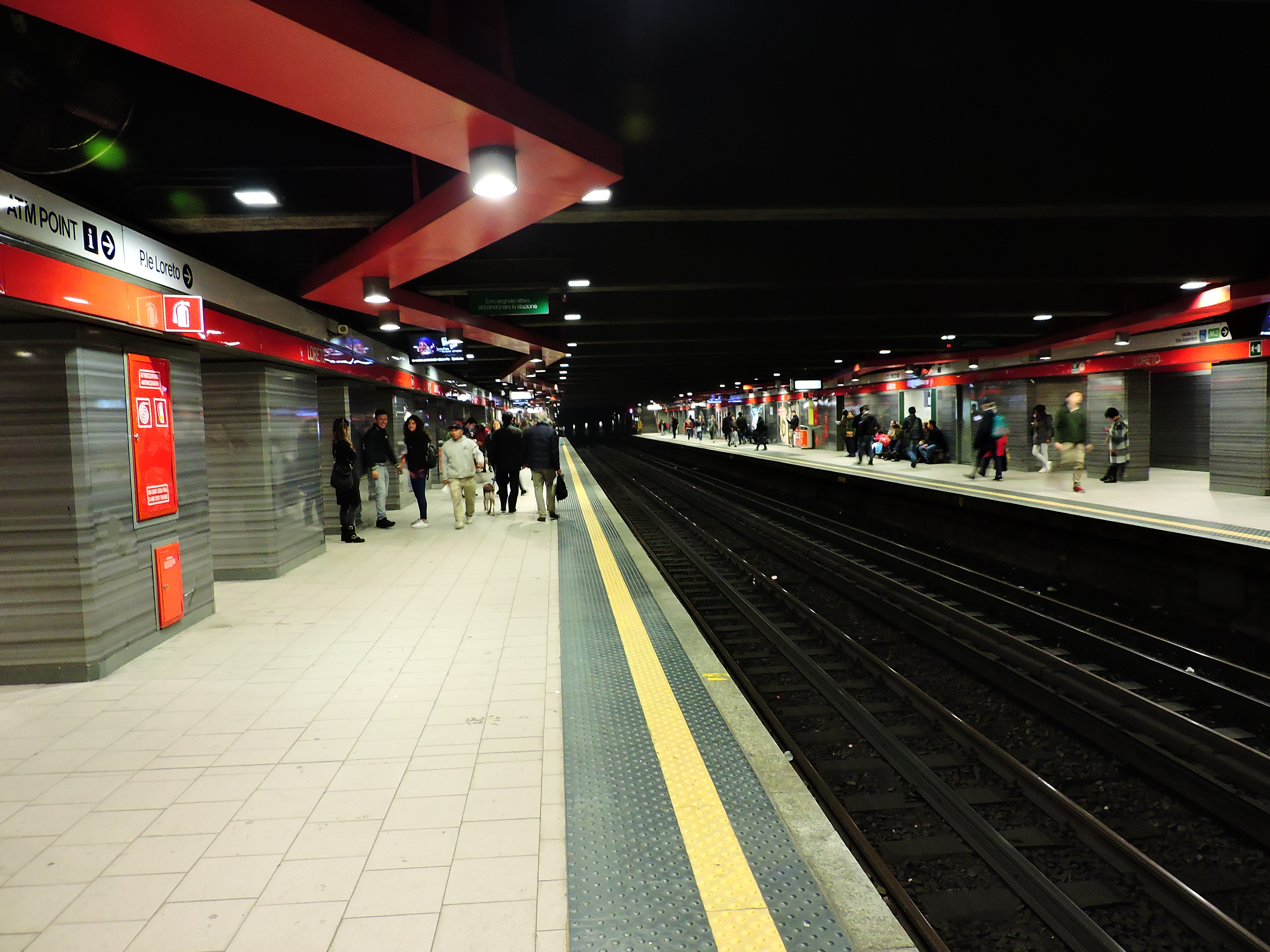
Loreto Station, a station of the M1 Line of Milan, the busiest line of Italy

This list includes all the subway systems in Italy, classified by absolute annual ridership and annual ridership per kilometer. All the subway lines in Italy are referred as Metro (shorter form of Metropolitana, lit. subway in English), they are all considered as Mass rapid underground transit, whose trains are different from the ones from the National railway company Trenitalia, and whose network is not linked to the national railway network. Their characteristics are quite different from each other: some of them are more similar to suburban railways, with a lower frequency, while others are more similar to tram lines, still called Metro.

The International Association of Public Transport (L'Union Internationale des Transports Publics, or UITP) defines metro systems as urban passenger transport systems, "operated on their own right of way and segregated from general road and pedestrian traffic".

As of January 2026, in Italy there are 7 subway systems, operating 17 subway lines.

City	Name	Service opened	Last expanded	Stations	Length	Annual ridership per km (pax/km)	Absolute annual ridership (pax)
Milan	Line 1	1964	2005	38	26,7 km	4,868,914	130,000,000
Milan	Line 2	1969	2011	35	39,9 km	3,007,519	120,000,000
Rome	Line A	1980	2000	27	18,4 km	5,125,000	94,300,000
Milan	Line 4	2022	2024	21	15 km	5,733,333	86,000,000
Milan	Line 3	1990	2011	21	17,3 km	4,450,867	77,000,000
Rome	Line B	1955	2015	26	22,9 km	2,720,524	62,300,000
Naples	Line 2	1925	2014	12	18,9 km	2,507,937	47,400,000
Naples	Line 1	1993	2025	20	20,7 km	2,144,928	44,400,000
Milan	Line 5	2013	2015	19	12,9 km	3,372,093	43,500,000
Turin	Line 1	2006	2021	23	15,1 km	2,649,007	40,000,000
Brescia	Line 1	2013	-	17	13,7 km	1,240,876	17,000,000
Rome	Line C	2014	2025	24	21,2 km	783,019	16,600,000
Genoa	Line 1	1990	2012	8	7,1 km	2,112,676	15,000,000
Catania	Line 1	1999	2024	12	8,7 km	804,598	7,000,000
Naples	Line 11	2005	2009	5	10,2 km	127,451	1,300,000
Naples	Line 6	2007	2024	8	5,5 km	120,000	660,000
Naples	Line 7	2025	-	2	2,5 km	-	-
