= Portogruaro–Caorle railway station =

Railway station in Italy

Portogruaro–Caorle
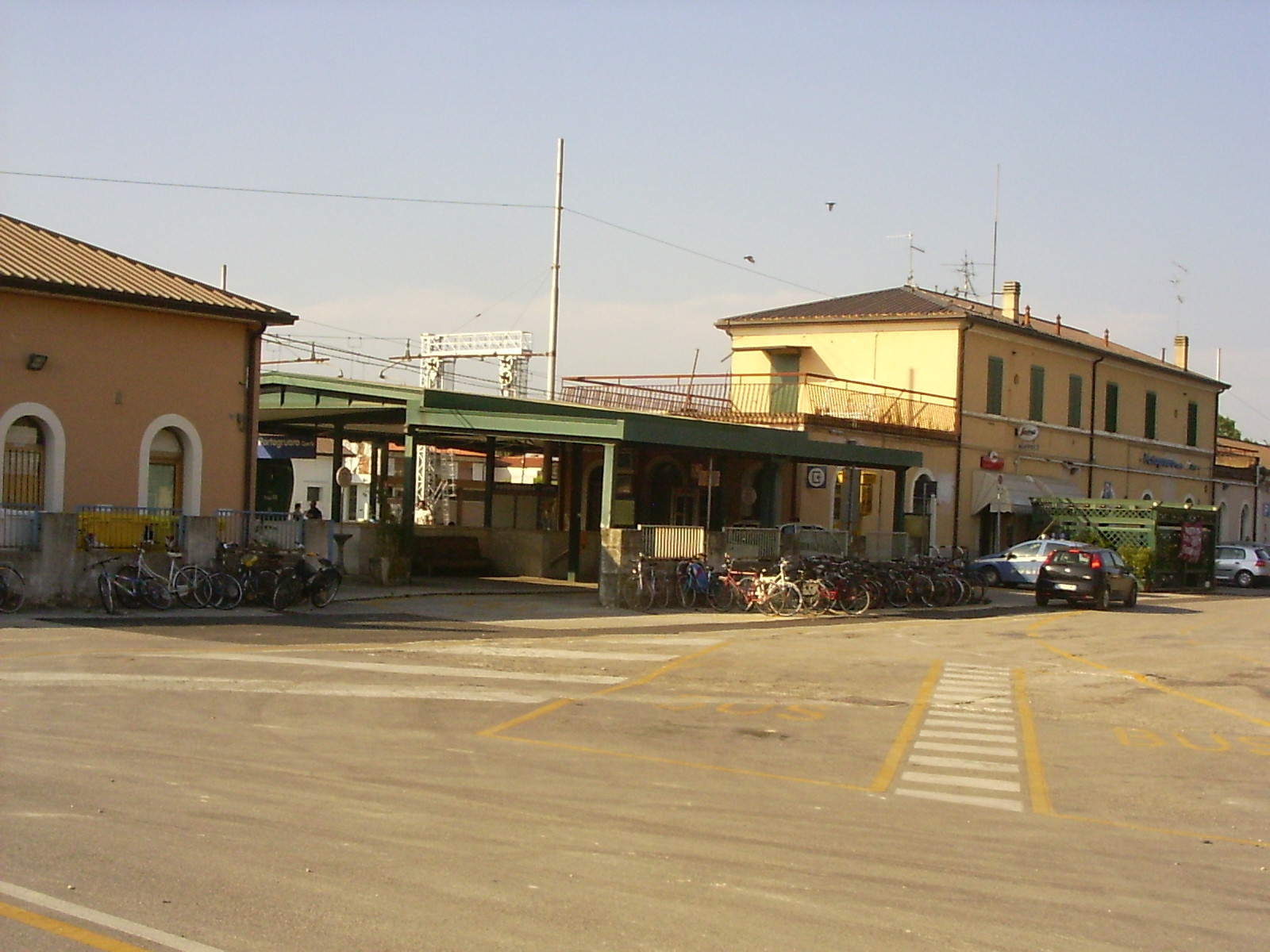
- Portogruaro–Caorle railway station

General information
- Location: Via Baron 46, Portogruaro, Veneto; Italy
- Coordinates: 45°46′52″N 12°49′55″E
- Owner: Rete Ferroviaria Italiana
- Operator: Trenitalia
- Lines: Venice–Trieste railway Treviso–Portogruaro railway Casarsa–Portogruaro railway
- Distance: 59.342 km (36.873 mi) from Venezia Mestre
- Platforms: 7

Other information
- Classification: Silver

History
- Opened: 1886; 140 years ago
Location
- Location within Veneto Location within Northern Italy Location within Italy

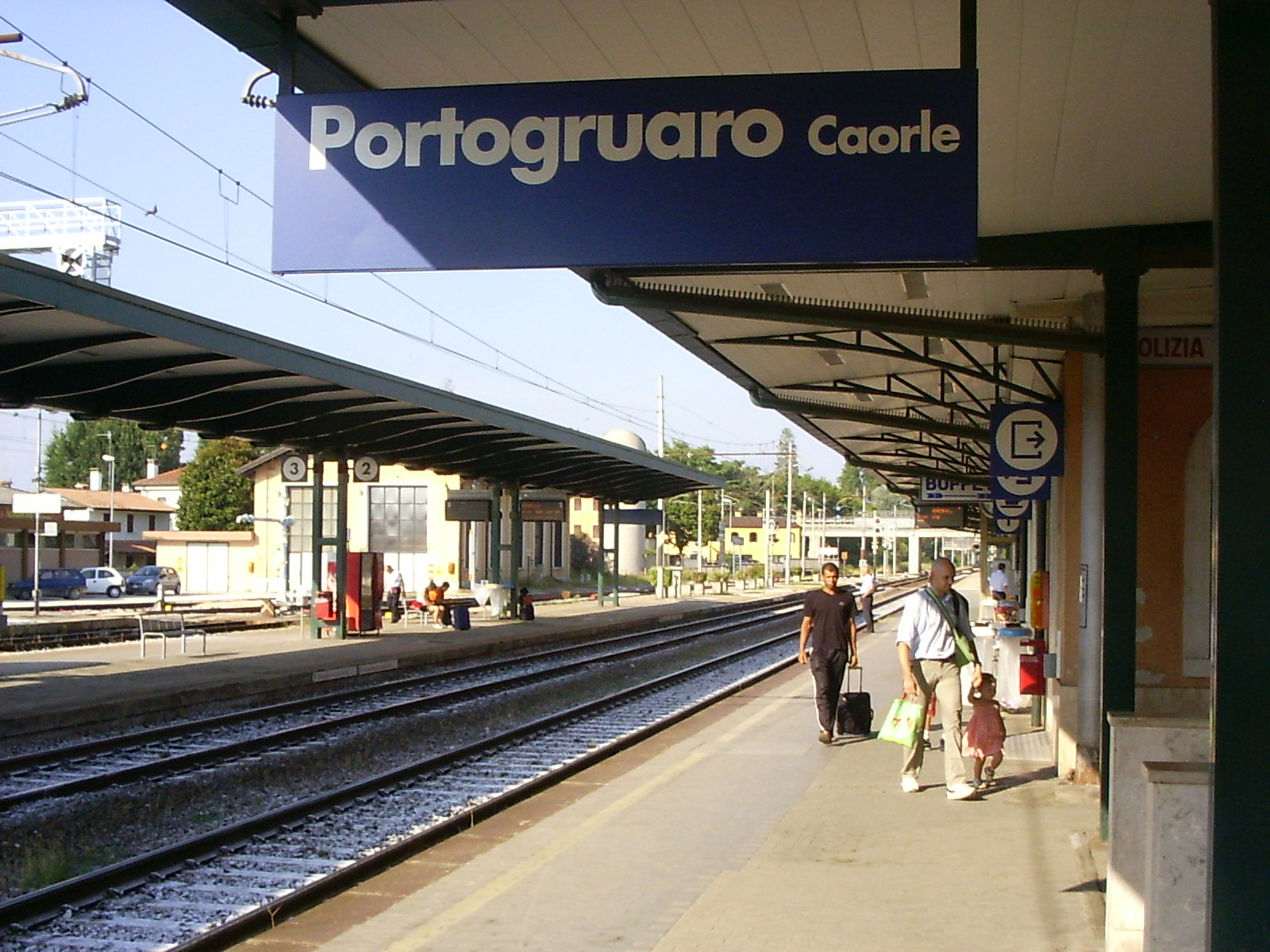
A view of the platforms.

Portogruaro–Caorle (Italian: Stazione di Portogruaro–Caorle) is a railway station serving the town of Portogruaro and the seaside resort of Caorle, in the region of Veneto, northern Italy. The station is located on the Venice–Trieste railway, Treviso–Portogruaro railway and Casarsa–Portogruaro railway. The train services are operated by Trenitalia.

== Modernisation ==
In 2011, as part of the restructuring of the services in the Veneto Region two new platforms were opened on the south side of the station for trains terminating from the Venice direction. In June 2013 a new bus station opened at the front of the station.

== Train services ==
The station is served by the following service(s):

- High speed services (Frecciarossa) Turin - Milan - Verona - Padua - Venice - Trieste
- Intercity services Rome - Florence - Bologna - Padua - Venice - Trieste
- Express services (Regionale Veloce) Venice - Portogruaro - Cervignano del Friuli - Trieste
- Express services (Regionale Veloce) Verona - Padua - Venice - Latisana
- Local services (Treno regionale) Venice - Portogruaro
- Local services (Treno regionale) Treviso - Portogruaro
- Local services (Treno regionale) Portogruaro - Casarsa della Delizia

== Bus services ==
Regular buses operate on the routes to Treviso and Casarsa supplementing the train service.

== See also ==
- History of rail transport in Italy
- List of railway stations in Veneto
- Rail transport in Italy
- Railway stations in Italy
