= Casarsa–Portogruaro railway =

Railway line in Italy

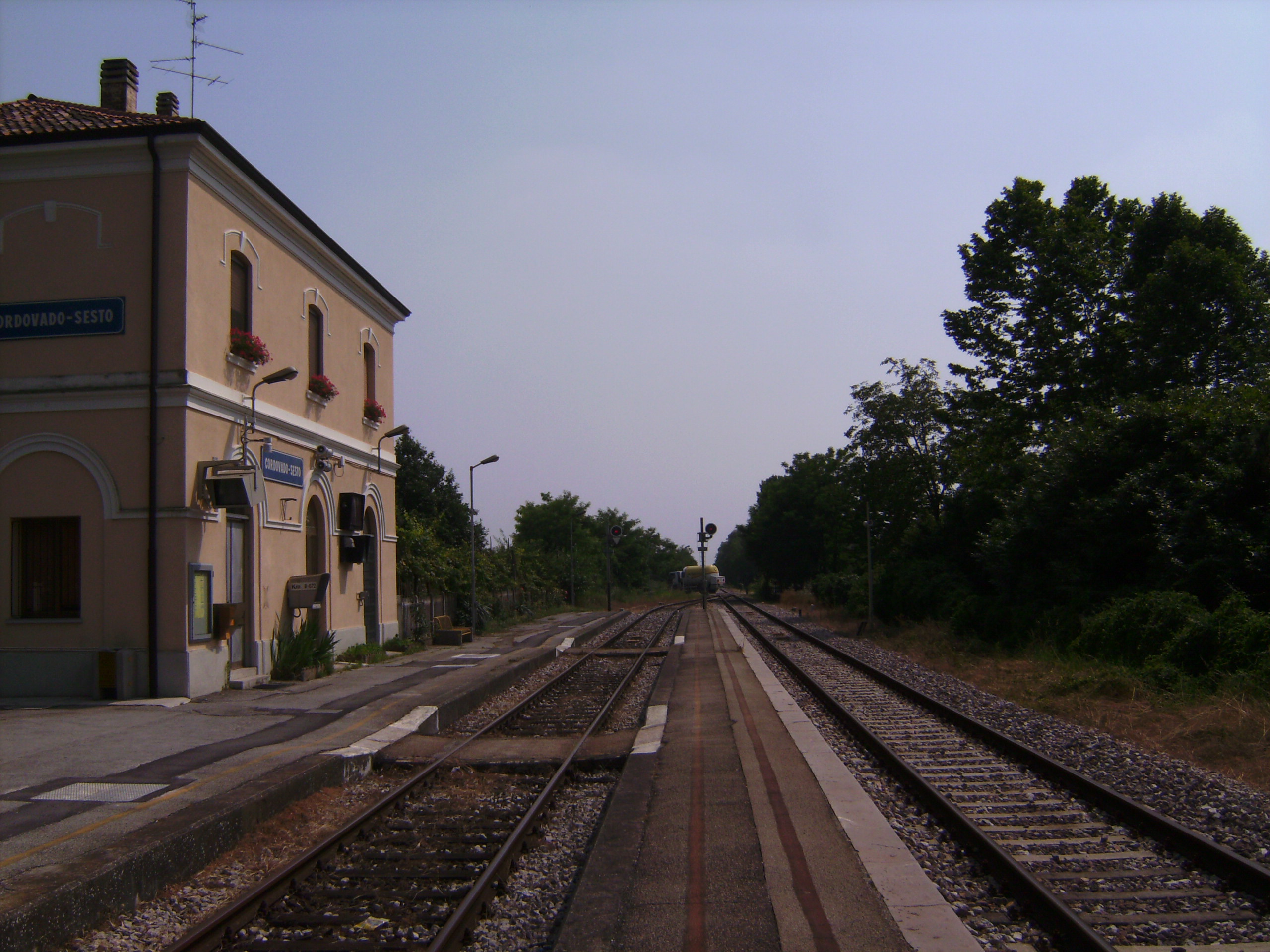
- Cordovado-Sesto railway station

Overview
- Status: in use
- Owner: Rete Ferroviaria Italiana
- Line number: 66
- Locale: Friuli-Venezia Giulia and Veneto, Italy
- Termini: Casarsa della Delizia; Portogruaro

Service
- Type: Heavy rail
- Operator(s): Trenitalia

History
- Opened: 19 August 1888

Technical
- Line length: 21 km (13 mi)
- Number of tracks: 1
- Track gauge: 1,435 mm (4 ft 8 1/2 in) standard gauge
- Electrification: none

The Casarsa–Portogruaro railway is a railway line in Italy. It was opened on 19 August 1888.

== See also ==
- List of railway lines in Italy
