= Circumflegrea railway =

Commuter railway line in Italy

Overview
- Status: Operational
- Locale: Metropolitan City of Naples, Campania, Italy

Service
- Type: Commuter rail
- System: Naples metropolitan railway service
- Operator(s): EAV

History
- Opened: 1963 (full system completed 1986)

Technical
- Line length: 27.042 km (16.803 mi)
- Track gauge: 1,435 mm (4 ft 8 1/2 in) standard gauge
- Electrification: 3 kV DC
Route map
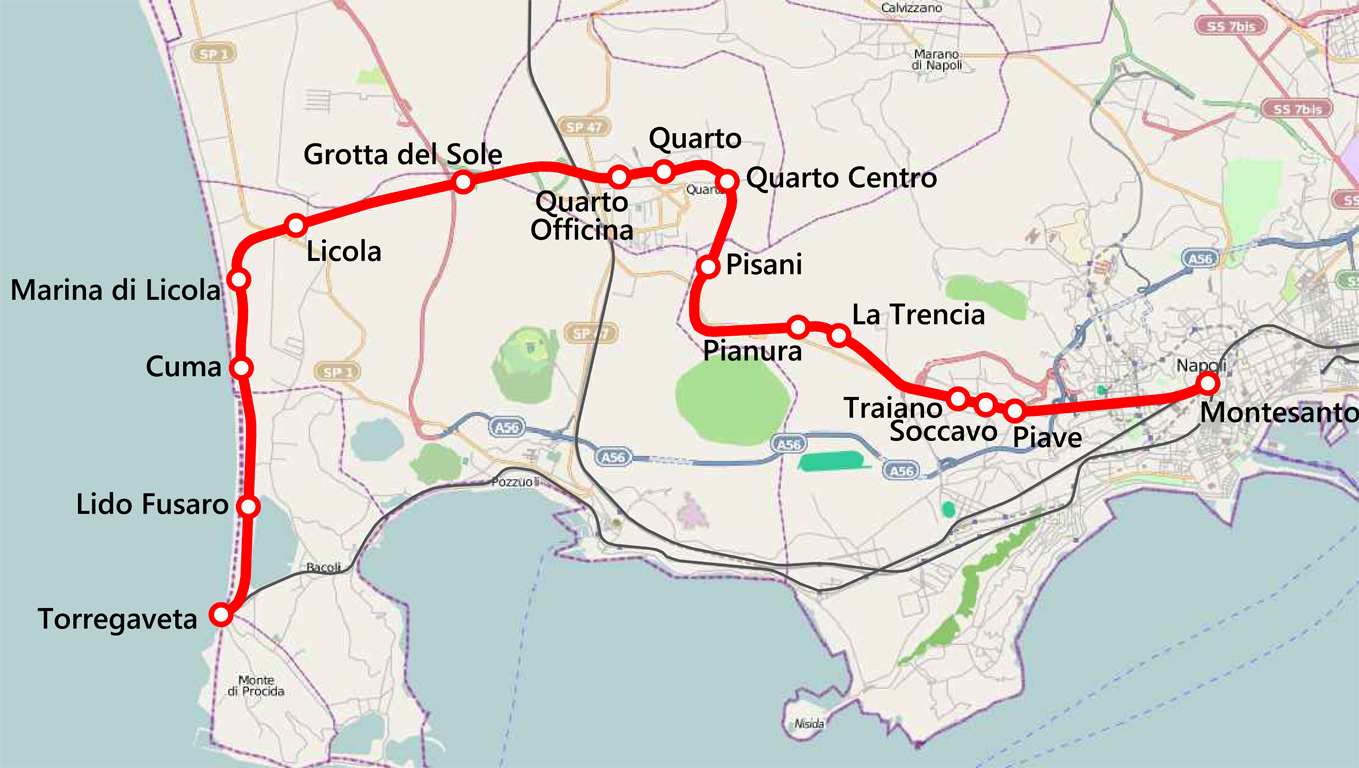
- Source: Italian railway atlas

The Circumflegrea railway (sometimes also known as Line 5) is a commuter railway line that connects Naples city centre with the northern Phlegraean Fields, a suburban area located west of the city. The line is operated by the Ente Autonomo Volturno (EAV) company.

== History ==
The line was projected in 1946 and works started in 1948.

The construction proceeded very slowly, and the first section (from Napoli Montesanto to Soccavo) was not opened until 1962; the railway was extended in 1968 to Marina di Licola; the last part was built but remained abandoned.

The complete railway was opened on 11 January 1986.

=== Projects ===
Construction commenced on a new branch line connecting Soccavo and Monte Sant'Angelo stations. This project, part of the planned Line 7, aims to link the existing Circumflegrea and Cumana railway lines, enhancing connectivity in the region.

The branch extends from Soccavo station, incorporating approximately 500 metres (1,600 ft) of trench work and a 2 kilometres (1.2 mi) double-track tunnel. Soccavo station has been upgraded to serve as an interchange, featuring a new platform, extended underpasses, modernized systems, and a new entrance with a green area.

Monte Sant'Angelo station, opened in 2025, designed by British-Indian architect Anish Kapoor, is notable for its distinctive entrances resembling fissures in the ground. These structures, made of corten steel and aluminum, have sparked discussions due to their unique design.

== Service ==
Trains run every 20 minutes between Montesanto and Licola; only a few trains continue to the terminus at Torregaveta.

According to a timetable posted in paper format at the station of Licola, all trains now (2018/11) end there.

== Route ==
Circumflegrea railway

Station	Opened	Transfers and notes
Montesanto	1962	Cumana railway
Piave	1962	
Soccavo	1962	
Traiano	1965	
La Trencia	1968	
Pianura	1968	
Pisani	1968	
Quarto Centro	1968	
Quarto	1968	
Quarto Officina	1968	
Grotta del Sole	1968	
Licola	1968	

== See also ==
- Naples metropolitan railway service
- List of suburban and commuter rail systems

== Bibliography ==
- Antonio Bertagnin: SEPSA in rinnovamento. In: ″TuttoTreno″ Nr. 150 (February 2002), pp. 14–17.
