= Railway stations in Italy =

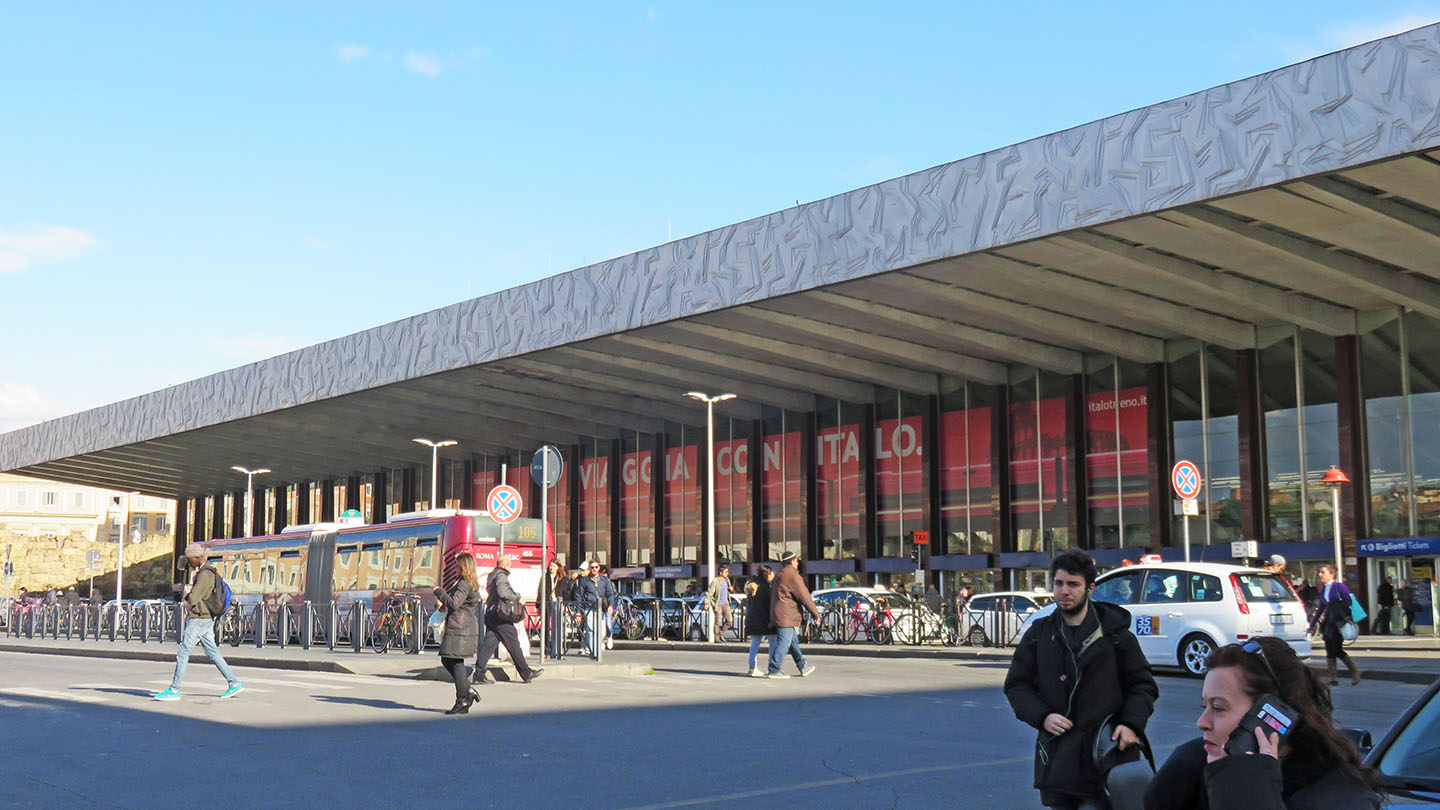
Roma Termini railway station

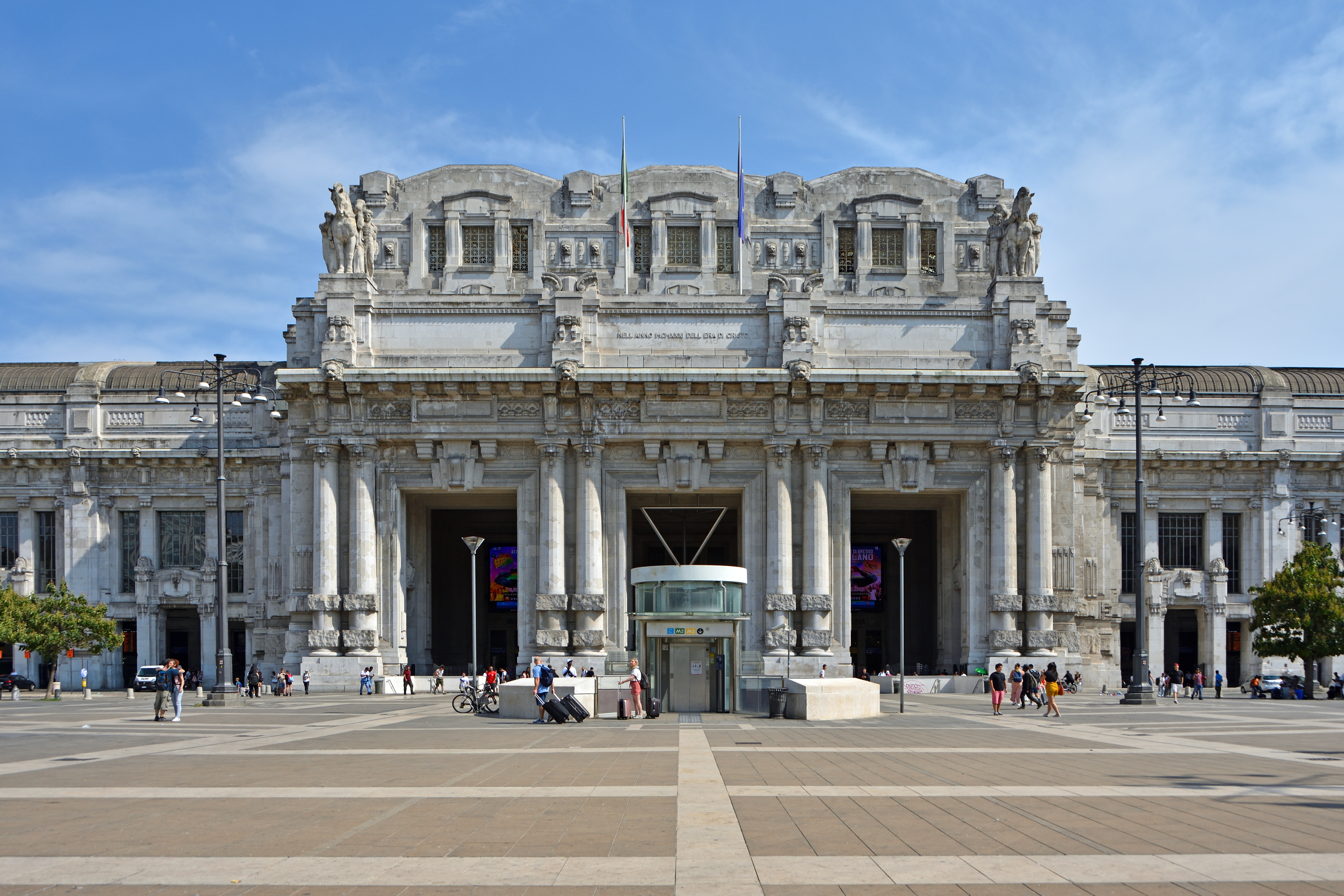
Milano Centrale railway station

Most railway stations in Italy are maintained and operated by RFI, a subsidiary of Ferrovie dello Stato Group. A minor part of them are operated by private and regional companies, conceded by the state.

== Stations by region ==
Lists of railway stations in Italy by region.

== Classification ==
RFI classifies stations into Platinum, Gold, Silver and Bronze categories.

=== Platinum ===
Major stations with over 6,000 passengers per day. As major interchanges they will have many departures and arrivals daily, and will be served by high-speed/long-distance services. They are the principal stations for the Italian cities they serve. They have the highest commercial potential (both fares and revenue from on-site merchants).

- Bari Centrale
- Bologna Centrale
- Firenze Santa Maria Novella
- Genova Piazza Principe
- Genova Brignole
- Milano Centrale
- Milano Porta Garibaldi
- Napoli Centrale
- Padova
- Palermo Centrale
- Pisa Centrale
- Roma Ostiense
- Roma Termini
- Roma Tiburtina
- Torino Porta Nuova
- Venezia Santa Lucia
- Venezia Mestre
- Verona Porta Nuova

=== Gold ===
Gold stations have high traffic levels. These include major urban inter-changes and stations serving large towns. They have a lower commercial potential.

=== Silver ===
This class includes all other small to medium-sized stations served by metropolitan and regional services. Some of these may be served by long-distance services.

=== Bronze ===
Small stations with low passenger numbers. This includes minor stations served by regional services.

== Busiest stations ==
Rank	Railway Station	Annual entries/exits (millions)	Number of platforms	City	Region
1	Roma Termini	150	32	Rome	Lazio
2	Milano Centrale	145	24	Milan	Lombardy
3	Torino Porta Nuova	70	20	Turin	Piedmont
4	Firenze Santa Maria Novella	59	19	Florence	Tuscany
5	Bologna Centrale	58	28	Bologna	Emilia-Romagna
6	Roma Tiburtina	51	20	Rome	Lazio
7	Napoli Centrale	50	25	Naples	Campania
8	Milano Cadorna	33.1	10	Milan	Lombardy
9	Venezia Mestre	31	13	Venice	Veneto
10	Venezia Santa Lucia	30	16	Venice	Veneto

== Operation ==
Grandi Stazioni is the commercial operator of 13 platinum-level railway stations. Centostazioni operates another 103 stations, including Milano Porta Garibaldi, Padova and Pisa Centrale. Both companies are owned by Ferrovie dello Stato.

== See also ==
- Ferrovie dello Stato Italiane
- Rail transport in Italy
- List of railway stations
- List of busiest subway lines in Italy
