= Mobilità di Marca =

Mobilità di Marca S.p.A.
- Company type: Limited Company
- Industry: Transportation
- Founded: December 30th, 2011, Treviso, Italy
- Founders: Province of Treviso, Treviso City Council, Vittorio Veneto City Council, Castelfranco Veneto City Council, ATAP Pordenone, ATVO San Donà di Piave.
- Headquarters: Via Polveriera, 1 - 31100 TREVISO
- Number of locations: Castelfranco Veneto, Montebelluna, Conegliano, Vittorio Veneto
- Key people: chairmen: President Giulio Sartor
- Products: Public Transportation
- Number of employees: 608 (2012)
- Website: www.mobilitadimarca.it

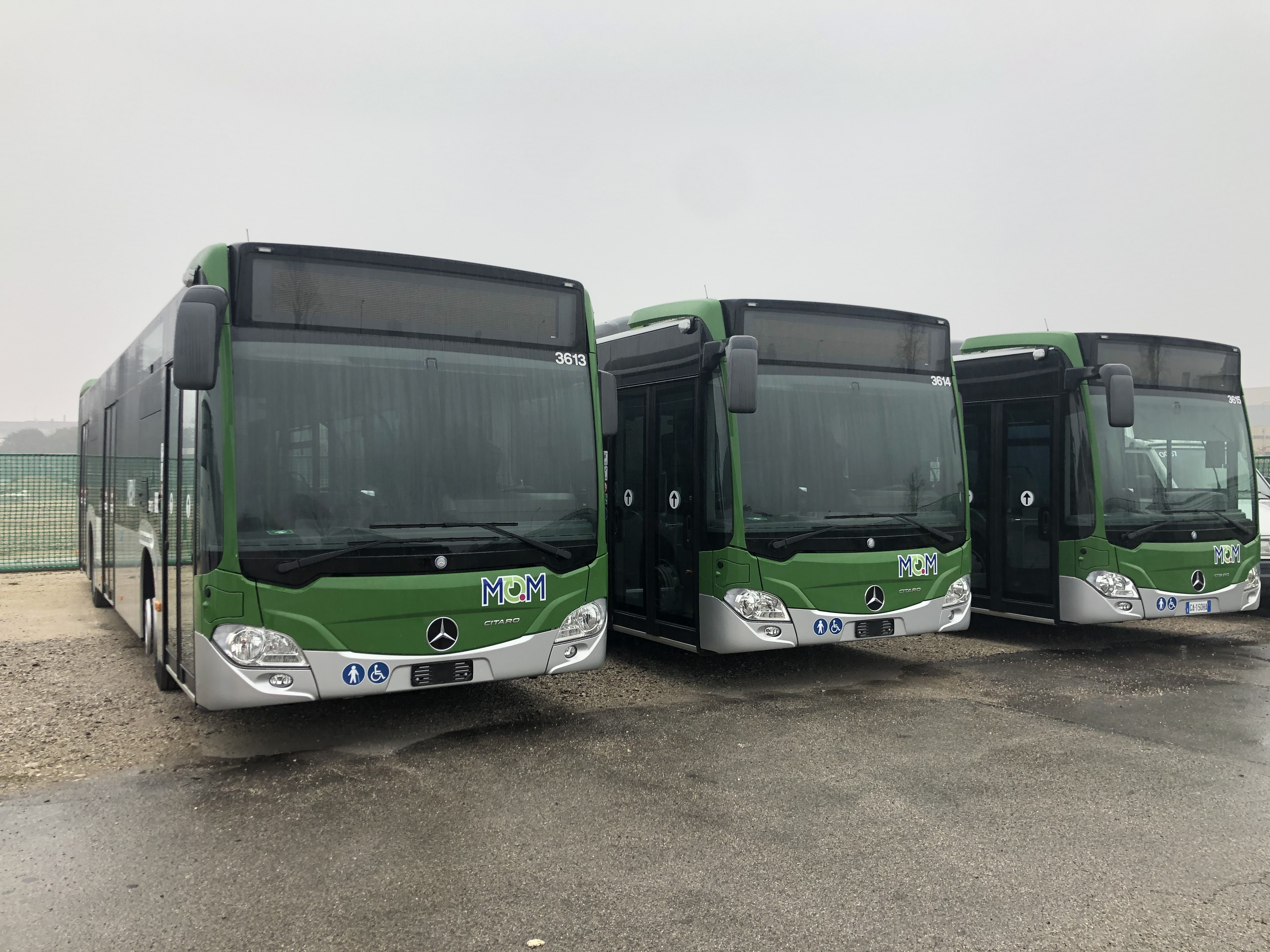
Mobilità di Marca Mercedes-Benz Citaro buses

Mobilità di Marca S.p.A. (MOM) is the unique public transportation company based on buses in the Province of Treviso, working since December 30, 2011.

== History ==
In 2008, the Province of Treviso, as a financial corporation for local public transportation, launched the merging project for the four companies which worked as far as that sector was concerned, that is to say ACTT, La Marca, CTM and ATM.

MOM was officially founded on December 30, 2011 and a technical period was tested until December 31, 2013 to redesign workers' contracts, transport lines and a single tariff plan, in order to create a big economical society.

== Network ==
MOM runs the following services (incidentally, the original company):

- Urban services:

- Treviso (ACTT: 13 lines)
- Conegliano (ATM: 6 lines)
- Vittorio Veneto (ATM: 6 lines)
- Montebelluna (La Marca: 4 lines)
- Asolo (CTM: 1 line)

- Suburban and out-of-town services:

- Castelfranco Veneto and the piedmont area (CTM & La Marca)
- Conegliano and Vittorio Veneto (ATM)
- Oderzo (La Marca)
- Other areas (La Marca & CTM)

- Airport connections:

- "Canova" Airport in Treviso (ACTT & La Marca)
- "Marco Polo" Airport in Venice (ACTT with ATVO)

== Conegliano Urban Service ==
- 41 Via XXIV Maggio-Crevada
- 42 Via Matteotti-Via dei Mille
- 43 Via San Giuseppe-Bagnolo
- 44 Conegliano-Ogliano
- 45 Conegliano-Nostra Famiglia

== Montebelluna Urban Service ==
- 81 Montebelluna-Busta-Montebelluna
- 82 Montebelluna-Busta-San Gaetano-Montebelluna
- 83 Montebelluna-Sant'Andrea-San Gaetano-Montebelluna
- 84 Montebelluna-Via Castellana-Sant'Andrea-Montebelluna

== Vittorio Veneto Urban Service ==
- 31 Ospedale-Vittorio Veneto-Longhere
- 32 Sant'Apollonia-Vittorio Veneto-Santi Pietro e Paolo
- 33 Vittorio Veneto-Carpesica
- 34 Vittorio Veneto-San Giacomo
- 35 Vittorio Veneto-Ponte Maset
- 36 Vittorio Veneto-Fais

== Treviso Urban Service ==
- 1 Ospedale-Stazione FS-Piazza Matteotti-Santa Maria del Rovere-Sant'Artemio-Carità-Catena-Villorba
- 3 Stazione FS-Fiera-Silea-Lanzago-Cendon-Sant'Elena
- 4 Casier-Sant'Antonino-Stazione FS-Fontane-Carità
- 6 Stazione FS-Piazza Duomo-San Giuseppe-Aeroporto-Quinto di Treviso
- 7 Sant'Artemio-Stadio-Piazza Matteotti-Stazione FS-San Lazzaro-San Zeno
- 8 Piazza Vittoria-Stazione FS-San Lazzaro-Frescada-San Trovaso-Sambughè
- 8E Treviso FS-Preganziol-Mogliano-Mestre-Venezia (jointly operated with ACTV)
- 9 San Paolo-San Liberale-Piazza Papa Pio X-Stazione FS-Dosson-Conscio/Preganziol
- 10 Treviso FS-Carbonera-Pezzan-Mignagola
- 11 Padernello-Paese-Piazzale Pistoia-Treviso FS
- 12 Carità-San Sisto-Catena-Castrette-Carità
- 21 Castagnola-Paese-Piazza Papa Pio X-Treviso FS
- 55 Quinto di Treviso-Canizzano-Sant'Angelo-San Zeno-Treviso FS-San Bona-Merlengo
- 61 Treviso FS-San Pelajo-Ponzano-Paderno-Sant'Antonio/Barrucchella Camalò
- SCO (dedicated school services for students of schools in Treviso)

== See also ==
- Treviso
- Province of Treviso
