= Lotto Sport Italia =

Italian sports equipment manufacturer

Coordinates: 45.7405836°N 12.0627287°E

- Type: Private
- Industry: Textile; Sports equipment
- Founded: 1939; 87 years ago in Montebelluna, Italy
- Founder: Caberlotto family
- Headquarters: Trevignano, Italy
- Area served: Worldwide
- Products: Sportswear, casual wear, sneakers, football boots
- Brands: Legenda; Works
- Website: lottosport.com

Lotto Sport Italia is an Italian sports equipment manufacturer based in Trevignano, near Treviso. The company manufactures and commercialises sporting and casual clothing and footwear (including sneakers, and football boots). Its clothing line includes T-shirts, jackets, shorts, leggings, and goalkeeper gloves.

== History ==
Lotto was established in 1939 by the Caberlotto family (who were the owners of the football team F.C. Treviso) in Montebelluna, northern Italy, the world centre of footwear manufacturing. In June 1973, Lotto made its debut as a sports footwear manufacturer. Tennis shoes signaled the beginning of production, followed by models for basketball, volleyball, athletics and football.

Sports clothing was the company's next venture. In the first ten years, Lotto focused on the Italian market; during its first decade, corporate strategy concentrated on making tennis footwear and clothing, and early on sponsored big names from the professional tennis circuit (Martina Navratilova, Boris Becker, Thomas Muster, and Andrea Gaudenzi).

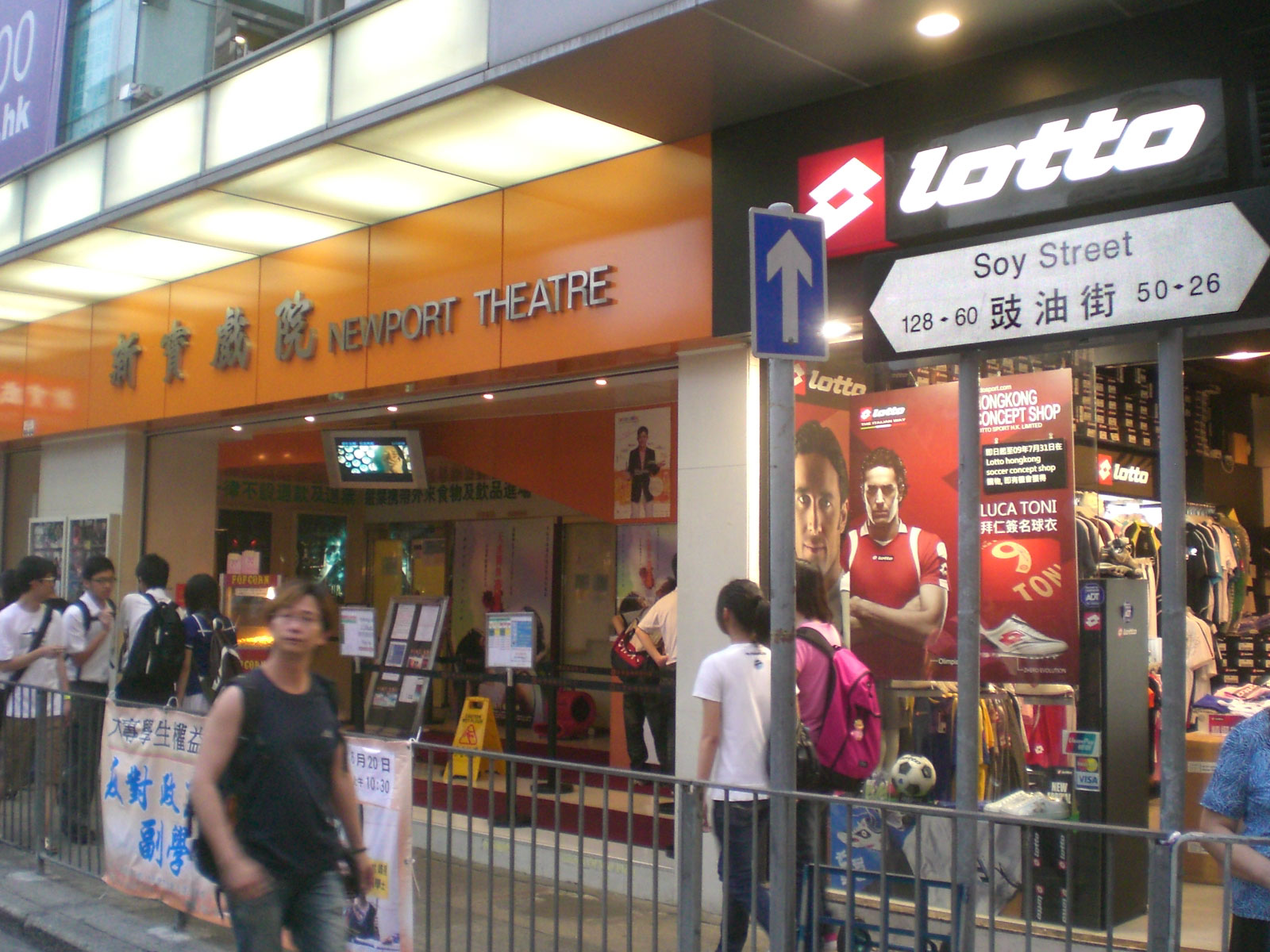
The Lotto shop in Hong Kong

In the 1980s, Lotto moved on to broaden its business base by competing among the then-small group of manufacturers of football boots and clothing. Lotto began to create its first football boot models and signed major collaboration agreements with internationally renowned players and teams. Tennis players John Newcombe, Andrés Gómez and José Luis Clerc wore the brand's tennis products.

The first sponsorship agreements in football were signed with players (Dino Zoff and Ruud Gullit) and teams, such as Milan (1993–98), the Dutch national team, Napoli (1994–97), Juventus (2000–03), Chievo and Spanish club Real Zaragoza. Professional footballers provided input in both the design and fine-tuning of the products. This involvement together with the athletes' public images helped make the company a leader in tennis and football. During this same period, Lotto expanded into the export market, and its international business grew rapidly. Ten years later, the brand was being distributed in more than 60 countries around the world.

In June 1999, the company was taken over a group of local business people who were already very active in the sports area. It was headed by Andrea Tomat, who took on the role of President and CEO of the new company. The company was renamed Lotto Sport Italia. Andrea Tomat, leading the company, rebranded the business by focusing on football and tennis, outsourcing about 90% of footwear and apparel production to the Far East. He established a logistics hub in Hong Kong as a distribution center and invested in research. During the 2006 FIFA World Cup, he launched Zhero Gravity, the first laceless sports shoe. The following year, he introduced SynPulse, a tennis shoe that absorbs shocks and converts them into energy.

In 2007, Lotto Sport Italia acquired the American brand Etonic, specializing in technical running, golf, and bowling. By the end of 2016, the company announced the integration of Lotto (with €280 million in revenues in 2016) and Stonefly (with €80 million in revenue). Despite maintaining separate brand identities and legal structures, they optimized several functions. Lotto focused on sports and fashion, while Stonefly targeted the urban and comfort sectors.

Today, Lotto distributes its products in more than 70 countries through independent sports stores, specialty chain stores and large stores with sports departments; the brand used on wristwatches is Lotto Time. The company is pushing the development of corner and flagship stores, which are now widespread in Italy and in other countries.

== Distribution ==
Lotto distributes its products in over 110 different countries through independent sports article stores, specialized chain-stores and large stores with specialized sports departments. Special emphasis is placed on monobrand stores (flagship stores, street stores, factory outlets) as well as corners and shop-in-shops.

Sponsorships are an important part of Lotto's business. In addition to its latest agreement with USPTA and its technical partnerships with the ATP, WTA Tour and Wimbledon, Lotto is visible at all Grand Slam tournaments and championship series and has been a part of the Italian Open for more than 30 years. More than 120 professional players now wear the "double diamond" logo, including the No. 1-ranked women's doubles team of Virginia Ruano Pascual and Paola Suárez.

== See also ==
Excludes articles found in Category:Sporting goods manufacturers of Italy.

- Sergio Tacchini
