= Giovanni Battista Nicolai =

Italian mathematician (1726–1793)

- Born: 30 March 1726
- Died: 15 July 1793 (aged 67)

Academic work
- Discipline: mathematics
- Institutions: University of Padua

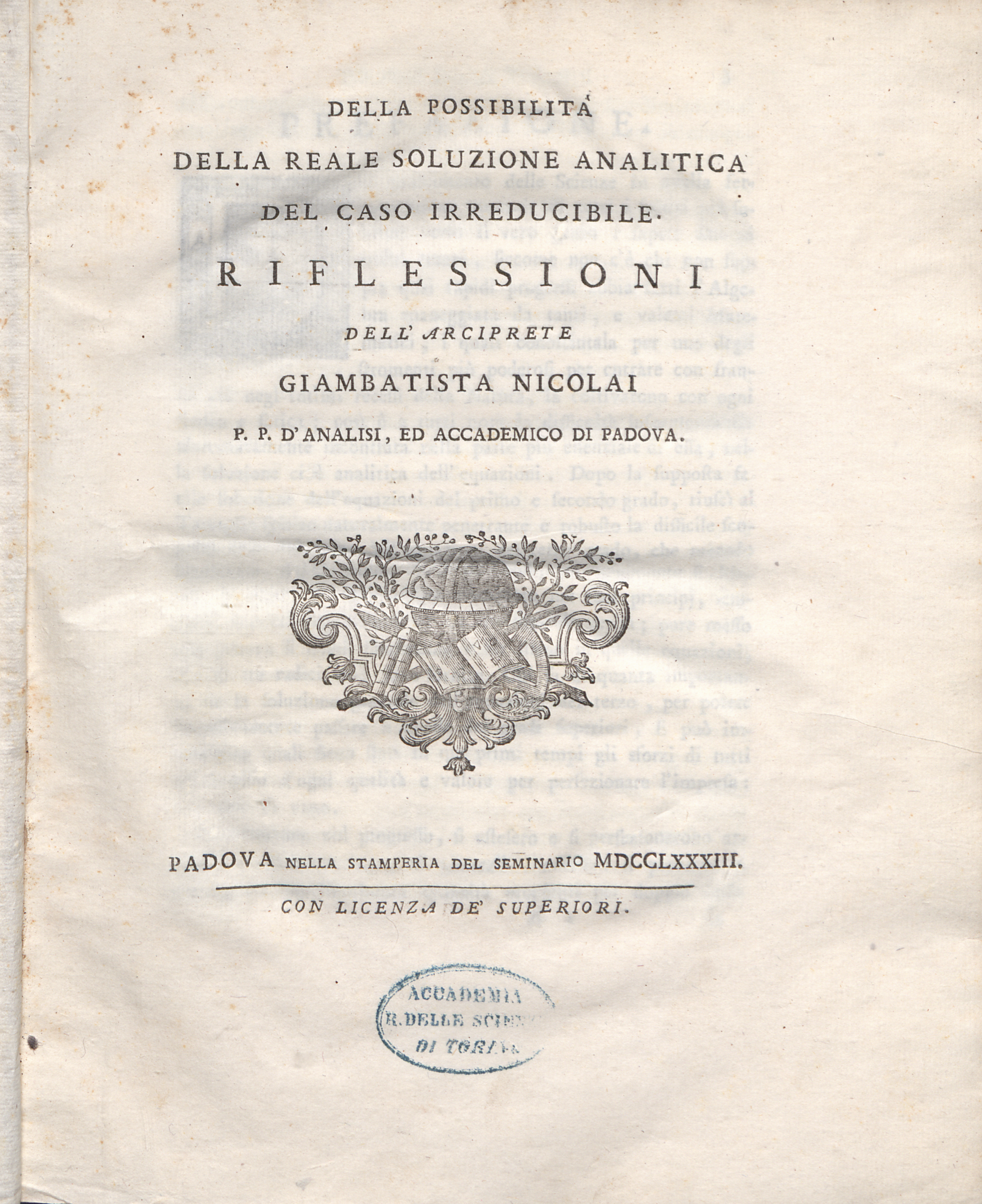
Della possibilità della reale soluzione analitica del caso irreducibile, 1783

Giovanni Battista Nicolai (30 March 1726 – 15 July 1793) was an Italian mathematician and professor at the University of Padua. He was archpriest of Padernello, a frazione of Paese.

== Works ==
- Dissertazioni due fisico-matematiche (in Italian). Padua: Tipografia del Seminario. 1772.
- Della possibilità della reale soluzione analitica del caso irreducibile (in Italian). Padua: Tipografia del Seminario. 1783.
- Nova analyseos elementa (in Latin). Vol. 1. Padua: Tipografia del Seminario. 1786. Bibcode:1786nae..book.....N.
- Nova analyseos elementa (in Latin). Vol. 2. Padua: Tipografia del Seminario. 1793.
