= Treviso Airport =

Treviso Airport Aeroporto di Treviso A. Canova

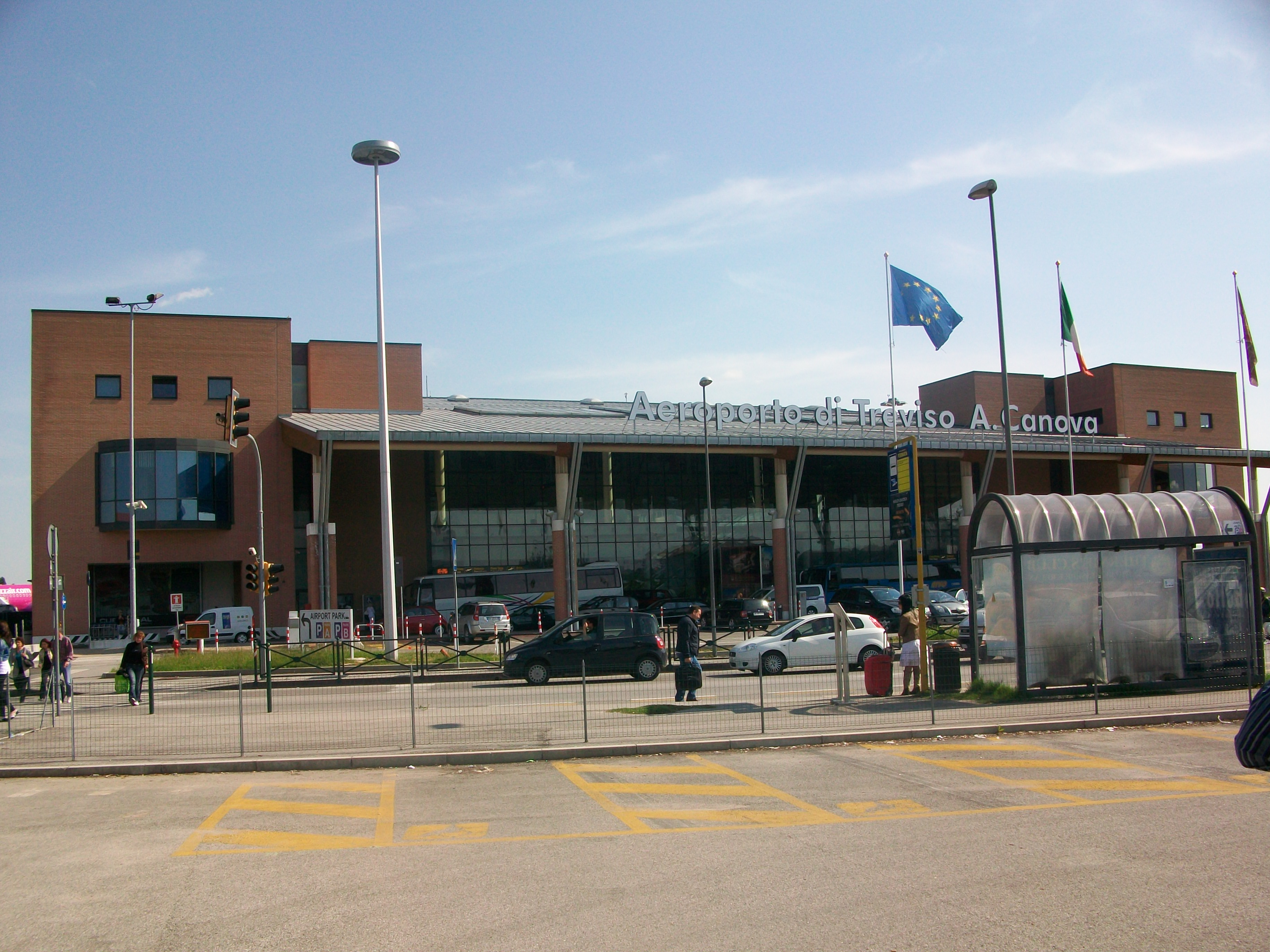
- IATA: TSF; ICAO: LIPH

Summary
- Airport type: Military / public
- Owner: SAVE Group
- Operator: Aer Tre S.P.A.
- Serves: Treviso, Venice and Padua
- Location: Treviso, Italy
- Focus city for: Ryanair
- Elevation AMSL: 59 ft (18 m)
- Coordinates: 45°39′03″N 012°11′52″E
- Website: trevisoairport.it

Map
- Location of airport in Italy TSF (Italy)

Runways
Direction	Length		Surface
Direction	m	ft	Surface
07/25	2,420	7,940	Asphalt

Statistics (2024)
- Passengers: 3,048,943
- Passenger change 23-24: ▲0.5%
- Aircraft movements: 21,685
- Movements change 23-24: ▼ -3.7%
- Cargo (tons): 0
- Cargo change 23-24: N/A
- Source: Italian AIP at EUROCONTROL; Statistics from Assaeroporti

Treviso Airport, Italian: Aeroporto di Treviso A. Canova (IATA: TSF, ICAO: LIPH), sometimes Venice-Treviso Airport, is an international airport located 1.6 NM (3.0 km; 1.8 mi) west-southwest of Treviso and approximately 31 km (19 mi) away from the city of Venice, Italy. It is used mainly by low-cost airlines.

Some airlines refer to the airport unofficially as "Venice-Treviso" or similar. The primary airport serving Venice is Venice Marco Polo Airport.

The airport has provoked several disputes of the inhabitants of the urban centers of Quinto di Treviso and Treviso given by low-altitude flights, as well as the proximity to the protected area of the Regional Natural Park of the Sile River. Several committees against the airport have been formed, and questions have been posed by civil organizations, including Legambiente.

== Overview ==
The airport stands 18 metres (59 ft) above sea level. The runway direction is 07/25 with an asphalt surface 2,420 m (7,940 ft) long and 45 m (150 ft) wide. The new terminal was opened in 2007. It was named after Antonio Canova, a famous Italian sculptor.

In December 2020, Ryanair announced it would open a new base at the airport consisting of 18 new routes in addition to several existing ones.

== Airlines and destinations ==
The following airlines operate regular scheduled and charter flights at Treviso Airport:

Airlines	Destinations
Dan Air	Seasonal: Bacău
Ryanair	Alicante, Beauvais, Birmingham, Bucharest–Otopeni, Budapest, Charleroi, Eindhoven, Gdańsk, Katowice, Madrid, Malta, Marrakesh, Marseille, Palma de Mallorca, Porto, Prague, Riga, Santander, Seville, Sofia, Tenerife–South, Tirana, Toulouse, Valencia, Vienna, Vilnius, Warsaw–Modlin, Wrocław; Seasonal: Amman–Queen Alia, Chania, Corfu, Crotone, East Midlands, Kos, Menorca, Poznań
Wizz Air	Bucharest–Otopeni, Iași, Suceava, Tirana; Seasonal: Timișoara

== Ground transportation ==
=== Road ===
The airport has four parking areas. Three are long-term car parks with a total of 564 places. In front of the terminal building there are an additional 50 parking spaces for short term parking.

=== Bus ===
A public bus service, operated by Mobilità di Marca, connects the airport with the railway station (the Treviso Centrale railway station) in the centre of Treviso. Another bus service, connecting with flights for Wizzair and Ryanair, operated by BARZI BUS SERVICE, reaches Venice in 40 minutes by highway. Since October 2024, an additional shuttle service operated by Flibco, in collaboration with Barzi Service, connects Treviso Airport directly with Mestre (railway station) and Venezia Tronchetto. The route offers up to 15 daily departures with schedules aligned to flight arrivals and departures. Tickets can be purchased online or via the Flibco mobile app. Further coach connections are available from the airport or from the city center of Treviso. Daily coach service operated by DRD to Ljubljana (Slovenia) via Venice Marco Polo Airport (Venice) and Friuli Venezia Giulia Airport (Trieste) A public bus vice versa service from Treviso to Padua, route 101, is operated by Mobilità di Marca.
