= Marcello Agnoletto =

Italian footballer

Personal information
- Date of birth: 2 January 1932 (age 94)
- Place of birth: Montebelluna, Italy
- Height: 1.72 m (5 ft 7 1/2 in)
- Position: Midfielder

Senior career*
| Years | Team | Apps | (Gls) |
| 1951–1952 | Montebelluna | 0 | (0) |
| 1952–1956 | Padova | 91 | (11) |
| 1956–1957 | Sampdoria | 25 | (1) |
| 1957–1960 | L.R. Vicenza | 64 | (4) |
| 1960–1961 | Padova | 7 | (0) |
| 1961–1962 | Modena | 7 | (1) |
| 1962–1963 | Treviso | 13 | (1) |
| 1963–1964 | Viareggio | 16 | (0) |
| 1964–1965 | Lucchese | 22 | (0) |

International career
| 1956 | Italy | 1 | (0) |
- * Club domestic league appearances and goals

Marcello Agnoletto (Italian pronunciation: [marˈtʃɛllo aɲɲoˈletto]; born 2 January 1932) is a retired professional Italian footballer who played as a midfielder.

== Club career ==
Agnoletto played for 6 seasons (118 games, 6 goals) in the Italian Serie A for Calcio Padova, U.C. Sampdoria and L.R. Vicenza.

== International career ==
Agnoletto played his only game for the Italy national football team on 11 November 1956, appearing in a match against Switzerland.
