= Istrana Air Base =

- IATA: none; ICAO: LIPS

Summary
- Airport type: Military
- Location: Istrana
- Elevation AMSL: 137 ft / 42 m
- Coordinates: 45°41′06″N 012°04′59″E

Map
- Location in Italy

Runways
Direction	Length		Surface
Direction	ft	m	Surface
08/26	9,816	2,992	Asphalt
- Sources: World Aero Data

Istrana Air Base (ICAO: LIPS) is a military airport located in Istrana, Veneto, Italy. It is home to the Italian Air Force's 51º Stormo.

== Overview ==
- 132º Gruppo FBA/RECCE (132nd Fighter Bomber Reconnaissance Squadron) operating AMX International AMX.
- 451º Gruppo STO (451st Technical Support Squadron)
- 551º Gruppo SLO (551st Logistic Support Squadron)
- 951º Gruppo Efficienza Aeromobili (951st Maintenance Squadron)

== See also ==
- List of airports in Italy
