= Angela Veronese =

Italian poet (1788–1847)

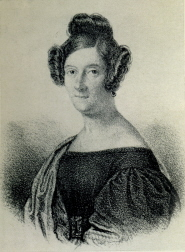
Angela Veronese

Angela Veronese (20 December 1778 - 8 October 1847) was an Italian poet.

== Biography ==
Angela Veronese was born in Montebelluna, 20 December 1778. Her parents were Pietro Rinaldo and Lucia.

When she was very young, she moved first to Treviso (in the villa of Ca 'Zenobio), and then to Venice where she contracted smallpox. In Venice, she was expelled from a female college. She remained in Venice under the auspices of the Zenobio counts, on whose behalf her family worked. In this period, she became fond of poetry, beginning to compose sonnets and other rhymes, which she collected under the name of Aglaia Anassillide (or Aglaja Anassillide), taken from the Arcadian tradition. Veronese is one of the significant writers in the history of early nineteenth-century Italian literature and is therefore registered in "Le Autrici della Letteratura Italiana" (The Authors of Italian Literature). She died in Padua, 8 October 1847.

== Selected works ==
- Rime pastorali di Aglaja Anassillide, Brescia, Niccolò Bettoni 1807
- Alcune poesie pastorali edite ed inedite di Aglaja Anassillide, Venezia, Picottiani 1819
- Versi di Aglaja Anassillide, aggiuntevi le notizie della sua vita scritte da lei medesima, Padova, Crescini 1826
- Poesie scelte d'italiani viventi, Venezia, Girolamo Tasso 1844
- Eurosia, Milano, Santo Bravetta 1836
- Notizie della sua vita scritte da lei medesima. Rime scelte, a cura di M. Pastore Stocchi, Firenze, Le Monnier 1973
