= Morgano =

- Comune
- Comune di Morgano
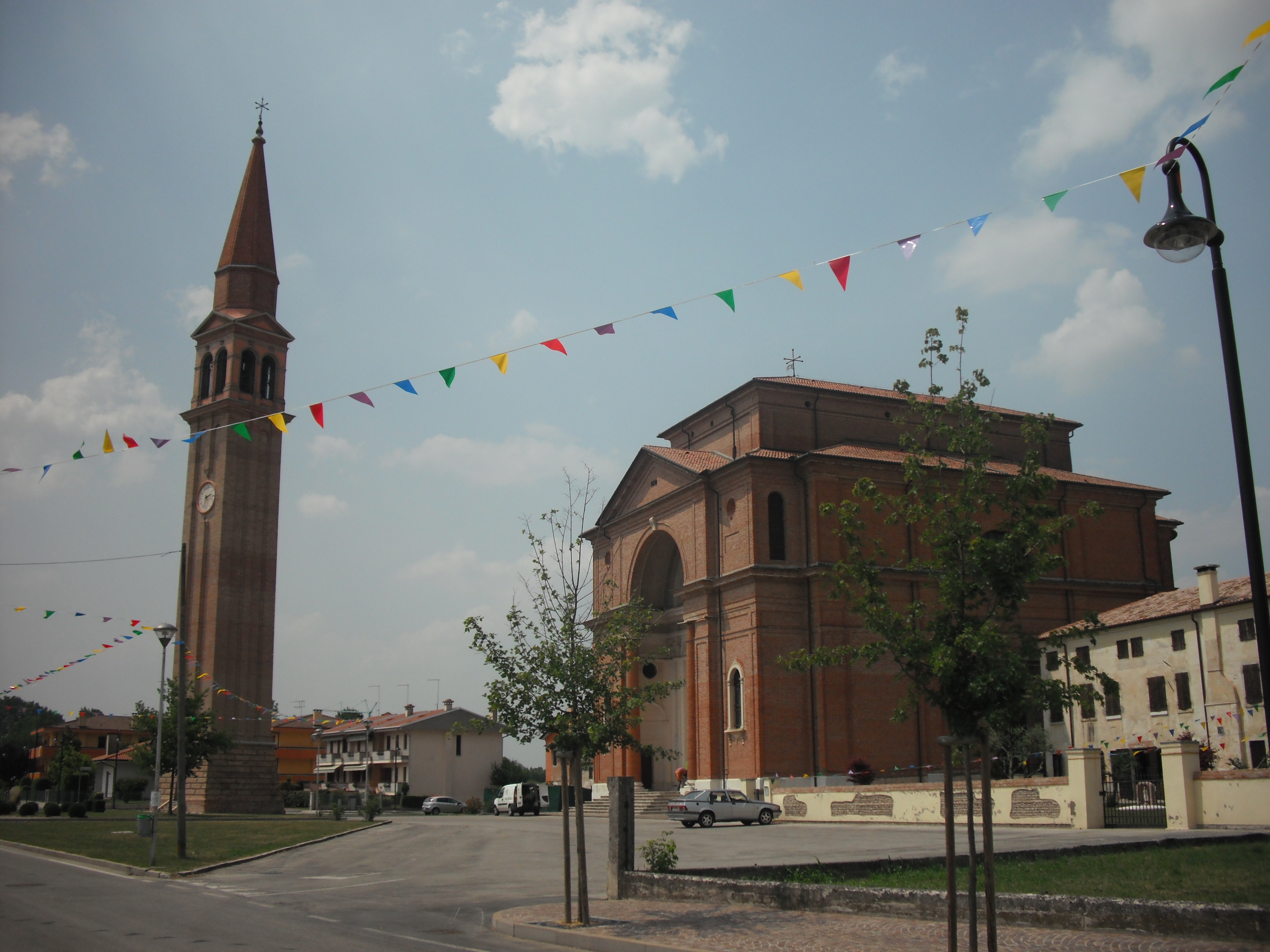
- Parish church

- Location within Italy Location within Veneto
- Coordinates: 45°39′N 12°6′E
- Country: Italy
- Region: Veneto
- Province: Treviso (TV)

Government
  - Mayor: Daniele Rostirolla

Area
  - Total: 11.7 km^{2} (4.5 sq mi)
- Elevation: 23 m (75 ft)

Population (31 December 2015)
  - Total: 4,487
  - Density: 384/km^{2} (993/sq mi)
- Demonym: Morganesi
- Time zone: UTC+1 (CET)
  - Summer (DST): UTC+2 (CEST)
- Postal code: 31050
- Dialing code: 0422
- Patron saint: St. Martin
- Saint day: 11 November
- Website: Official website

Morgano is a comune (municipality) in the Province of Treviso in the Italian region Veneto, located about 30 kilometres (19 mi) northwest of Venice and about 12 kilometres (7 mi) west of Treviso.

Morgano borders the following municipalities: Istrana, Paese, Piombino Dese, Quinto di Treviso, Zero Branco.
