= Istrana =

- Comune
- Comune di Istrana
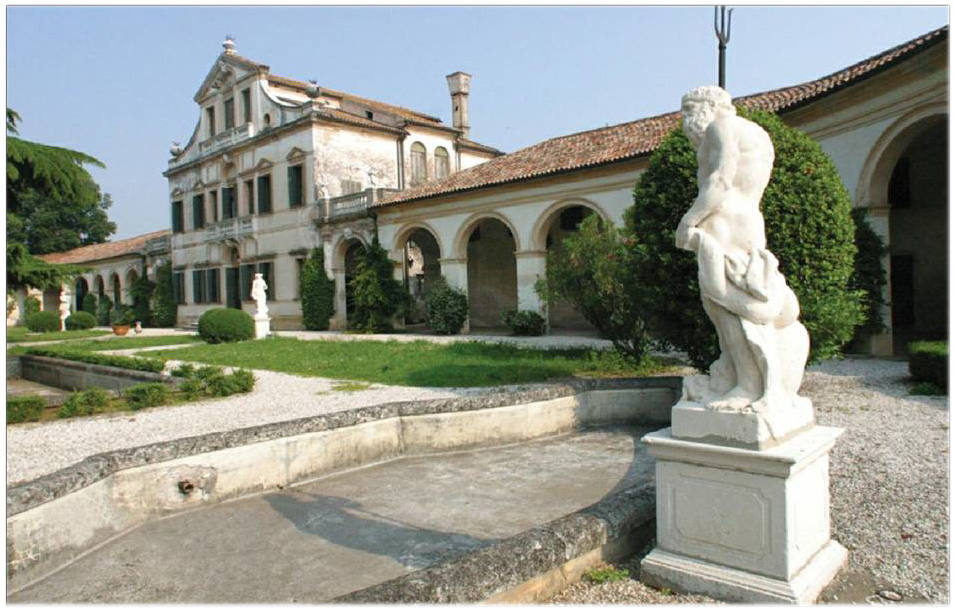
- Villa Lattes

- Location within Italy Location within Veneto
- Coordinates: 45°41′N 12°6′E
- Country: Italy
- Region: Veneto
- Province: Province of Treviso (TV)
- Frazioni: Sala, Pezzan, Ospedaletto, Villanova

Area
  - Total: 26.3 km^{2} (10.2 sq mi)
- Elevation: 38 m (125 ft)

Population (31 July 2025)
  - Total: 9,058
  - Density: 344/km^{2} (892/sq mi)
- Demonym: Istranesi
- Time zone: UTC+1 (CET)
  - Summer (DST): UTC+2 (CEST)
- Postal code: 31036
- Dialing code: 0422
- Website: Official website

Istrana is a comune (municipality) in the Province of Treviso in the Italian region Veneto, located about 35 kilometres (22 mi) northwest of Venice and about 12 kilometres (7 mi) west of Treviso. As of 31 July 2025, it had a population of 9,058 and an area of 26.3 square kilometres (10.2 mi^{2}).

The municipality of Istrana contains the frazioni (subdivisions, mainly villages and hamlets) Sala, Pezzan, Ospedaletto, Villanova, the Istrana Air Base.

Istrana borders the following municipalities: Morgano, Paese, Piombino Dese, Trevignano, Vedelago.

== History ==
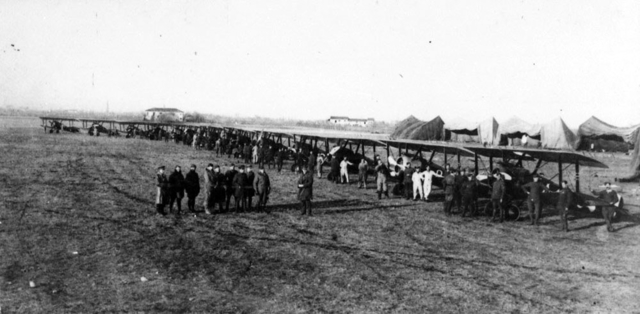
A group of Sopwith Camel aircraft of No. 45 Squadron, Royal Flying Corps, deployed at Istrana Airfield - December 1917

The oldest finds, which are very numerous, date back to the pre-Roman and Roman periods. One of the most obvious traces, by the way, is the Via Postumia, built in 147 BC by the consul Spurius Postumius Albinus Magnus and which still represents an important road artery that runs in a straight line north of Sala.

The first toponymic references, however, appear from the tenth century: Pezzan and Sala are mentioned in 996, Ospedaletto in 997, Villanova in 1014; Istrana, then, is also remembered even later (bull Justis fratrum of 1152) among the parish churches of the diocese of Treviso.

With the conquest of the Serenissima, the territory was at the center of the interests of the Venetian aristocracy who encouraged agriculture but also local art (some Venetian villas and the reconstructions of sacred buildings are worth mentioning).

During the First World War, Istrana was in the rear of the Piave front and housed an infirmary, while an airport linked to the hero Francesco Baracca was opened in Sala. Worthy of historical importance is the first air battle of the world aviation that took place over the skies of Istrana on December 26, 1917.

Even during World War II, it suffered bombing and reprisals due to its strategic location.

== Monuments and places of interest ==
- Archpriest's Church

The current archpriest church of Istrana, dedicated to St. John the Baptist, dates back to 1653, while the façade was erected in 1824 to a design by the architect Andrea Bon. With a single nave, it is decorated with elegant baroque stuccoes dating back to the 1700s. The splendid frescoes were painted around 1780 by the Venetian painter Francesco Zugno. The high altar is attributed to Giorgio Massari and preserves two canvases by the painter Amedeo Lorenzi, while an altarpiece of the Martyrdom of St. Sebastian, placed on a side altar, is attributed to Palma the Younger.

- Villa Lattes

Villa Lattes was built in 1715 to a design by Giorgio Massari, it has a two-storey façade with a central gable loggia, all enriched by elegant cornices and balustrades. On the sides, the two concave barchesse, with the one on the left ending with the noble chapel that contains paintings by Jacopo Amigoni. The villa is surrounded by an elegant English park. The interior still preserves evidence of the richness of centuries of history: antique furniture, collections and valuables still remain to characterize a real house-museum.

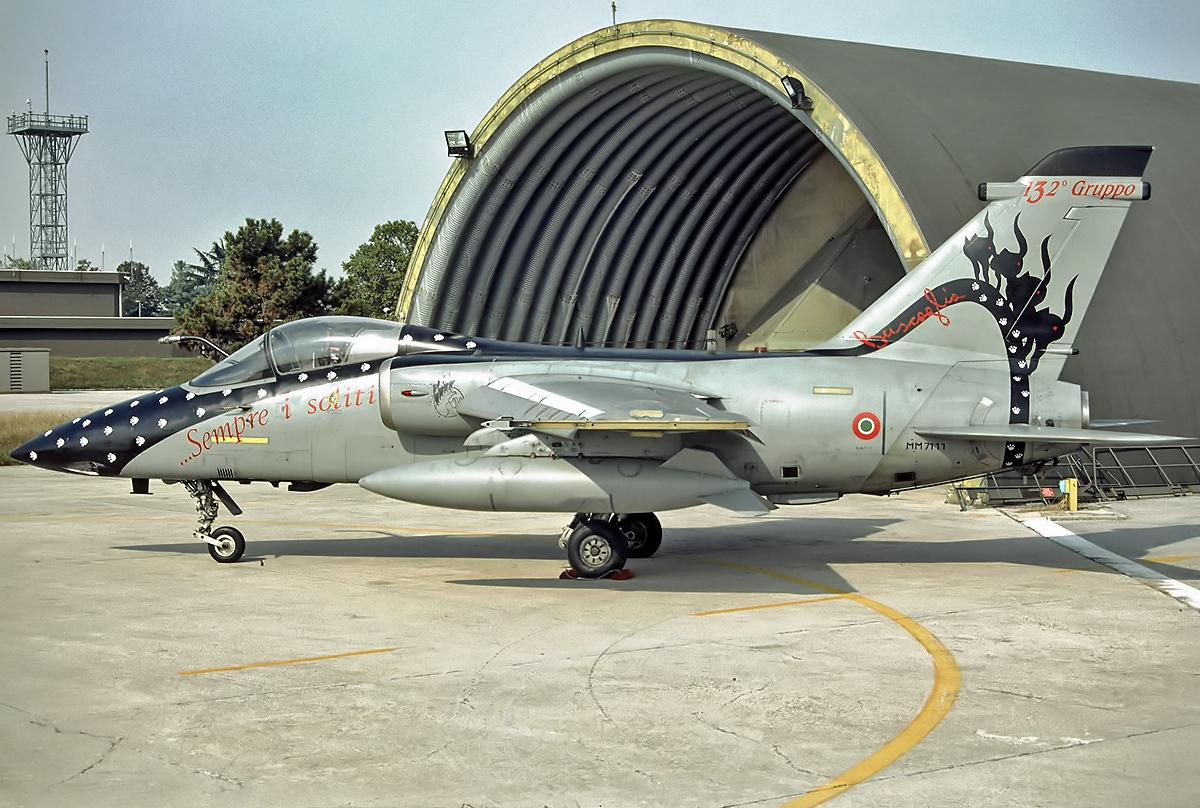
Alenia-Aermacchi-Embraer AMX Treviso-Istrana airport

- The airport

On 21 November 1981, the airport, where the Treviso Istrana weather station is located, hosted a race between Gilles Villeneuve, driving the Ferrari 126 CK, and Daniele Martinelli at the helm of an Aeritalia F-104S.

On the occasion of the Centenary of the Air Force at the Istrana base on March 28, 2023, the 51st Wing officially opened its doors to those wishing to visit the airport. The 51st Wing, equipped with AMX, AMX-T and F2000 aircraft, in addition to supporting surface forces and attack and reconnaissance operations, is one of the 5 Wings of the Italian Air Force that ensure national air defense and NATO Quick Reaction Alert service.

== Climate ==
Istrana has a humid subtropical climate (Köppen: Cfa), similar to the rest of northern Italy.

Climate data for Istrana (Istrana Air Base) (1991–2020)
Month	Jan	Feb	Mar	Apr	May	Jun	Jul	Aug	Sep	Oct	Nov	Dec	Year
Record high °C (°F)	16.0 (60.8)	22.6 (72.7)	25.2 (77.4)	32.0 (89.6)	34.8 (94.6)	37.4 (99.3)	39.4 (102.9)	39.9 (103.8)	34.4 (93.9)	29.2 (84.6)	23.3 (73.9)	16.4 (61.5)	39.9 (103.8)
Mean daily maximum °C (°F)	7.9 (46.2)	10.1 (50.2)	14.7 (58.5)	19.3 (66.7)	24.3 (75.7)	28.3 (82.9)	30.6 (87.1)	30.4 (86.7)	25.2 (77.4)	19.1 (66.4)	13.1 (55.6)	8.6 (47.5)	19.3 (66.7)
Daily mean °C (°F)	3.2 (37.8)	4.7 (40.5)	9.1 (48.4)	13.5 (56.3)	18.5 (65.3)	22.6 (72.7)	24.7 (76.5)	24.4 (75.9)	19.4 (66.9)	14.1 (57.4)	8.8 (47.8)	4.1 (39.4)	13.9 (57.0)
Mean daily minimum °C (°F)	−0.7 (30.7)	0.1 (32.2)	4.0 (39.2)	8.0 (46.4)	12.9 (55.2)	17.0 (62.6)	19.0 (66.2)	18.9 (66.0)	14.4 (57.9)	10.0 (50.0)	5.2 (41.4)	0.4 (32.7)	9.1 (48.4)
Record low °C (°F)	−10.0 (14.0)	−15.4 (4.3)	−8.4 (16.9)	−4.6 (23.7)	3.0 (37.4)	6.6 (43.9)	9.8 (49.6)	8.6 (47.5)	5.5 (41.9)	−1.4 (29.5)	−7.3 (18.9)	−13.0 (8.6)	−15.4 (4.3)
Average precipitation mm (inches)	45.12 (1.78)	56.04 (2.21)	60.69 (2.39)	85.92 (3.38)	107.49 (4.23)	85.39 (3.36)	73.71 (2.90)	75.88 (2.99)	95.19 (3.75)	93.72 (3.69)	100.33 (3.95)	64.04 (2.52)	943.52 (37.15)
Average precipitation days (≥ 1.0 mm)	5.20	5.13	5.80	8.67	9.43	8.50	7.07	6.53	7.30	7.23	8.31	6.23	85.40
Average relative humidity (%)	77.16	73.00	70.17	69.23	68.42	68.04	67.47	67.86	70.07	75.65	78.79	77.94	71.98
Average dew point °C (°F)	−0.09 (31.84)	0.31 (32.56)	3.68 (38.62)	7.72 (45.90)	12.20 (53.96)	16.07 (60.93)	17.83 (64.09)	17.80 (64.04)	14.04 (57.27)	10.34 (50.61)	5.69 (42.24)	1.03 (33.85)	8.88 (47.98)
Source: NOAA

== Demographic evolution ==
Historical population

Year	Pop.	±%
1861	?	—
1871	2,870	—
1881	3,202	+11.6%
1901	3,665	+14.5%
1911	4,352	+18.7%
1921	4,955	+13.9%

Year	Pop.	±%
1931	5,033	+1.6%
1936	5,036	+0.1%
1951	5,346	+6.2%
1961	5,373	+0.5%
1971	5,701	+6.1%
1981	6,315	+10.8%

Year	Pop.	±%
1991	6,916	+9.5%
2001	7,754	+12.1%
2011	9,036	+16.5%
2021	9,088	+0.6%

Source: Data from ISTAT

=== Foreign ethnicities and minorities ===
As of December 31, 2024 foreigners residents in the municipality were 765, i.e. 8.1% of the population. The largest groups are shown below:

1. Kosovo 158
2. China 117
3. Romania 110
4. North Macedonia 44
5. Albania 37
6. Morocco 35
7. Senegal 23
8. Colombia 23

== Twin towns ==
Istrana is twinned with:

- Grenade, Haute-Garonne, France, since 1989
- Lapa, Paraná, Brazil, since 2002
