= Quinto di Treviso =

- Comune
- Comune di Quinto di Treviso
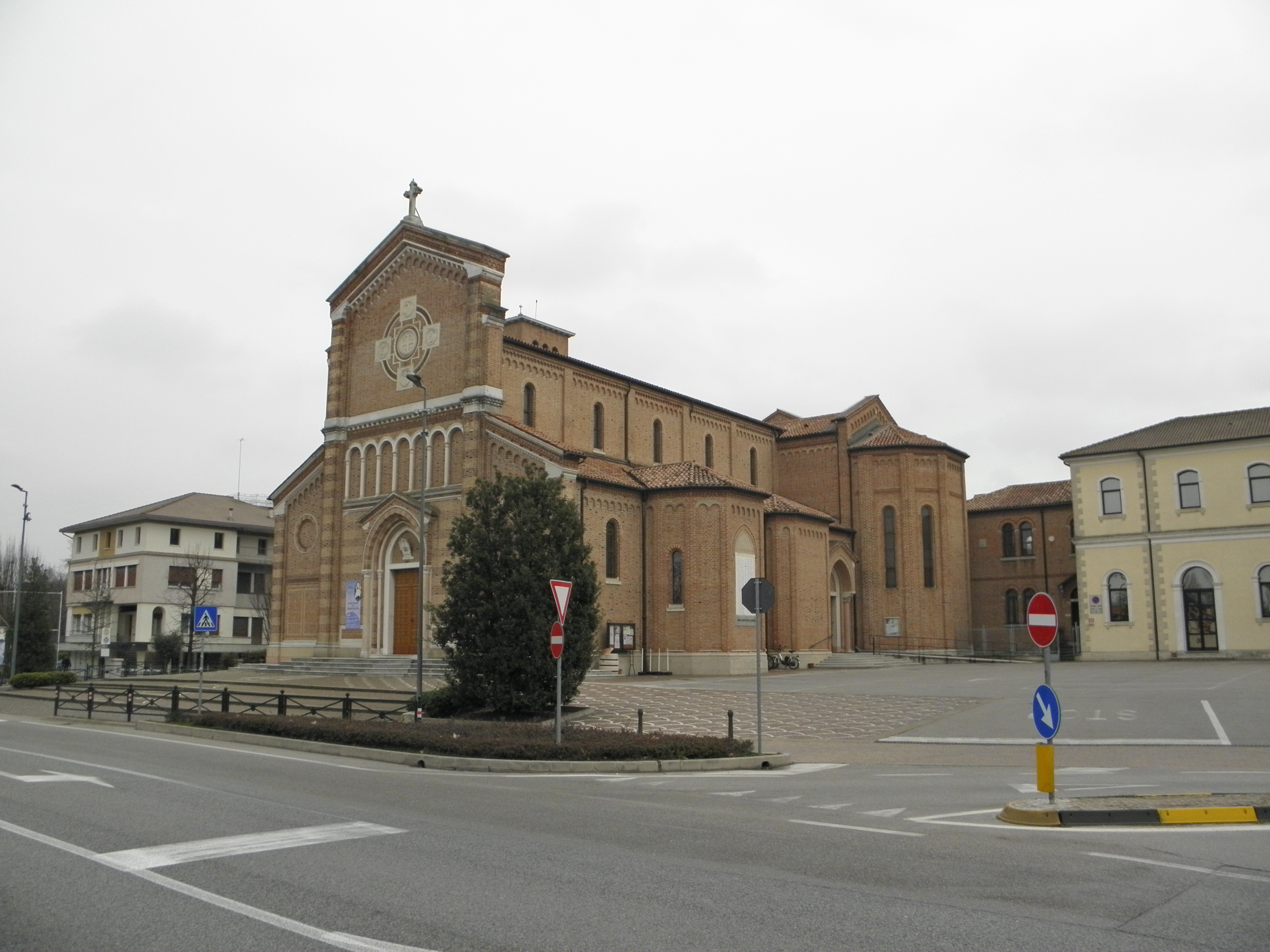
- Church of St. George

- Coat of arms

- The municipal territory in the province of Treviso

- Location within Italy Location within Veneto
- Coordinates: 45°39′N 12°10′E
- Country: Italy
- Region: Veneto
- Province: Treviso (TV)
- Frazioni: Santa Cristina

Government
  - Mayor: Ivano Durigon (Lega-Forza Italia - EPP-Progetto Quinto)

Area
  - Total: 19.0 km^{2} (7.3 sq mi)
- Elevation: 17 m (56 ft)

Population (30 June 2025)
  - Total: 10,093
  - Density: 531/km^{2} (1,380/sq mi)
- Demonym: Quintini
- Time zone: UTC+1 (CET)
  - Summer (DST): UTC+2 (CEST)
- Postal code: 31055
- Dialing code: 0422
- Patron saint: St. George and St. Valentine
- Saint day: 14 February
- Website: Official website

Quinto di Treviso is a comune (municipality) in the Province of Treviso in the Italian region Veneto, located about 25 kilometres (16 mi) northwest of Venice and about 7 kilometres (4 mi) southwest of Treviso.

In the church of Santa Cristina, a hamlet of Quinto, there is a Lorenzo Lotto's painting, the Santa Cristina al Tiverone Altarpiece.

Quinto di Treviso borders the following municipalities: Morgano, Paese, Treviso, Zero Branco.

== History ==
Numerous finds, most of which are now housed in the Treviso Civic Museums, testify to the fact that human presence had been established in the area since at least the Bronze Age.

Even during the Roman period, civilization flourished, given its proximity to the municipium of Treviso. The toponym itself indicates its ancient origins: it indicated a mansio, or way station, located five miles from the city, probably along the road leading to Padua through Levada, Loreggia, and the Via Aurelia (note that the locality of Settimo is located in the municipality of Morgano).)

Quinto remained tied to Treviso even in later eras. A document from 992 records that the bishops owned some property in the area, and perhaps even a fortress; shortly thereafter, the nearby towns are mentioned in the foundation deed of the Mogliano Abbey, to which they were assigned. However, it was not until 1152 that the toponym Quinto was first mentioned: on May 3 of that year, a papal bull issued by Pope Eugene III confirmed the dependence of the local parish of San Cassiano on the diocese of Treviso. It was also the seat of one of the four archpriestates of the diocese, to which several other parishes, from Istrana to San Biagio di Callalta, were subject.

The parish church remained isolated and lost importance when the town's vital center moved further south, along the banks of the Sile. For centuries, the town's economy was based on this river, primarily through milling. In the 14th century, the old parish church was replaced by a new church dedicated to San Giorgio, built near the town center.

The Venetian Republic further strengthened Quinto's agricultural economy, and numerous landowners settled here, building their villas.

From 1941 to 1947, Quinto di Treviso was crossed by the Treviso-Ostiglia railway and equipped with its own station.

== Monuments and Places of Interest ==
- Parish Church of San Giorgio Martire

The current parish church, dedicated to San Giorgio Martire, was almost completely rebuilt after World War II based on a design by Antonio Beni. The old building, originally from the 14th century, contains two 15th-century frescoes and two paintings by Pozzoserrato; the latter were part of a triptych that was completed with a work now preserved in the chapel of Villa Giordani-Valeri.

- Church of San Cassiano

The church of San Cassiano Martire, near the cemetery, was the ancient parish church of Quinto. Of very ancient origins, it preserves several valuable works: the wooden altar, with a polyptych by a 16th-century Venetian master; the ceiling is by Jacopo Guarana (1758), and also noteworthy are the canvases by Lattanzio Querena and Ascanio Spineda. Also noteworthy are the Istrian stone baptismal font (dated 1317) and the 19th-century "phonochromic" organ by Giovan Battista De Lorenzi. The bell tower, which dates back to the Middle Ages, houses three bells.

- Church of Santa Cristina

It was formerly a chapel dependent on the parish church of San Cassiano di Quinto. The church was rebuilt in the 17th century and renovated in the 18th century.

The current building, however, is even more recent: it was completely rebuilt in Neo-Romanesque style around 1930, with its characteristic bell tower, unusually placed above the entrance portal. It was consecrated in 1933 by Archbishop Andrea Giacinto Longhin, Bishop of Treviso and Titular Archbishop of Patras.

== Venetian Villas ==
The most valuable example of a Venetian villa in the area was Palazzo Lollin, frescoed by Pozzoserrato, which was destroyed in the 19th century. Villa Giordani and Villa Ciardi were almost completely rebuilt in the last century. Some Venetian villas were made available to the village's poor families immediately after the war. Among these was Villa Borghesan, where the future bass player of the Italian rock band Pooh, Red Canzian was born. The villa was demolished after a small tornado in the mid-1950s. Almost all the aviators of the 91st Squadron (the Aces Squadron) lived in this villa, including Francesco Baracca, who lived there until his death.

== Natural areas ==
In the municipal territory there are Cervara Oasis. It represents one of the gateways to the Sile Natural Park forms a very important marshland in hamlet of Santa Cristina. It extends over a 25-hectare island bordered to the north by the Sile and to the south by the Piovega. The ecosystem is based on the dense presence of springs, creating an environment rich in flora and fauna.

The area is also historically and culturally significant: within it stands the Cervara Mill, active since at least 1325, along with a farmhouse and a fishpond, historical reconstructions illustrating the traditional human activities of the area.

The Treviso-Ostiglia cycle path crosses numerous points of historical, cultural, landscape and naturalistic interest in the area.

== Demographic evolution ==
Historical population

Year	Pop.	±%
1861	?	—
1871	2,702	—
1881	3,003	+11.1%
1901	3,197	+6.5%
1911	3,909	+22.3%
1921	4,654	+19.1%

Year	Pop.	±%
1931	4,540	−2.4%
1936	4,613	+1.6%
1951	5,308	+15.1%
1961	5,333	+0.5%
1971	5,996	+12.4%
1981	8,498	+41.7%

Year	Pop.	±%
1991	9,054	+6.5%
2001	9,288	+2.6%
2011	9,745	+4.9%
2021	9,945	+2.1%

Source: Data from ISTAT

=== Foreign ethnicities and minorities ===
As of December 31, 2024 foreigners residents in the municipality were 1,168, i.e. 11.6% of the population. The largest foreign community comes from Romania with 17.7% of all foreigners present in the country, followed by Kosovo and Albania.

== Infrastructure and transport ==
The municipality od Quinto is served by two MOM (Mobilità di Marca) urban bus lines.

- Line 6 terminates at the church, the San Cassiano neighborhood, and Via Ciardi, and connects the city with Treviso Airport, the Miani Park parking lot, the train station, and the historic center of Treviso, passing through Via Noalese. Some services, during peak hours, are extended to San Cassiano.
- Line 55 (from the merger of Lines 5 and 51, formerly ACTT) connects Quinto, from Via Zecchina, and Merlengo, in the municipality of Ponzano, passing through the train station and the historic center of Treviso, and passing through Canizzano and Sant'Angelo di Treviso. During the day, the line is occasionally extended to Santa Cristina di Quinto di Treviso or via Talponera di Merlengo, as well as stopping at San Vitale di Canizzano di Treviso.

The MOM suburban lines 101, 102, and 103 also stop in the center of Quinto, connecting with Treviso, Padua, Scorzè, Noale, Zero Branco, Badoere, Scandolara, Trebaseleghe, and Piombino Dese.

== Notable people ==
- Fausto Pajar, journalist and writer (1948-2024)
- Gianpaolo Dozzo, politician (1954-2024)
- Red Canzian, songwriter, lead vocalist and bassist (born 1951)
- Pierpaolo Capovilla, opera singer in the Teatro degli Orrori (album) (born 1968)
