= Trevignano =

Trevignano Trevignan
- Comune
- Comune di Trevignano
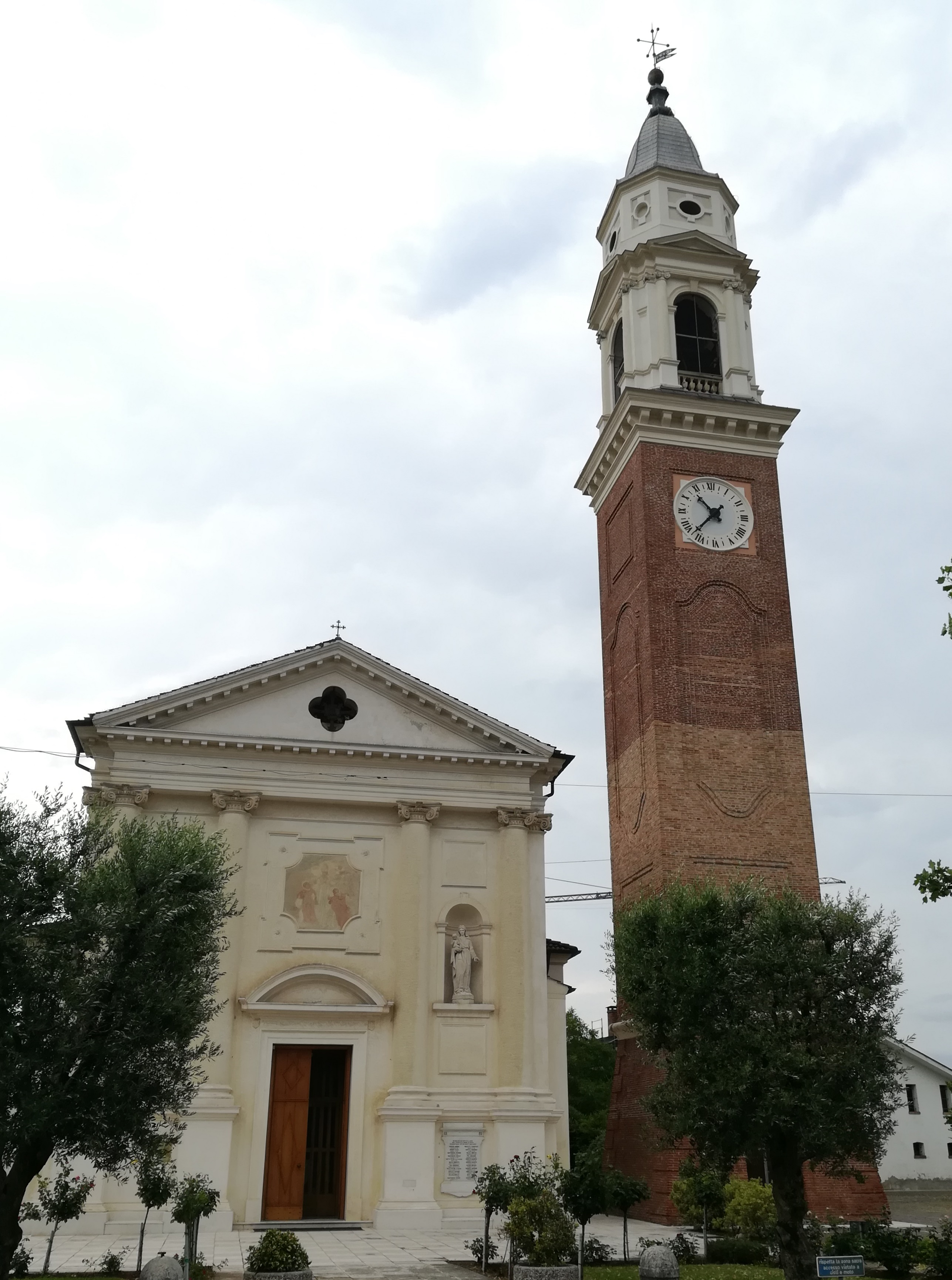
- Parish church

- Trevignano within the Province of Treviso

- Location within Italy Location within Veneto
- Coordinates: 45°44′N 12°4′E
- Country: Italy
- Region: Veneto
- Province: Treviso (TV)
- Frazioni: Falzé (municipal seat), Musano, Signoressa, Trevignano

Government
  - Mayor: Franco Bonesso (lista civica trasversale Per Trevignano)

Area
  - Total: 26.55 km^{2} (10.25 sq mi)
- Elevation: 85 m (279 ft)

Population (31-12-2025)
  - Total: 10,676
  - Density: 402.1/km^{2} (1,041/sq mi)
- Demonym: Trevignanesi
- Time zone: UTC+1 (CET)
  - Summer (DST): UTC+2 (CEST)
- Postal code: 31040
- Dialing code: 0423
- ISTAT code: 026085
- Patron saint: San Valentino and Santa Maria del Carmelo
- Saint day: 14 February
- Website: Official website

Trevignano is a town and comune in the province of Treviso, Veneto, Italy. It is a scattered municipality as the municipal seat is not located in the locality of the same name but in nearby Falzè.

== Origins of the name ==
The toponym is a predial from the personal Trebinius to which the suffix -ānus has been added.'

== Monuments and places of interest ==
=== Religious architecture ===
Parish Church of San Teonisto e Compagni Martiri

=== Civil architectures ===
==== Venetian villas ====
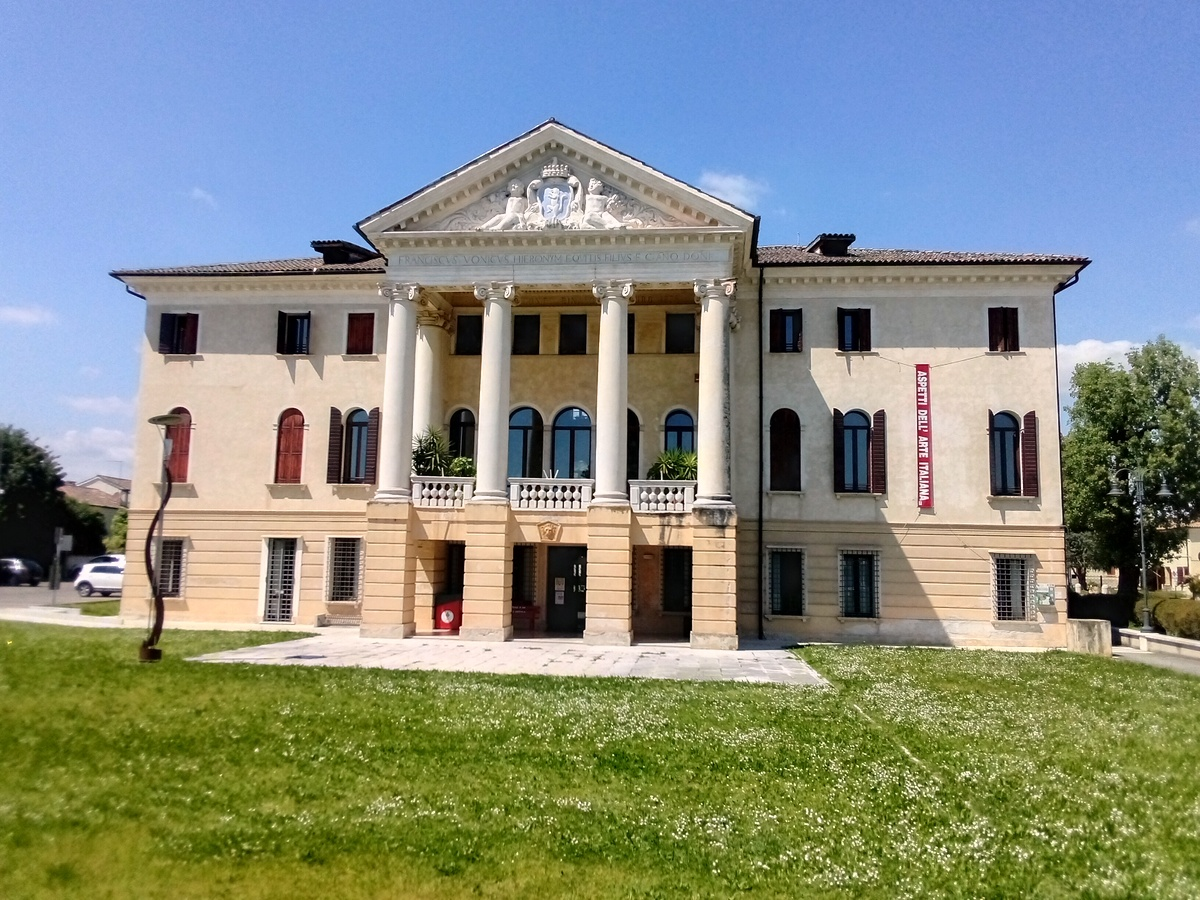
Villa Onigo

- Villa Bruna
- Villa Cadò
- Villa Coletti
- Villa Favaretto
- Villa Manin
- Villa Onigo, Farra
- Villa Onigo Pasinetti Favotto
- Villa Onigo Rinaldi Ninni
- Villa Palladini Coletti Pumini
- Villa Pasqualetti Oniga
- Casa Pizzolato

== Geography ==
The municipality borders with Istrana, Montebelluna, Paese, Vedelago and Volpago del Montello.

The commune contains the town of Trevignano and the hamlets of Signoressa, Musano and Falzé (listed in order of population size).

Two provincial roads cross the entire municipal territory in an east-west direction (SP 69 Schiavonesca) and north-south (SP 100 of Montebelluna).

The statute recognizes 4 geographical fractions:

- Trevignano is located on the SP 69, in the western part of the municipal area;
- Falzè (town hall) is located at the crossroads of the aforementioned road with the SP 100;
- Signoressa is contiguous to Falzè, always on the SP 69 in an easterly direction;
- Musano is instead to the south, along the SP 100.

== Demographic evolution ==
Historical population

Year	Pop.	±%
1861	?	—
1871	3,206	—
1881	3,525	+10.0%
1901	4,081	+15.8%
1911	5,181	+27.0%
1921	5,456	+5.3%
1931	5,418	−0.7%
1936	5,404	−0.3%

Year	Pop.	±%
1951	5,928	+9.7%
1961	5,438	−8.3%
1971	5,912	+8.7%
1981	7,420	+25.5%
1991	8,254	+11.2%
2001	9,074	+9.9%
2011	10,565	+16.4%
2021	10,701	+1.3%

Source: Data from ISTAT

=== Foreign ethnicities and minorities ===
As of December 31, 2025, foreigners residents in the municipality were 898, i.e., 8.3% of the population. The largest groups are shown below:

1. China 222
2. Morocco 109
3. Romania 108
4. Kosovo 103
5. Albania 62
6. Ghana 48

== Economy ==
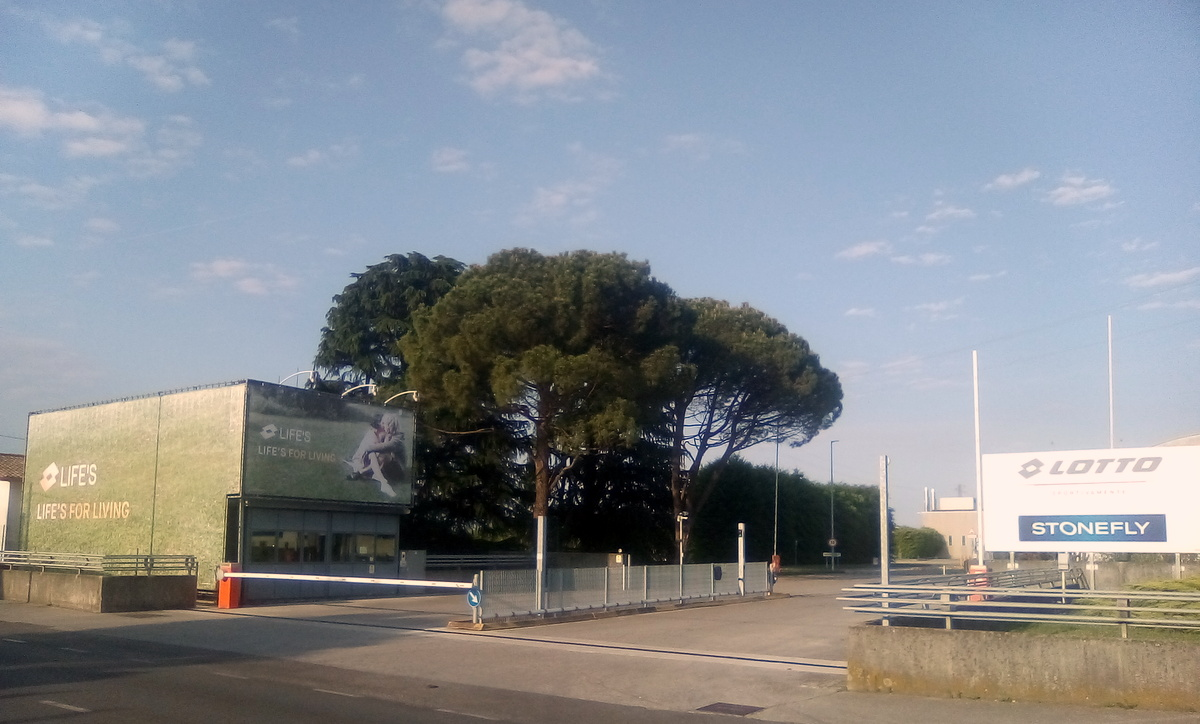
Production plant Lottosport and Stonefly

Agriculture continues to be practiced successfully thanks to the favorable characteristics of the land: cereals, wheat, vegetables, fodder, vines and orchards are grown. Breeding is also practiced, especially of cattle, pigs, sheep and poultry. The industrial fabric is mainly made up of shoe factories, for example the well-known Lotto and Stonefly. There are also establishments for processing and preserving fruit and vegetables, dairy farms, feed mills and various construction companies. The tertiary sector is made up of the distribution network (supermarkets) and the set of services, including that of a large banking group in the historic centre.
