= Montebelluna =

City in Veneto, Italy

- Comune
- Città di Montebelluna
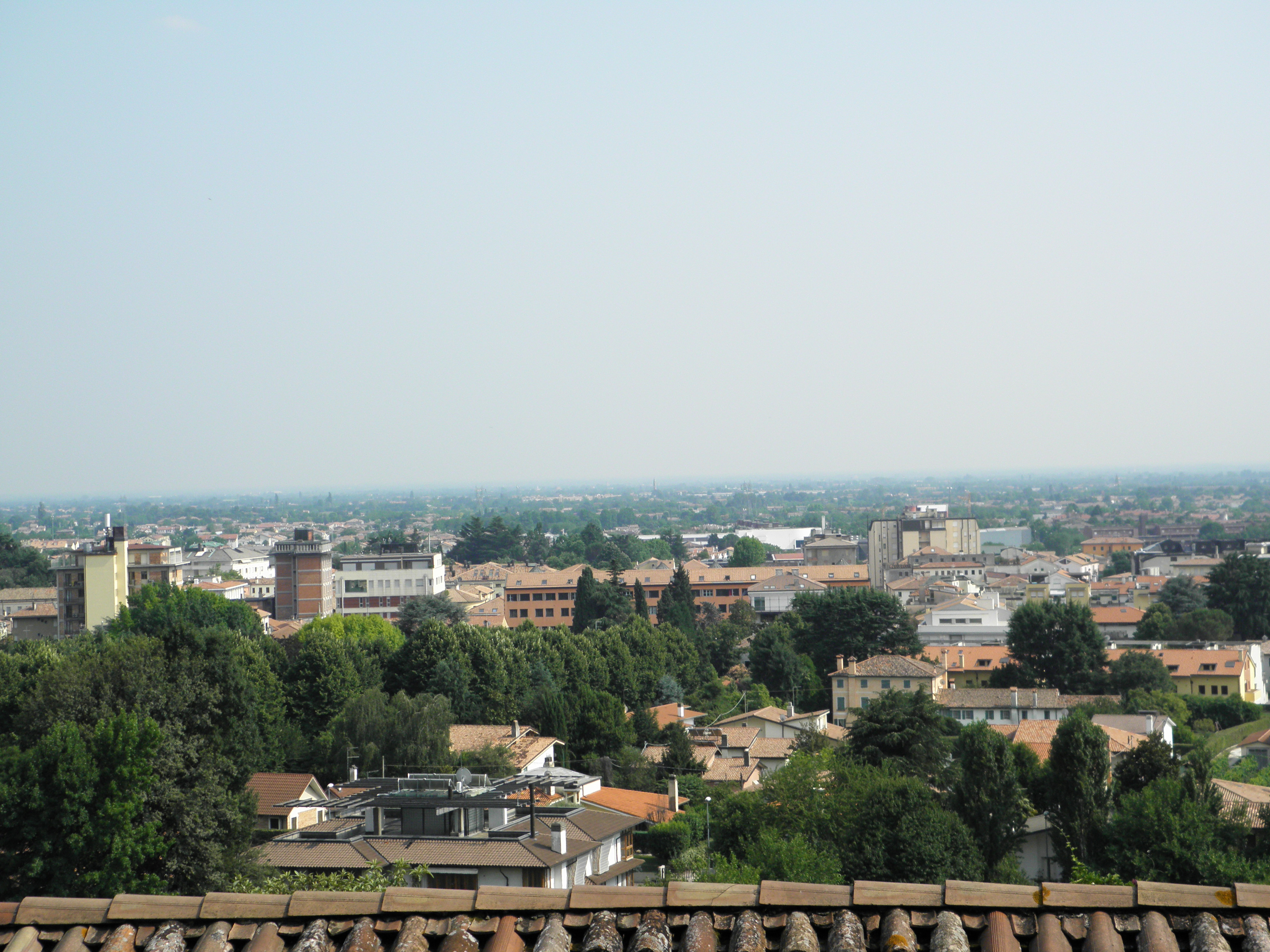
- View from the church of Santa Maria in Colle

- Coat of arms

- Location within Italy Location within Veneto
- Coordinates: 45°46′31″N 12°02′20″E
- Country: Italy
- Region: Veneto
- Province: Treviso (TV)
- Frazioni: Busta, Biadene, San Gaetano, Sant'Andrea, Mercato Vecchio, Caonada, Contea, Posmon, La Pieve, Guarda, Pederiva

Government
  - Mayor: Adalberto Bordin (LN)

Area
  - Total: 48.98 km^{2} (18.91 sq mi)
- Elevation: 109 m (358 ft)

Population (December 31, 2025)
  - Total: 31,144
  - Density: 635.9/km^{2} (1,647/sq mi)
- Demonym: Montebellunesi
- Time zone: UTC+1 (CET)
  - Summer (DST): UTC+2 (CEST)
- Postal code: 31044
- Dialing code: 0423
- Patron saint: B.V.M. Immacolata
- Saint day: December 8
- Website: Official website

Montebelluna is a city and comune in Veneto, Italy, approximately 50 kilometres (31 mi) northwest of Venice. It has an estimated population of 31,000.

Montebelluna borders the following municipalities: Altivole, Caerano di San Marco, Cornuda, Crocetta del Montello, Trevignano, Vedelago, Volpago del Montello.

== Physical geography ==
=== Territory ===
The territory of Montebelluna is largely flat, with altitudes ranging from 69 m a.s.l., found south of San Gaetano, to 144 m, north of Pederiva. The landscape is also characterized by the presence of two hills, including the western end of Montello (where the maximum altitude is, 343 m) and the more modest Capo di Monte (or Montebelluna Alta, or even the hill of Mercato Vecchio, 199 m). Between the two reliefs passes a natural corridor (along which the Feltrina passes), once the original bed of the Piave.

The area is naturally poor in waterways but the water supply has been ensured, since ancient times, by a system of artificial canals deriving from the Piave. These are in particular the Canale del Bosco and the Canale di Caerano, branches of the Brentella di Pederobba.

=== Climate ===
The climate has hot and sultry summers due to high humidity levels, often with strong thunderstorms and the possibility of hail. The 1961-1990 reference average temperatures vary between a minimum of about 0 °C in January–February and a maximum of 29 °C in July–August. The average temperature of the coldest month, January, is 3.1 °C, and that of the hottest month, July, is 23.0 °C. Occasional slight snowfalls may occur.

== Origins of the name ==
The toponym is clearly a compound. Monte- would indicate the hill of Mercato Vecchio, at the foot of which the town was built. The origin of -belluna is more discussed: it could be in relation to the cult of the goddess Bellona; or, postponing its origin, it would refer to the city of Belluno which, in the 10th century, had expanded its jurisdiction beyond the Piave thanks to the conquests of Bishop Giovanni. The first evidence of the toponym is in the year 1000 << de Musano usque in capite montis Belluni >>, in 1239 << Montis Bellunensis Castrum >>, in 1245 << Castrum Montisbellune >> and in 1251 <<Montebelluna>>.

== Ancient history ==
Protohistoric and Roman age The first traces of human activity date back to the Stone and Bronze Ages (Middle Paleolithic). The birth of a real settlement, however, occurs around the ninth century BC. Its development was favored by the strategic geographical position at the mouth of the Piave valley, connection between the plain and the pre-Alpine area. Over time it will become the most important center of pre-Roman Veneto. This information is given to us by the numerous findings of cemetery areas in the localities of Santa Maria in Colle and Posmon.

The area continues to be inhabited during the Roman period (from the Romanization of the Veneto between the 2nd-1st century BC until the 2nd century AD). Montebelluna will become part of the centuriation of the Roman municipality Acelum (Asolo). It is not yet ascertained as a hypothesis, much less that Montebelluna was a residential center (near Santa Maria in Colle) or a Roman castra in defense of the Asolo and Treviso fences.

== Monuments and places of interest ==
=== Religious architecture ===
- Cathedral of the Immaculate Conception: the collegiate church is dedicated to the Immaculate Conception and more commonly known simply as Montebelluna Cathedral. It is the town’s principal religious building and the seat of the vicariate of the same name within the Diocese of Treviso.

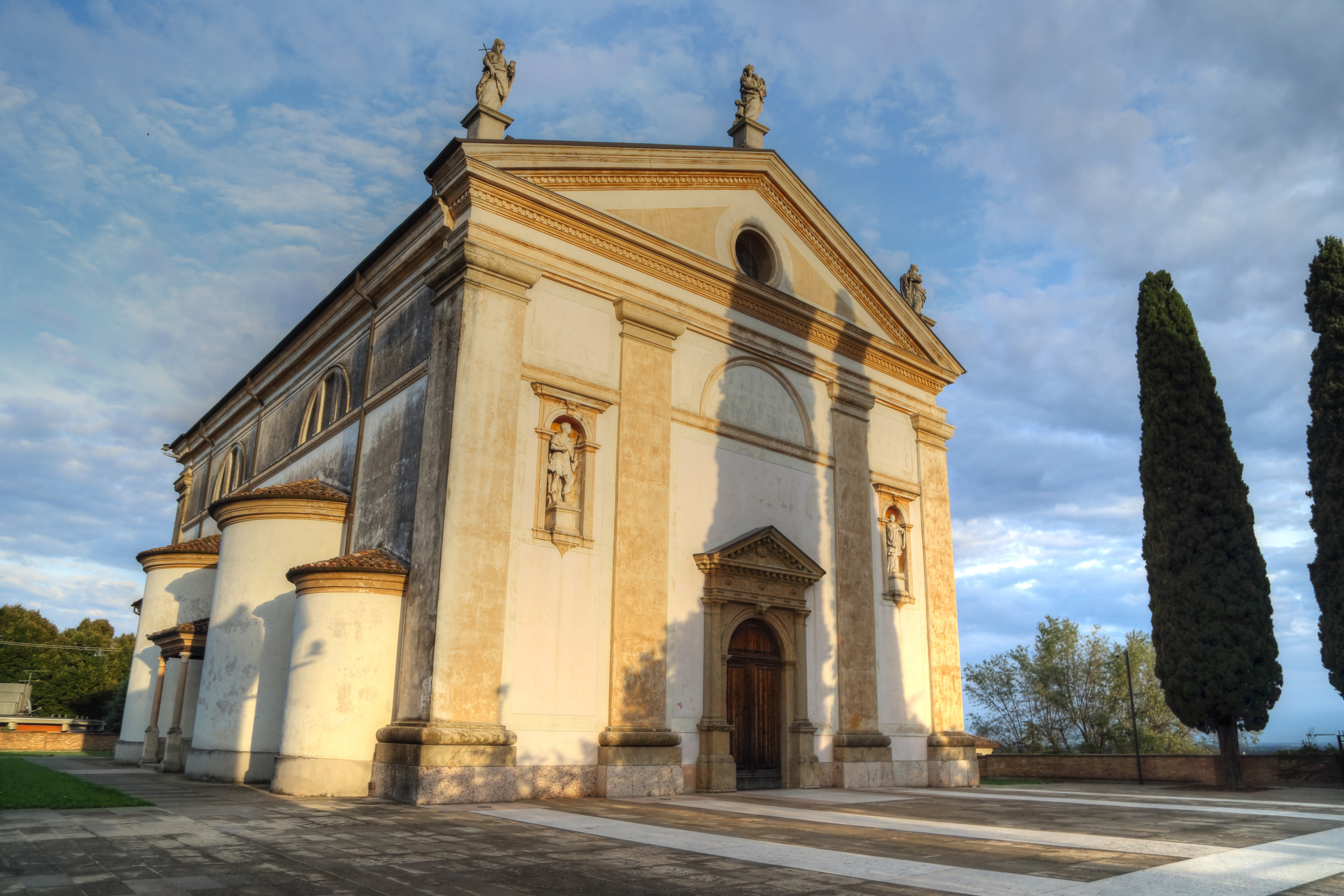
Church of Santa Maria in Colle

- Church of Santa Maria in Colle: an ancient provost church, rebuilt in 1609 and completed in the mid-18th century by Giorgio Massari. It is now devoid of the Baroque altars that were moved to the new cathedral, but retains the great ceiling painting *La Gloria del Paradiso* by Francesco Fontebasso, several 17th-century altars, a late 17th-century wooden choir by Francesco Comin and Paolo Della Mistra, and the double organ designed by Gaetano Callido.
- Church of Saints Lucy and Victor: an 18th-century building in Biadene, constructed by the Pisani family and donated to the community. Inside, there is the first fresco by the painter Gian Battista Tiepolo (dated between approximately 1716 and 1719), depicting the Coronation of the Virgin and the Glory of Saints Lucy and Victor.
- Church of San Biagio in the hamlet of Mercato Vecchio.

=== Civil Architecture ===
- Town Hall – An extension to an old rural building dating from the mid-19th century, designed by Giuseppe Legrenzi senior.
- Loggia dei Grani – An architectural masterpiece by Giobatta Dall'Armi and the focal point of the system of squares designed to accommodate the relocation of the old market.
- Townhouses. These comprise a series of 19th-century buildings of noble and dignified construction, built in the years immediately following the establishment of the new town centre (1872). Notable examples include Palazzo Bolzon, Morassutti, Sarri Dall'Armi and Polin.
- Municipal Library – A large building with exposed brickwork, designed by architect Toni Follina to house the new Montebelluna Municipal Library since 2002.

=== Venetian Villas ===
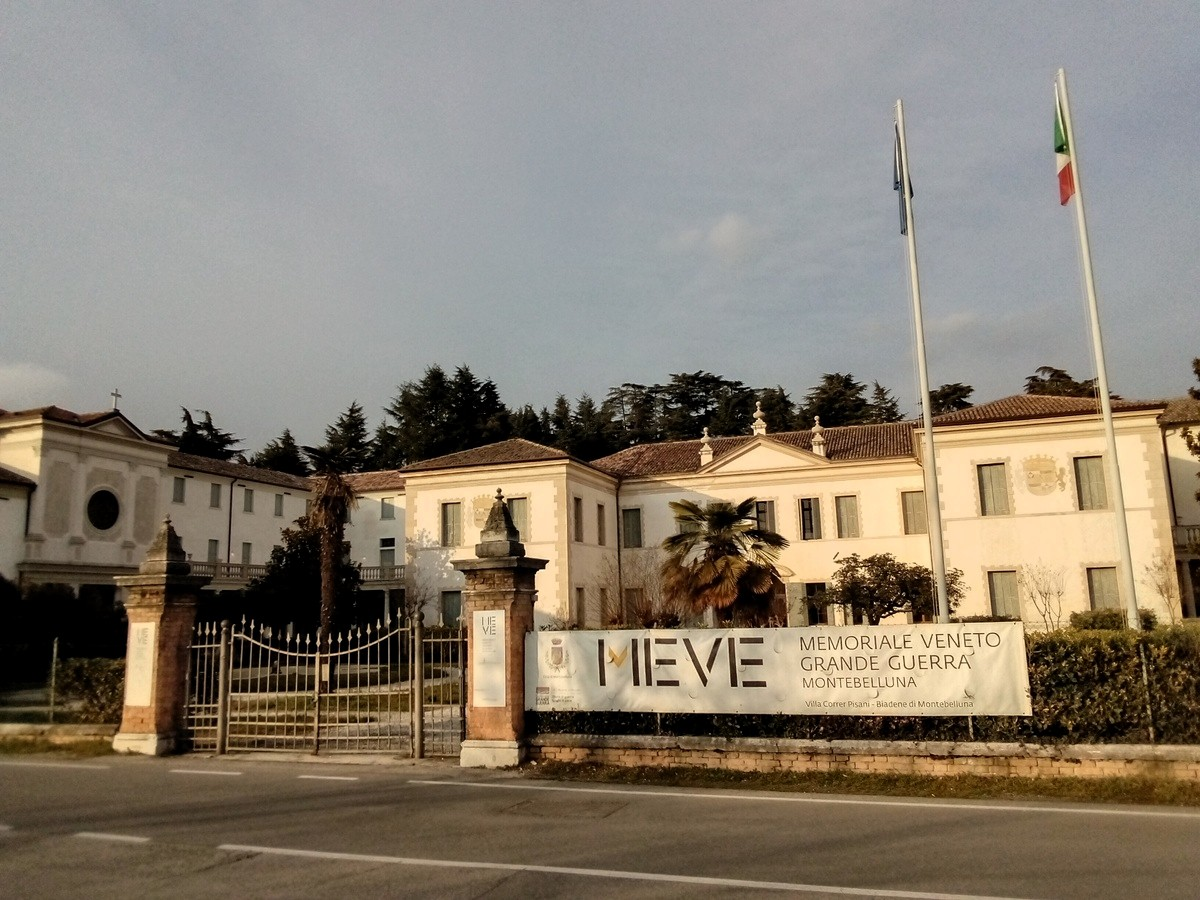
Villa Correr Pisani

In Posmon (including the ancient hamlet of Visnà), the 15th-century residential settlement, favoured by the course of the Brentella river, gave rise to a proliferation of stately homes, starting with the ancient estates of the Pola family (featuring the 15th-century ‘barco dei paladini’), the Contarini family (with the highly significant views of St Mark’s and Piazza dei Signori in Treviso from the early 16th century), and the Cicogna family. In the Montello area too, as throughout the province of Treviso, there are Venetian villas; in terms of size and urban and architectural quality, Villa Mora Morassutti, Villa Giustinian Rinaldi and Villa Burchielati Zuccareda Binetti are particularly noteworthy.

Villa Correr Pisani, located in the hamlet of Biadene, is home to the MeVe (Veneto Memorial of the Great War), an interactive and multimedia space dedicated to the conflicts and events that have shaped the last century of our history, beginning with the First World War.

== Society ==
=== Demographic evolution ===
Historical population

Year	Pop.	±%
1861	?	—
1871	8,091	—
1881	9,008	+11.3%
1901	10,284	+14.2%
1911	12,364	+20.2%
1921	15,016	+21.4%

Year	Pop.	±%
1931	15,149	+0.9%
1936	15,064	−0.6%
1951	16,977	+12.7%
1961	18,909	+11.4%
1971	22,313	+18.0%
1981	24,585	+10.2%

Year	Pop.	±%
1991	25,186	+2.4%
2001	27,539	+9.3%
2011	30,765	+11.7%
2021	31,062	+1.0%

Source: Data from ISTAT

=== Foreign ethnicities and minorities ===
As of 31 December, 2025 foreigners residents in the municipality were 3,667, i.e. 11.8% of the population. The largest groups are shown below:

1. China 1,130
2. Romania 570
3. Morocco 349
4. Albania 344
5. Ukraine 237
6. Kosovo 150
7. North Macedonia 137
8. Nigeria 107
9. Moldova 76
10. Dominican Republic 64

== Economy ==
Montebelluna is one of the largest industrial center in synergy with the nearby province of Vicenza. The industries are specialized above all in the tanning, metalworking, electrotechnical, optical, food, footwear, clothing (especially sports), precision instruments, plastics and graphic arts sectors. The agricultural sector is active in the production of vegetables, fruit, wine grapes, cereals, fodder and in the practice of cattle breeding. Trade and logistics developed, favored by the strategic position of the town, a road junction at the center of an important production area. It is a major producer of ski boots.

In 1989, Montebelluna manufactured over 70% of the global output. Outside magazine has characterized it as "The world's leading design center for outdoor footwear." More than a dozen boot and sport shoe brands, including Alpina Žiri, Asolo, Fila, La Sportiva, Lowa, Mammut Sports Group, Scarpa, and Tecnica Group, do at least some of their work in the city. A museum of bootmaking, the Museo dello Scarpone e della Calzatura Sportiva, is housed in the Villa Zuccareda Binetti.

2022 marks the date for Montebelluna when exactly 150 years ago was transferred the old market from the Colle to the plain took place, an event that also led to the birth of the city as we know it today. To celebrate this anniversary, the municipal administration of Montebelluna with the input from the Promoting Committee and assisted by the Steering Committee and the Operational Committee, has prepared a calendar that consists of initiatives, manifestations and events of various kinds that will last all year round. with the involvement of many local associations as well as the civil community.

To create the logo and the payoff, the students of the Technologies and techniques of graphic representation of the Einaudi Scarpa Institute in Montebelluna were involved and took part in an ideas competition to create the logo and the payoff. The various proposals formulated were evaluated by the Montebelluna 150 working group which chose the logo and the payoff created by a female student of 4^A GRC who impressed for elegance, value and trait. In the logo the student wanted to represent the Mercato Vecchio column on the left and the Loggia dei Grani on the right, whose arches form the number 150.

== Culture ==
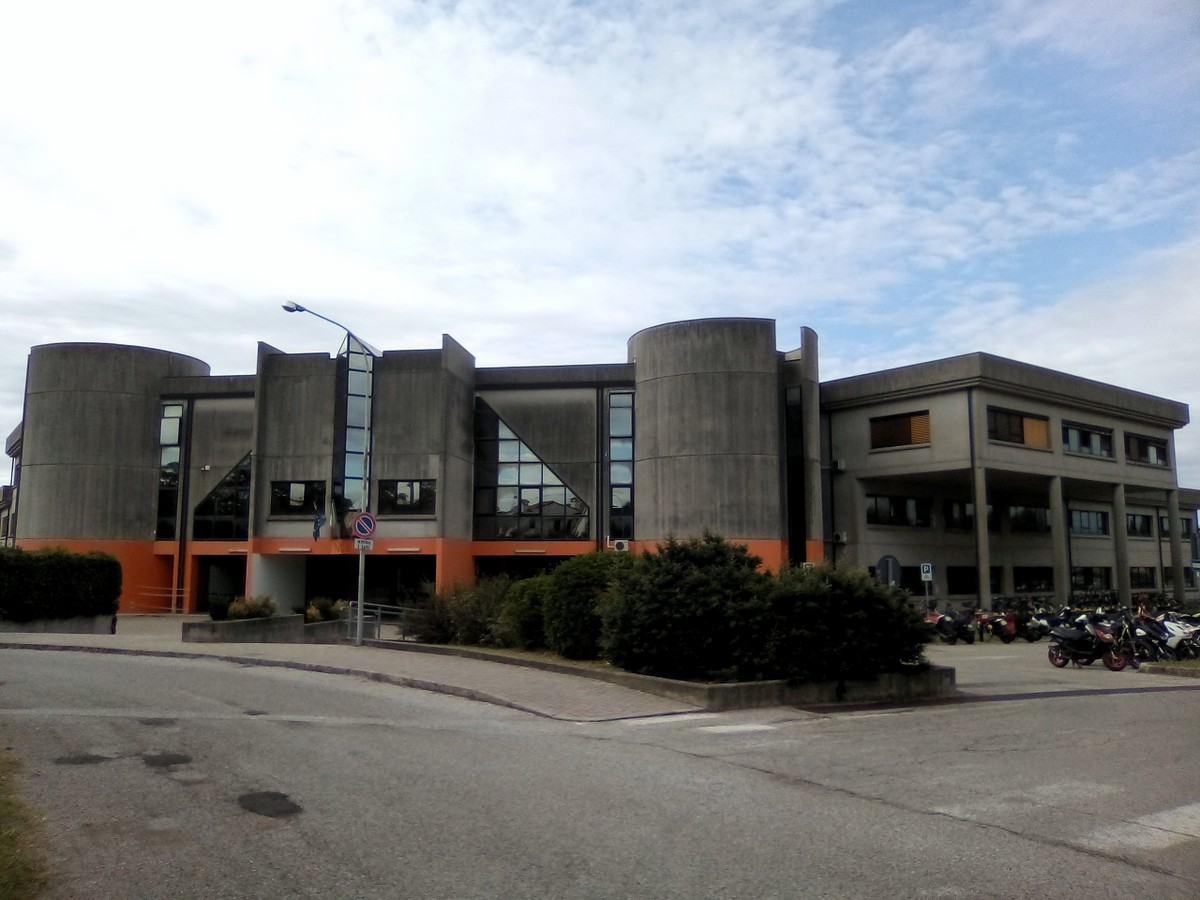
IIS Einaudi Scarpa

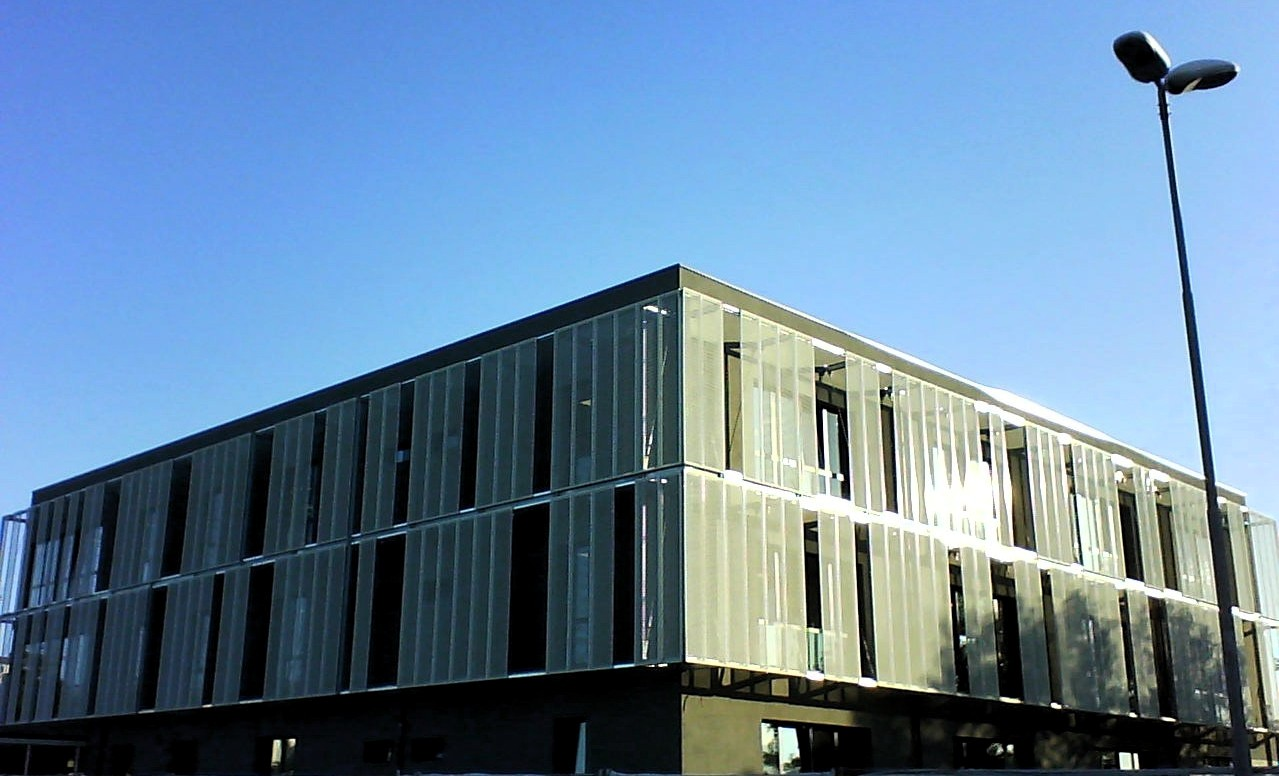
New professional headquarters IIS Einaudi Scarpa

=== Education ===
In the municipality there are numerous preschool, primary and lower secondary schools. The secondary schools of a certain importance for the city are the Primo Levi Higher Education Institute (former high school and scientific high school), the state high school "Angela Veronese" with the three addresses that characterize it linguistic, economic and social-art, the Einaudi-Scarpa Higher Education Institute, which houses the technological, economic and professional courses. Agricultural Institute of Castelfranco Veneto (I.S.I.S.S." D. Sartor ") since the nineties has also managed the detached school in the San Gaetano district.

The new building next to the Palazzetto O. Frassetto which will host the IIS Einaudi-Scarpa professional course and the detached IPSSAR Maffioli of Montebelluna is divided into two parts of different heights, respectively two and three floors, has two large internal patios and houses spaces for classrooms, laboratories, administrative offices and toilets.

=== Cultural institutions ===
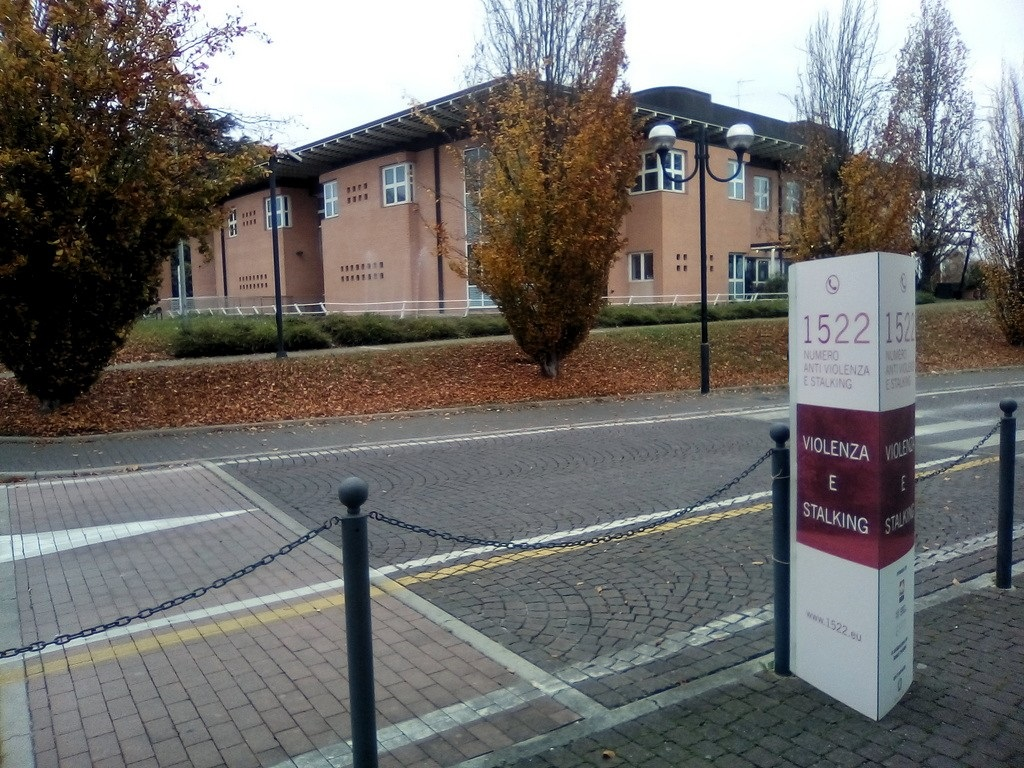
Municipal library

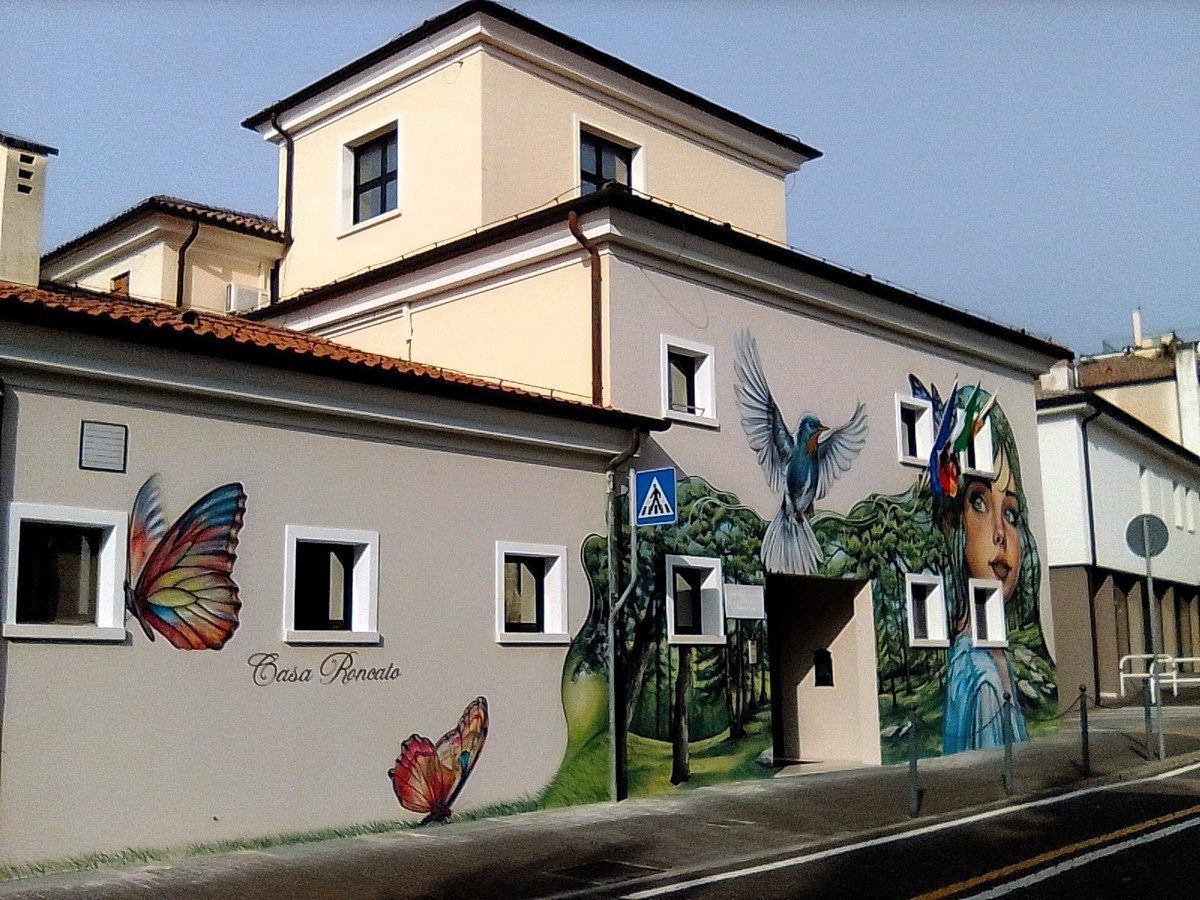
Casa Roncato

- Municipal Library of Montebelluna
- Natural History and Archeology Museum, in Villa Biagi
- "Roberto Binotto" Theater, in Villa Correr Pisani in Biadene
- MEVE - Veneto Memorial of the Great War, in Villa Correr Pisani
- Boot and sports shoe museum, in Villa Zuccareda Binetti: the Foundation is dedicated to revitalising and enriching the legacy of the historic Sportsystem District.
- Exhibition space in Villa Romivo
- Casa Roncato: a day-time social-assistance and recreational centre which began operating in October 1990.

=== Events ===
Since 1990, the "Palio del Vecchio Mercato" has been held in the town. On the first Sunday of September, the Montebelluna districts (Biadene, Busta, Caonada, Centro, Contea, Guarda, Mercato Vecchio, Pederiva, Posmon, San Gaetano, and Sant'Andrea) compete in a team race, pulling a farm cart loaded with typical products along the route from the Town Hall to Mercato Vecchio (almost two kilometers uphill). This is the road that merchants once had to laboriously travel to sell their goods at the local market. Since 2000, the Europalio has been an integral part of the Palio, in which Montebelluna's twinned towns compete against a team of locals.

The Ancient Festival of San Biagio takes place on February 3rd,organized by the Comitato Civico Mercato Vecchio of Montebelluna.

== Infrastructure and transport ==
=== Roads ===
Situated along the Schiavonesca-Marosticana state road 248, Montebelluna also represents an important stop on the so-called via Feltrina, current provincial road 2. The city is served by the toll booth of the same name on the Pedemontana Veneta superstrada, which opened to traffic on 28 May 2021.

Between 1913 and 1931 the city center and the aforementioned road routes saw the presence of the tracks of the Montebelluna-Asolo and Montebelluna-Valdobbiadene tramways, managed by the Società Veneta, which at the time represented an important development tool for the economy of the area.

The people of Montebelluna had been waiting for it for 50 years and on February 18, 2023, after the delay due to the particular international economic situation, the long-awaited railway underpass of via Piave was opened.

=== Urban mobility ===
The urban and extra-urban bus services are carried out by the company Mobilità di Marca. The municipal area is served by 4 urban lines. Montebelluna has a bus station from which the MOM lines branch off towards Treviso, the other municipalities of the Treviso area and also extended towards other locations outside the Province of Treviso.

=== Railways ===
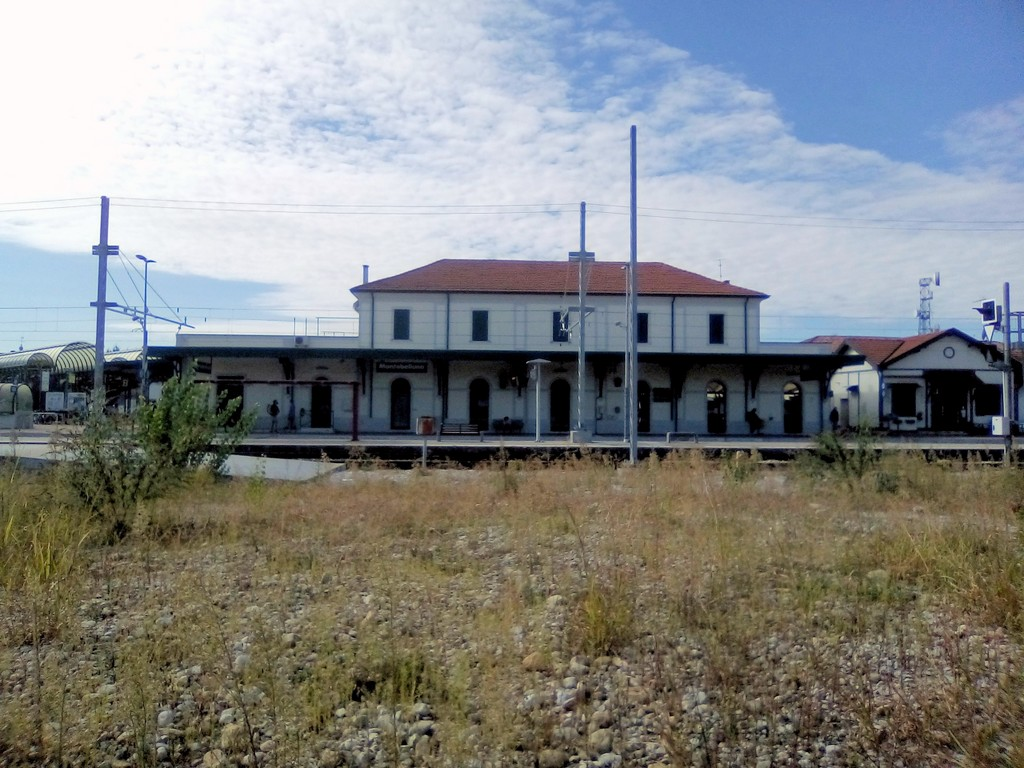
The Montebelluna station

The Montebelluna station, fully electrified since December 2020, is served by regional services carried out by Trenitalia as part of the service contract stipulated with the Veneto Region, once common to the tramways, located on the Calalzo-Padua line, and is the origin of the Treviso line.

Until 1966, the Montebelluna-Susegana railway also branched off from the same station, built in 1916 for military purposes.

With the update of the Rfi-Mit program contract of 24 July 2019, the missing funds were allocated for the electrification of the entire line up to Belluno, thus completing the last piece of the lower Belluno ring.

There was a first continuous interruption for the Montebelluna-Feltre section of the railway line, to allow another phase of electrification works on the section up to Belluno completed on 11 June 2022. As of 26 February, the Montebelluna – Feltre section will be closed again, still affected by electrification works until 09 September 2023. The third outage began on 25 February for electrification and maintenance work until 7 September 2024.

The electric trains entered service between Treviso and Belluno via Montebelluna in December 2025 and you can travel the Padua-Montebelluna-Belluno route without changes. The service timetable valid until June 13, 2026, he indicated an increase in services related to the Winter Olympic Games.

== Notable people ==
- Alberto Bottari de Castello, archbishop
- Aldo Serena, football player
- Attilio Tesser, football manager and former player
- Luca Badoer, F1 driver
- Marcello Agnoletto, football player
- Oscar Gatto, cyclist
- Luigi Datome, basketball player
- Federico Furlan, football player
- Angela Veronese (1778-1847), poet
- Patrizio Billio, football player
- Brando Badoer, racing driver
- Michele Rugolo, racing driver
- Giandomenico Basso, rally driver

== Sister cities ==
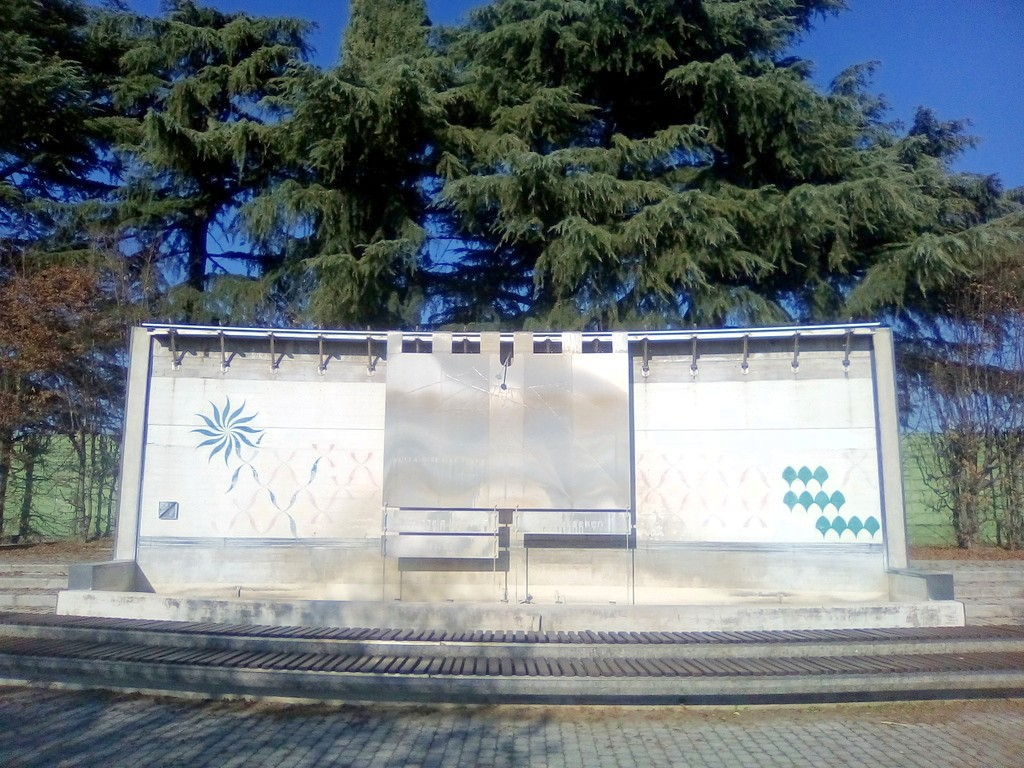
fountain in Dammarie-les-Lys square

- Dammarie-les-Lys, France, since 1987
- Oberkochen, Germany, since 1992
- Tata, Hungary, since 2000

== See also ==
- Calcio Montebelluna
