= Paese =

- Comune
- Comune di Paese
- Location within Italy Location within Veneto
- Coordinates: 45°40′N 12°9′E
- Country: Italy
- Region: Veneto
- Province: Province of Treviso (TV)
- Frazioni: Castagnole, Padernello, Porcellengo, Postioma

Area
  - Total: 38.0 km^{2} (14.7 sq mi)
- Highest elevation: 73 m (240 ft)
- Lowest elevation: 12 m (39 ft)

Population (November 2024)
  - Total: 22,234
  - Density: 585/km^{2} (1,520/sq mi)
- Time zone: UTC+1 (CET)
  - Summer (DST): UTC+2 (CEST)
- Postal code: 31038
- Dialing code: 0422
- Website: Official website

Paese (Venetian: Paexe) is a comune (municipality) in the Province of Treviso in the Italian region Veneto, located about 30 kilometres (19 mi) northwest of Venice and about 8 kilometres (5 mi) west of Treviso. As of 30 November 2024, it had a population of 22,234 and an area of 38.0 square kilometres (14.7 mi^{2}). “Paese” in Italian literally means “Village”.

== Geography ==
The municipality of Paese contains the frazioni (subdivisions, mainly villages and hamlets) of Castagnole, Padernello, Porcellengo and Postioma.

Paese borders the following municipalities: Istrana, Morgano, Ponzano Veneto, Quinto di Treviso, Trevignano, Treviso, Volpago del Montello.

The people of Paese speak both Italian and Venetian Language (the dialect of the Veneto region).

== Demographic evolution ==
Historical population

| Year | Pop. | ±% |
|---|---|---|
| 1861 | ? | — |
| 1871 | 4,304 | — |
| 1881 | 4,862 | +13.0% |
| 1901 | 5,731 | +17.9% |
| 1911 | 6,970 | +21.6% |
| 1921 | 7,879 | +13.0% |

| Year | Pop. | ±% |
|---|---|---|
| 1931 | 7,854 | −0.3% |
| 1936 | 7,916 | +0.8% |
| 1951 | 9,268 | +17.1% |
| 1961 | 9,543 | +3.0% |
| 1971 | 11,016 | +15.4% |
| 1981 | 13,825 | +25.5% |

| Year | Pop. | ±% |
|---|---|---|
| 1991 | 15,845 | +14.6% |
| 2001 | 18,407 | +16.2% |
| 2011 | 21,432 | +16.4% |
| 2021 | 22,012 | +2.7% |

Source: Data from ISTAT

=== Foreign ethnicities and minorities ===
As of December 31, 2023, foreigners residents in the municipality were 1,672, i.e. 7.6% of the population. The largest groups are shown below:

1. China 360
2. Romania 270
3. Kosovo 219
4. Albania 175
5. Moldova 86
6. Morocco 83
7. Nigeria 47
8. Ucraina 42
