= Treviso Centrale railway station =

Railway station in Italy

Treviso Centrale
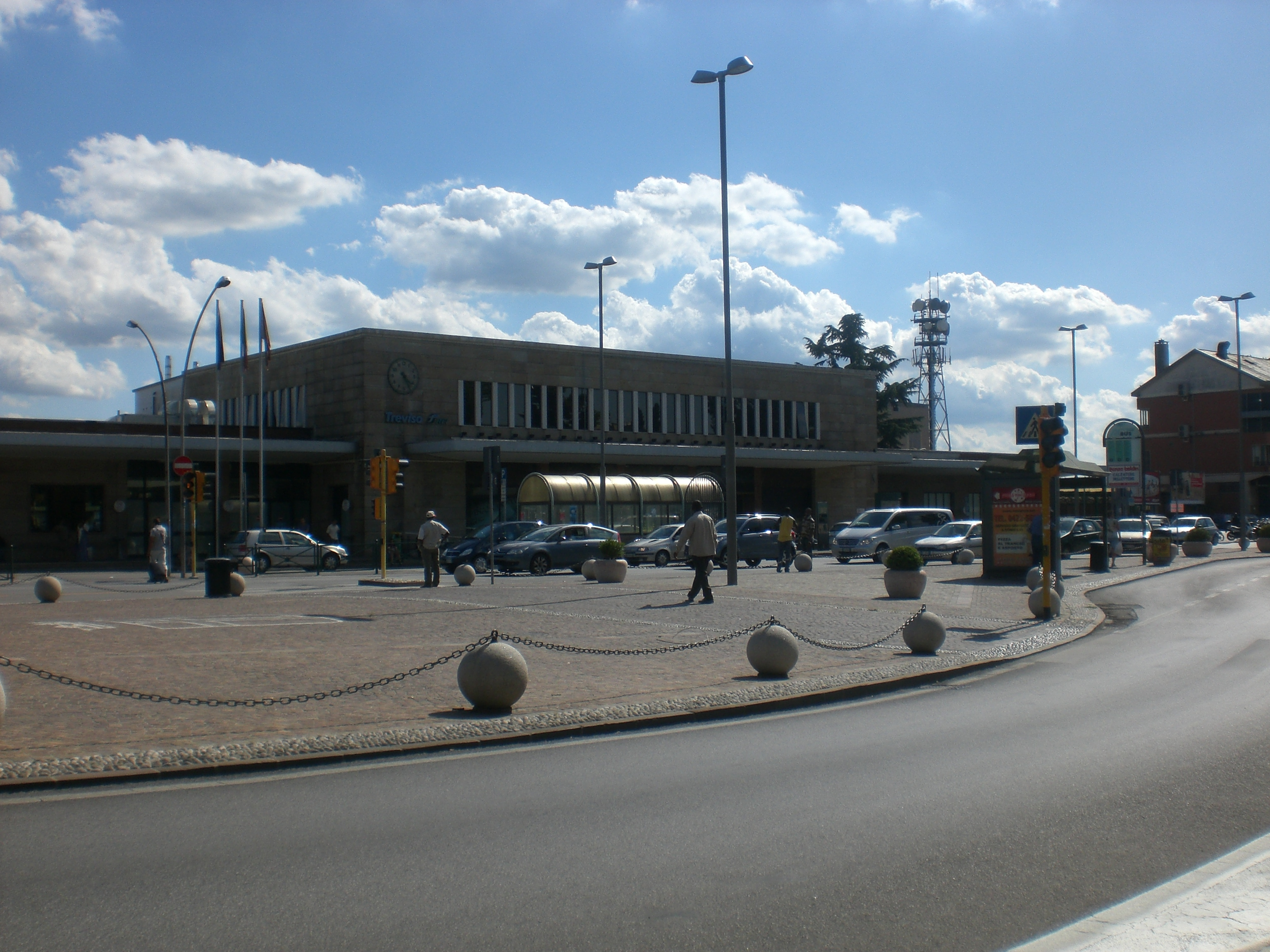
- The passenger building in the square

General information
- Location: Piazza Duca d'Aosta; 31100 Treviso; Treviso, Treviso, Veneto; Italy
- Coordinates: 45°39′36″N 12°14′41″E
- Owner: Rete Ferroviaria Italiana
- Operator: Centostazioni
- Lines: Venice–Udine; Montebelluna–Treviso; Vicenza–Treviso; Treviso–Portogruaro
- Train operators: Trenitalia
- Connections: Urban and suburban buses

History
- Opened: 1851; 175 years ago
Location
- Location within Veneto Location within Northern Italy Location within Italy

Treviso Centrale railway station (Italian: Stazione di Treviso Centrale) serves the city and comune of Treviso, in the Veneto region, northeastern Italy. Opened in 1851, the station forms part of the Venice–Udine railway, and is also a junction of three branch lines, to Montebelluna (and from there to Belluno and Calalzo along the Calalzo-Padova railway), Vicenza and Portogruaro, respectively.

Although Treviso Centrale is currently the only railway station in Treviso, it is so named to distinguish it from the two other railway facilities within the comune boundaries: Treviso Porta Santi Quaranta (a goods yard) and the marshalling yard at Treviso Scalo Motta.

Treviso Centrale is currently owned by Rete Ferroviaria Italiana (RFI). The commercial area of the passenger building is managed by Centostazioni. Train services to and from the station are operated by Trenitalia. Each of these companies is a subsidiary of Ferrovie dello Stato Italiane (FS), Italy's state-owned rail company.

== Features ==
Services inside the station include ticketing, a waiting area, shops, offices, and the headquarters of the Railway Police.

Eight tracks run through the station. As they are all equipped with platforms, they can all be used for passenger service.

The platforms are connected by two subways. One of them connects the historic district of San Zeno, the platforms and the passenger building, and ends on the other side of the ring road opposite the passenger building. The other subway, to the west of the first one, connects the platforms with the parking station.

Treviso Centrale is also equipped with a locomotive shed and some stabling facilities for passenger rolling stock that is not in use.

There are two goods yards. One is located just beyond the station towards Udine (Treviso Scalo Motta), without crossing loops but with various sidings and a small office building. The second yard re-uses the freight yard and the warehouse of the former Treviso Porta Santi Quaranta railway station (now incorporated into Treviso Centrale). Although the goods service is rather modest compared to the past, it is still in operation.

Rail traffic at the station is handled with an ACEI type control console with tabulation of train paths and routes.

== Train services ==
The station is served by the following services:

- High speed services (Frecciarossa) Udine - Treviso - Venice - Padua - Bologna - Florence - Rome
- High speed services (Frecciarossa) Udine - Treviso - Venice - Padua - Verona - Milan
- Intercity services (EuroCity) Vienna - Klagenfurt - Villach - Udine - Treviso - Venice
- Night train (CityNightLine) Munich - Tarvisio - Udine - Treviso - Venice
- Night train (EuroNight) Vienna - Linz - Salzburg - Villach - Udine - Treviso - Venice
- Night train (Intercity Notte) Trieste - Udine - Venice - Padua - Bologna - Rome
- Express services (Regionale Veloce) Trieste - Gorizia - Udine - Treviso - Venice
- Regional services (Treno regionale) Trieste - Gorizia - Udine - Treviso - Venice
- Regional services (Treno regionale) Vicenza - Citadella - Castelfranco Veneto - Treviso
- Regional services (Treno regionale) Padua - Castelfranco Veneto - Treviso
- Local services (Treno regionale) Treviso - Portogruaro
- Local services (Treno regionale) (Belluno -) Montebelluna - Treviso

== Passenger and train movements ==
All trains transiting through Treviso Centrale stop there, on their way to various parts of Italy. The main destinations are Venice, Trieste, Udine, Vicenza, Portogruaro and Milan. There are a few trains in international service to Austria or Germany.

With about 7 million passenger movements each year, Treviso Centrale is one of the busiest in the Veneto in terms of passenger movements.
