= Matteo Civitali =

Italian sculptor (1436–1501)

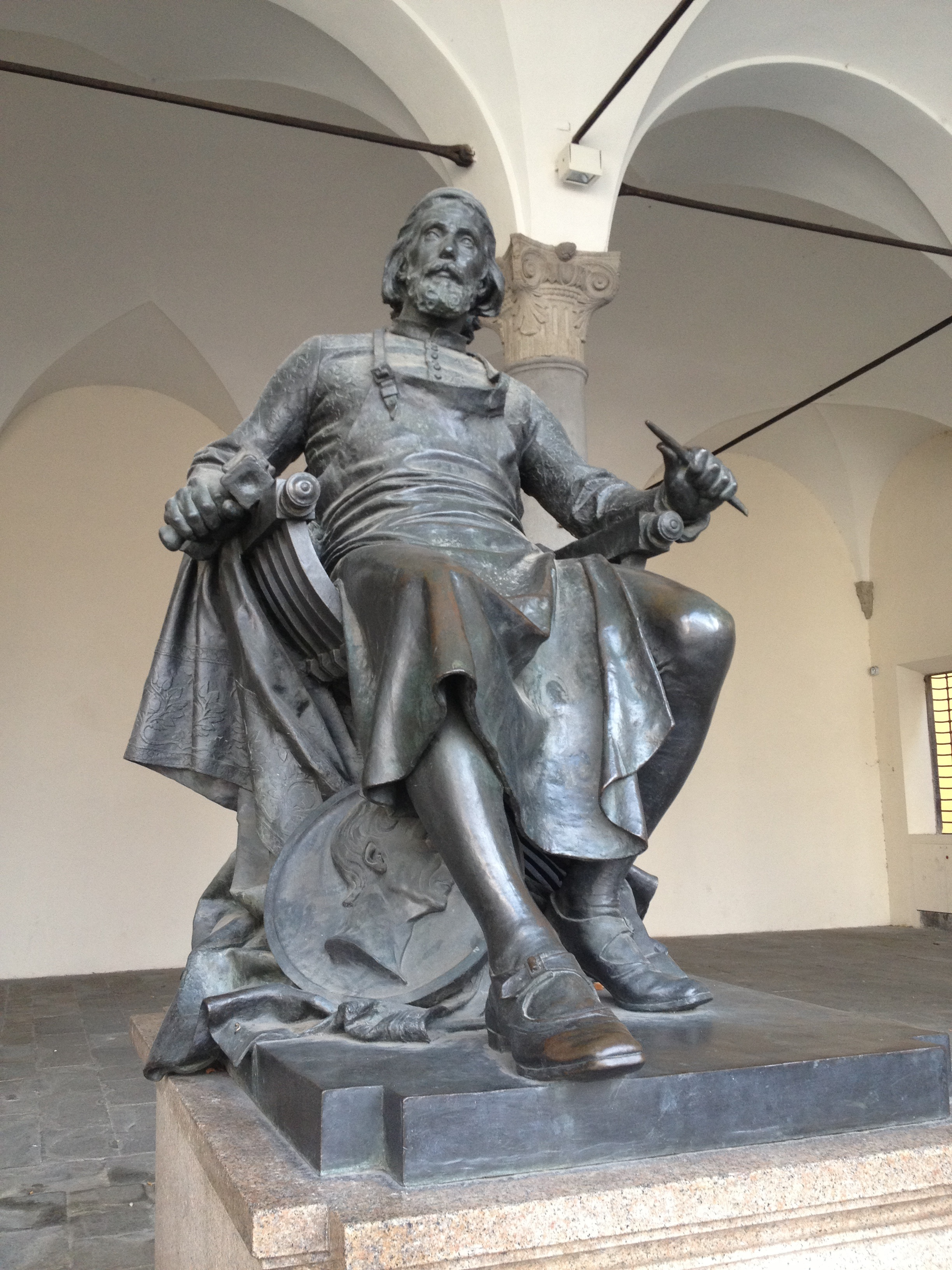
- Statue of Civitali (by Arnaldo Fazzi) in the portico of Palazzo Pretoriale, Lucca
- Born: Donato di Niccolò di Betto Bardi; 5 June 1436; Lucca, Republic of Lucca
- Died: 12 October 1501 (aged 65); Lucca, Republic of Lucca
- Resting place: San Cristoforo, Lucca
- Known for: Sculpture, Architecture, Painting
- Movement: Early Renaissance

Matteo Civitali (June 5, 1436 – October 12, 1501) was an Italian Renaissance sculptor and architect, painter and engineer from Lucca. He was a leading artistic personality of the Early Renaissance in Lucca, where he was born and where most of his work remains.

== Biography ==
=== Early life and education ===
Matteo Civitali was born in Lucca on 5 June 1436. He was trained in Florence, where Antonio Rossellino and Mino da Fiesole influenced his mature style. He is mentioned with the name of matteo Civitali by Vasari in his biography of Jacopo della Quercia, and appears to have taken up the art of sculpture at the age of 40 years, after years of practicing as a "barber" (surgeon).

=== Paintings ===
While considered to be the most important marble sculptor outside Florence during the second half of the fifteenth century, historical evidence pointed to Civitali's activity as a painter as well. However, no painting could firmly be identified to him until the discovery of an original contract by Roberto Ciardi in 1997 for a triptych on the high altar of San Michele di Antraccoli, a church six kilometers east of his hometown of Lucca, which was formerly ascribed to the Master of Benabbio. The contract revealed that both Civitali and Baldassarre di Biagio were commissioned to complete the altarpiece.

Civitali's elusive painting career is known only through collaboration, in this case with the Florentine painter Baldassarre di Biagio in the Madonna and Child with Saints (1469; Greenville, South Carolina, Bob Jones University Museum & Gallery). The sculptor's fondness for Donatello is already detected in the painted figure of St. Michael the Archangel, quoted from Donatello's David (Florence, Bargello). In 1481 he joined Michele Ciampanti on a polyptych for the church of San Romano, Lucca, though the work no longer survives.

=== Sculpture ===
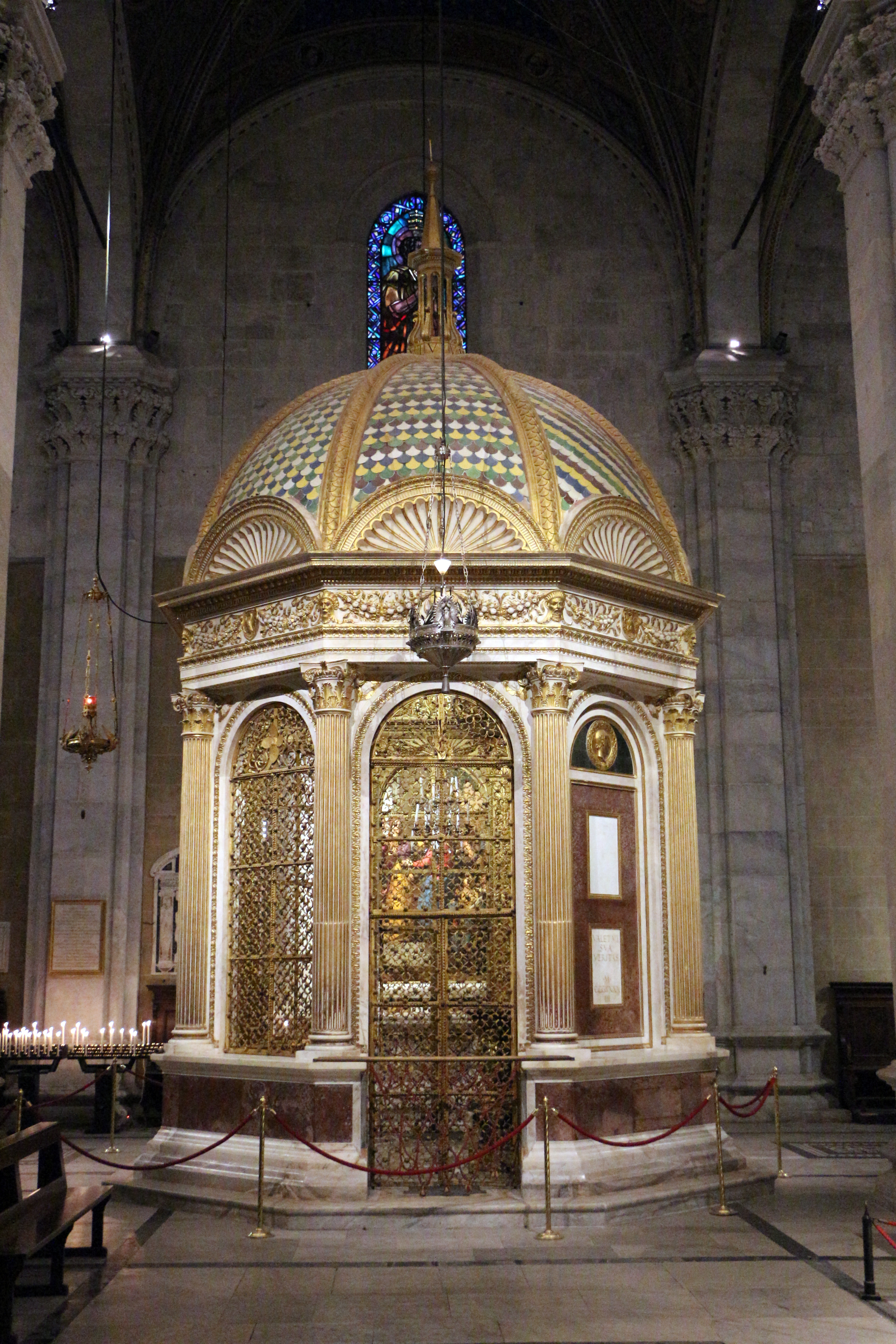
Civitali's Tempietto, 1484, Lucca Cathedral

Between the early 1470s and the late 1480s Civitali realized his most celebrated architectural works. Among them stand out the tomb of Pietro da Noceto (1472; Lucca Cathedral), the altar of the Sacrament in Lucca Cathedral (1473–after 1476), the tombs of Domenico Bertini and Sveva Risaliti (1479; Lucca Cathedral), the chapel of the Holy Face of Lucca (1484; Lucca Cathedral) and the tomb of St. Romanus (1490; Lucca, San Romano). The most important commission executed by Civitali is the Tempietto, a freestanding chapel built in 1484 to enshrine the Holy Face of Lucca. The octagonal chapel, standing in the left nave of the Cathedral of San Martino, Lucca, in apparently indebted to the contemporary Florentine architecture of Michelozzo and Filippo Brunelleschi. The Duomo contains also a virtual anthology of Matteo's sculpture, since he worked at the San Romano Altar, and also sculpted the statue of St. Sebastian in the back of the Holy Face Shrine, and two monumental graves in the right transept.

The relief of Faith (now in the National Museum of Florence, Italy) was originally the first segment part of Hope and Love, a triple relief. This marble figure of Faith was acquired by the Uffizi Gallery in 1830 from the prior of a church at Paterno near Florence. This piece of work existed in the church of San Michele in Foro, Lucca.

=== Later work ===
The six life-size, free-standing statues (Adam, Eve, St. Elizabeth, St. Zacharias, Isaiah and Habakkuk) executed for the chapel of St. John the Baptist in Genoa Cathedral are usually dated to 1496. They are infused with a spirit and aesthetic only partly evolved from Civitali’s earlier works and are characterized by pathos and subtly dramatic expressive faces. In particular, the figures of St. Elizabeth and St. Zacharias possess a quality of realism and emotion similar to contemporary Emilian sculpture. Matteo Civitali died on 12 October 1501, aged 65 and was buried in San Cristoforo, Lucca.

== Legacy and family ==
Matteo’s legacy as an architect is perhaps more evident in his large marble monuments in Lucca Cathedral. His strict use of symmetry and carefully calculated harmonious proportions reflect a sense of order similar to that in the architecture of Brunelleschi and Michelozzo. In addition to his many other activities, Matteo, with his brother Bartolomeo Civitali (d. c. 1478), also established Lucca’s first printing press in 1477.

By the late 1460s Matteo had established a large and active workshop in Lucca that, after his death, continued to operate until the last quarter of the 16th century. Matteo’s son Nicolao, also a sculptor and architect, assumed leadership of the workshop following Matteo’s death; Matteo’s nephew, Masseo di Bartolomeo Civitali (d. Lucca, after 1511), was an accomplished wood-carver, responsible for the main doors on Lucca Cathedral and in 1498 carved a wooden ciborium for a marble pulpit by Matteo Civitali also in Lucca Cathedral. Masseo’s brother, Vincenzo di Bartolomeo Civitali (b. Lucca, before 1477), also worked in the shop; his only known work is a marble figure of St Peter (1505–6; Lucca, San Frediano).

Lorenzo Stagi (1455–1506) was trained in the Civitali workshop and established his own modest dynasty of artists. Among Lorenzo’s more important works are the high altar for San Martino, Pietrasanta and the marble choir in the Lucca Cathedral, on which he collaborated with Matteo Civitali. Matteo’s grandson, Vincenzo di Nicolao Civitali (1523–1597) was active as an architect, engineer and sculptor in Lucca and Rome. Among his important works are the monument of Bishop Giovanni Guidiccioni (1541–6) in San Francesco, Lucca, and the chapel of the Sacrament in Lucca Cathedral (1575–85).

== Selected works ==
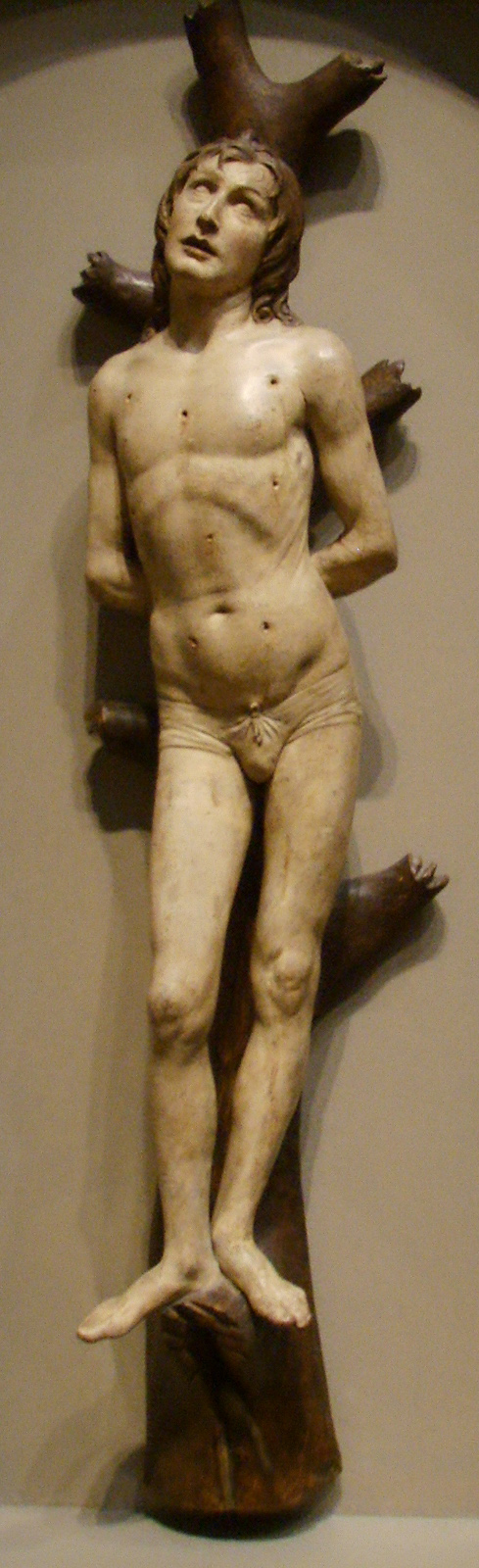
San Sebastian, c. 1492, National Gallery of Art, Washington, D.C.

In Lucca Cathedral:

- The Tempietto of the Holy Face of Lucca;
- Tomb of Pietro di Noceto;
- Tomb of Domenico Bertini;
- Altar tomb of St. Regulus;
- Marble portrait of the scholar Giovan Pietro d'Avenza.

In the Church of the Santissima Trinità, Lucca:

- Nursing Madonna (This image became a focal point for local devotion, particularly for healing children afflicted with whooping cough, leading to the name Madonna della Tosse);

In Genoa Cathedral:

- Statues representing Adam, Eve, Abraham, Saints Zacchariah and Elizabeth, and others for the chapel of St. John the Baptist;

In the Church of Santa Maria Assunta, Benabbio (Lucca):

- Madonna Enthroned, in collaboration with Baldassarre di Biagio;

In the Basilica of San Frediano, Lucca:

- Virgin Annunciate;

In the Museo d'Arte Sacra, Camaiore, Lucca:

- Virgin Annunciate;

In the Church of San Michele in Foro, Lucca:

- Virgin with Child.
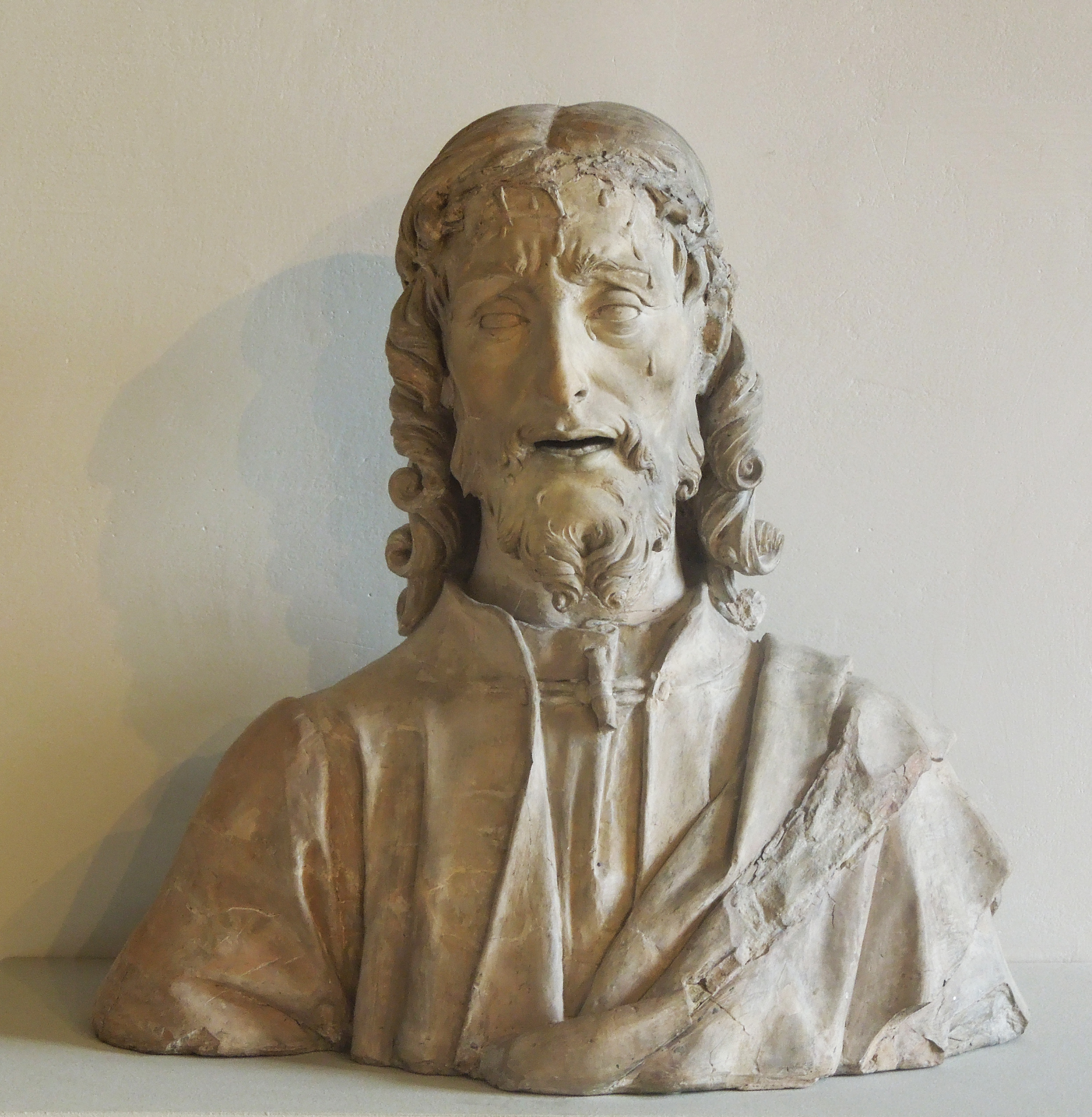
The Man of Sorrows, National Gallery Prague

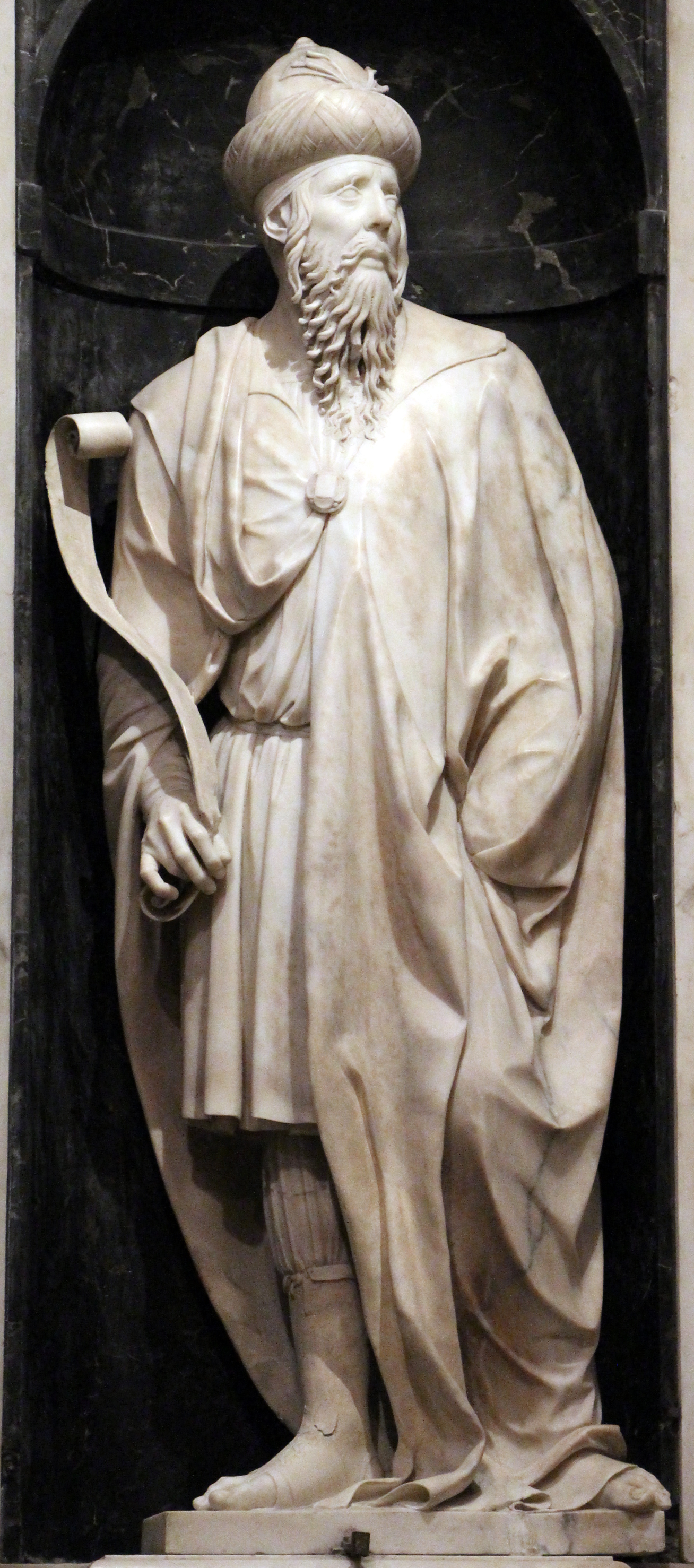
Isaias, 1496, San Lorenzo, Genoa

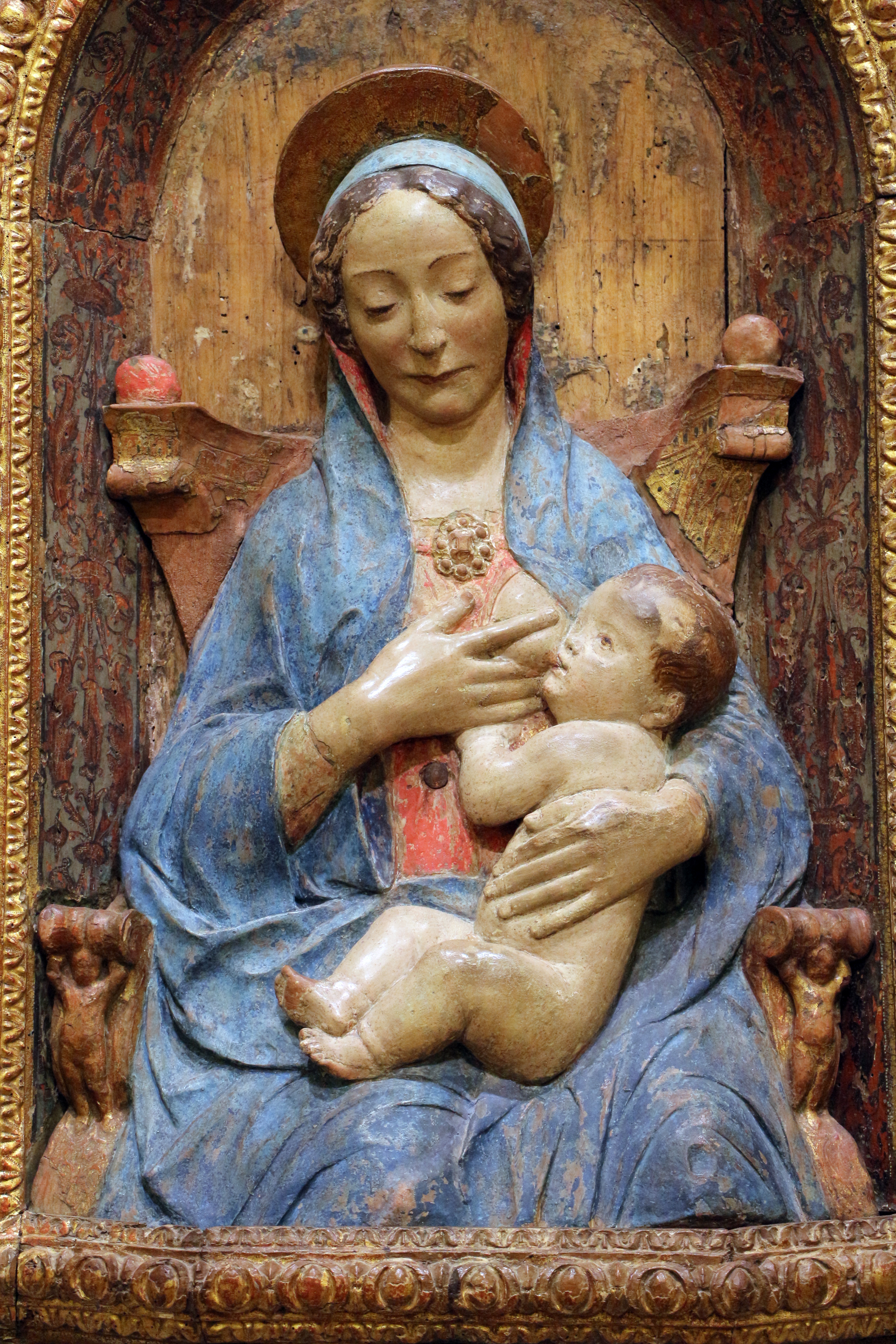
Nursing Madonna, National Museum of Villa Guinigi, Lucca

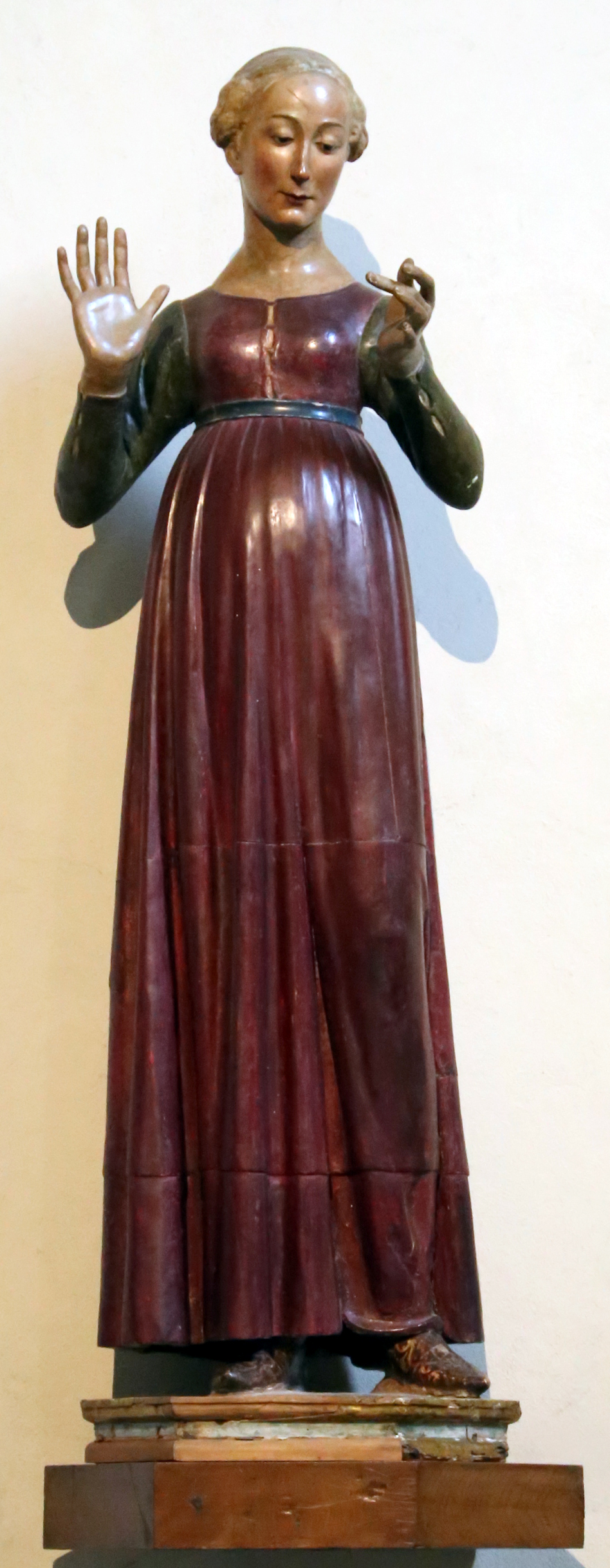
Virgin Annunciate, 1490, San Frediano, Lucca

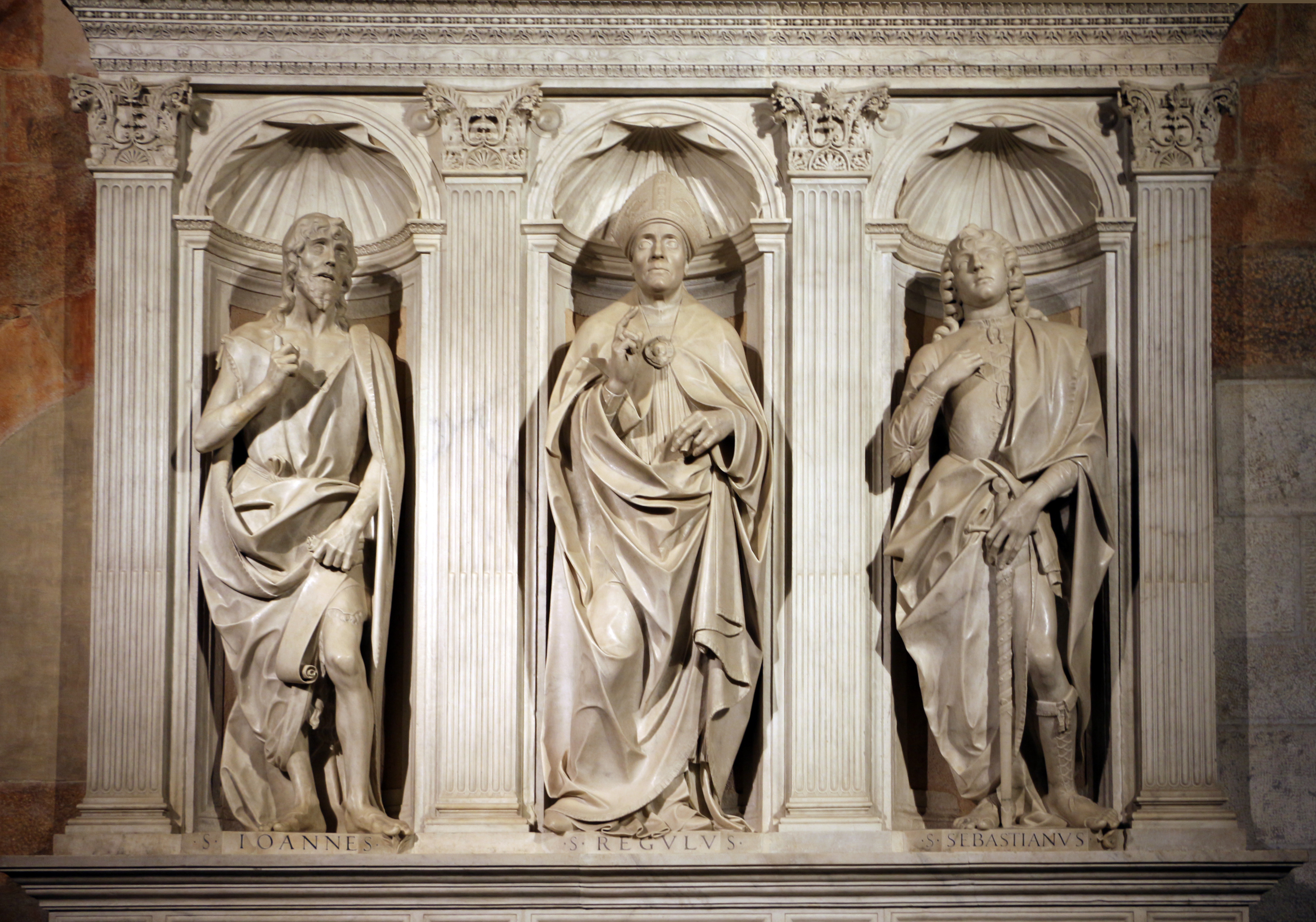
Altar tomb of St. Regulus (detail), Lucca Cathedral

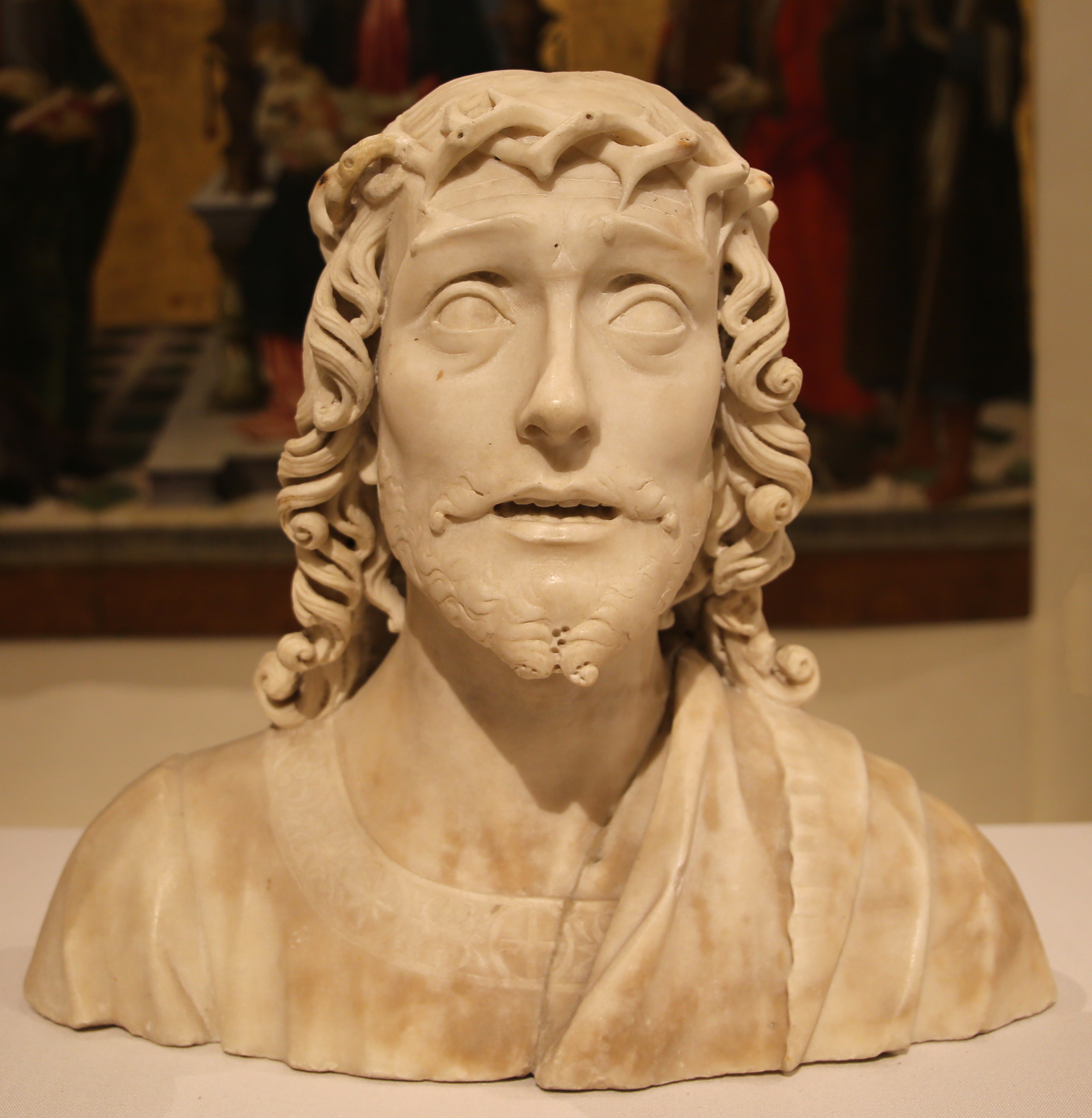
Christ with the crown of thorns, National Museum of Villa Guinigi, Lucca

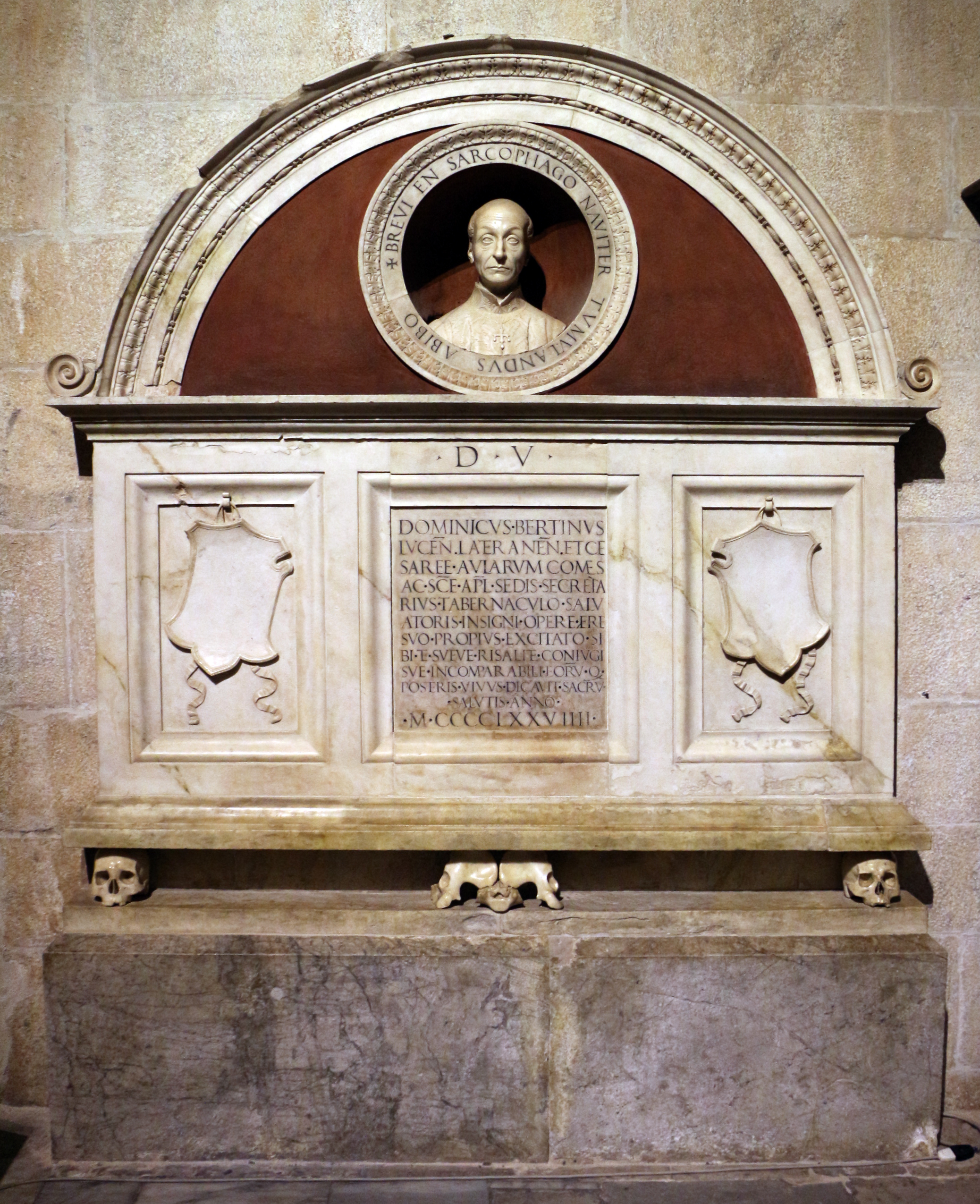
Tomb of Domenico Bertini, 1479, Lucca Cathedral

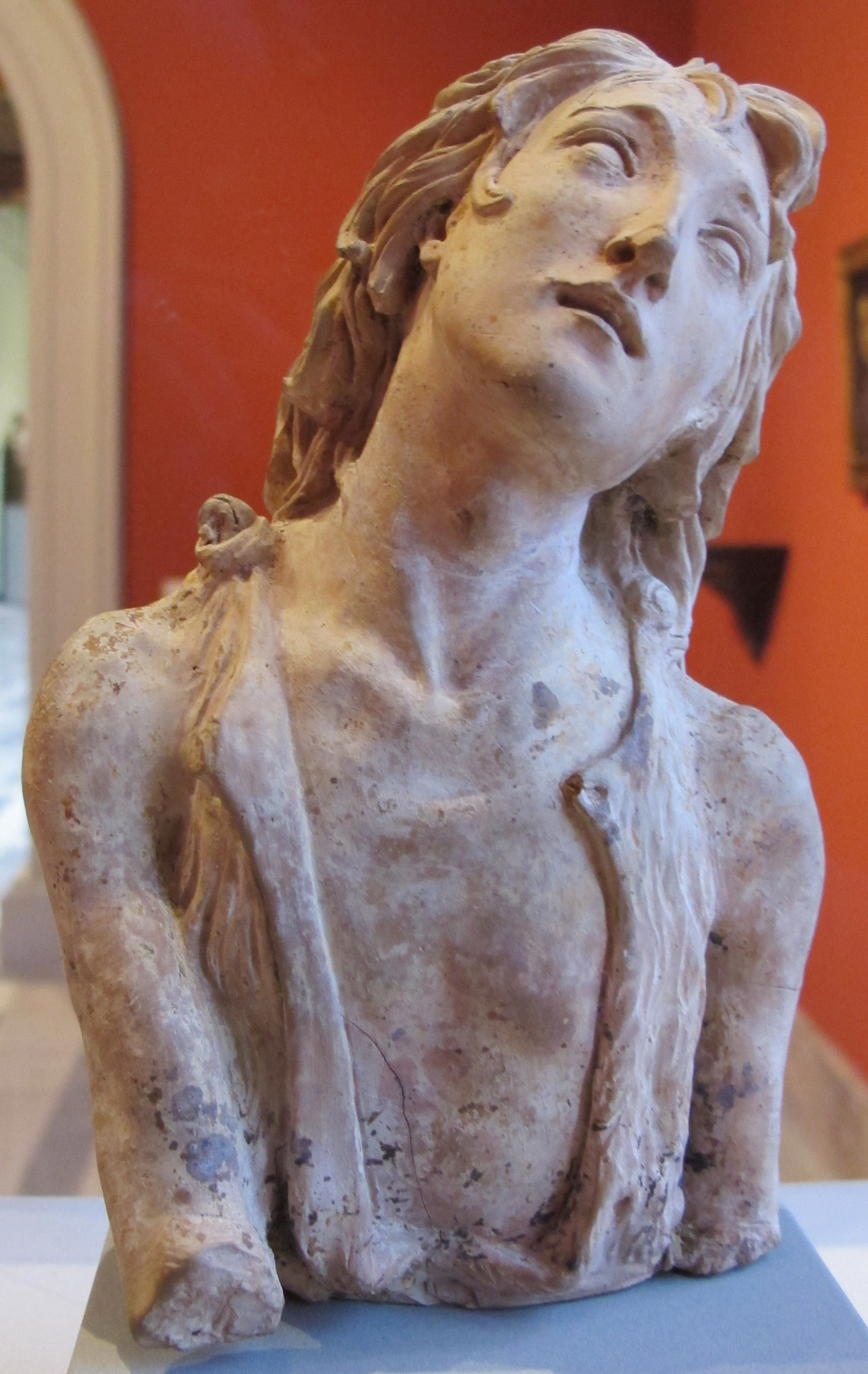
St. John the Baptist, 1480, Santi Giovanni e Reparata, Lucca

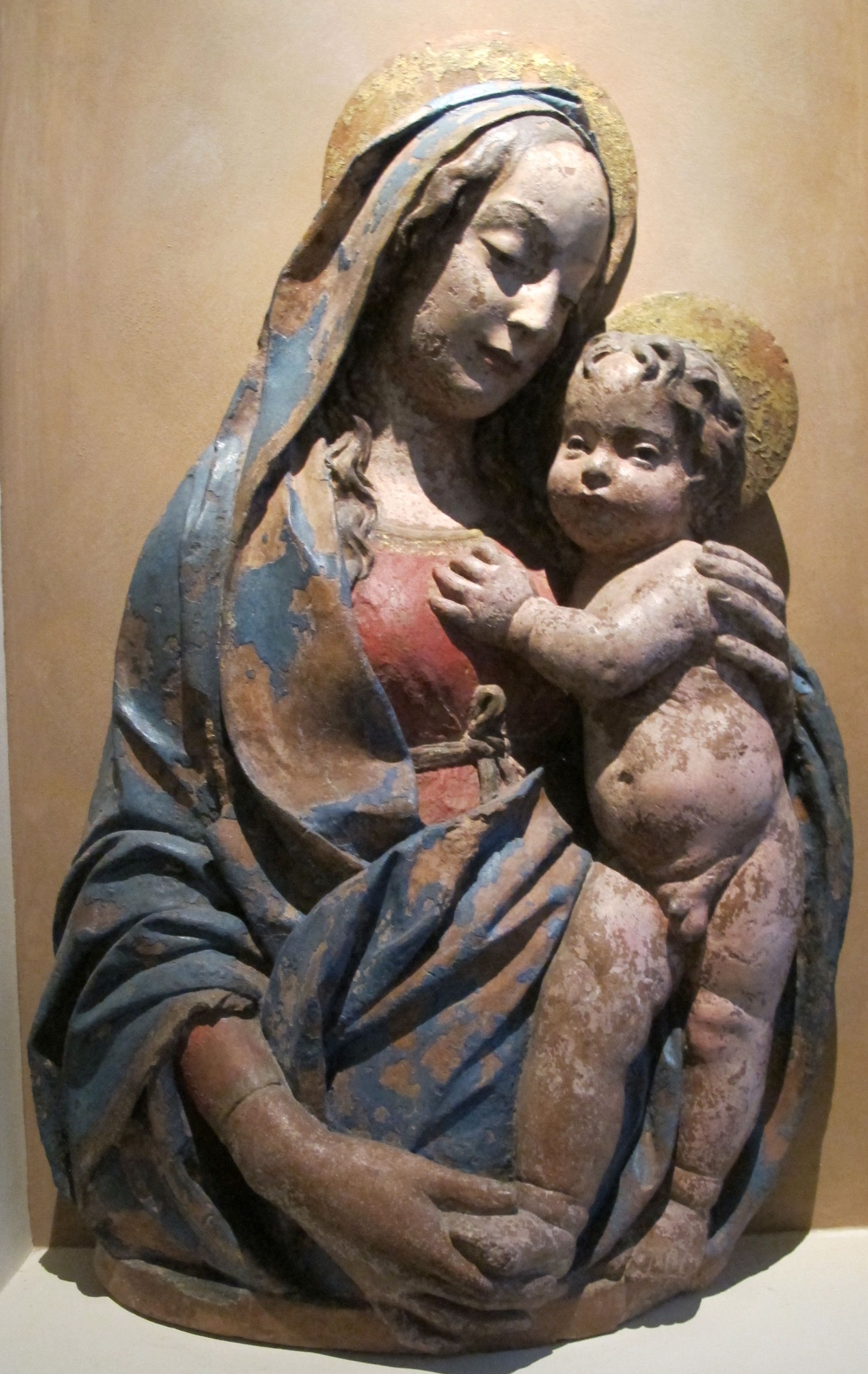
Madonna with Child, National Museum of Villa Guinigi, Lucca

== References and sources ==
=== Sources ===
- Bule, Steven; Nolan, John (2003). "Civitali [Civitale], Matteo (di Giovanni)". Grove Art Online. Oxford University Press. doi:10.1093/gao/9781884446054.article.T017919.
- "Matteo Civitali and his time" Exhibition, Villa Guinigi, Lucca, 2004.
- Triptych of The Virgin and Child with Saints attributed to Matteo Civitali and Baldassarre di Biagio is in the collection of the Museum & Gallery, Inc. in Greenville, SC.
- Harms, Martina, Matteo Civitali, Bildhauer der Fruhrenaissance in Lucca (Beitrage zur Kunstgeschichte des Mittelalters und der Renaissance, 1) Münster: Rhema-Verlag, 1995. ISBN 978-3-930454-00-6. Comprehensive monograph.
- Soprani, Raffaello (1769). Carlo Giuseppe Ratti (ed.). Delle vite de' pittori, scultori, ed architetti genovesi; Tomo secundo scritto da Carlo Giuseppe Ratti. Genoa: Stamperia Casamara. pp. 373–374.
