= Michele Ciampanti =

Italian painter

Michele Ciampanti (active 1463-1510) was an Italian painter active mainly in Lucca. This painter has been identified as matching Berenson's putative Master of Stratonice, and is also called Michele di Michele Ciampanti.

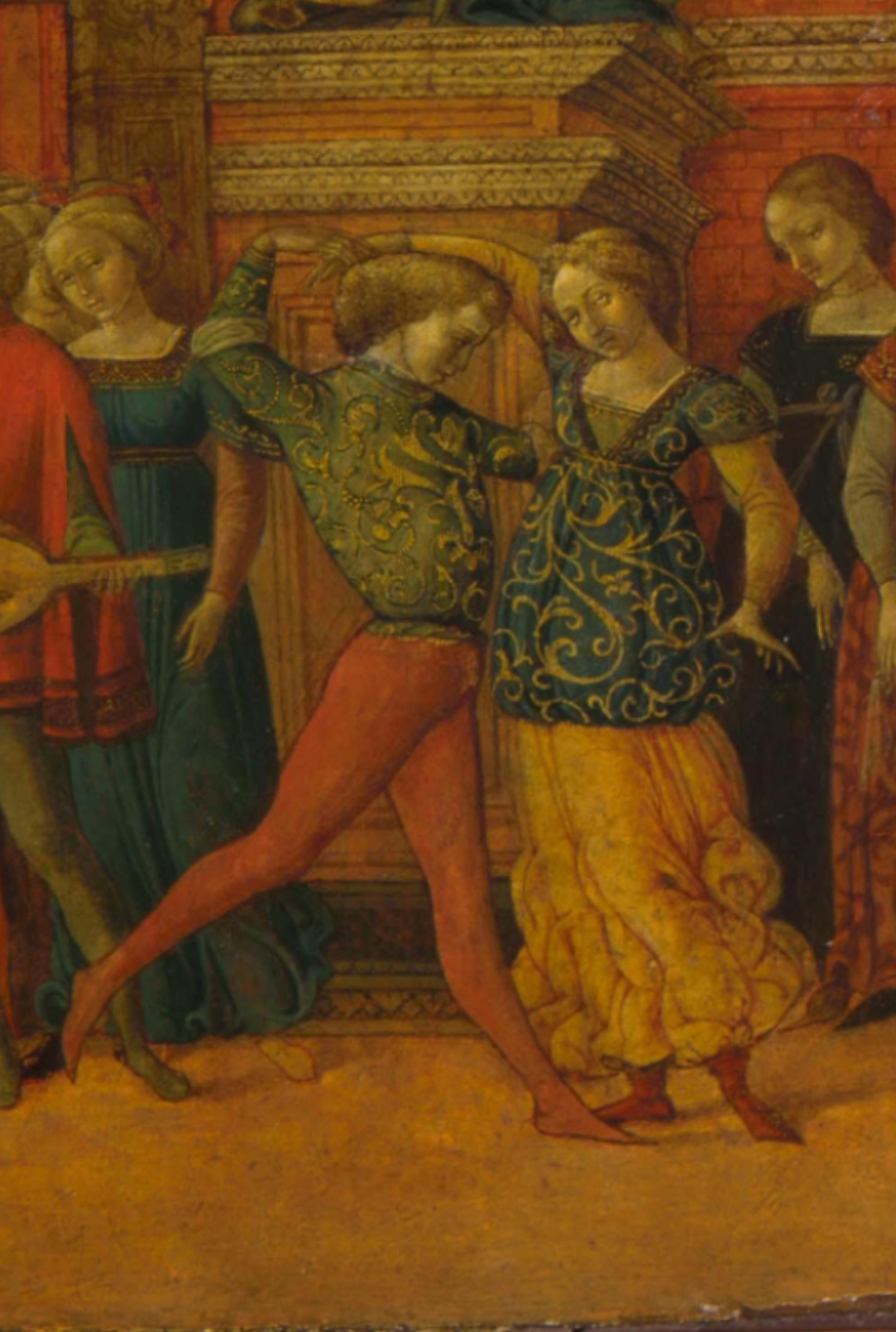
Detail of Antiochus and Stratonice at Huntington Library

== Biography ==
Biographical details about the painter were collected in the twentieth century. He seems to have either traveled to Siena or formed contacts with the work of other contemporary Tuscan painters, such as the Florentines, Filippino Lippi and Sandro Botticelli as well as the Sienese, Matteo di Giovanni and Francesco di Giorgio, although it is unclear who influenced who. The cassetoni depicting the scene of Stratonice and (the son of) Antiochus (c. 1470), now at the Huntington Library in California. In addition, works at the Metropolitan Museum of Art in New York, including the Cassoni of the Two Triumphs have been attributed to him. An Adoration of the Shepherds at the Galleria Cini in Venice is also attributed to this painter.

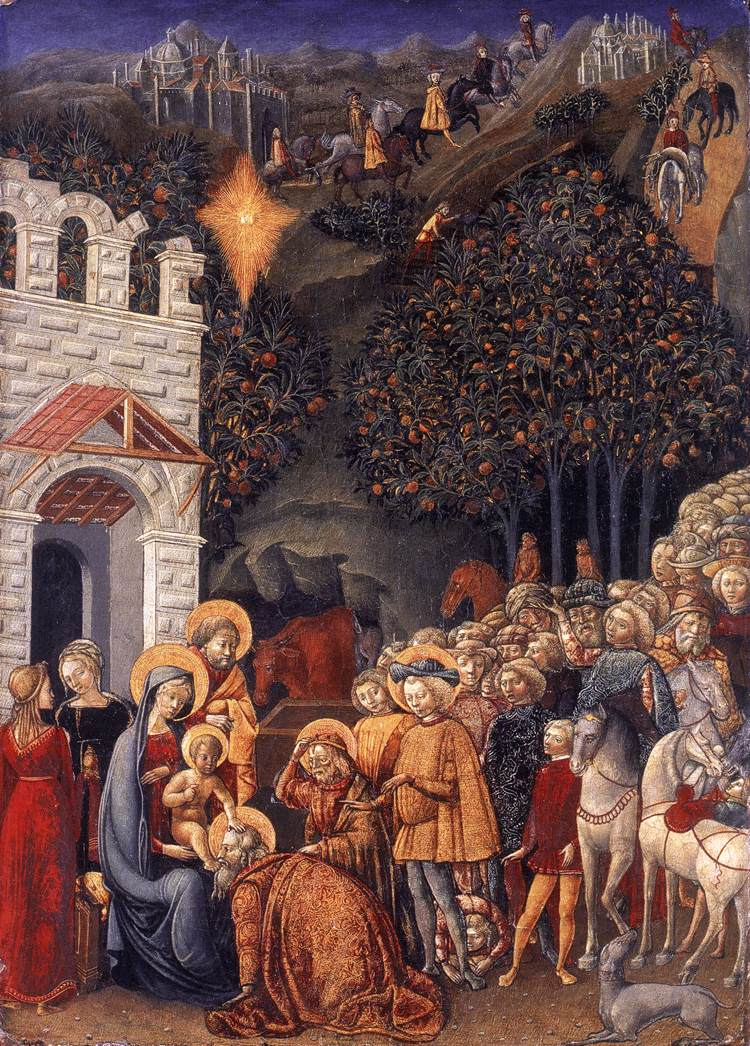
Adoration of the Magi

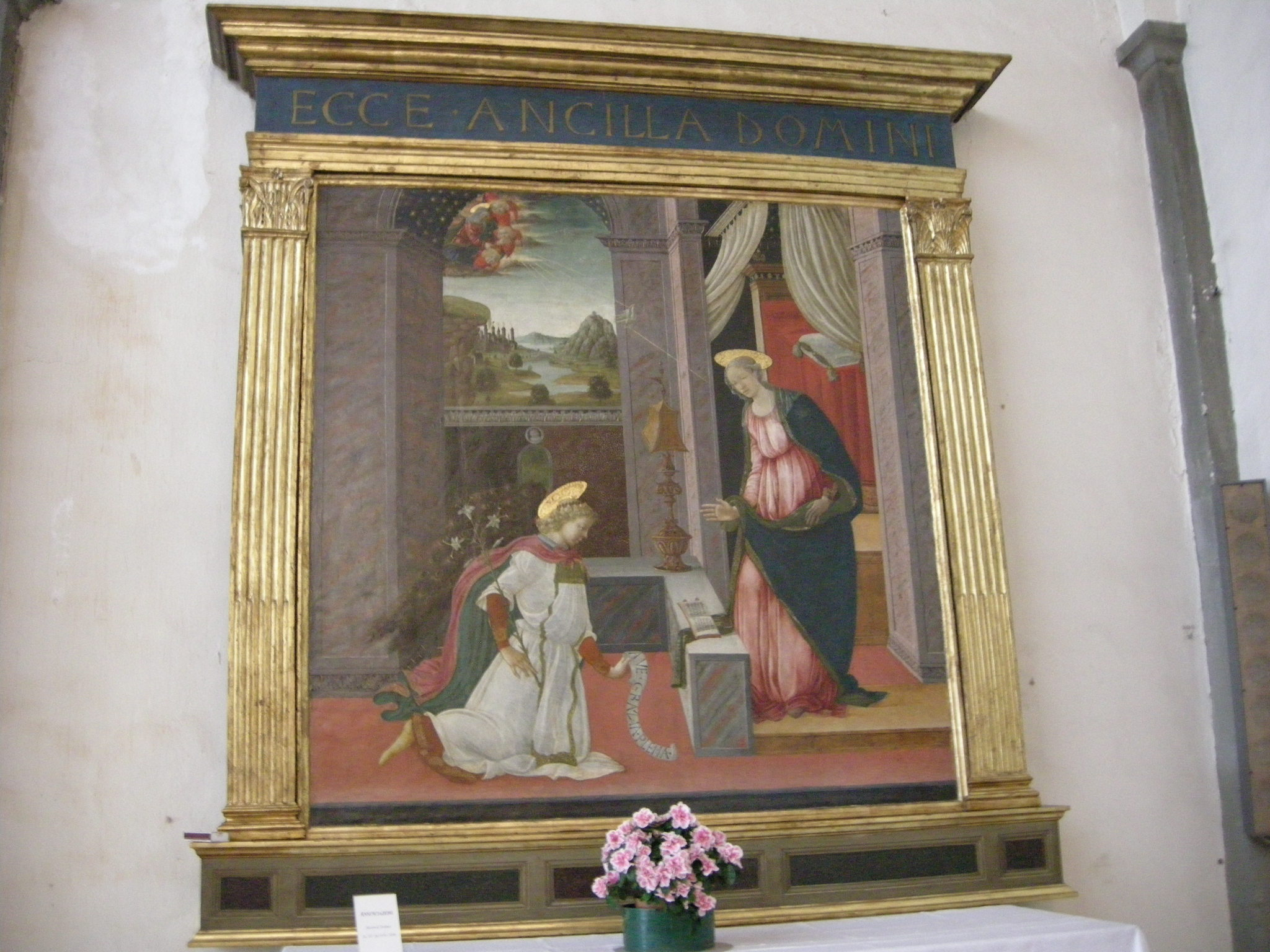
Annunciation at San Giovannino dei Cavalieri, Florence

A short biography states that he was the illegitimate son, and likely pupil, of the painter Borghese di Piero Borghese, also known as the Master of the Santi Quirico e Giulitta. Documents state Michele Ciampanti was made heir of the painter in 1463, and attribute his birth to prior to 1447. He has been identified as likely a Michele da Lucca at work in 1467 in the Duomo di Pisa. The cassetoni of Stratonice and others depicting the Myth of Orpheus and Euridice and the Rape of Proserpine are attributed to a Florentine phase in the 1470s. He is said to have collaborated with Matteo Civitali and Baldassare di Biagio around 1476 in Lucca. Ciampanti is said to have painted frescoes in 1485 for the Chapel of San Regolo and in 1486 for the Ospedale di Camaiore in Lucca. He is documented alongside Vincenzo Frediano (Master of the Immaculate Conception) as pricing a work for the Oratory of San Lorenzo. His son, Ansano (Maestro di San Filippo) emerges in the late 1490s, and likely collaborated with him in some frescoes in the Baptistry of Lucca. In 1496, he painted for the tribune of the Pietrasanta Cathedral.

== Other sources ==
- R. Massagli: La bottega dei Ciampanti: il Maestro di Stratonice e il Maestro di San Filippo In: Proporzioni, N.S. 2/3.2001/02(2003), S. 59-103 (zur Werkstatt des Meisters, italienisch)
- M. Tazartes: Anagrafe lucchese: II. Michele Ciampanti; il maestro di Stratonice? In: Ricerche di storia dell'arte, 26.1985, S. 18-27 (italienisch)
- “Stratonice-Master” in The Grove Dictionary of Art: Macmillan Publishers 2000 (englisch)
