= San Michele in Foro =

Basilica in Lucca, Tuscany, Italy

Coordinates: 43°50′35″N 10°30′10″E

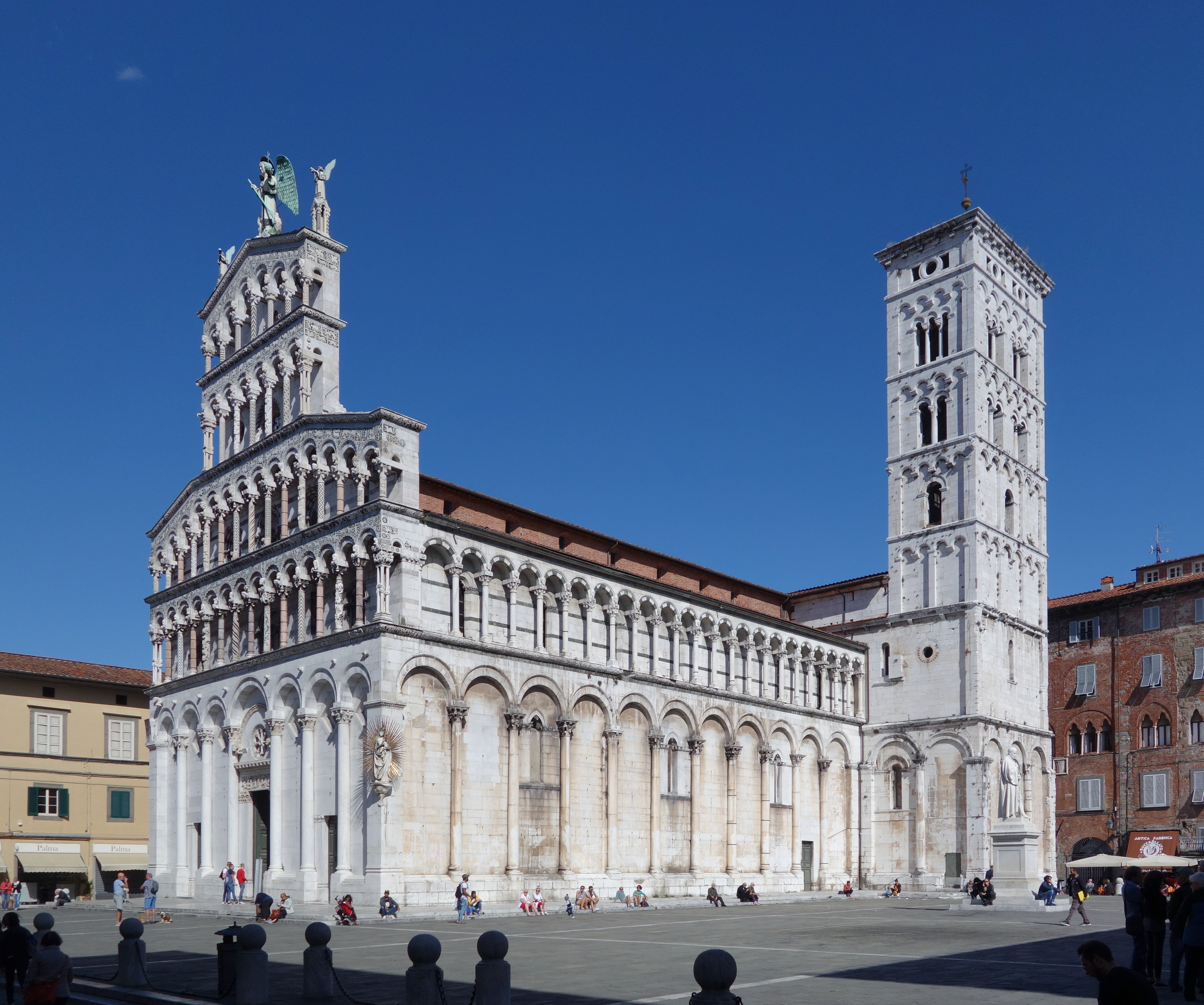
San Michele in Foro

San Michele in Foro is a Roman Catholic basilica church in Lucca, Tuscany, central Italy, built over the ancient Roman forum. Until 1370 it was the seat of the Consiglio Maggiore ("Major Council"), the commune's most important assembly. It is dedicated to Archangel Michael.

== History ==
The church is mentioned for the first time in 795 as ad foro (in the forum). It was rebuilt after 1070 by will of Pope Alexander II.

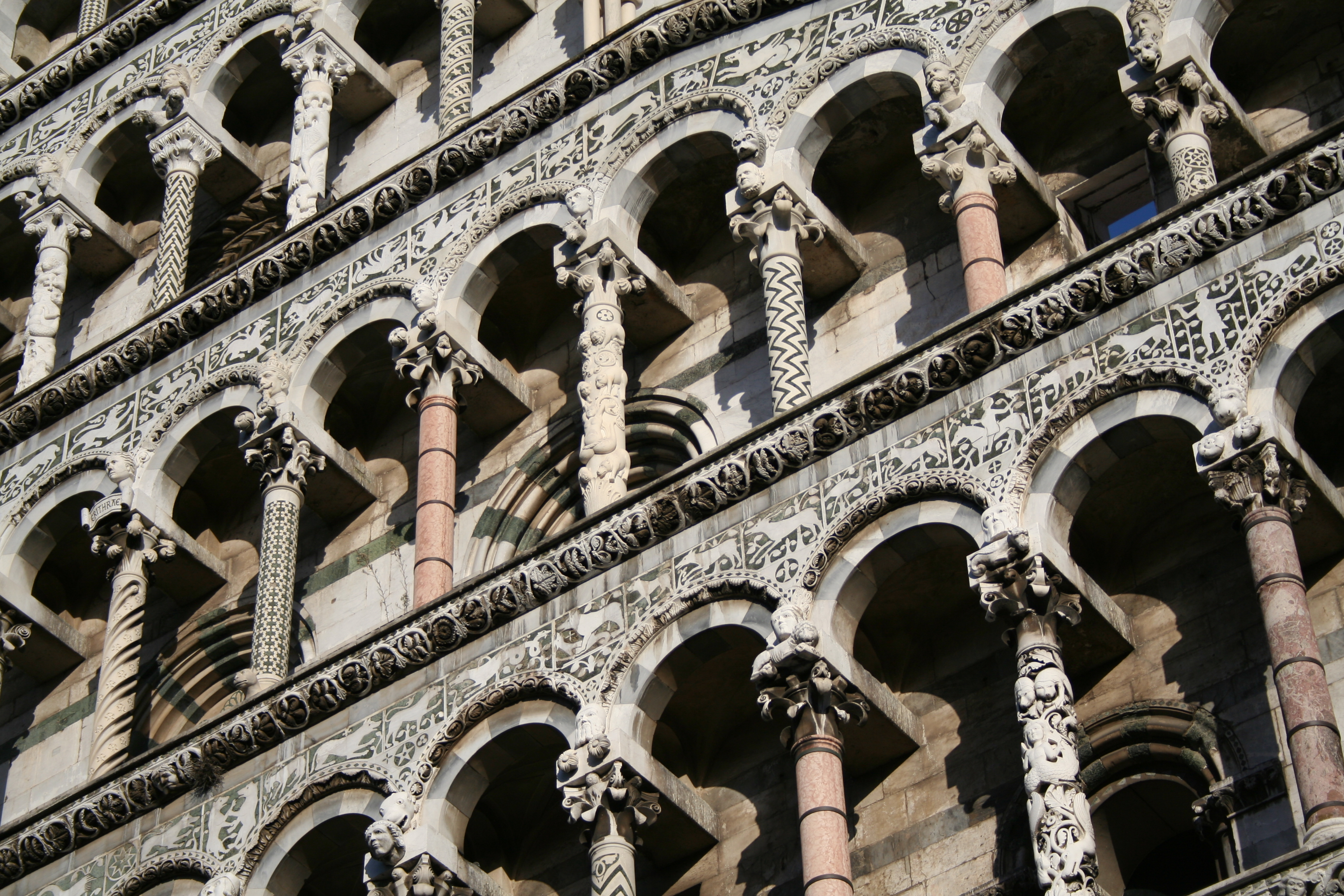
A close up of the front façade

Notable is the façade, from the 13th century, with a large series of sculptures and inlays, numerous of which were remade in the 19th century. There is a description by John Ruskin of the decayed state of that façade, observed during his tour of 1845. The lower part has a series of blind arcades, the central of which includes the main portal. The upper part, built using plenty of iron materials to counter wind, has four orders of small loggias. On the summit, flanked by two other angels, is the 4 m-tall statue of St. Michael the Archangel. According to a legend, an angel's finger would have a huge diamond. On the lower right corner of the façade is a statue (1480) of the Madonna salutis portus, sculpted by Matteo Civitali to celebrate the end of the 1476 plague.

The church interior has a nave and two aisles with transept and semicircular apse; the nave is supported by arcades on monolithic columns. From the southern transept rises the bell tower, built in the 12th-14th centuries, with a series of single, double and triple mullioned windows. The last floor was demolished during the rule of Giovanni dell'Agnello (1364–1368), Doge of Pisa.

== Interior ==
Amongst the artworks in the interior, are a Madonna with Child terracotta by Luca della Robbia and a panel with Four Saints by Filippino Lippi.

=== San Divino Armeno ===
The body of a pilgrim saint, San Divino Armeno, is preserved under the high altar in the church. Born in Armenia around 1000, he embarked on a pilgrimage to Jerusalem and Rome, eventually reaching Lucca in 1050 along the Via Francigena. He died in the city during a stop of the pilgrimage to Santiago de Compostela. He died on June 3, 1050, and was initially buried outside the church. His remains were later moved to the altar inside the church. San Divino was likely declared a saint by Pope Alexander III in 1159. His body is one of Italy's oldest known mummified saints. A 2018 paleopathological study confirmed his death occurred between 1025 and 1124, consistent with historical accounts.

== Gallery ==
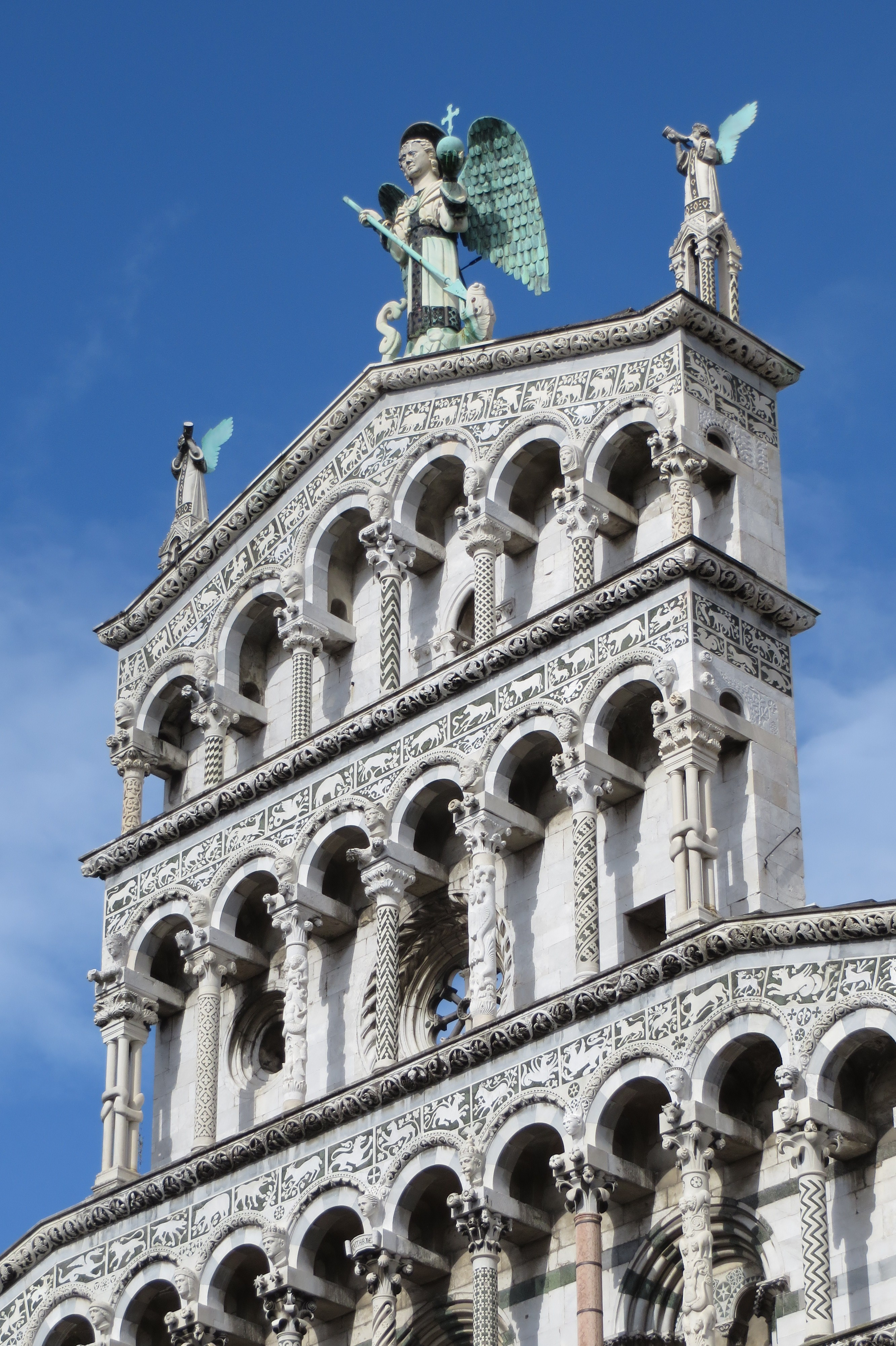

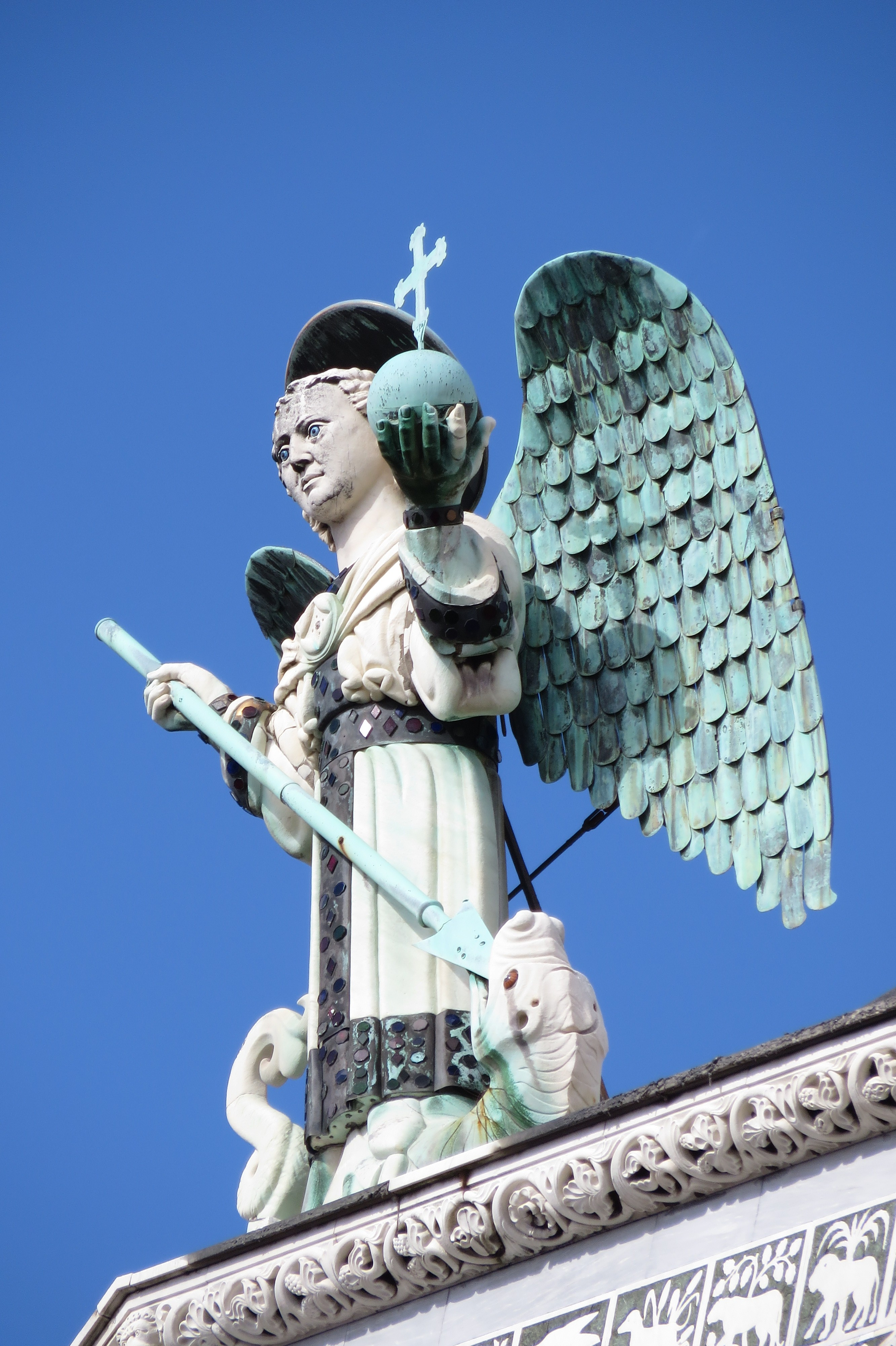

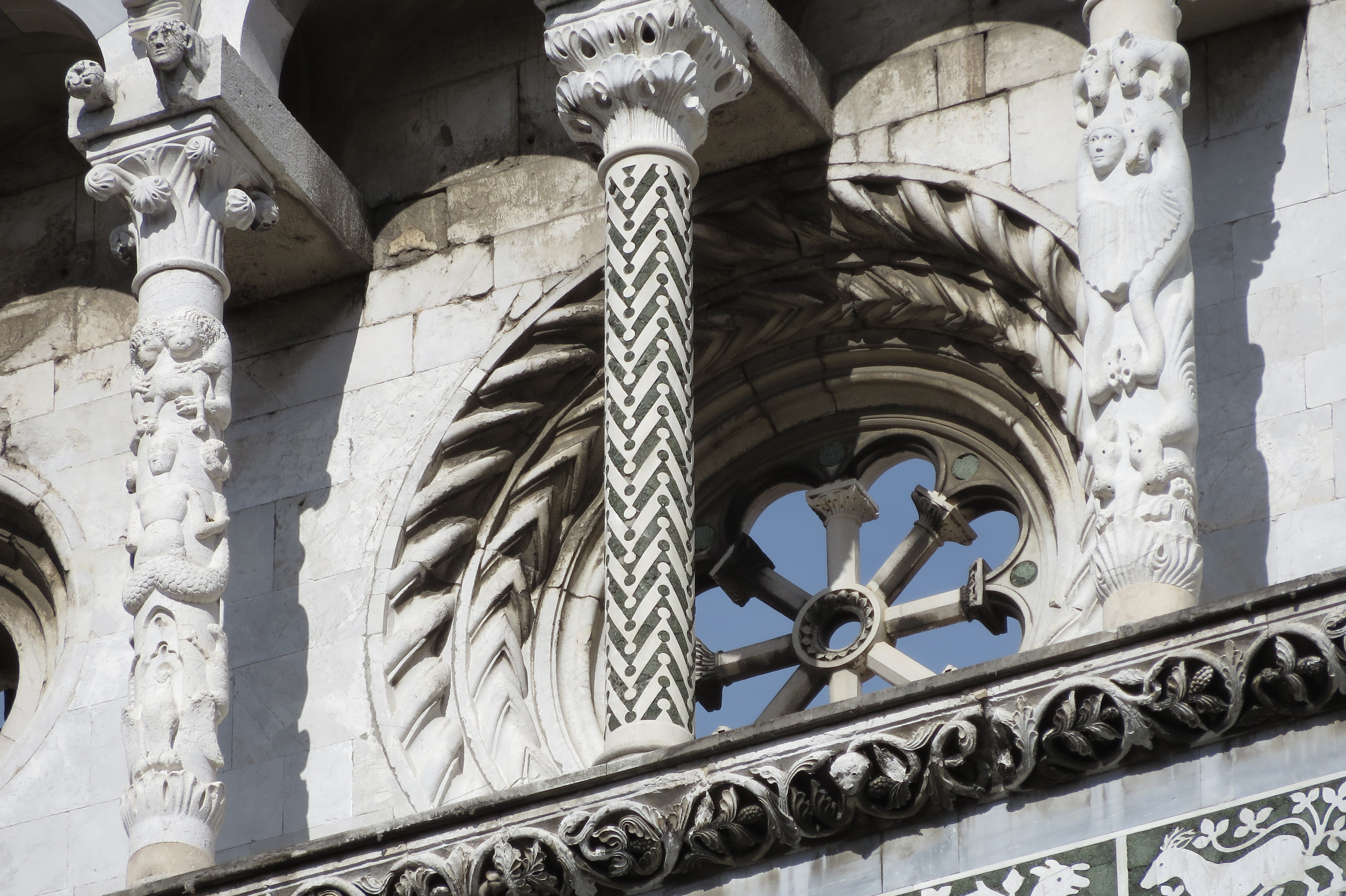

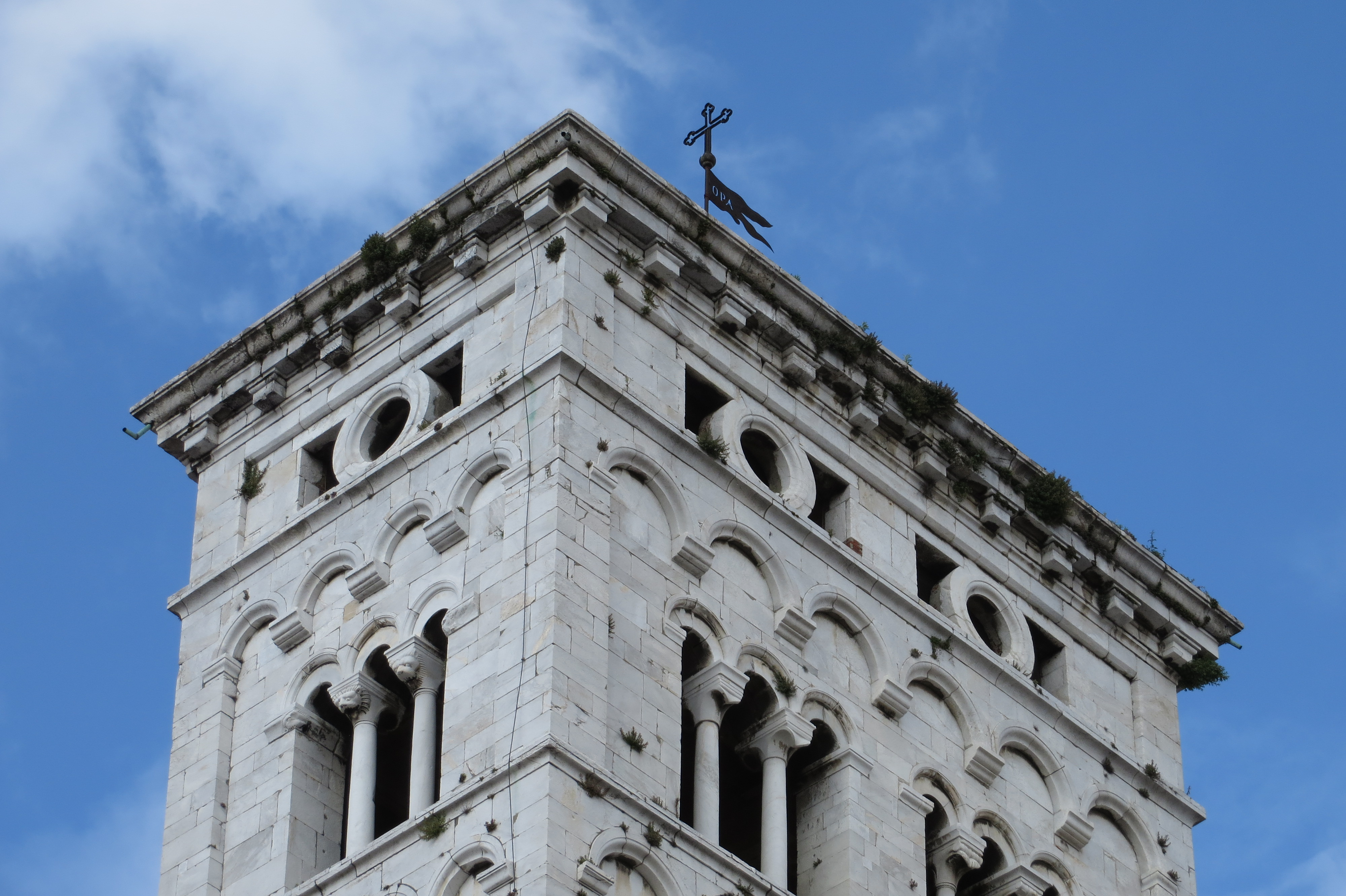

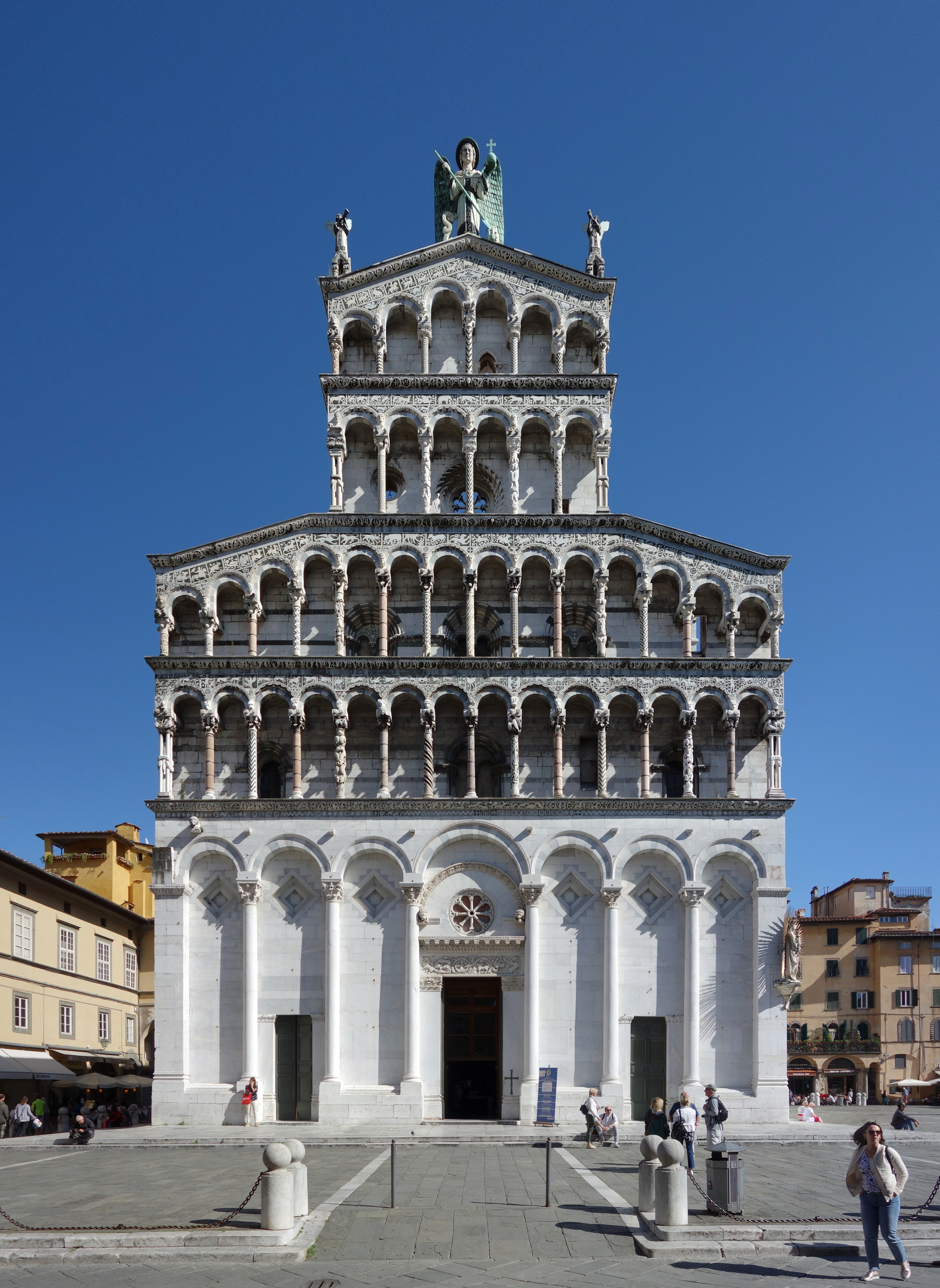

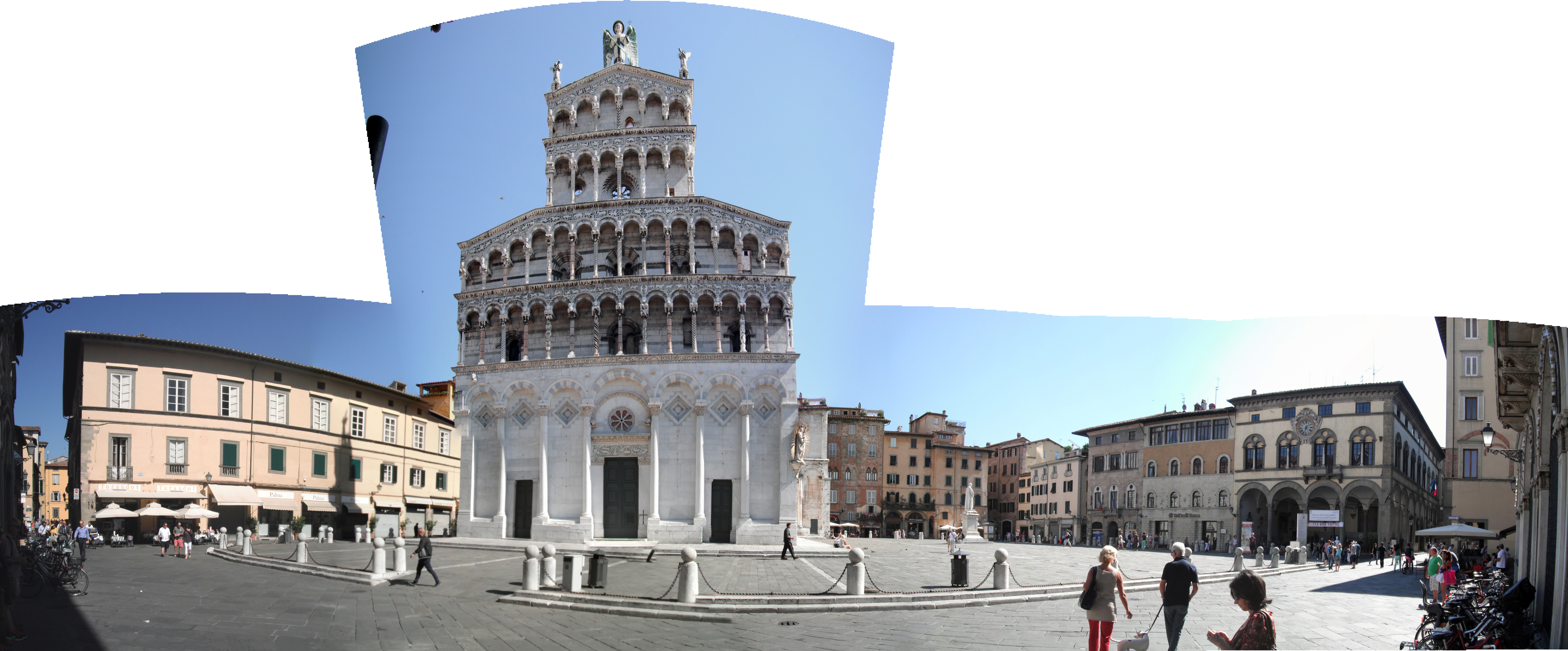

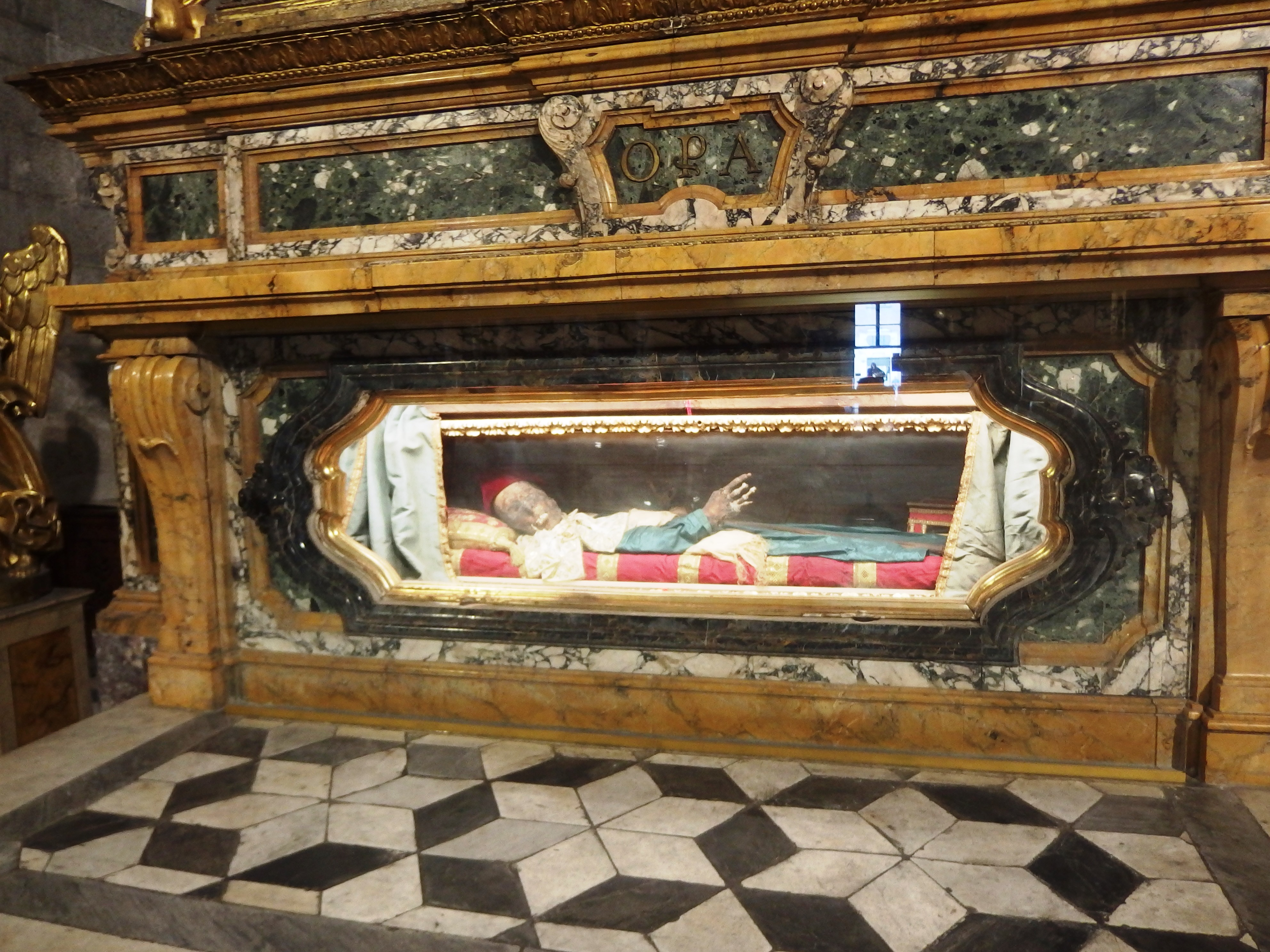

== See also ==
- Romanesque architecture
- Saint Michael (Roman Catholic)
