= Palazzo Loredan Cini =

Coordinates: 45.4311°N 12.3298°E

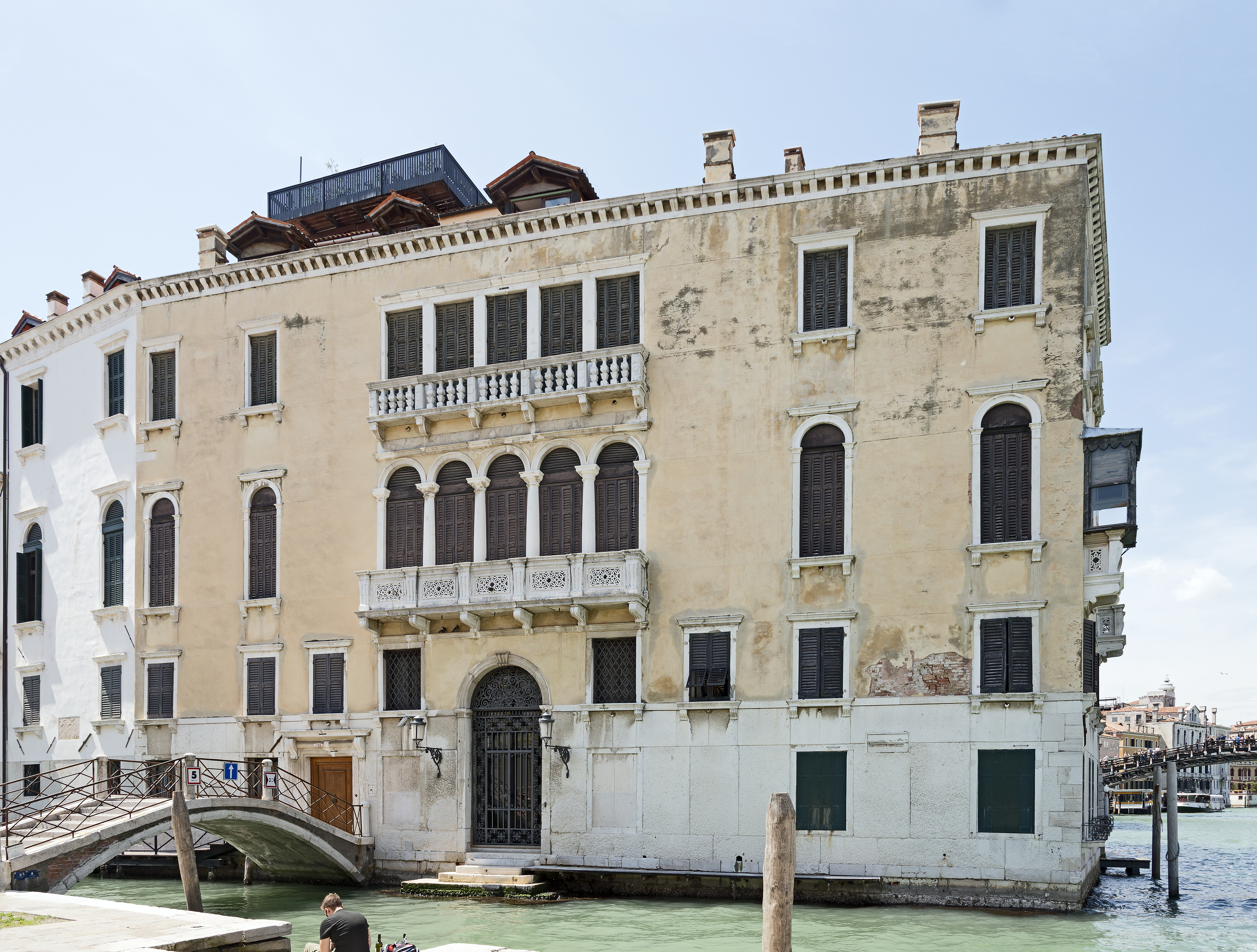
- Rio San Vio Façade with Grand Canal to the right
- Interactive map of the Palazzo Loredan Cini area

General information
- Location: Venice, Italy, Campo San Vio 864, Dorsoduro
- Completed: 14th century

Design and construction
- Developer: Loredan family

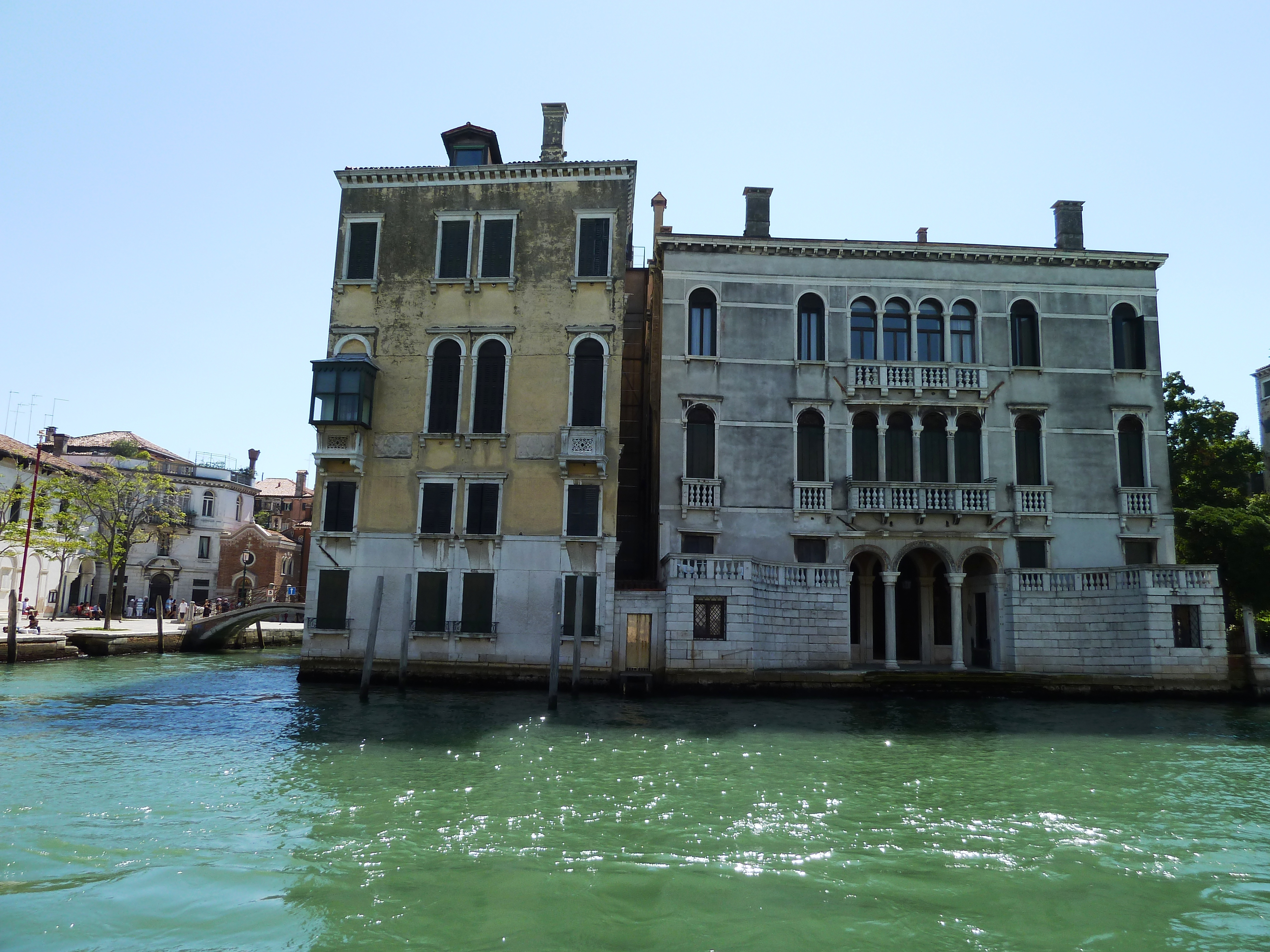
Grand Canal Facade with adjacent Palazzo Balbi Valier

The Palazzo Loredan Cini is a palace located between the Palazzo Balbi Valier and the Rio San Vio on the Grand Canal, in the sestiere of Dorsoduro, Venice, Italy. The palace was formed from the amalgamation of the former Palazzo Foscari-Loredan with the adjacent Palazzo Grimani. The narrow facade on the Canal has no entrance, but the facade to the north on the Rio, has a single water door, and is connected to the adjacent campo by a bridge. The facade is decorated with two poliforas.

== History ==
The Foscari palace, also called Loredan palace, was built on a site belonging to the Giustinian in the 14th-15th centuries. In 1428 it was purchased by the Republic for 6,500 ducats, and transferred to the Marquis of Mantua. A decade later, it was confiscated and given to Francesco Sforza. Nearly a decade later, it was again appropriated and sold by public auction to Doge Francesco Foscari. The Foscari, under Elisabetta Venier Foscari rebuilt it in the mid-1560s. In 1797 the palace was still occupied by descendants of the family, Nicolo Foscari and his brothers. During the Austrian occupation it was used as a barrack for the Croatian soldiers. During the 19th century, it served as the Scuola Superiore di Commercio.

From 1564 to 1567, the Grimani palace had been originally built for Vincenzo, of the Santa Maria Formosa branch of the Grimani family. In the 19th-20th century, it was the residence of Prince Carlos of Bourbon-Two Sicilies.

In 1920, after his marriage to the actress Lyda Borelli, the industrial tycoon Vittorio Cini acquired the Palazzo Foscari on the Grand Canal. He merged it with the adjoining palace. In 1934, under the fascist rule of Mussolini, Cini was named Senator of Italy. Despite the upheavals that occurred at the end of Italy's involvement with the Axis in World War II, Cini remained a major collector of Italian art. After Vittorio's son Giorgio died in 1949, he created in 1951 the Giorgio Cini Foundation, based on the island of San Giorgio Maggiore. This foundation was engaged in the protection, patronage, and research regarding cultural and artistic legacy of Venice.

From 1956 to 1958, the architect Tomaso Buzzi was commissioned to redesign the interior of the palace. Vittorio Cini died in 1977. In 1984, his daughter, Yana Cini Alliata di Montereale, donated his collections to the Palazzo Cini Gallery, under the ownership by the Fondazione Giorgio Cini.

The collection of artworks, including porcelain and ivories, was increased when the Cini Guglielmi di Vulci heirs permanently loaned a large collection of Ferrarese paintings. Among the works on permanent display in the first floor of the palace are:

- St George, from the Colonna altarpiece by Cosmè Tura
- Virgin and Child with Saints Nicholas, Jerome, Augustine and Christopher, by Michele Pannonio
- Saints George, Catherine of Alexandria, and Jerome, panels from Griffoni Polyptych, once in church of San Petronio of Bologna,
- Madonna and Child, by follower of Giovanni Francesco Maineri
- St John the Baptist in the Wilderness, by Marco Zoppo
- Portrait of Tito Vespasiano Strozzi, by Baldassarre D’Este
- Virgin and Child, by Lorenzo Costa
- Allegorical Scene from bedroom of Alfonso I in the Estense Castle, painted by Dosso Dossi
- Holy Family and Young Saint John, by Battista Dossi
- Pietà, Circumcision, and Presentation at the Temple, by Ludovico Mazzolino
- Adoration by Shepherds, by Michele Ciampanti
- Holy Family with St John the Baptist, by Piero di Cosimo
- Virgin and Child, by Niccolò di Segna
- St John the Evangelist Drinks from Poisoned Cup and Assumption of Saint, by Taddeo Gaddi
- Crucifixion by Bernardo Daddi
- Virgin and Child Enthroned with Saints, by the studio of Bernardo Daddi
- The Ascension of Christ by Guariento
- Virgin and Child, polychrome wood by Nino Pisano
- Virgin and Child with Saints, Angels and Donor, by Filippo Lippi
- St Thomas Aquinas, by Fra Angelico
- Madonna and Child, by Piero della Francesca
- Judgement of Paris, by Sandro Botticelli and studio
- Virgin Adoring the Child with Two Angels, by Domenico Ghirlandaio and Sebastiano Mainardi
- Virgin and Child with Two Angels, by Piero di Cosimo
- Portrait of Two Friends, by Pontormo
- Virgin and Child in polychrome terracotta, by Giovanni De Fondulis
- Virgin and Child by the Master of the Bigallo Crucifix
- Two Apostles by studio of Giotto
- Virgin and Child Enthroned with Two Saints, by Master of the Horne Triptych (Gaddo Gaddi)
- Maestà by Master of Badia a Isola
- Christ Mocked, Flagellation, and Crucifixion, by the Master of the Poldi Pezzoli Diptych
