= San Romano, Lucca =

Deconsecrated Roman Catholic Church in Lucca, Italy

Coordinates: 44.0171°N 10.4967°E

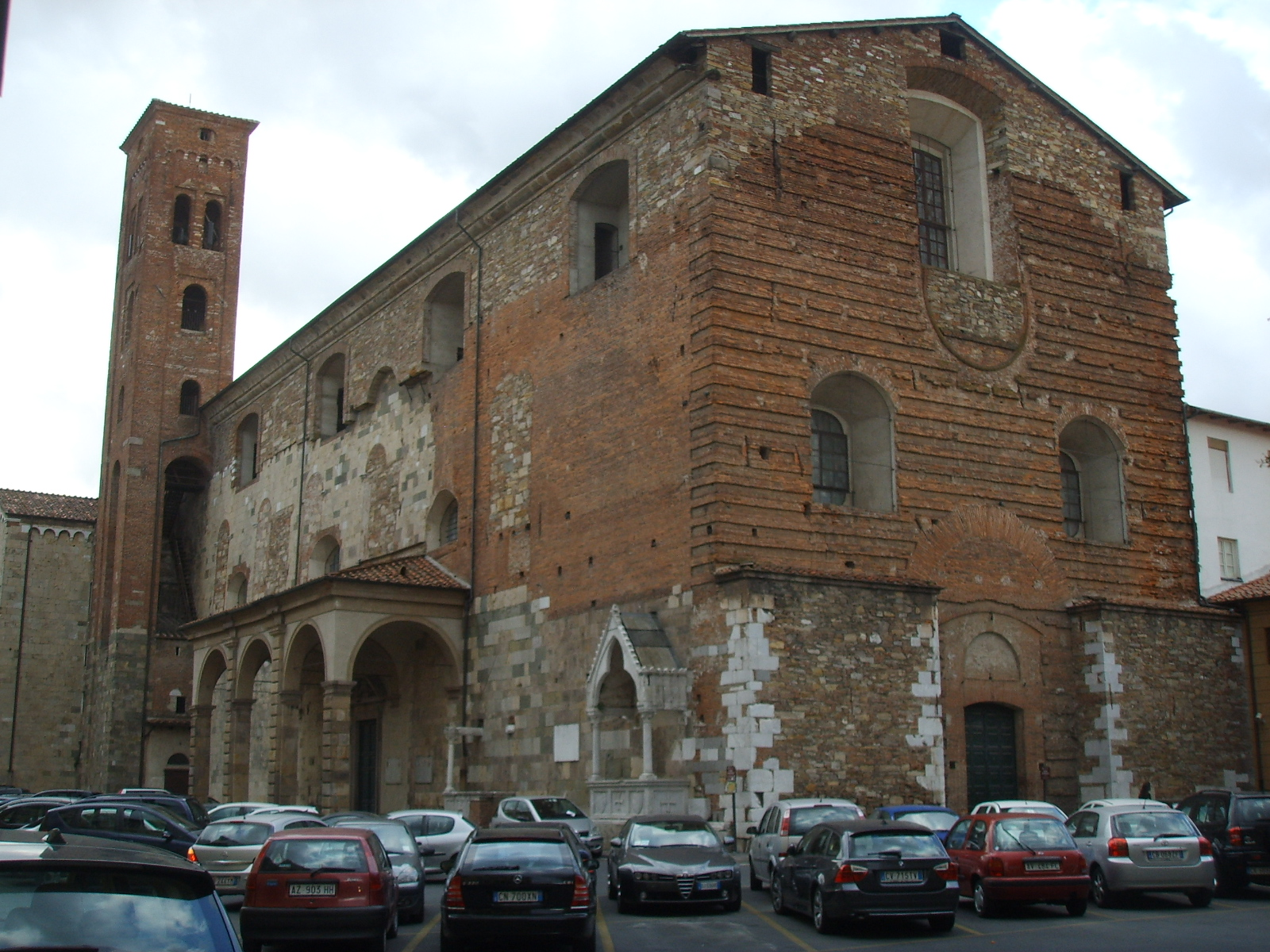
Church of san romano, lucca

San Romano is a deconsecrated Roman Catholic Church located on Piazza San Romano in the center of Lucca, region of Tuscany, Italy. It stands adjacent to the Ducal Palace of Lucca.

== History ==
The church was erected by the Dominican order in the second half of the 13th century with bricks from the razed Augusta fortress. The exterior remains unfinished. Inside is the tomb of San Romano, built in 1490 by Matteo Civitali. The church once held altarpieces by Fra Bartolomeo. The elegantly decorated interior was refurbished in 1635 by the architect Vincenzo Buonamici. The nave is presently used as an auditorium.

A 1877 survey from Ridolfi's Guide to Lucca noted among the artworks in the church was a canvas depicting a Miracle by St Stanislao allowing dead man to speak by Domenico Viola in the third altar on the right. In the chapel adjacent to the sacristy was a painting depicting the Miracle of St Raimondi crossing the river on his mantle by Pietro Paolini and an Assumption of the Virgin by Guidotti. In the choir were three painting by Domenico Lombardi, including the Martyrdom of St Romano and Episodes in the life of the Blessed Bernardo Tolomei including a miracle resuscitating a mason. These were moved in 1873 to the former Olivetan church of San Ponziano. The apse of the church had a marble tomb monument dedicated to San Romano, by Matteo Civitali. On the chapels near the apse are painting depicting the Circumcision of Christ (1535) by Rutilio Manetti and depictions of St Peter and St Sixtus, pope, by Domenico Lombardi. Another chapel had a Virgin of the Misericodia by Fra Bartolommeo and a Virgin of the Rosary and Saints by Giorgio Vasari.

On the second altar on the left side of the nave was a St Hyacinth, dominican priest, resurrects a boy by Domenico Passignani. The next altars had a Crucifixion and Thomas Acquinas by Vanni and another altarpiece by Fra Bartolommeo, now in pinacodeca. The Descent of the Holy Spirit among the Apostles (1636) had been painted by Andrea Coppola.
