= San Giovannino dei Cavalieri =

Church building in Florence, Italy

Coordinates: 43°46′47.23″N 11°15′30.83″E

Church of Saint John the Baptist of the Knights (Chiesa di San Giovannino dei Cavalieri)
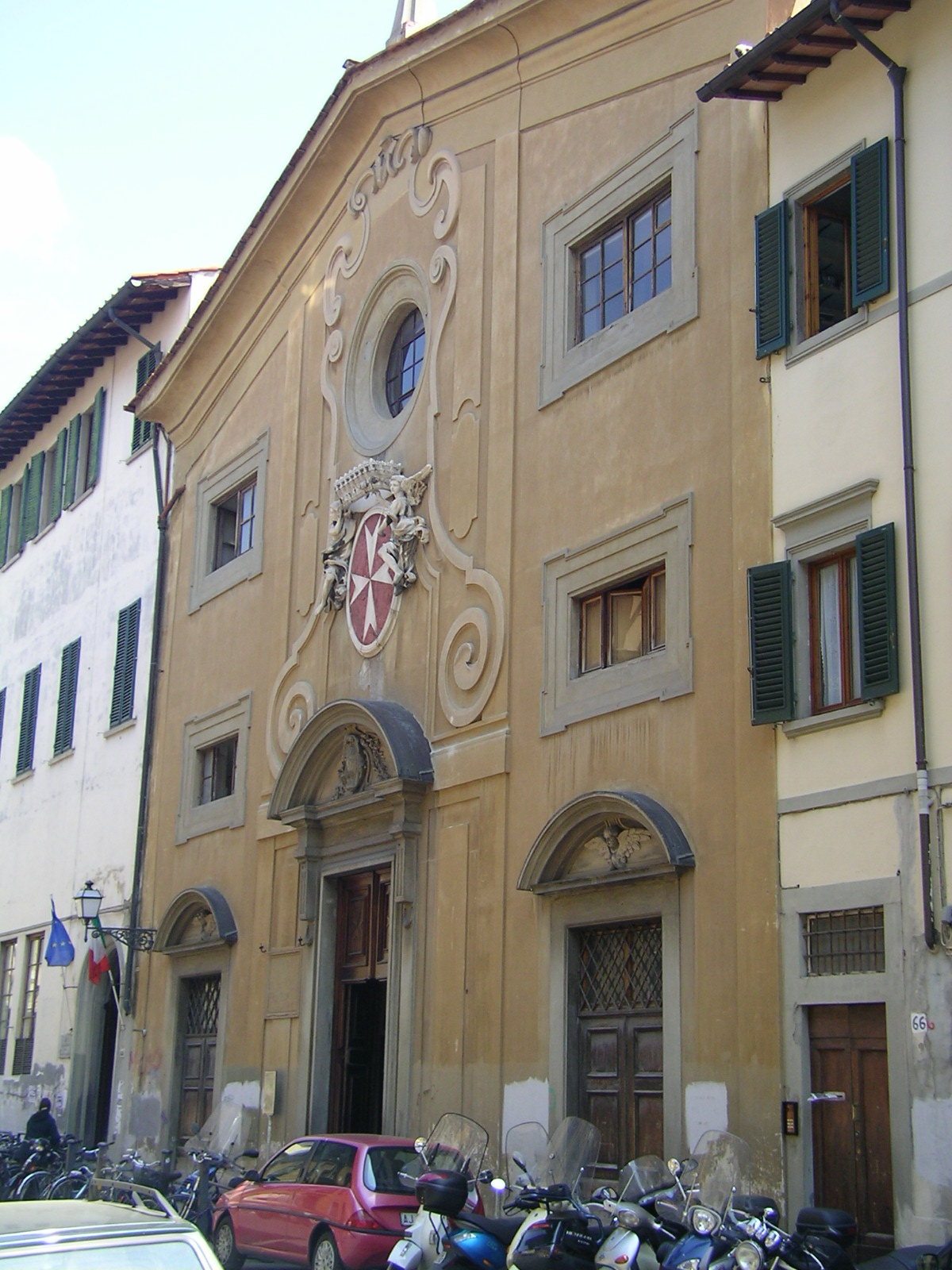
- Façade of the church.

Religion
- Affiliation: Roman Catholic
- Province: Florence

Location
- Location: Florence, Italy
- Interactive map of Church of Saint John the Baptist of the Knights (Chiesa di San Giovannino dei Cavalieri)

Architecture
- Type: Church
- Groundbreaking: 1553
- Completed: 1784

San Giovannino dei Cavalieri (Young St. John the Baptist of the Knights) previously named Church of San Giovanni Decollato (Decapitated St. John), is a parish church situated in Via San Gallo in central Florence, Italy.

Initially the site held a 14th-century home for women of "easy virtue" and dedicated to St. Mary Magdalen, it was renamed after the patron saint of the Cavalieri or Knights of Malta. Rebuilt from 1553-1784, with facade added in 1699. Presently it contains a Coronation of the Virgin by Neri di Bicci, a Nativity by Bicci di Lorenzo, an Annunciation attributed to the Master of Stratonice, a Decapitation of St. John the Baptist by Pietro Dandini, vault frescoes by Alessandro Gherardini, a painted cross in the apse by Lorenzo Monaco, and a Last Supper by Palma il Giovane.
