= San Cristoforo, Lucca =

Church building in Lucca, Italy

Coordinates: 43.842934°N 10.504123°E

San Cristoforo is a Romanesque and Gothic-style, former Roman Catholic church located on the narrow Via Fillungo in the center of Lucca, region of Tuscany, Italy. Now deconsecrated and stripped of its former interior altars and decoration, the chapel served as a memorial for those fallen in the wars..

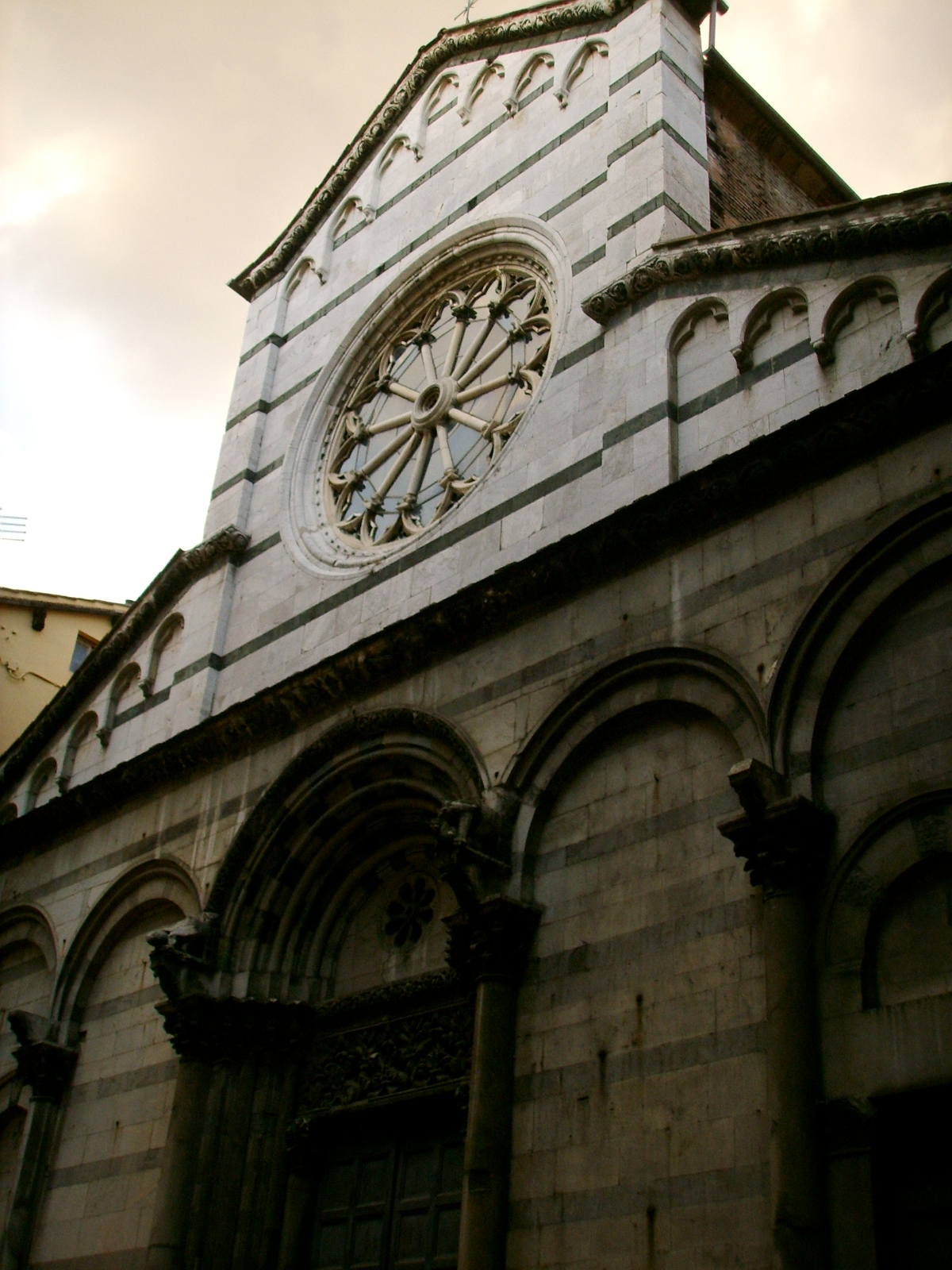
Facade with rose window.

== History ==
A church at the site is documented since 1053. The architect of much of the structure is attributed to Diotisalvi. The façade has a pattern of alternating white and dark stone, influenced by the style of churches in Pisa. The lower part of the façade dates to 12th-century while the superior façade with a rose window to the 14th-century.

In 1939 to 1940, much of the interior decoration was stripped, the church deconsecrated, and it was made as a chapel to recall those fallen in the Second World War. The names of the dead were engraved on the nave walls. The former church is now used for cultural events.
