= Baldassarre di Biagio =

Italian painter

Baldassarre di Biagio, also called Baldassarre di Biagio del Firenze or the Master of the Benabbio Triptych, (1430/1434–1484) was an Italian painter of the high Renaissance period.

For many years, he was an unidentified artist known only for his triptych in the Santa Maria Assunta in Benabbio, Italy. In 1978, Massimo Ferretti defined the works and career of the artist, including an altarpiece he collaborated with Matteo Civitali for the Church of San Michele di Antraccoli.

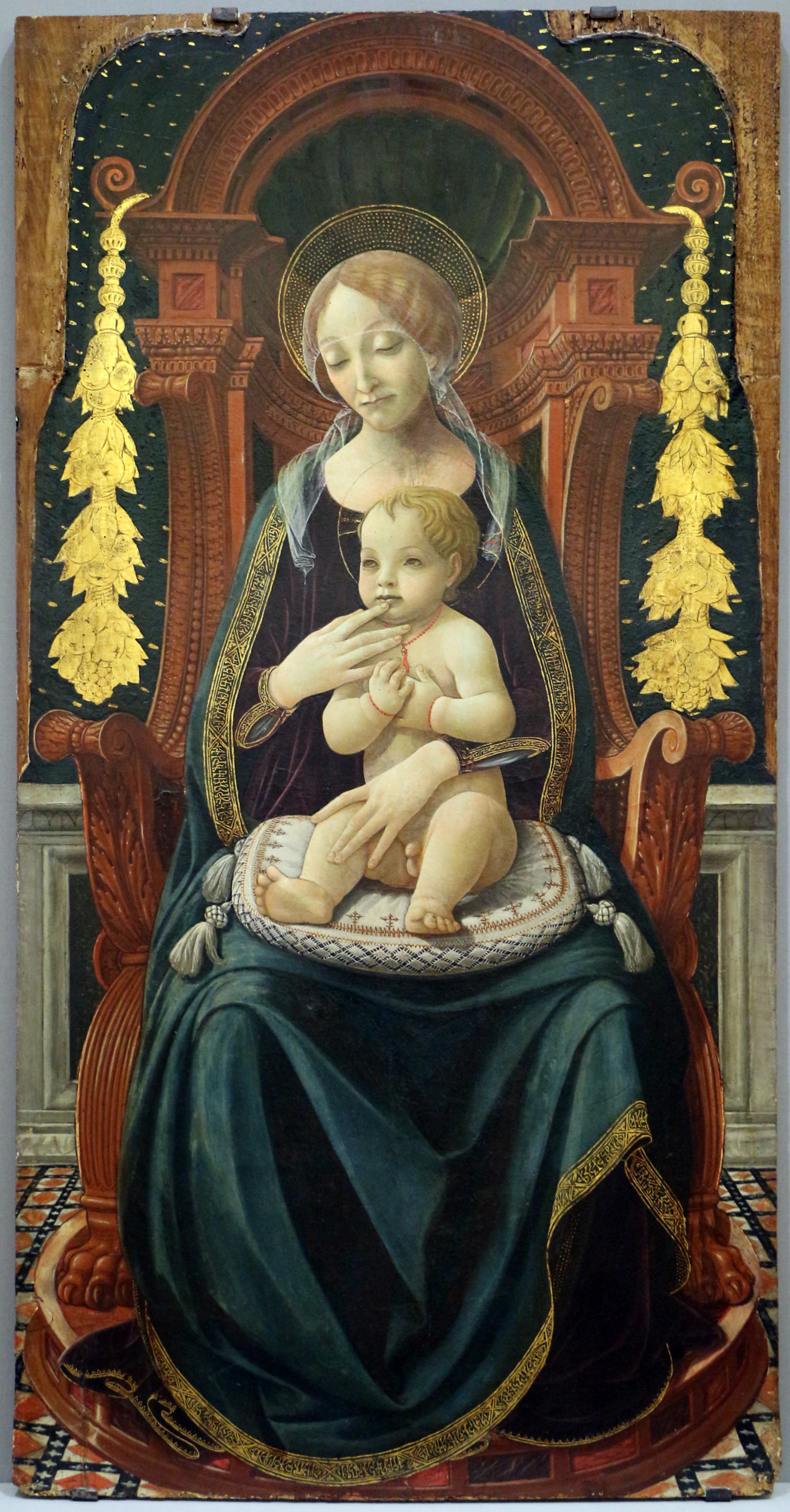
Enthroned Madonna and Child, after 1480.

== Biography ==
Not much is known about Di Biagio's life except through his works. He was born in Florence, and his style puts him in the Florentine School, but he was active mainly in Lucca. He primarily painted sacred subjects for local church commissions. He died in 1484. One of his works, Madonna and Child, is part of the Abbotsford House collection. He has also assigned frescoes found in the church of San Francesco in Lucca, depicting Scenes from the Life of Mary. The style appears to be influenced by Filippo Lippi.
