= San Martino, Pietrasanta =

Collegiate church in Pietrasanta, Tuscany, Italy

Coordinates: 43.9667°N 10.2333°E

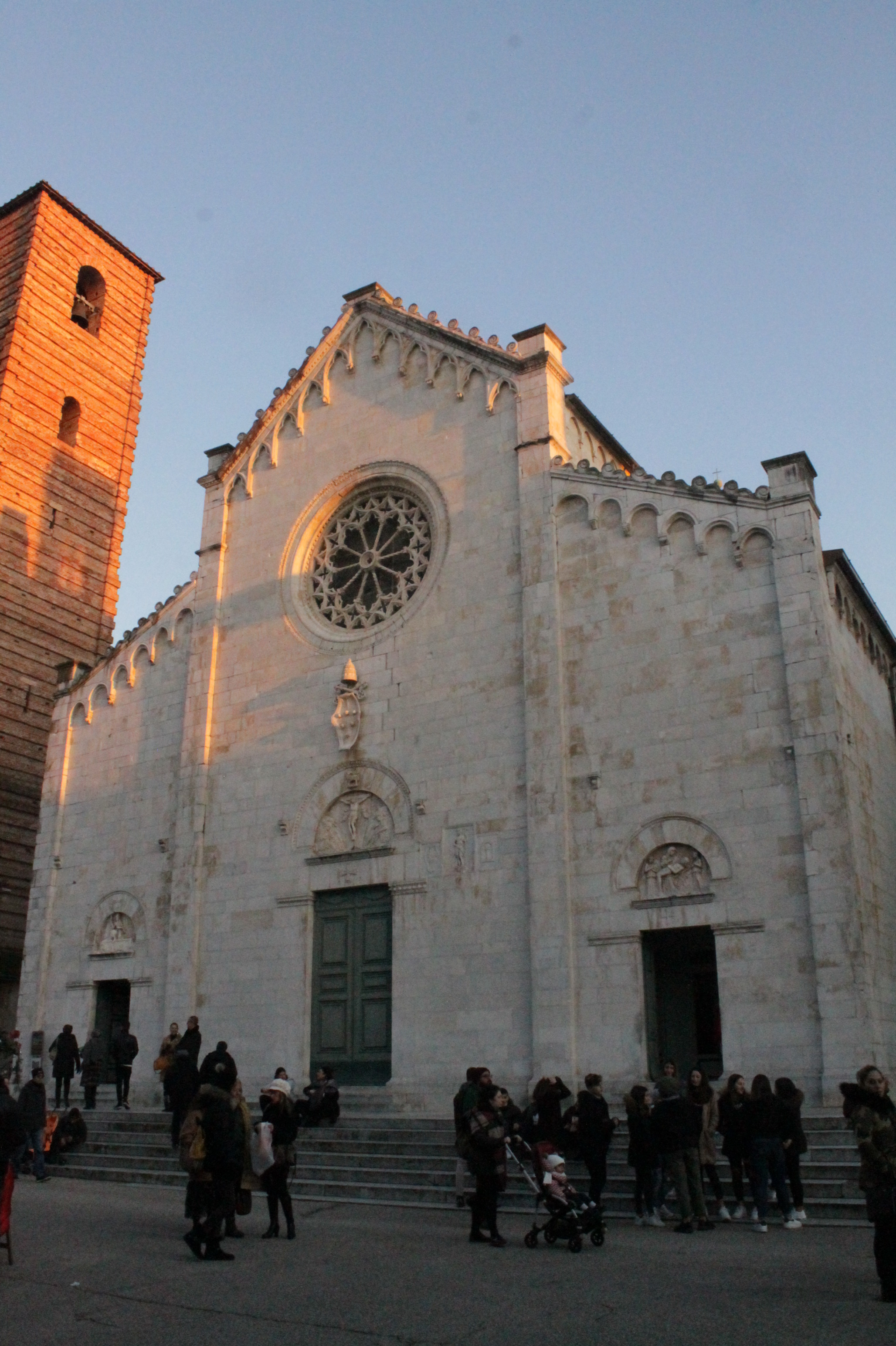
The Cathedral Church of St Martin, Pietrasanta

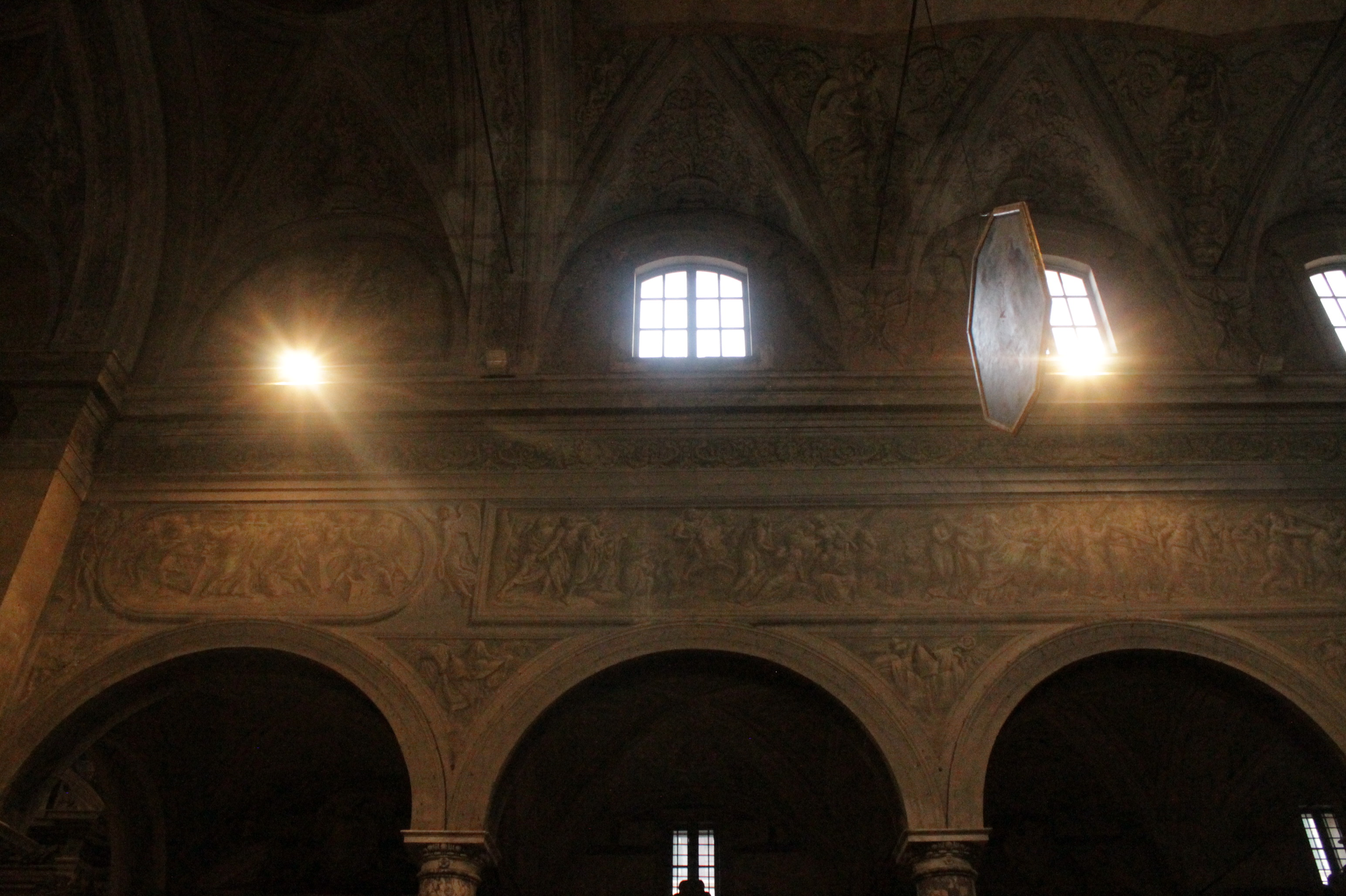
Interior, St Martin's Cathedral, Pietrasanta

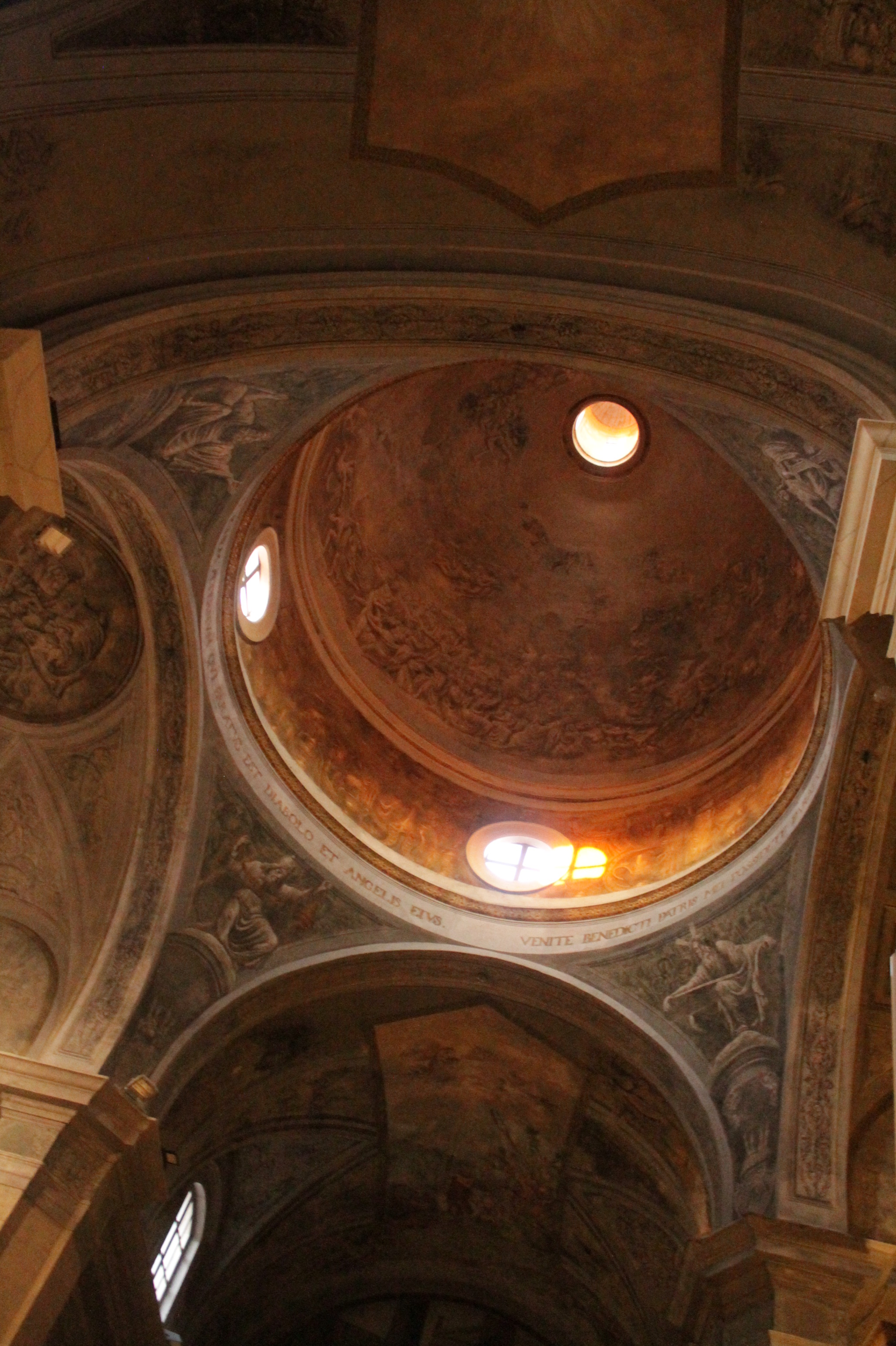
Interior of the dome, Pietrasanta Cathedral

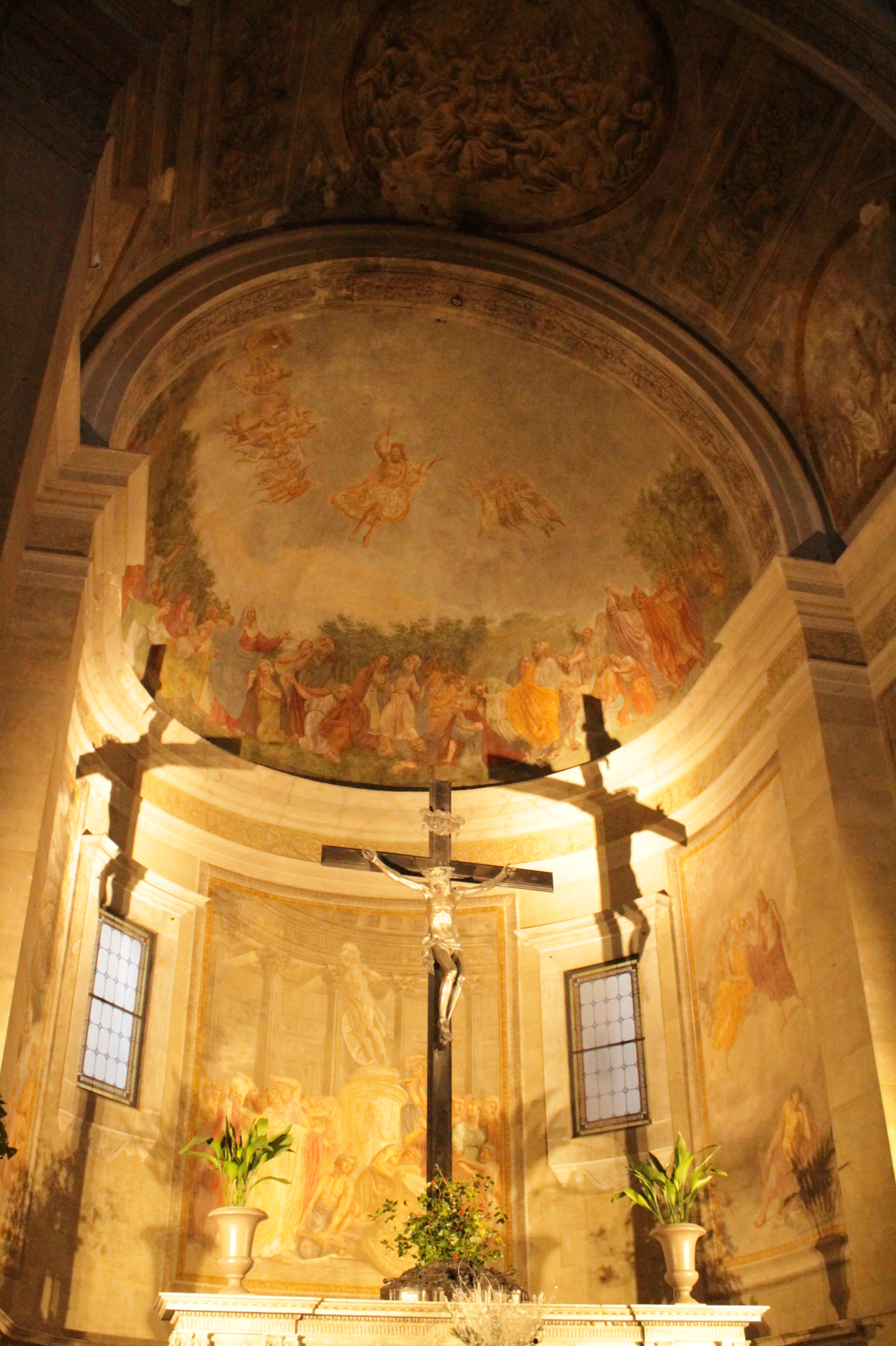
Apse and crucifix at Pietrasanta Cathedral

The Collegiate Church of San Martino (Italian: Collegiata di San Martino; Duomo di Pietrasanta) is a collegiate church in Pietrasanta, in the region of Tuscany, Italy. It is the main church or duomo of the town. It is first mentioned in 1223, and was subsequently enlarged in 1330 and in 1387 when Pope Urban VI had a baptismal font installed in the church.

== Exterior ==
The façade is covered with white marble. Over the three portals are lunettes with scenes of the Life of Christ. On the right transept is another portal with St. John the Baptist, a 14th-century work by Bonuccio Pardini. The coat of arms on the main façade is a memory of the Genoese and Florentine dominations, but there is also one of Pope Leo X. The marble rose window is attributed to Riccomanno Riccomanni (14th century).

The 36 m-tall bell tower has square layout, and remains unclad and in brick, originally it was meant be covered with marble facing. It was finished in the late 15th-early 16th centuries by the Florentine architect Donato Benti. In the interior is a curious helicoidal staircase.

The baptistery (1786) was originally a 17th-century oratory dedicated to St. Hyacinth. It contains two baptismal fonts from 1385 and 1612.

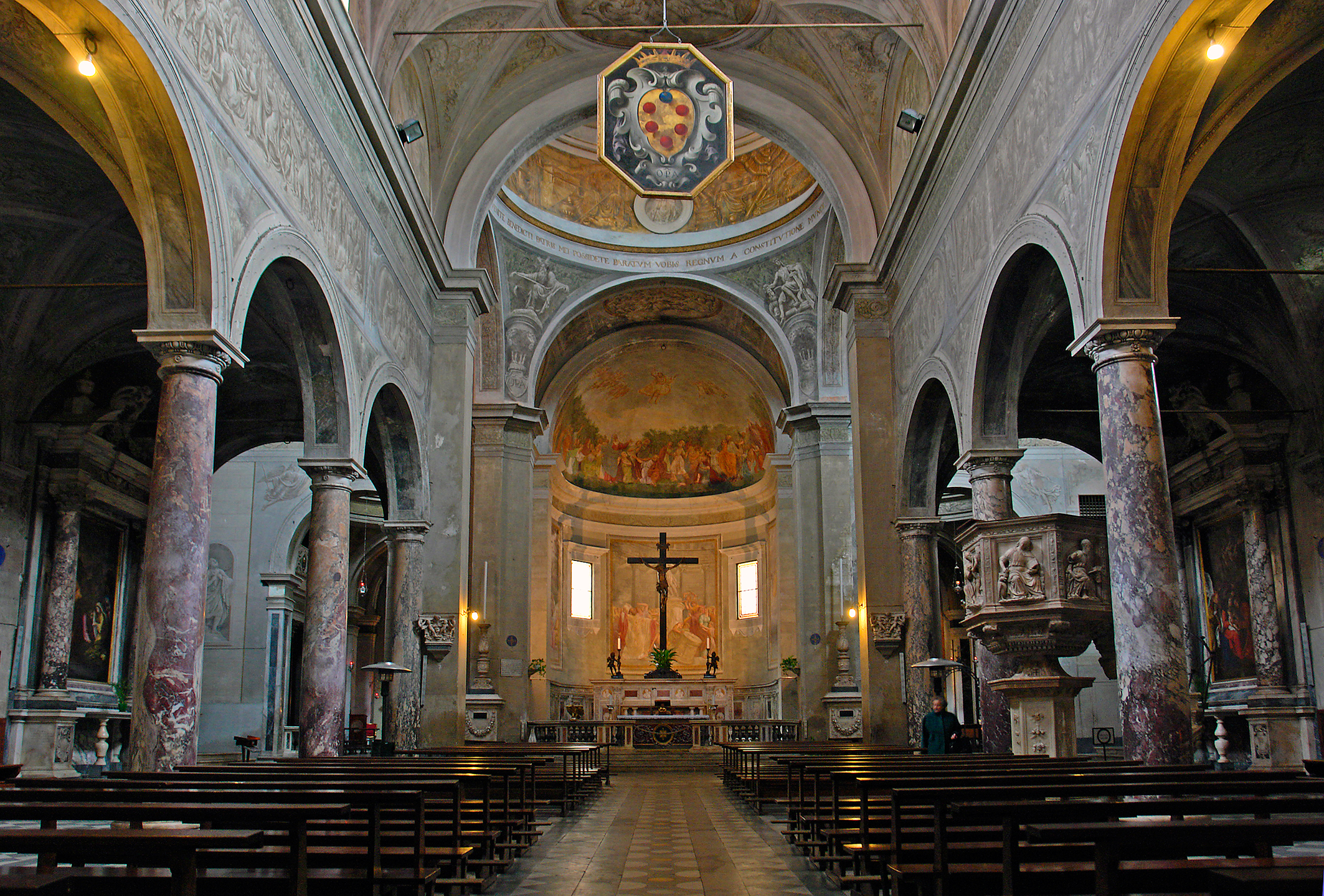
The nave.

The Piazza in front of the Cathedral has various monuments including a statue depicting Grand Duke Leopold, the Hapsburg ruler of Tuscany, sculpted by Vincenzo Santini. There is also a marble column of the Marzocco (The seated lion symbolizing Florence), celebrating the re-acquisition in 1513 of the town by Florence. The fountains on surrounding walls are also known as the Fontana del Marzocco.

== Interior ==
The church is on the Latin cross plan with a nave, two aisles and a transept. Much of the decoration dates from the reign of Christina, Grand Duchess of Tuscany, who in 1627 commissioned the restoration of the Collegiata to Florentine artists, who provided large devotional altarpieces and sculptures. The tribune has frescoes (1496) by Antonio di Francesco Cosi and by Ciampanti from Lucca. Other artists include painters Matteo Rosselli, Francesco Curradi, Jacopo Vignali, Pietro Dandini, Bastiano Bitozzi, Jacopo Chiavistelli, and Alessandro Cominotti, and the sculptors Giovan Battista Stagi, Stagio Stagi and Ferdinando Tacca.

The marble pulpit is instead from 1508, by Benti and Lorenzo Stagi. The dome was originally octagonal (1453), but was rebuilt on circular plan in 1820. The ceiling of the dome was frescoed with a depiction of the Last Judgement (1823–1825) by Luigi Ademollo.

In the right transept chapel is the venerated relic of the Madonna del Sole ("Madonna of the Sun"), a painting from an anonymous Late Gothic artist, dated 1424.
