= Scotton =

Scotton can refer to:

== Places in England ==
- Scotton, Lincolnshire, near Gainsborough, Lincolnshire.
- Scotton, Richmondshire, near Catterick, Richmondshire, North Yorkshire.
- Scotton, Harrogate, near Knaresborough, Harrogate, North Yorkshire.

== Surname ==
- Edward Scotton, MP for Devizes 1656-1660
- William Scotton (1856–1893), Nottinghamshire cricketer

== See also ==
- Scotto, a name
- Scottown (disambiguation)
