= Scottown =

Scottown may refer to:

- Scottown, Ohio, unincorporated community in Ohio (USA)
- Scottown, Florida, small unincorporated community in Florida
- Scottown Covered Bridge

== See also ==
- Scotstown (disambiguation)
- Scotto, a name
- Scotton (disambiguation)
- Scottow, Norfolk, England
