= Scotto =

Scotto is a given name and a surname (the patronymic is Scotti), generally Italian. Notable people with the surname include:

- Scotto, 13th-century troubadour
- Anthony M. Scotto (1934-2021), American mobster
- Aubrey Scotto (1895–1953), American film director
- Carolina Scotto (born 1958), Argentine educator
- Daniel Scotto (1952–2018), American financial analyst
- Darío Scotto (born 1969), Argentine retired footballer
- Emilio Scotto (born 1954), Argentine motorcycle rider
- Girolamo Scotto (c. 1505–1572), Venetian music printer and composer
- Renata Scotto (1934–2023), Italian soprano
- Rosanna Scotto (born 1958), American news anchor
- Vincent Scotto (1876–1952), French composer

It is also the nickname of:

- Scott McTominay, Scottish footballer

== See also ==
- Scotton
- Scottown
