= Pellegrino Tomeoni =

Italian composer

Pellegrino Tomeoni (c.1721, in Lucca – c.1816, in Lucca) was an Italian composer and organist.

== Life ==
Pellegrino studied in Naples and returned to his native Lucca in 1748 where he was involved with the Teatro Tasche. He was subsequently maestro di cappella at the collegiate church in Camaiore (1750 1778), at St. Michele in Foro in Lucca (1779 1785) and at the collegiate church in Pietrasanta (1785 1816). His son Florindo (1755–1820) was also a composer. His daughter Irene Tomeoni (Dutillieu) (1763–1830) was an Italian soprano. She performed in Vienna in the 1790s and beyond. On December 18, 1795, she performed in a concert produced by Joseph Haydn (1732-1809) which also featured newcomer Ludwig van Beethoven (1770-1827). According to Theodore Albrecht, a Beethoven historian, Hayden sold tickets from his third floor apartment.

== Compositions ==
=== Operas ===
- Dione siracusano, (Lucca 1750)
- Il Narsete, generale di Giustiniano imperatore, (Lucca 1770)
- Marzio Coriolano, (Lucca 1773)

=== Sacred works ===
- Magnificat - G major; V (4), Coro, bc, (D-MÜs)
- Mass - C major; V (3), Coro, orch, (US-LOu)
- Mass (I-Ls)
- Mass sections and psalms, 4–8vv, (I-Ls)
- Magnificat, 8vv, (I-Ls)
- motets, (I-Ls)
- Beatus vir - F major; V (4), Coro, bc, (D-MÜs)
- Confitebor - G major; V (4), Coro, bc, (D-MÜs)
- Credidi - A minor; V (4), Coro, bc, (D-MÜs)
- Dixit Dominus - A major; Coro (2), bc, (D-MÜs)
- Dixit Dominus - C major; V (4), Coro, bc, (D-MÜs)
- Domine ad adjuvandum - C major; V (4), Coro, bc, (D-MÜs)
- Domine ad adjuvandum - D major; Coro (2), bc, (D-MÜs)
- Domine probasti me - D minor; V (4), Coro, bc, (D-MÜs)
- In convertendo - C major; V (4), Coro, bc, (D-MÜs)
- In exitu Israel - G major; V (4), Coro, bc, (D-MÜs)
- La Confession - V, pf, (D-MÜs)
- Laetatus sum - F major; V (4), Coro, bc, (D-MÜs)
- Lauda Jerusalem - D major; V (4), Coro (ad lib.?), bc, (D-MÜs)
- Lauda Jerusalem - E minor; V (4), Coro, bc, (D-MÜs)
- Laudate pueri - D major; V (4), Coro, bc, (D-MÜs)
- Nisi Dominus - C major; V (4), Coro, bc, (D-MÜs)

=== Instrumental ===
- Toccatas, org (La Verna Library)

=== Theoretical works ===
- Regole pratiche per accompagnare il basso continuo, esposte in dialoghi per facilitare il possesso alla principiante gioventù (Florence, 1795)

== Sources ==
- RISM: Results of advanced search done for "Tomeoni, Pellegrino" at RISM (Répertoire International des Sources Musicales).
- M. Duella : Musiche per organo del Settecento lucchese (Brescia, 1986)
- James L. Jackman / Gabriella Biagi Ravenni : Tomeoni, Pellegrino in The New Grove Dictionary of Music and Musicians.
