= Lucca =

City and comune in Tuscany, Italy

- Comune
- Comune di Lucca
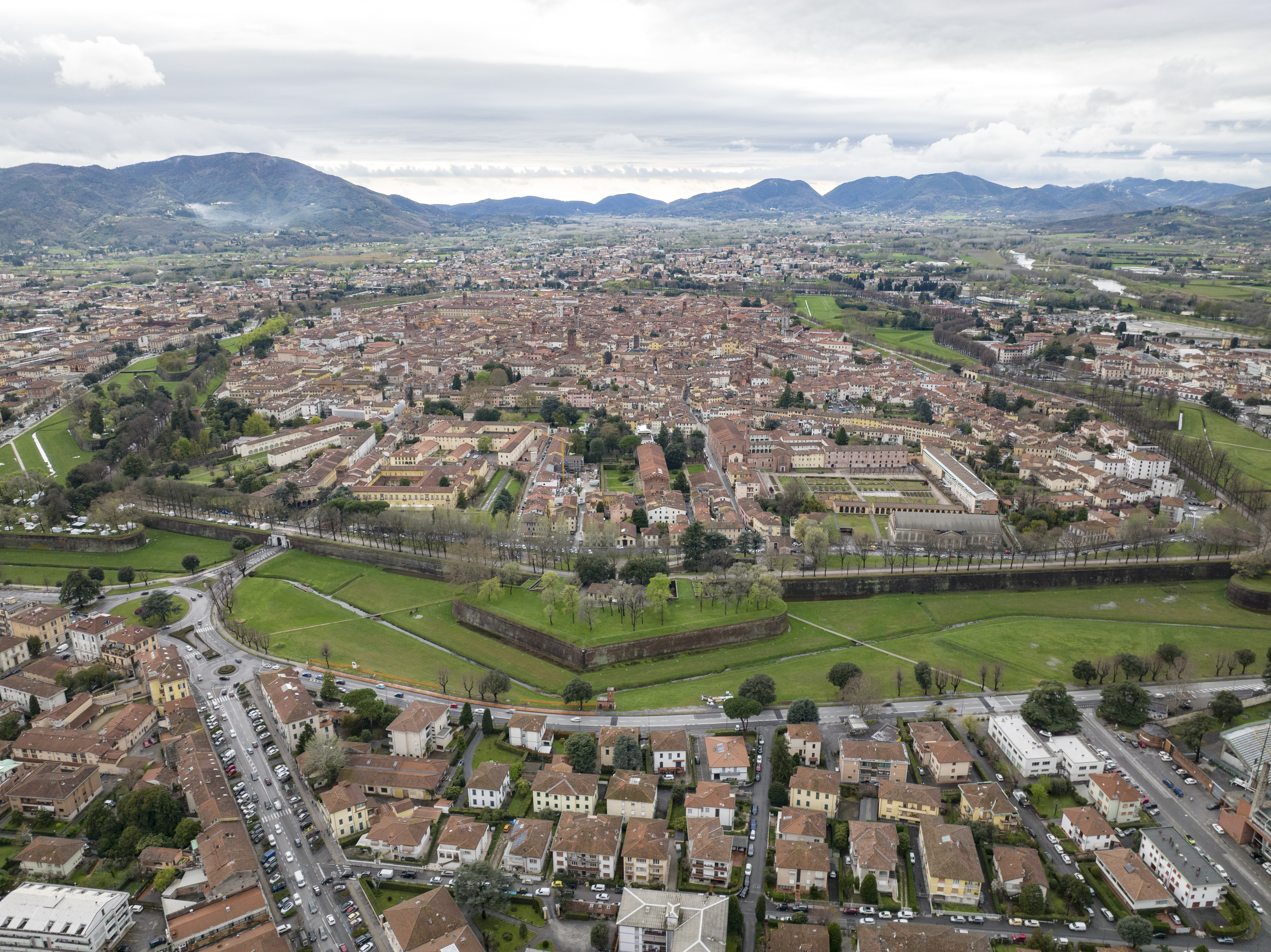
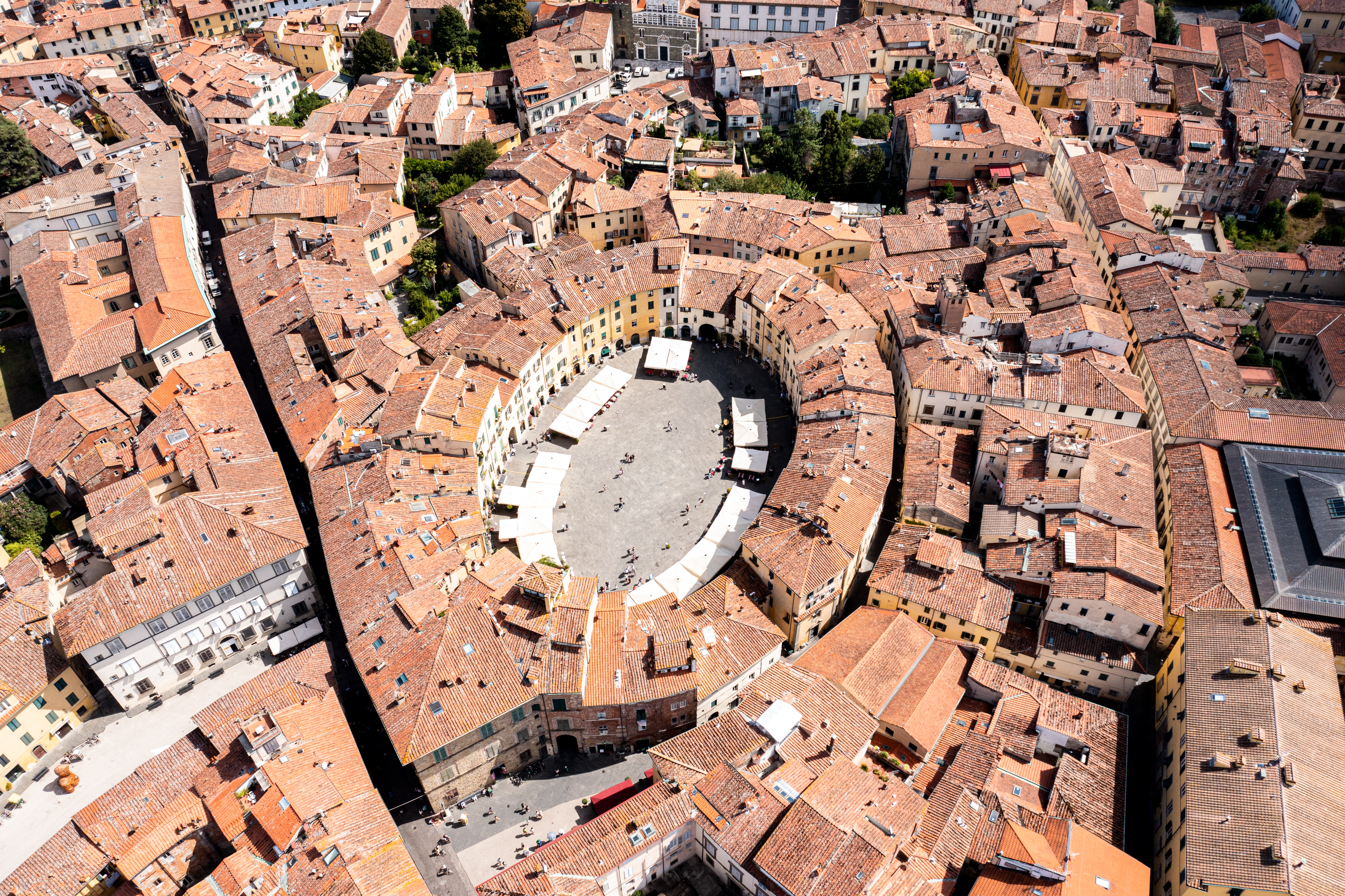
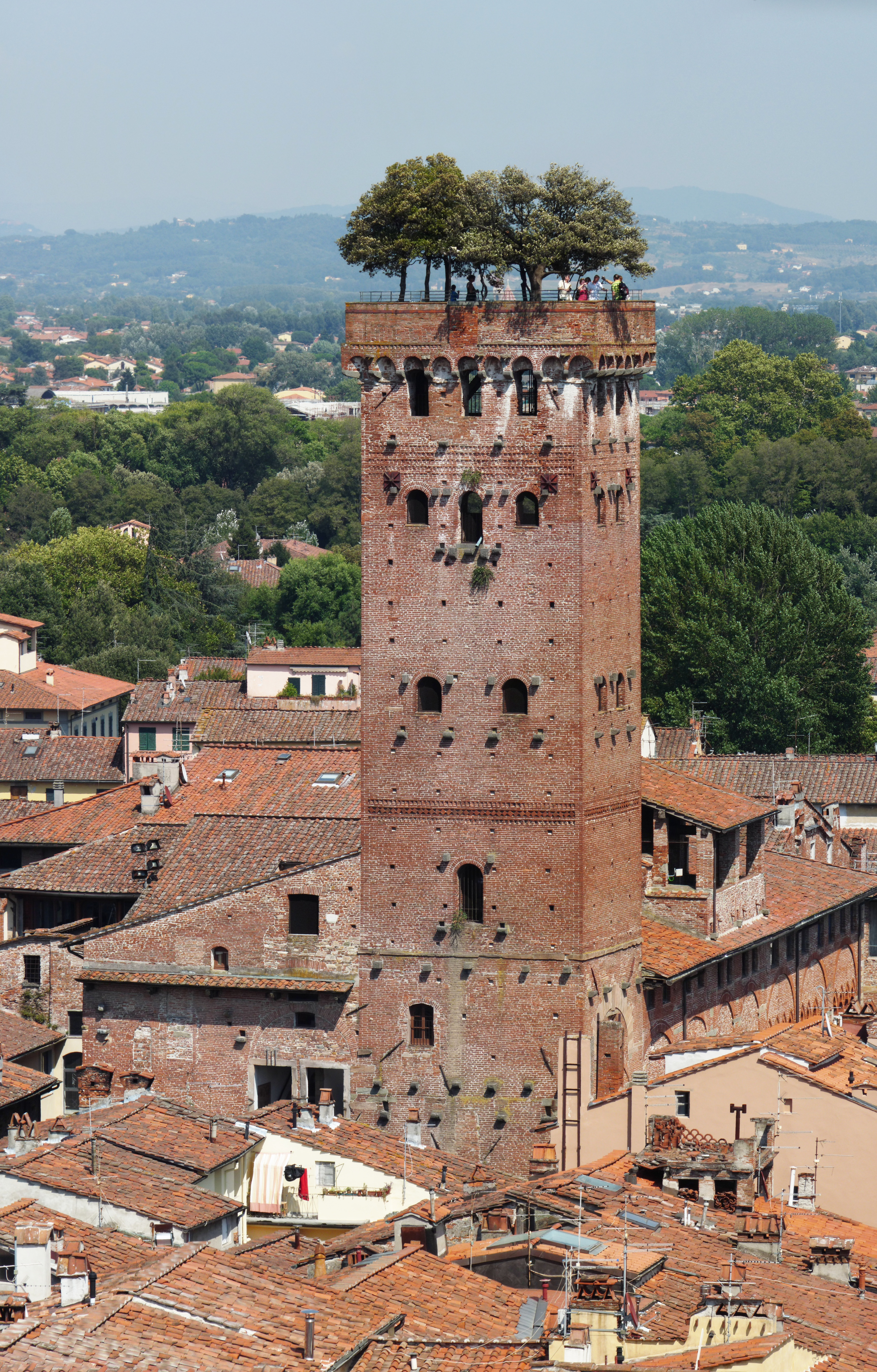
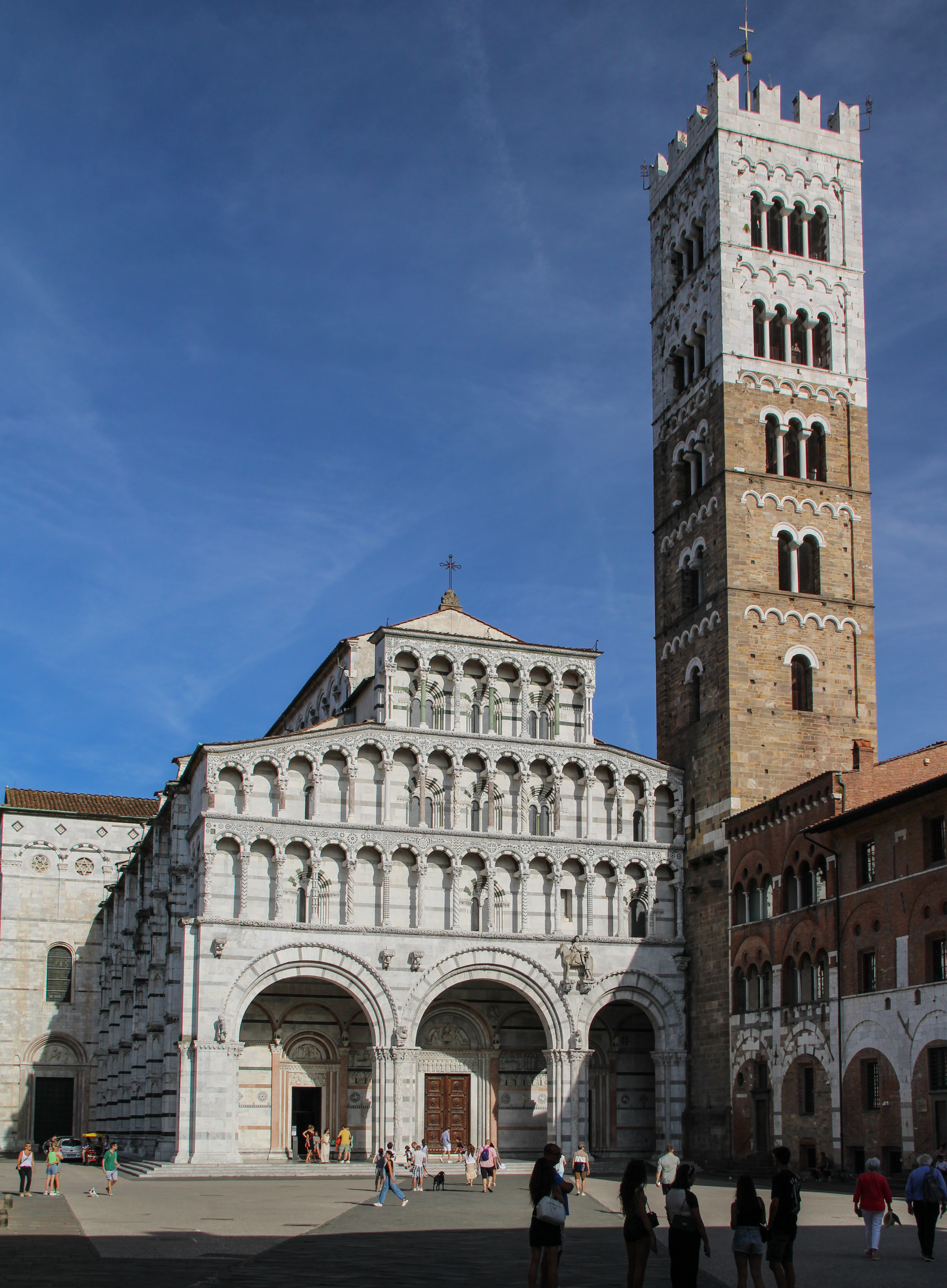
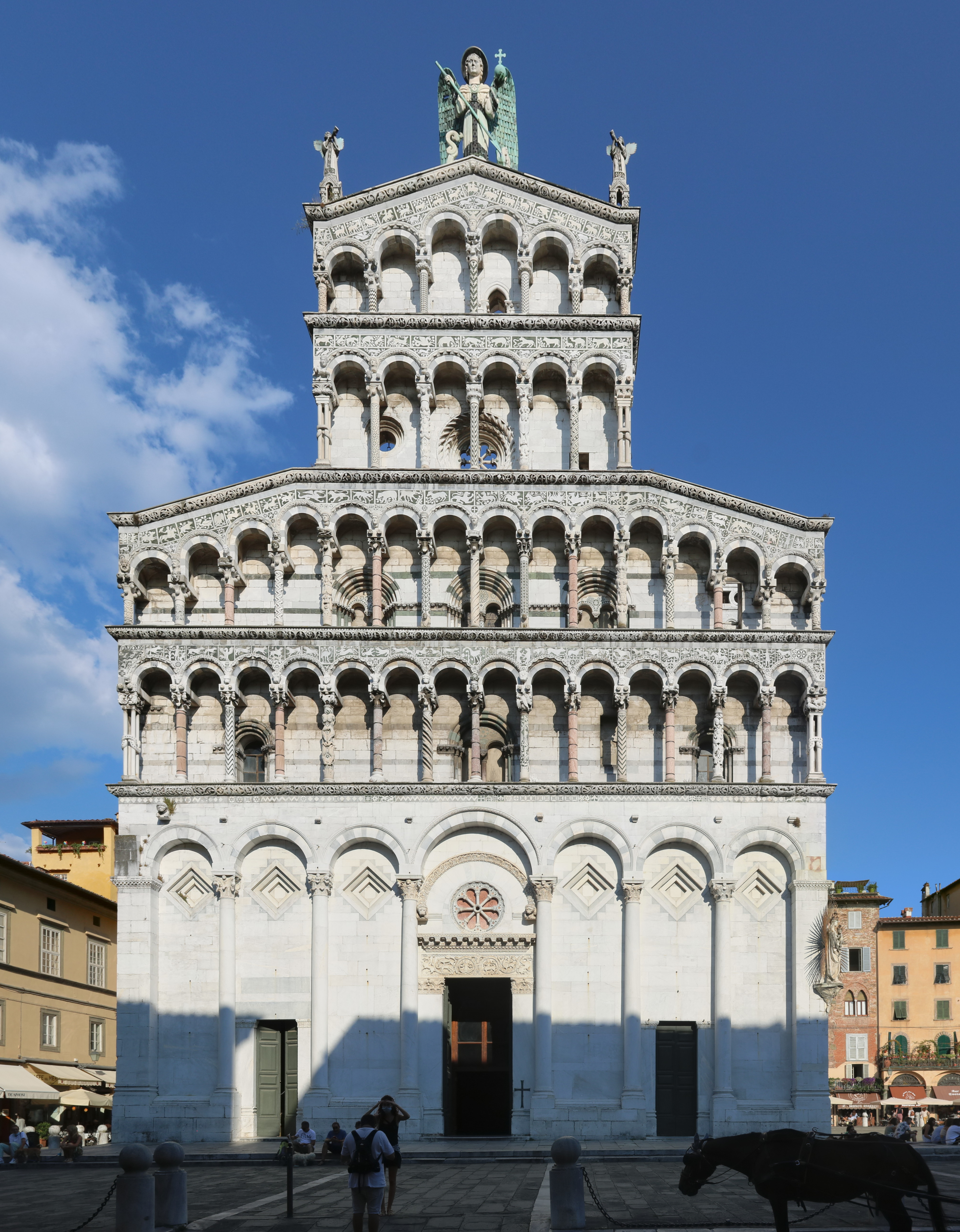
- Aerial view Piazza dell'Anfiteatro Guinigi Tower Lucca Cathedral San Michele in Foro

- Flag Coat of arms

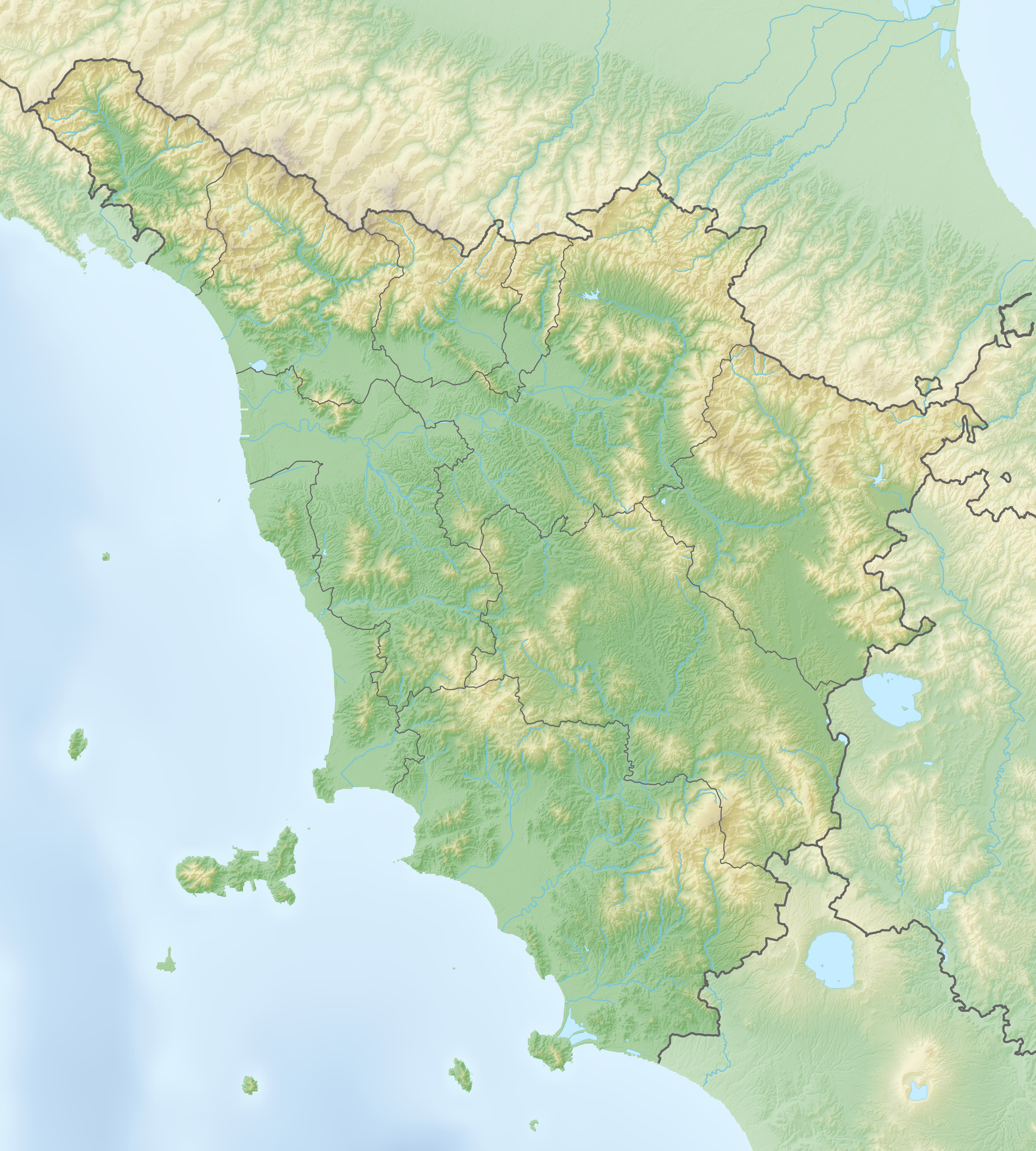
- Location within Italy Location within Tuscany
- Coordinates: 43°50′30″N 10°30′10″E
- Country: Italy
- Region: Tuscany
- Province: Lucca (LU)
- Frazioni: see list

Government
  - Mayor: Mario Pardini (Independent)

Area
  - Total: 185.5 km^{2} (71.6 sq mi)
- Elevation: 19 m (62 ft)

Population (30 September 2017)
  - Total: 89,346
  - Density: 481.6/km^{2} (1,247/sq mi)
- Demonym: Lucchesi
- Time zone: UTC+1 (CET)
  - Summer (DST): UTC+2 (CEST)
- Postal code: 55100
- Dialing code: 0583
- ISTAT code: 046017
- Patron saint: St. Paulinus
- Saint day: July 12
- Website: comune.lucca.it

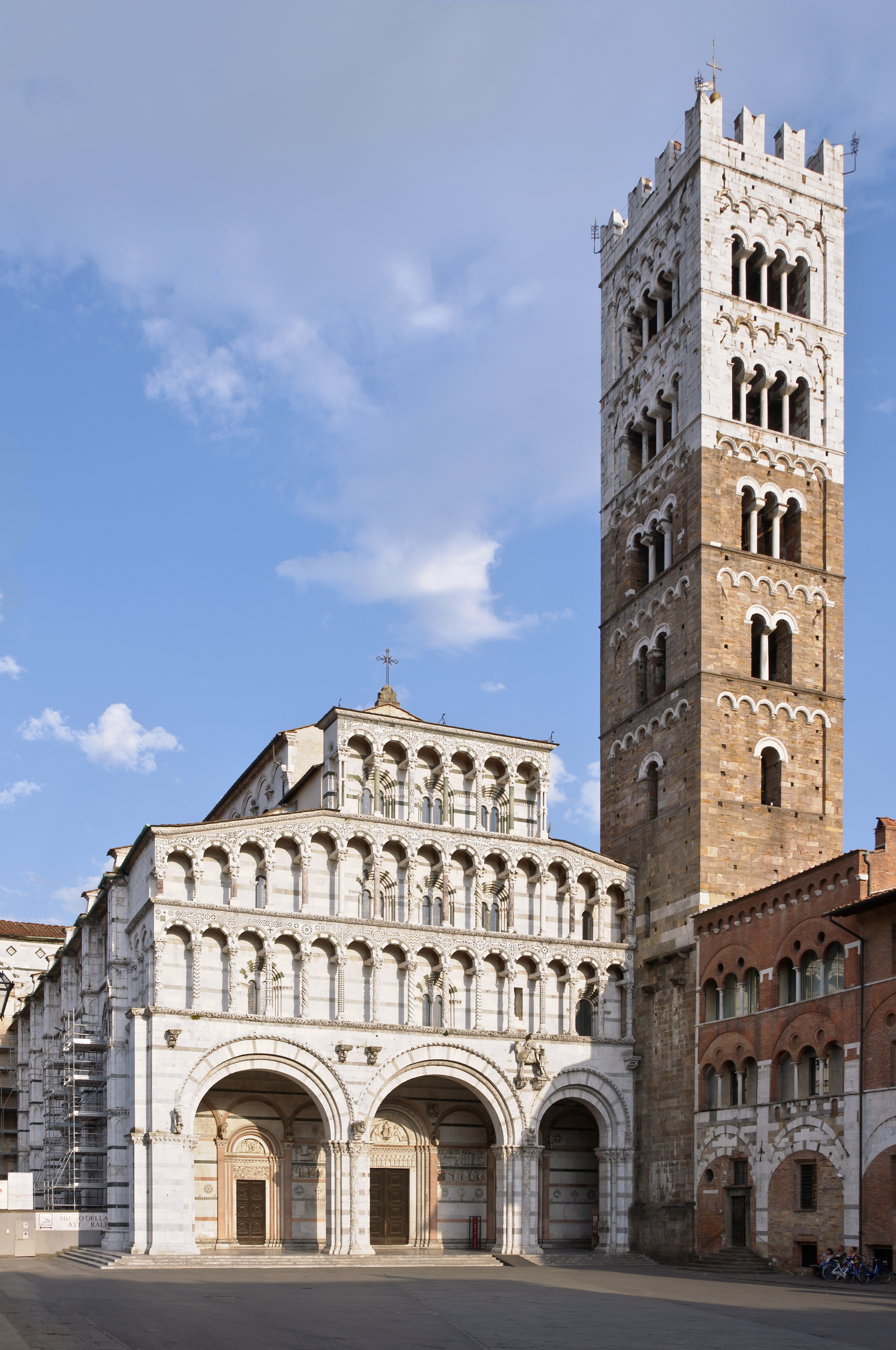
Lucca Cathedral

Lucca (/ˈluːkə/ LOO-kə; Italian: [ˈlukka]) is a city and comune in Tuscany, Central Italy, on the Serchio River, in a fertile plain.

The city has a population of about 89,000, while its province has a population of 383,957. Lucca is known as an Italian "Città d'arte" (City of Art) from its almost intact Renaissance-era city walls and its very well preserved historic center, where, among other buildings and monuments, are located the Piazza dell'Anfiteatro, which has its origins in the second half of the 1st century A.D., the Guinigi Tower, a 45-metre-tall (150 ft) tower that dates from the 14th century and the Cathedral of San Martino.

The city is the birthplace of numerous world-class composers, including Giacomo Puccini, Alfredo Catalani, and Luigi Boccherini.

== Toponymy ==
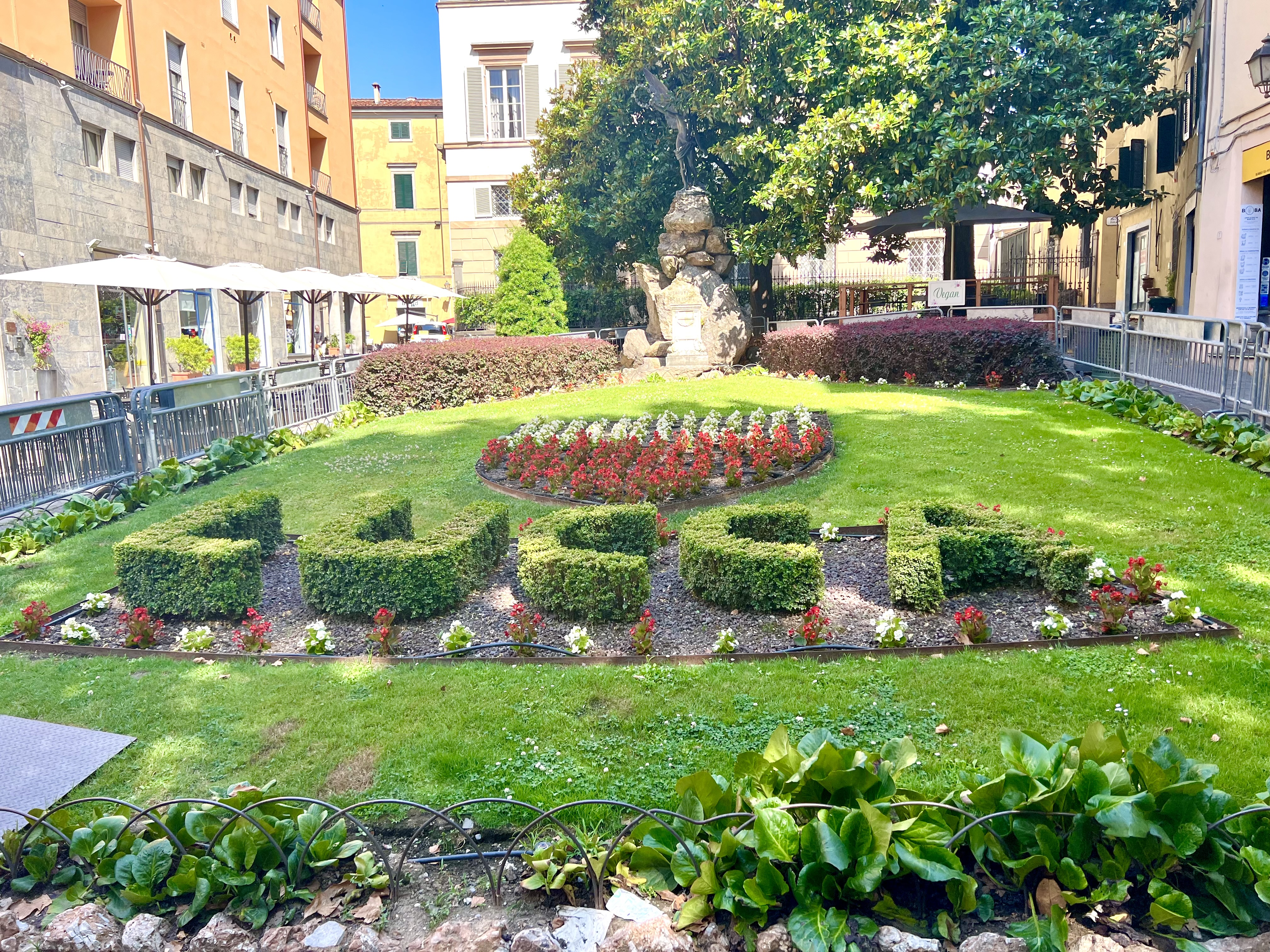
Photo of a hedge that spells “Lucca” at Monumento ai Caduti per la Patria

To Ancient Romans, Lucca was known as Luca. From more recent and concrete toponymic studies, the name Lucca has references that lead to "sacred grove" (Latin: lucus), "to cut" (Latin: lucare) and "luminous space" (leuk, a term used by the first European populations). The origin apparently refers to a wooded area deforested to make room for light or to a clearing located on a river island of Serchio debris, in the middle of wooded areas.

== History ==
=== Antiquity ===
The territory of present-day Lucca was certainly settled by the Etruscans, and it also has traces of a probable earlier Ligurian presence (called Luk meaning "marsh", which was previously speculated as a possible origin of the city's name), dating from the 3rd century BC. However, it was only with the arrival of the Romans that the area took on the appearance of a real town. It obtained the status of a Roman colony in 180 BC and of a municipality (municipium) in 89 BC.

The rectangular grid of its historical centre preserves the Roman street plan, and the Piazza San Michele occupies the site of the ancient forum. The outline of the Roman amphitheatre is still seen in the Piazza dell'Anfiteatro, and the outline of a Roman theater is visible in Piazza Sant'Agostino. Fragments of the Roman-era walls are incorporated into the church of Santa Maria della Rosa.

At the Lucca Conference, in 56 BC, Julius Caesar, Pompey, and Crassus reaffirmed their political alliance known as the First Triumvirate.

=== Middle Ages ===
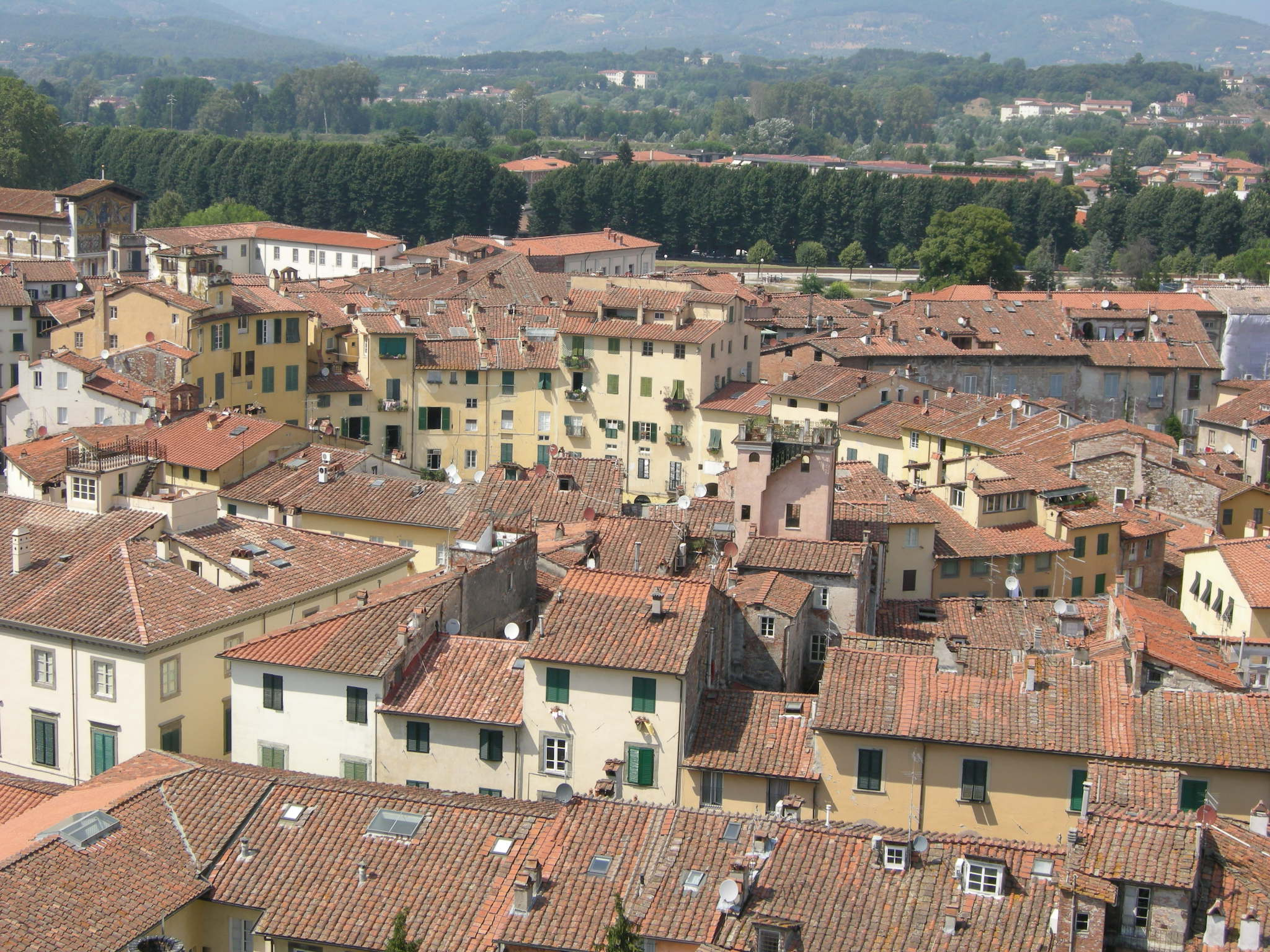
Piazza dell'Anfiteatro and the Basilica of San Frediano

Frediano, an Irish monk, was bishop of Lucca in the early sixth century. At one point, Lucca was plundered by Odoacer, the first Germanic king of Italy. Lucca was an important city and fortress even in the sixth century, when Narses besieged it for several months in 553. From 576 to 797, under the Lombards, it was the capital of a duchy, known as Duchy of Tuscia, which included a large part of today's Tuscany and the province of Viterbo; during this time the city also minted its own coins. The Holy Face of Lucca (or Volto Santo), an 8 foot tall crucifix and the oldest surviving wooden carving in Europe supposedly carved by Nicodemus, arrived in 742.

Among the population that inhabited Lucca in the medieval era, there was also a significant presence of Jews. The first mention of their presence in the city is from a document from the year 859. The Jewish community was led by the Kalonymos family (which later became a major component of proto-Ashkenazic Jewry).

Thanks above all to the Holy Face and to the relics of important saints, such as San Regolo and Saint Fridianus, the city was one of the main destinations of the Via Francigena, the major pilgrimage route to Rome from the north.

Lucca cloth was a silk fabric that was woven with gold or silver threads. It was a popular type of textile in Lucca throughout the mediaeval period.

Lucca became prosperous through the silk trade that began in the eleventh century, and came to rival the silks of Byzantium. During the tenth–eleventh centuries Lucca was the capital of the feudal margraviate of Tuscany, more or less independent but owing nominal allegiance to the Holy Roman emperor.

In 1057, Anselm of Baggio (later Pope Alexander II) was appointed bishop of Lucca, a position he held also during the papacy. As bishop of Lucca he managed to rebuild the patrimony of the Church of Lucca, recovering alienated assets and obtaining numerous donations thanks to his prestige, and had the Cathedral of the city rebuilt. From 1073 to 1086, the bishop of Lucca was his nephew Anselm II, a prominent figure in the Investiture Controversy.

During the High Middle Ages, one of the most illustrious dynasties of Lucca was the noble Allucingoli family, which managed to forge strong ties with the Church. Among the family members were Ubaldo Allucingoli, who was elected to the Papacy as Pope Lucius III in 1181, and the Cardinals Gerardo Allucingoli and Uberto Allucingoli.

=== Republican period (12th to 19th century) ===
After the death of Matilda of Tuscany, the city began to constitute itself as an independent commune with a charter in 1160. For almost 500 years, Lucca remained an independent republic. There were many minor provinces in the region between southern Liguria and northern Tuscany dominated by the Malaspina; Tuscany in this time was a part of feudal Europe. Dante's Divine Comedy includes many references to the great feudal families who had huge jurisdictions with administrative and judicial rights. Dante spent some of his exile in Lucca.

In 1273 and again in 1277, Lucca was ruled by a Guelph capitano del popolo (captain of the people) named Luchetto Gattilusio. In 1314, internal discord allowed Uguccione della Faggiuola of Pisa to make himself lord of Lucca. The Lucchesi expelled him two years later, and handed over the city to another condottiero, Castruccio Castracani, under whose rule it became a leading state in central Italy. Lucca rivalled Florence until Castracani's death in 1328. On 22 and 23 September 1325, in the battle of Altopascio, Castracani defeated Florence's Guelphs. For this he was nominated by Louis IV the Bavarian to become duke of Lucca. Castracani's tomb is in the church of San Francesco. His biography is Machiavelli's third famous book on political rule.

Occupied by the troops of Louis of Bavaria, the city was sold to a rich Genoese, Gherardino Spinola, then seized by John, king of Bohemia. Pawned to the Rossi of Parma, by them it was ceded to Mastino II della Scala of Verona, sold to the Florentines, surrendered to the Pisans, and then nominally liberated by the emperor Charles IV and governed by his vicar.

In 1408, Lucca hosted a convocation organized by Pope Gregory XII with his cardinals intended to end the schism in the papacy.

Lucca managed, at first as a democracy, and after 1628 as an oligarchy, to maintain its independence alongside of Venice and Genoa, and painted the word Libertas on its banner until the French Revolution in 1789.

=== Early modern period ===
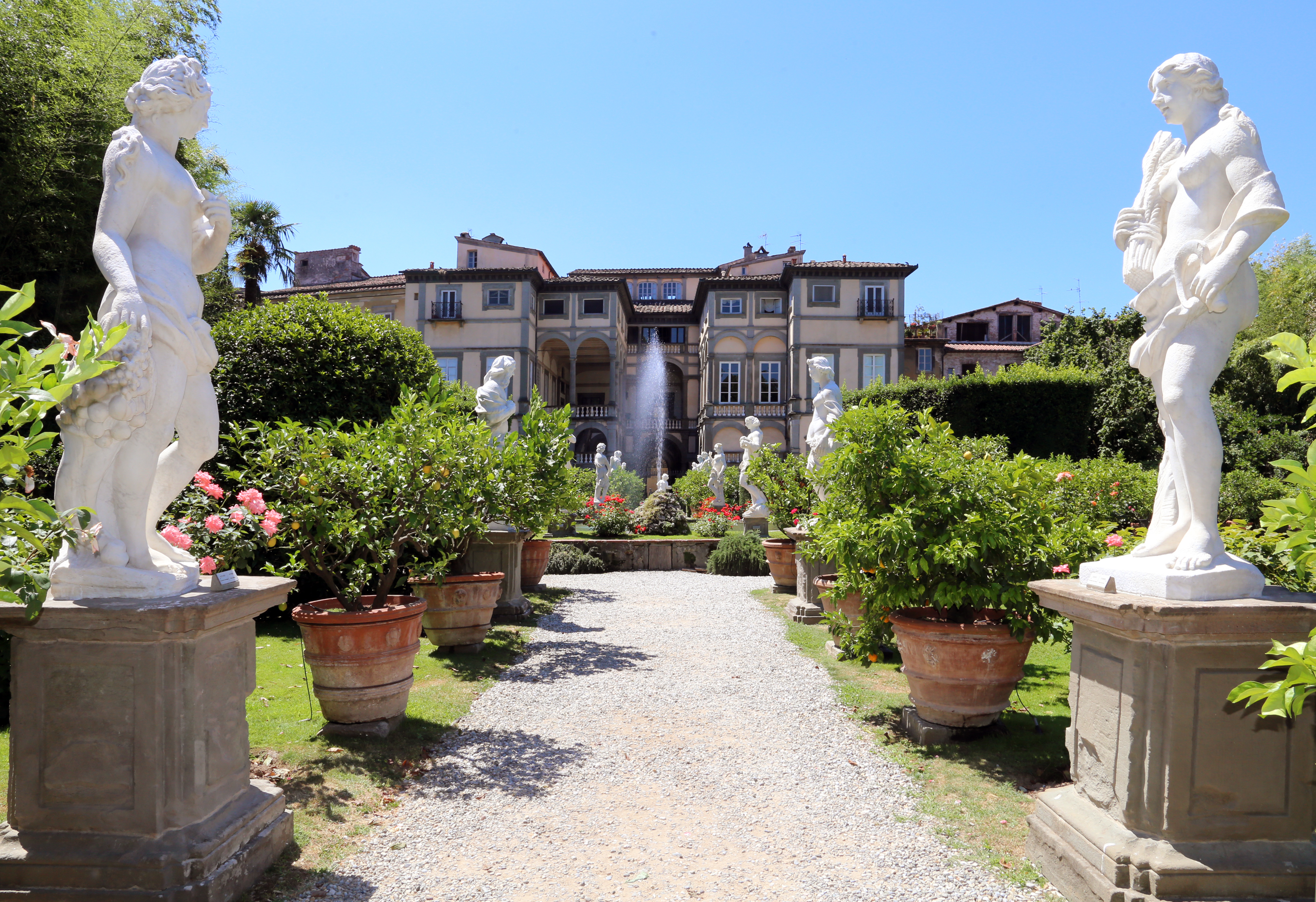
Palazzo Pfanner, garden view

Lucca had been the second largest Italian city state (after Venice) with a republican constitution ("comune") to remain independent over the centuries.

Between 1799 and 1800, it was contested by the French and Austrian armies. Finally the French prevailed and granted a democratic constitution in 1801. In 1805 the Republic of Lucca was converted into a monarchy by Napoleon, who installed his sister Elisa Bonaparte Baciocchi as "Princess of Lucca".

From 1815 to 1847, it was a Bourbon-Parma duchy. The only reigning dukes of Lucca were Maria Luisa of Spain, and her son Charles II, Duke of Parma, who succeeded her in 1824. Meanwhile, the Duchy of Parma had been assigned for life to Marie Louise, Duchess of Parma, the second wife of Napoleon. In accordance with the Treaty of Vienna (1815), upon the death of Marie Louise, Duchess of Parma in 1847, Parma reverted to Charles II, Duke of Parma, while Lucca lost independence and was annexed to the Grand Duchy of Tuscany. As part of Tuscany, it became part of the Kingdom of Sardinia in 1860 and finally part of the Italian State in 1861.

=== World War II internment camp ===
In 1942, during World War II, a prisoner-of-war camp was established at the village of Colle di Compito, in the municipality of Capannori, about 11 kilometres (6.8 mi) from Lucca. Its official number was P.G. (prigionieri di guerra) 60, and it was usually referred to as PG 60 Lucca. Although it never had permanent structures and accommodation consisted of tents in an area prone to flooding, it housed more than 3,000 British and Commonwealth prisoners of war during the period of its existence. It was handed over to the Germans on 10 September 1943, not long after the signing of the Italian armistice. During the Italian Social Republic, as a puppet state of the Germans, political prisoners, foreigners, common law prisoners and Jews were interned there, and it functioned as a concentration camp. In June 1944, the prisoners were moved to Bagni di Lucca.

== Climate ==
The climate of Lucca is classified as a Mediterranean climate (Csa under the Köppen climate classification). It features sub-Mediterranean and oceanic influences due to its proximity to the Ligurian and Tyrrhenian seas, as well as the layout of the surrounding mountain ranges.

Winters (December to February) are generally mild but humid. Average minimum temperatures hover around 2-4°C (36°-40°F), while average maximum temperatures range between 10-14°C (50°-57°F). Night frosts can occur from mid-December to late February, especially during clear nights due to temperature inversions, with lows sometimes dropping to -2°C/-3°C (29°-27°F). However, there is great variability, with some winters seeing only a few night frosts and others experiencing as many as 15/20. Accumulating snowfall in the city center is rare, although the surrounding peaks of the Apuan Alps and the Apennines are regularly snow-capped.

Spring is a highly unstable and rainy season, especially during March and April. Temperatures rise rapidly as the season progresses, with average maximum temperatures in May regularly exceeding 22 °C (71°F). Frequent winds help partially mitigate the inland humidity.

Summer (June to mid-September) is hot and sunny. Average maximum temperatures reach or exceed 30°C (86°F), and during heatwaves exceed 35°C (95°F), with peaks approaching 38°C (100°F) or even exceeding it in July and August, with an absolute maximum recorded of 41.5°C (106.7°F). Relative humidity levels are quite high, creating muggy and humid conditions. During summer afternoons, the Lucca plain experiences a regular sea breeze (primarily blowing from the west-southwest), which originates from the Tyrrhenian coast and travels inland through the Serchio and Arno valleys. This wind typically develops between 1:00 PM and 2:00 PM, reaching its peak intensity in the late afternoon before dying down after sunset. The breeze provides a natural cooling effect, helping to mitigate the stagnant humidity and high temperatures, and accelerating the temperature drop during the evening. Summer thunderstorms are rare but can be intense, triggered by fast-moving weather fronts or by afternoon convective activity near the mountains.

Autumn is the wettest period of the year. Peak precipitation occurs between October and November. This is caused by Atlantic weather systems hitting the barrier of the Apuan Alps and the Apennine Mountains. The resulting orographic lift (effetto stau) drops heavy rainfall over the plain. Temperatures drop gradually but remain mild until late October.

Climate data for Lucca (1991–2020 normals, extremes 1933–present)
Month	Jan	Feb	Mar	Apr	May	Jun	Jul	Aug	Sep	Oct	Nov	Dec	Year
Record high °C (°F)	18.2 (64.8)	20.6 (69.1)	24.2 (75.6)	31.1 (88.0)	35.9 (96.6)	38.3 (100.9)	40.3 (104.5)	41.5 (106.7)	36.0 (96.8)	30.7 (87.3)	24.2 (75.6)	18.7 (65.7)	41.5 (106.7)
Mean daily maximum °C (°F)	10.9 (51.6)	12.7 (54.9)	16.4 (61.5)	20.0 (68.0)	24.6 (76.3)	28.7 (83.7)	31.5 (88.7)	31.7 (89.1)	26.8 (80.2)	21.1 (70.0)	15.1 (59.2)	11.1 (52.0)	20.9 (69.6)
Daily mean °C (°F)	6.7 (44.1)	7.8 (46.0)	11.0 (51.8)	14.3 (57.7)	18.5 (65.3)	22.4 (72.3)	24.9 (76.8)	25.0 (77.0)	20.6 (69.1)	16.2 (61.2)	11.2 (52.2)	7.2 (45.0)	15.5 (59.9)
Mean daily minimum °C (°F)	2.6 (36.7)	2.9 (37.2)	5.6 (42.1)	8.5 (47.3)	12.4 (54.3)	16.1 (61.0)	18.3 (64.9)	18.2 (64.8)	14.5 (58.1)	11.2 (52.2)	7.3 (45.1)	3.4 (38.1)	10.1 (50.2)
Record low °C (°F)	−13.4 (7.9)	−8.8 (16.2)	−5.6 (21.9)	0.0 (32.0)	2.5 (36.5)	8.5 (47.3)	9.1 (48.4)	10.6 (51.1)	6.0 (42.8)	−0.9 (30.4)	−3.0 (26.6)	−7.0 (19.4)	−13.4 (7.9)
Average precipitation mm (inches)	108 (4.3)	101 (4.0)	94 (3.7)	91 (3.6)	77 (3.0)	71 (2.8)	39 (1.5)	47 (1.9)	123 (4.8)	157 (6.2)	192 (7.6)	145 (5.7)	1,245 (49.0)
Average precipitation days (≥ 1.0 mm)	9.3	8.3	8.2	9.4	7.1	5.8	3.2	3.6	7.4	9.8	11.6	11.4	95.2
Source 1: Consorzio LaMMA
Source 2: Temperature estreme in Toscana

== Population ==
Historical population

Year	Pop.	±%
1861	66,061	—
1871	70,537	+6.8%
1881	70,404	−0.2%
1901	73,465	+4.3%
1911	75,464	+2.7%
1921	77,880	+3.2%
1931	79,852	+2.5%
1936	82,300	+3.1%

Year	Pop.	±%
1951	88,302	+7.3%
1961	88,428	+0.1%
1971	90,995	+2.9%
1981	91,246	+0.3%
1991	87,100	−4.5%
2001	81,862	−6.0%
2011	87,200	+6.5%
2021	89,078	+2.2%

Source: ISTAT

== Culture ==
Lucca is the birthplace of composers Giacomo Puccini (La Bohème and Madama Butterfly), Nicolao Dorati, Francesco Geminiani, Gioseffo Guami, Luigi Boccherini, and Alfredo Catalani. It is also the birthplace of artist Benedetto Brandimarte. Since 2004, Lucca is home to IMT Lucca, a public research institution and a selective graduate school and part of the Superior Graduate Schools in Italy (Grandes écoles).

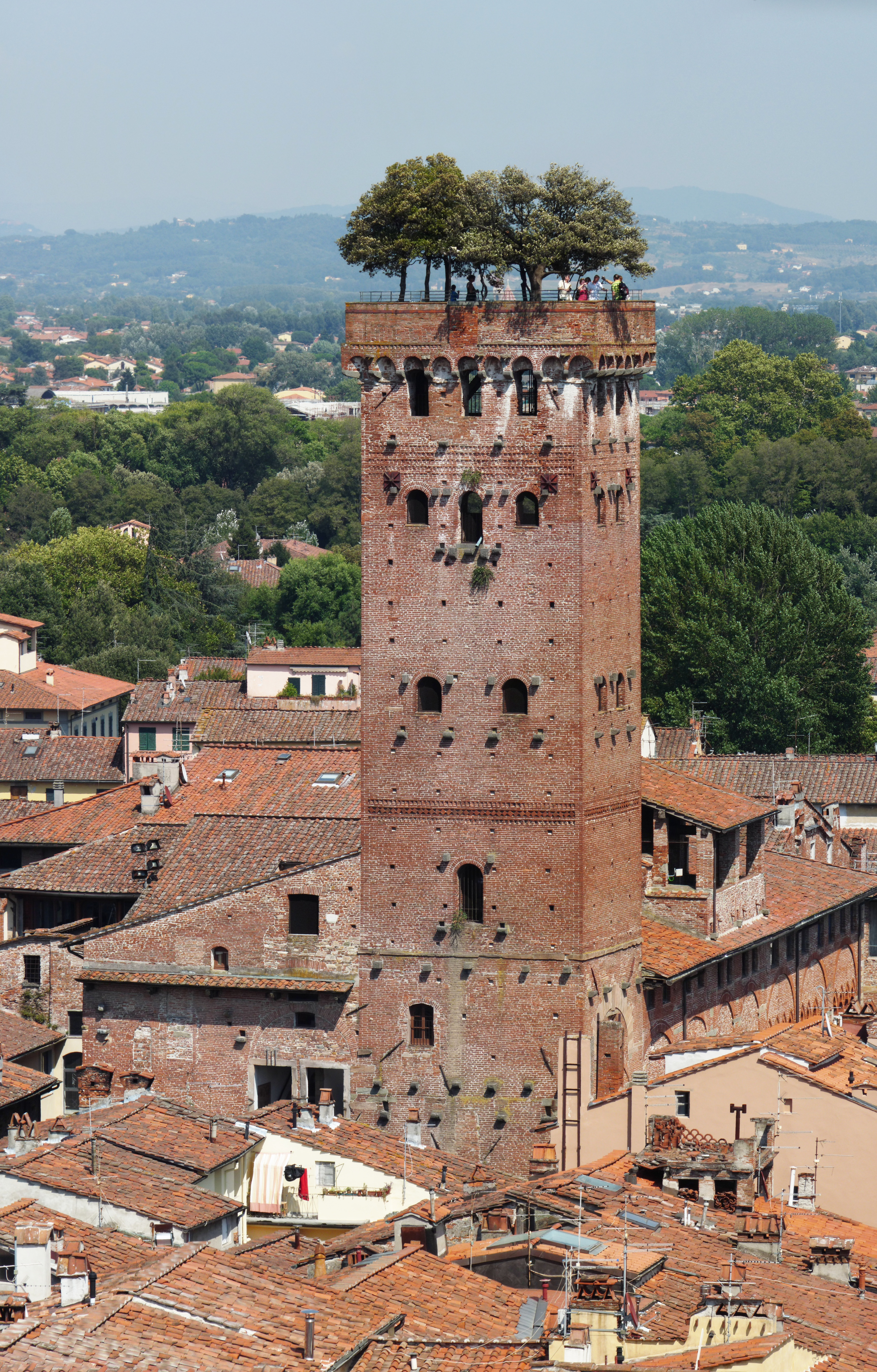
Guinigi Tower

=== Events ===
Lucca hosts the annual Lucca Summer Festival. The 2006 edition featured live performances by Eric Clapton, Placebo, Massive Attack, Roger Waters, Tracy Chapman, and Santana at the Piazza Napoleone. For the 2025 edition, Riccardo Cocciante is scheduled to perform, while the 2026 lineup features Jamiroquai on 4 July, Alabama Shakes with special guest Matt Berninger on 7 July, Katy Perry on 19 July, and Marcus Miller with the tribute show "We Want Miles!" on 21 July.

Lucca hosts the annual Lucca Comics and Games festival, Europe's largest festival for comics, movies, games and related subjects.

Other events include:

- Lucca Film Festival
- Lucca Digital Photography Fest
- Procession of Santa Croce, on 13 September. Costume procession through the town's roads.
- Lucca Jazz Donna
- Lucca Classica Music Festival

Moreover, Lucca hosts Lucca Biennale Cartasia, an international biennial contemporary art exhibition focusing solely on Paper Art.

=== Film and television ===
Mauro Bolognini's 1958 film Giovani mariti, with Sylva Koscina, is set and was filmed in Lucca.

Sergio Martino's 1993 miniseries Private Crimes, starring Edwige Fenech, is set and was filmed in Lucca.

Top Gear filmed a segment of the second episode of its 17th series here.

Peter Greenaway's upcoming film Tower Stories, starring Dustin Hoffman and Helen Hunt, is set and was filmed in Lucca.

=== Architecture ===
Lucca is known for its marble deposits. After a fire in the early 1900s, the West Wing of the Legislative Assembly of Ontario was rebuilt with marble sourced in Lucca. The floor mosaic in the West Wing was hand-laid and is constructed entirely of Lucca marble.

== Main sights ==
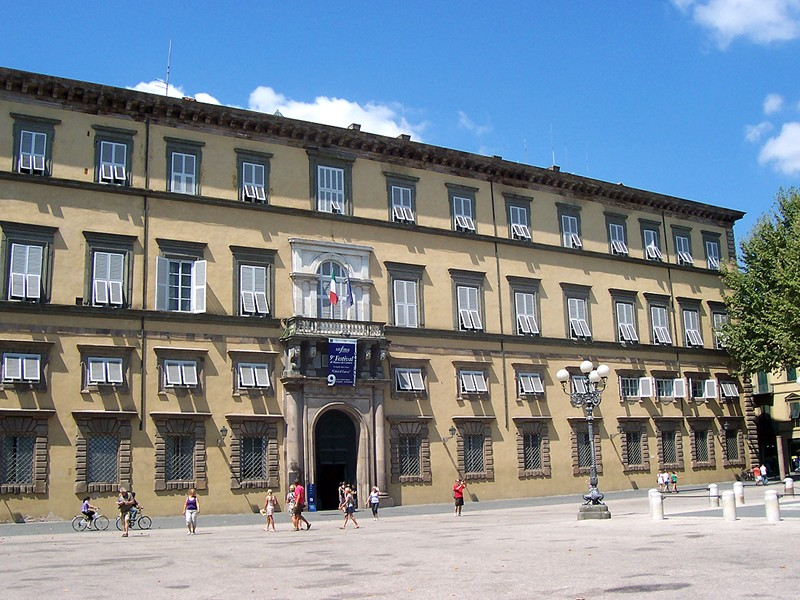
Palazzo Ducale

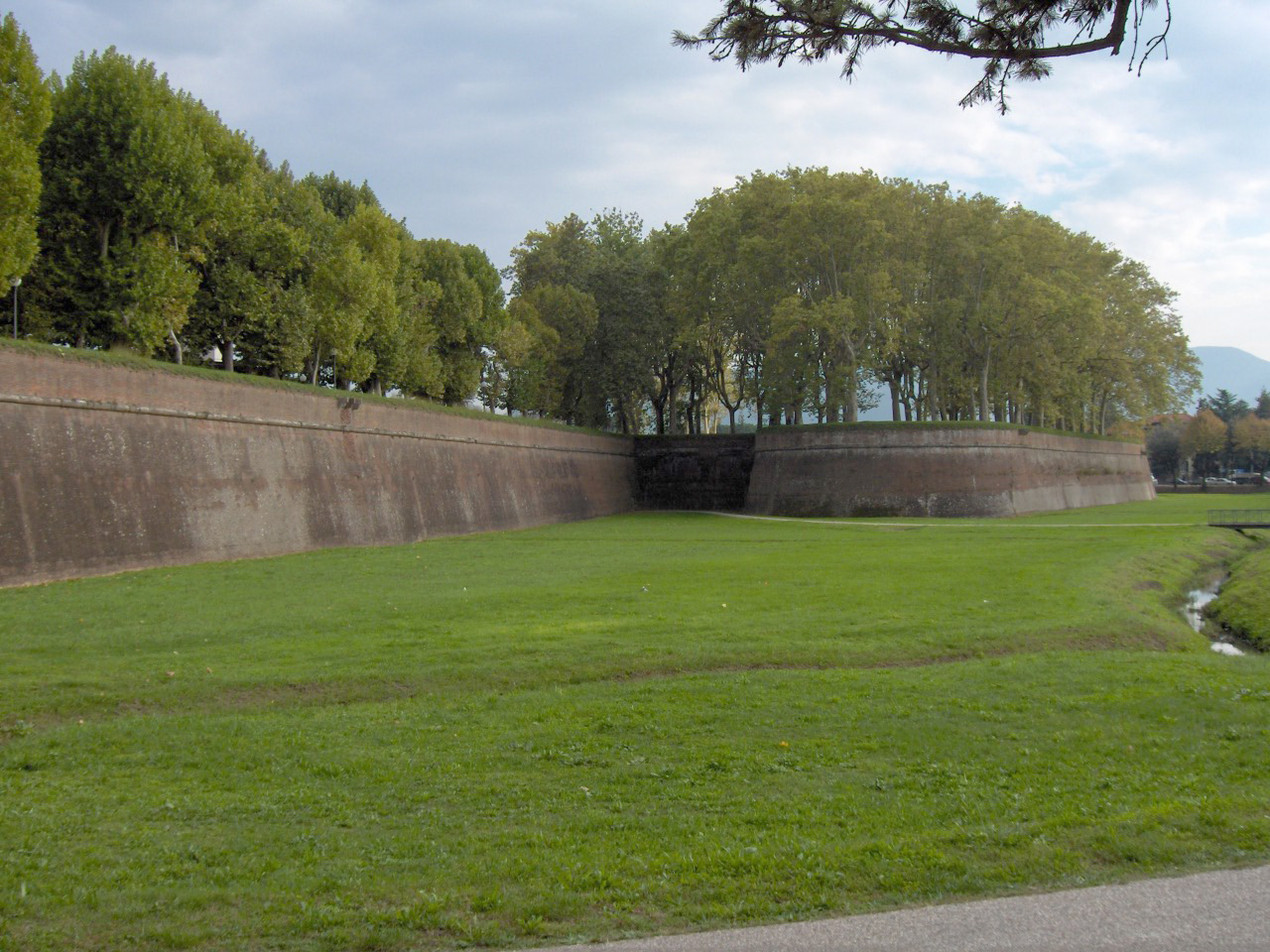
A stretch of the walls

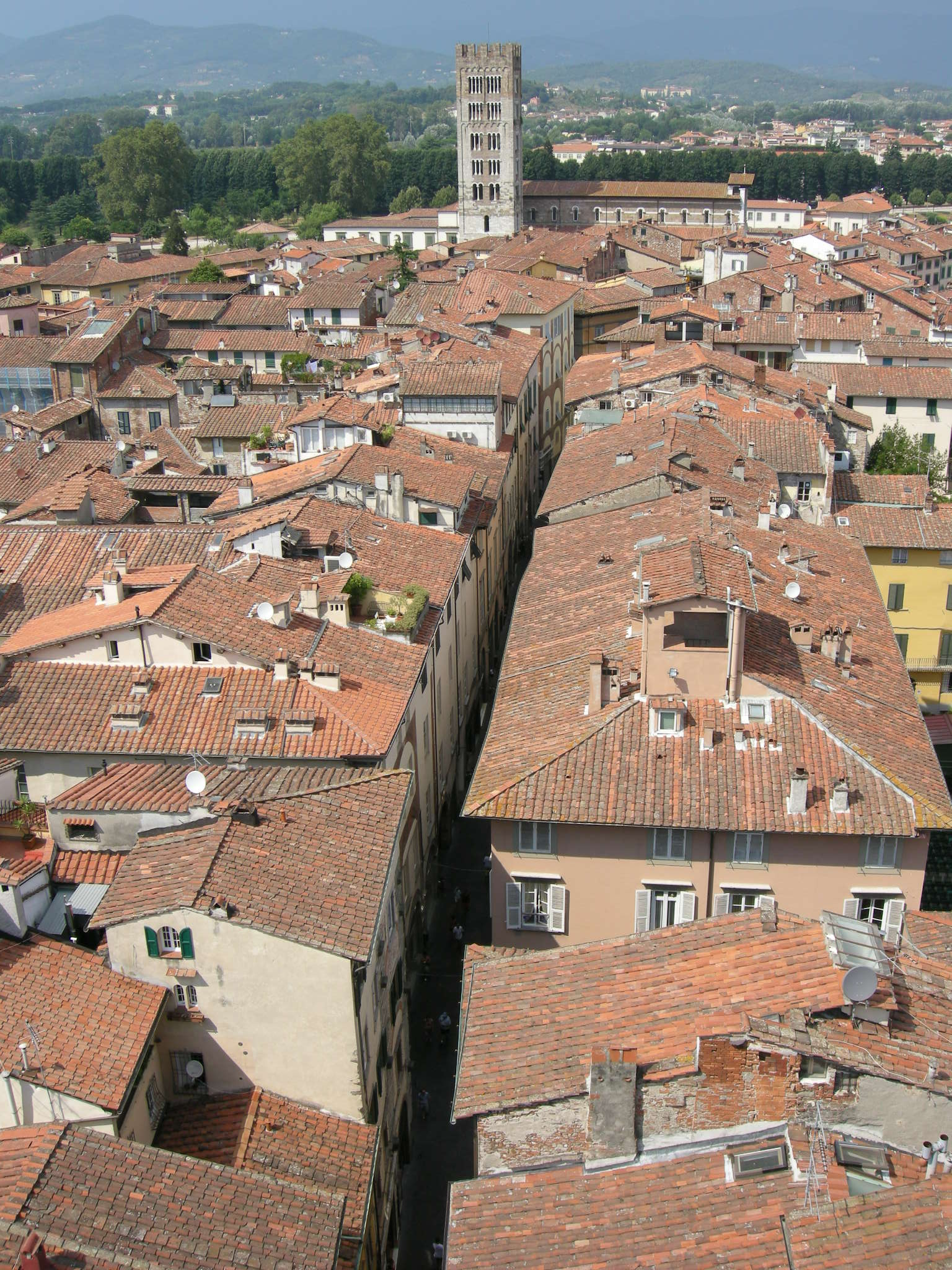
Via Fillungo view from the Clock Tower

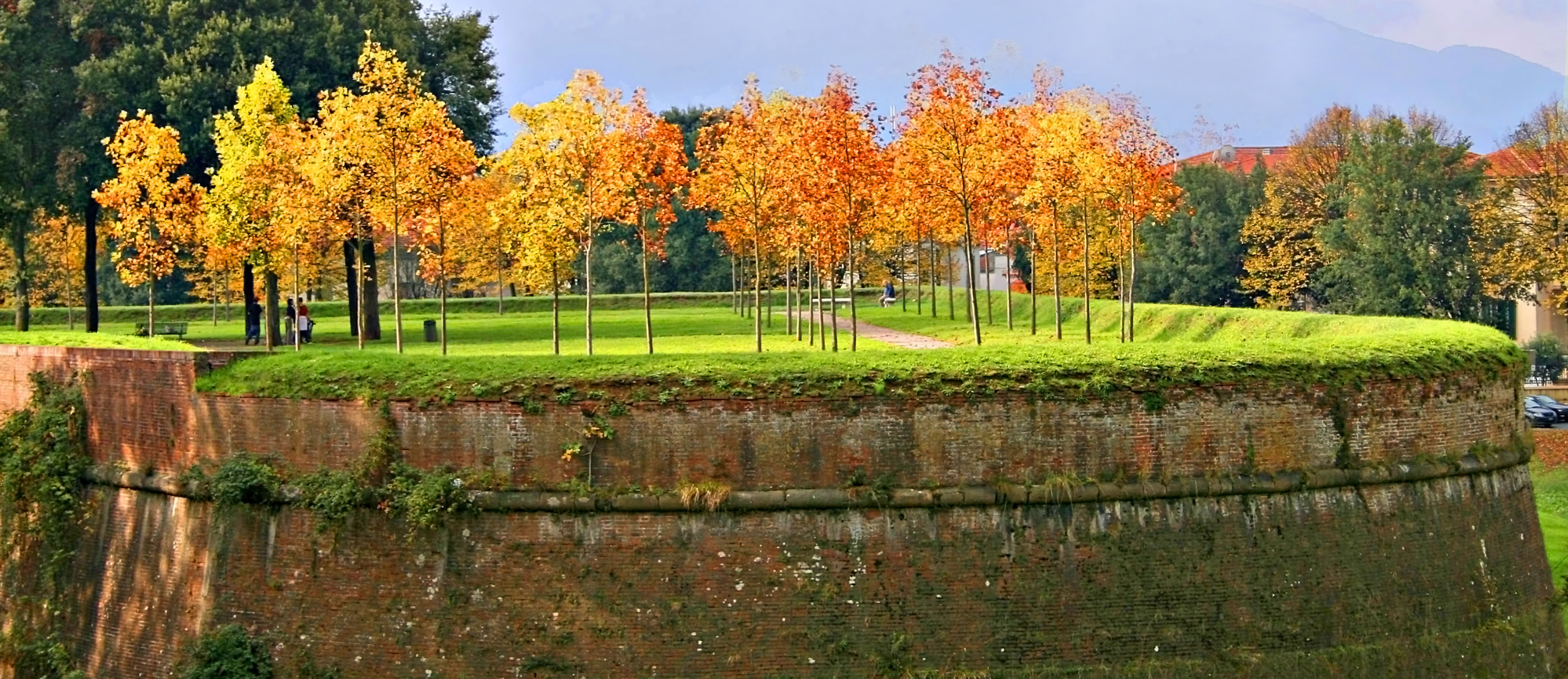
Autumn atop bastions

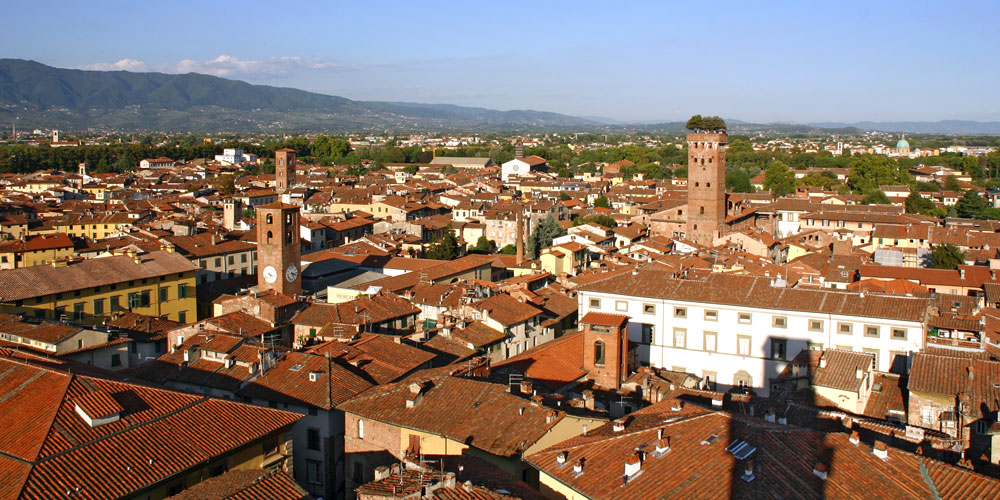
View of Lucca from the Clock Tower

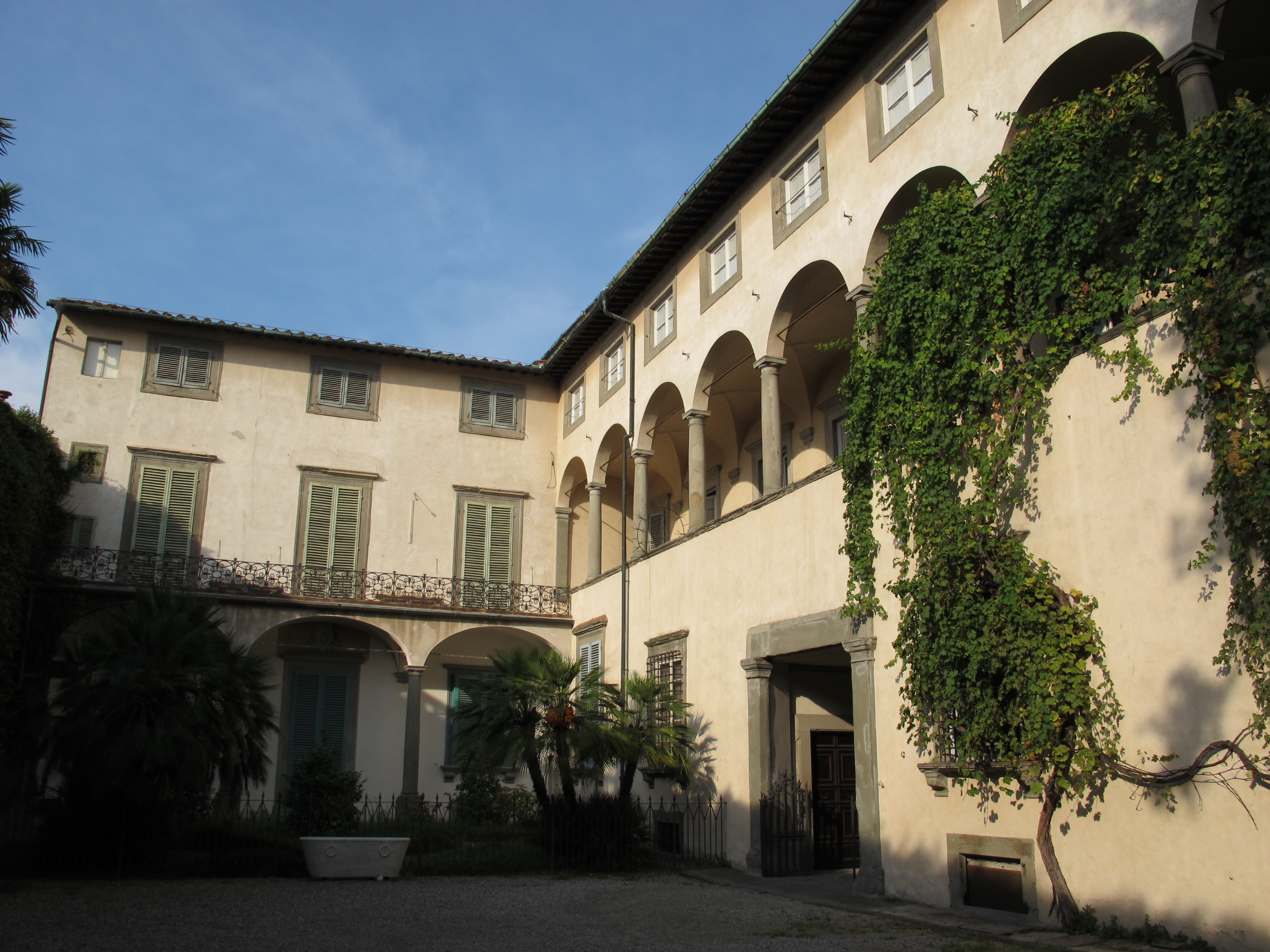
The courtyard of Museo Nazionale di Palazzo Mansi

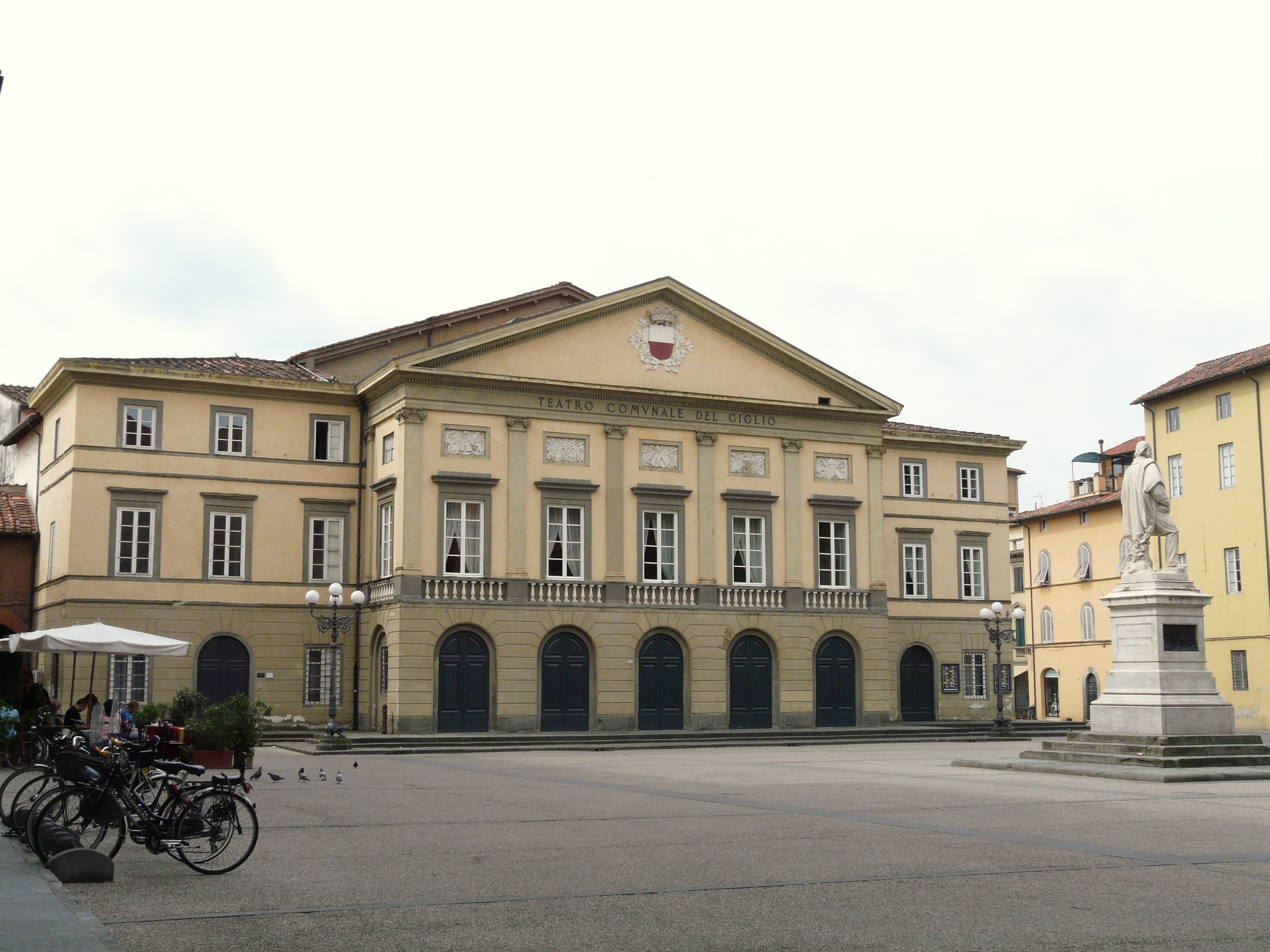
Teatro del Giglio

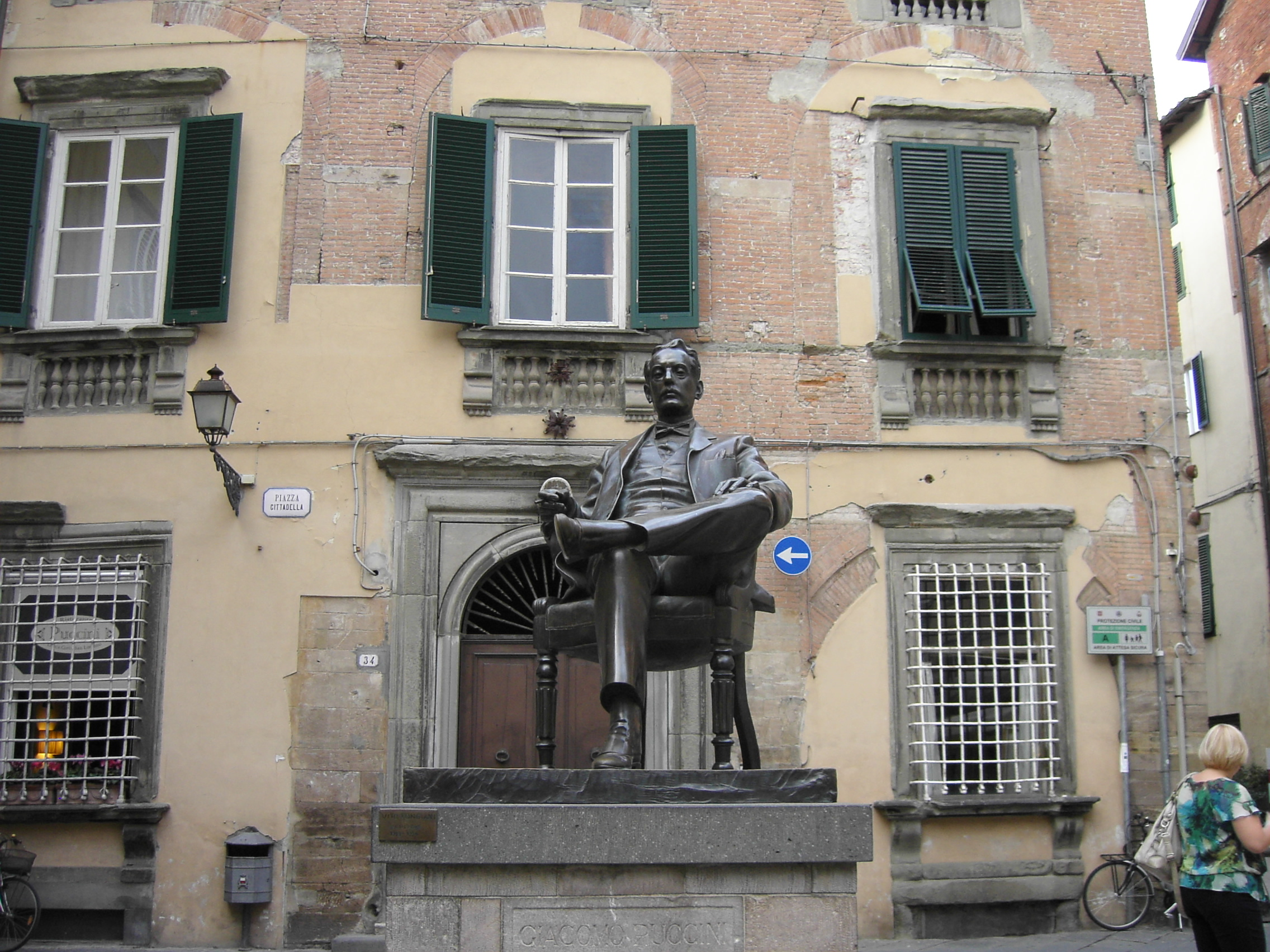
Puccini's statue on Piazza Cittadella by Vito Tongiani

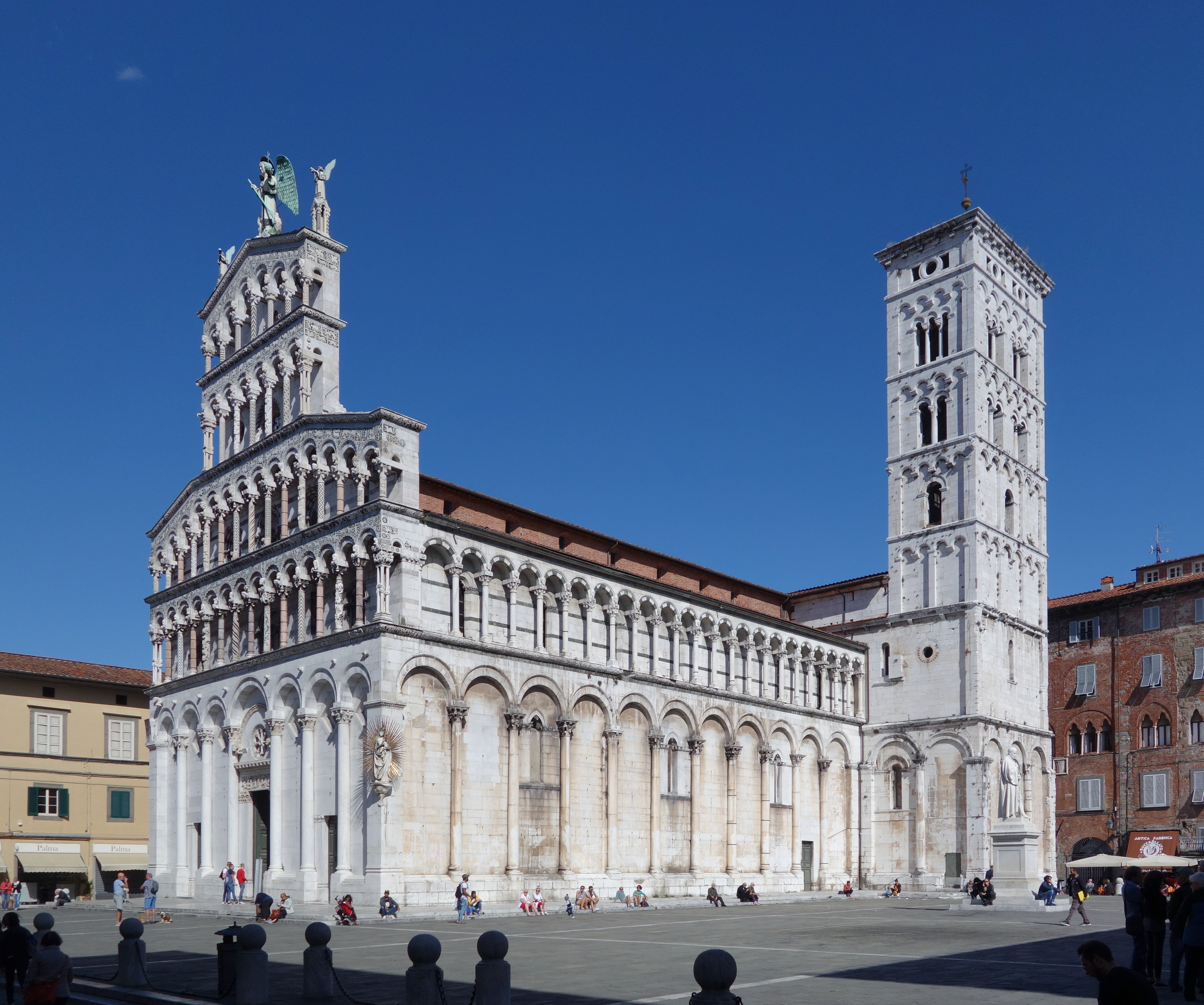
San Michele in Foro

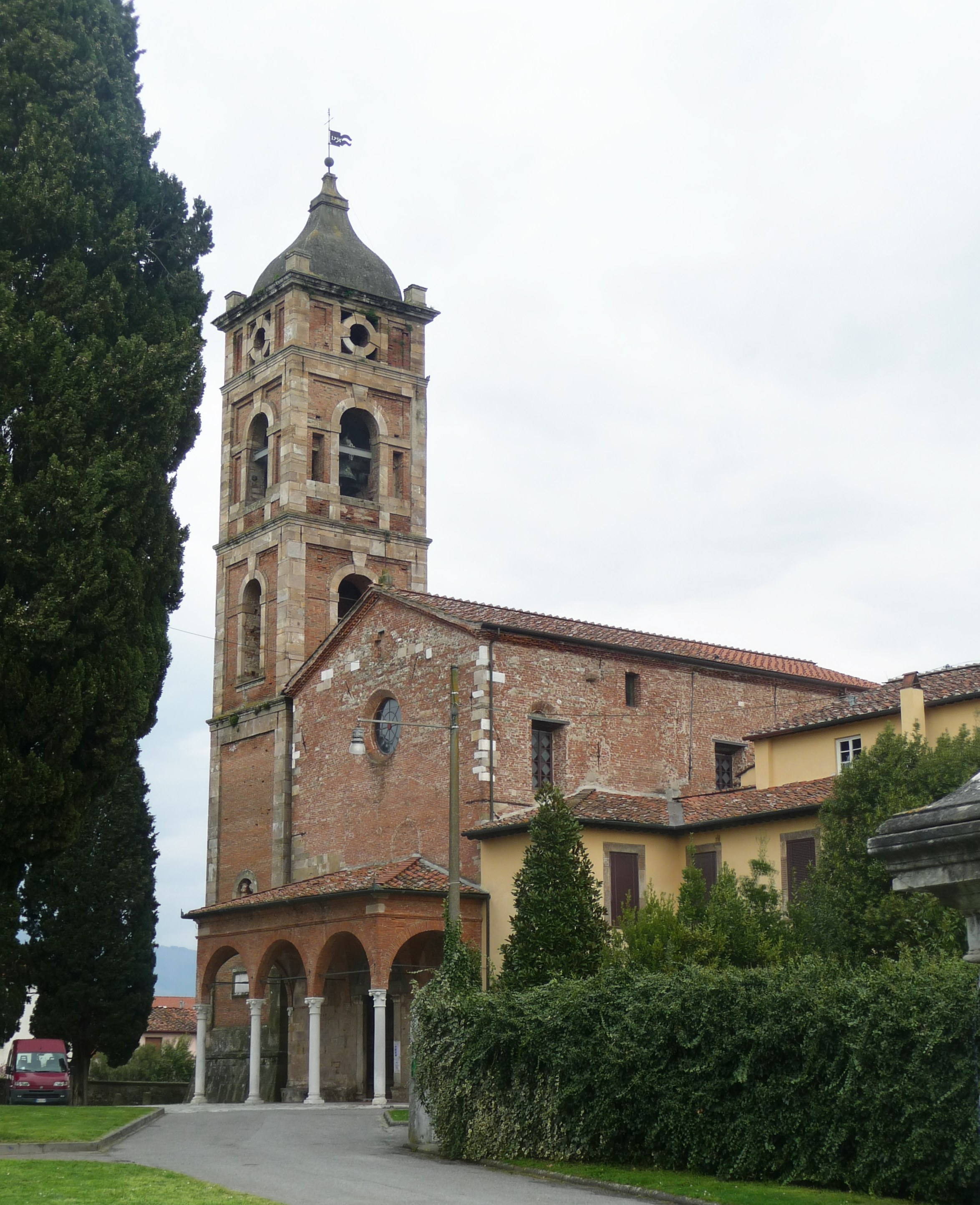
San Michele at Antraccoli

=== Walls, streets, and squares ===
The walls encircling the old town remain intact, even though the city has expanded and been modernised, which is unusual for cities in this region. These walls were built initially as a defensive rampart which, after losing their military importance, became a pedestrian promenade (the Passeggiata delle Mure Urbane) atop the walls which not only links the Bastions of Santa Croce, San Frediano, San Martino, San Pietro/Battisti, San Salvatore, La Libertà/Cairoli, San Regolo, San Colombano, Santa Maria, San Paolino/Catalani and San Donato but also passes over the gates (Porte) of San Donato, Santa Maria, San Jacopo, Elisa, San Pietro, and Sant'Anna. Each of the four principal sides of the structure is lined with a tree species different from the others.

The walled city is encircled by Piazzale Boccherini, Viale Lazzaro Papi, Viale Carlo Del Prete, Piazzale Martiri della Libertà, Via Batoni, Viale Agostino Marti, Viale G. Marconi (vide Guglielmo Marconi), Piazza Don A. Mei, Viale Pacini, Viale Giusti, Piazza Curtatone, Piazzale Ricasoli, Viale Ricasoli, Piazza Risorgimento (vide Risorgimento), and Viale Giosuè Carducci.

The town includes a number of public squares, most notably the Piazza dell'Anfiteatro, (site of the ancient Roman amphitheater), the Piazzale Verdi, the Piazza Napoleone, and the Piazza San Michele.

=== Palaces and villas ===
- Ducal Palace – Built on the site of Castruccio Castracani's fortress. Construction began under Bartolomeo Ammannati (1577–1582) and was continued by Filippo Juvarra in the 18th century.
- Pfanner Palace – A Baroque palace known for its formal garden and monumental staircase.
- Villa Garzoni – Located in nearby Collodi, noted for its elaborate water gardens.
- Palazzo Cenami – A Renaissance palace formerly owned by the prominent Arnolfini family.
- Palazzo Galli Tassi – Former hospital turned into a courthouse.

=== Towers and historic houses ===
- Guinigi Tower and House – Famous for its rooftop oak trees and panoramic city views.
- Torre delle Ore ("The Clock Tower") – The tallest tower in Lucca, offering views over the historic center.
- Casa di Puccini – Birthplace of composer Giacomo Puccini, located in nearby Torre del Lago where he spent summers. A Puccini opera festival is held there annually from July to August.

=== Museums and cultural institutions ===
- National Museum of Villa Guinigi – Hosts collections of medieval and Renaissance art.
- National Museum of Palazzo Mansi – A former noble residence now exhibiting artworks and period furnishings.
- Orto Botanico Comunale di Lucca – The municipal botanical garden, established in 1820.
- Academy of Sciences (1584) – One of the oldest scientific academies in Italy.
- Teatro del Giglio – A 19th-century opera house still in active use.

=== Churches ===
There are many medieval, some as old as the 8th century, basilica-form churches in Lucca, characterized by richly arcaded façades and campaniles.

- Chiesa dei Crocifisso dei Bianchi – 14th century church, now deconsecrated and closed, located on Via del Crocifisso
- Duomo di San Martino – St Martin's Cathedral, main church of Lucca.
- San Michele in Foro – Romanesque church built on the ancient Roman forum.
- San Giusto – Romanesque church with a simple façade.
- Basilica di San Frediano – Early Christian basilica with a golden mosaic façade.
- Sant'Alessandro – Example of medieval classicism.
- Santa Giulia – Originally Lombard, rebuilt in the 13th century.
- San Michele (Antraccoli) – Founded in 777, enlarged in the 12th century; features a 16th-century portico.
- San Giorgio (Brancoli) – Built in the late 12th century; includes a Lombard-Romanesque bell tower, Romanesque pulpit (1194), octagonal font, and sculpted altar.
- San Lorenzo di Moriano – 12th-century parish church in Romanesque style.
- San Romano – Erected by Dominicans in the late 13th century; now deconsecrated and located on Piazza San Romano.

== Education ==
Since 2005, Lucca hosts IMT School for Advanced Studies Lucca, a selective graduate and doctoral school which is part of the Italian superior graduate school system. Its main educational facilities are located at the San Francesco Convent Complex and Campus, and the former Renaissance-style Roman Catholic church of San Ponziano now hosts the university library.

== Sports ==
Association football arrived in Lucca in 1905 and has its roots in Brazil, thanks to a number of fans that helped found the club who had learned the game in Brazil. The Lucchese 1905, or simply Lucchese, plays in Serie D, the fourth tier of Italian football, having last been in top tier Serie A in 1952. The club plays its home games at Stadio Porta Elisa, just outside the northeast wall of the city.

== Transportation ==
=== Buses ===
Consorzio Lucchese Autotrasporti Pubblici, also known as CLAP, was established in 1969, as the main company in the Province of Lucca to manage the local public transport. In 2005, following the decision of the Region to assign the local public transport to a single operator for each of the 14 lots constituted, CLAP merged with the companies Lazzi and C.LU.B. Scpa to form the consortium VaiBus which was absorbed by the newly formed company CTT Nord in 2012. VaiBus was part of ONE Scarl the consortium holder of the two-year (2018-2019) contract for the management of the TPL throughout the Region.

Since 1 November 2021 the public local transport is managed by Autolinee Toscane.

== Notable people ==
- St. Anselm of Lucca (1036–1086), bishop of Lucca
- Andrea Stefani (composer) (1375-1460), monk and composer
- Giovanni Arnolfini (1400–1472), merchant and patron of the arts
- Laura Guidiccioni (1550–1597), noblewoman and poet
- Pompeo Batoni (1708–1787), painter
- Giovanni Antonio Bianchi (1686–1768), friar, theologian, and poet
- Simone Bianchi (born 1972), comics artist
- Luigi Boccherini (1743–1805), musician and composer
- Elisa Bonaparte (1777–1820), ruler of Lucca
- Anthony Bonvisi (1470s–1558), merchant and banker in London
- Giulio Carmassi (born 1981), pop musician
- Castruccio Castracani (1316–1328), ruler of Lucca
- Alfredo Catalani (1854–1893), composer
- Gusmano Cesaretti (born 1944), photographer and artist
- Mario Cipollini (born 1967), cyclist
- Alfredo Ciucci (1920–?), football player
- Matteo Civitali (1436–1501), sculptor
- Ivan Della Mea (1940–2009), singer-songwriter
- Theodoric Borgognoni (1205–1296/8), medieval surgeon
- Marco Antonio Franciotti (1592–1666), bishop of Lucca
- Ernesto Filippi (born 1950), football referee
- Saint Frediano (6th century), Irish prince and hermit, bishop of Lucca
- St. Gemma Galgani, mystic and saint
- Francesco Geminiani (1687–1762), musician and composer
- Giovanni Battista Giusti (c.1624–c.1693), harpsichord maker
- Gioseffo Guami (1542–1611), composer
- Leo I (died 1079), saint
- Pope Lucius III (1097–1185)
- Vincenzo Lunardi (1754–1806), aeronautical pioneer aeronaut
- Ludovico Marracci (1612–1700), priest and first translator of the Qur'an into Latin
- Felice Matteucci (1808–1887), engineer
- Mazzino Montinari (1928–1986), germanicist and Nietzsche scholar
- Italo Meschi (1887–1957), harp guitarist, poet, anarchist-pacifist
- Julian Niccolini, restaurateur
- Leo Nomellini (1924–2000), athlete
- Mario Pannunzio (1910–1968), journalist and politician
- Marcello Pera (born 1943), politician and philosopher
- Giacomo Puccini (1858–1924), composer
- Eros Riccio (born 1977), chess player
- Marco Rossi, footballer
- Daniele Rugani (born 1994), footballer
- Renato Salvatori (1933–1988), actor
- Carlo Sforza (1872–1952), diplomat and politician
- Pellegrino Tomeoni (1721–1816), composer and organist
- Rinaldo and Ezilda Torre, founded the Torani syrup company in San Francisco using Luccan recipes from their hometown
- Nicola Fanucchi (born 1964), actor and director
- Rolando Ugolini (1924–2014), athlete
- Giuseppe Ungaretti (1888–1970), poet
- Antonio Vallisneri (1661–1730), scientist and physician
- Alfredo Volpi (1896–1988), painter
- Hugh of Lucca (1160–c.1259), medieval surgeon
- Saint Zita (c.1212–1272), saint
- Daniele Ghilardi (born 2003), footballer

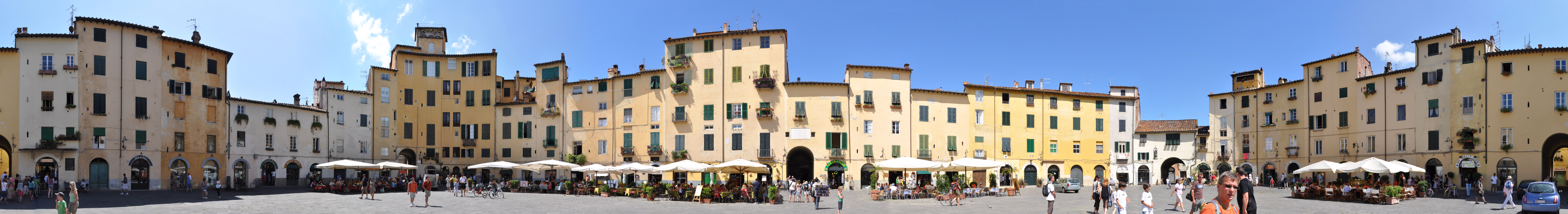
Piazza dell'Anfiteatro

== Sister cities ==
Lucca is twinned with:

- Abingdon, England, United Kingdom
- Colmar, France
- Gorinchem, The Netherlands
- Hämeenlinna, Finland
- Schongau, Germany
- Sint-Niklaas, Belgium
- South San Francisco, United States

== See also ==
- Castruccio Castracani
- Duchy of Lucca
- Republic of Lucca
- Walls of Lucca
- Cimitero di Sant'Anna (Lucca Monumental Cemetery, Italian Wikipedia)
