= Bertolome Zorzi =

Italian composer

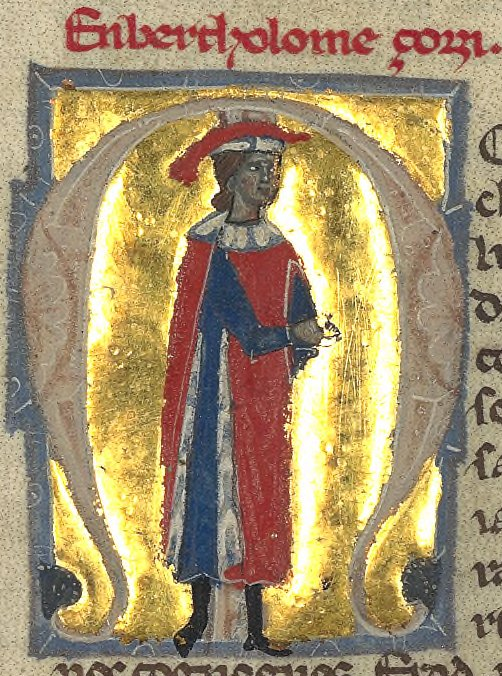
Zorzi, from an Italian MS of the 13th century, forming the central stroke of the "M" in the first line of Mout fort me sui d'un chant mervaillatz.

Bertolome Zorzi (Latin: Bartolomeus Gorgis; fl. 1266–1273) was a Venetian nobleman, merchant, and troubadour. Like all Lombard troubadours, he composed in the Occitan language. Eighteen of his works survive.

According to his vida, while travelling with a large band of merchants to the Byzantine Empire, they were captured by the Republic of Genoa, which was then at war with the Republic of Venice, and taken prisoner to Genoa. There Zorzi composed many songs from prison and even collaborated on some tensos with Bonifaci Calvo, a native Genoese troubadour. In response to a sirventes in which Bonifaci blamed the Genoese for allowing the Venetians to gain the upper hand and insult them, Zorzi composed the sirventes Molt me sui fort d'un chant merveillatz ("I was very much surprised by a song") justifying Venice. The response convinced Bonifaci and the two became friends.

Upon the release of the prisoners when Venice and Genoa came to terms of peace (about seven years later), Bertolome returned to Venice and was rewarded by the Doge with the castellanies of Coron and Modon in the southwestern Morea. According to his vida, there he fell in love with a beautiful local noblewoman and spent the rest of his life.

Zorzi wrote a sestina entitled En tal dezir mos cors intra that alludes to the Perceval of Arthurian legend confessing to his uncle. Zorzi also has been cited as one of several troubadours who protested Alfonso X's refusal to rescue his brother the infante Henry from an Italian prison. In Mout fai sobrieira foli, each stanza of Zorzi's ends with a corresponding quotation from Peire Vidal's Quant hom es en autrui poder, whom he is defending from those who label him a "fool".

== Example ==
Bertolome Zorzi in prison

An example of Zorzi's use of metaphor:

Atressi cum lo camel
Ten hom ab pauca liuranda
Benigne e forz e fizel,
Si ben li dona turmen ...

Translation:

Like the camel which
can be kept alive on very little food
and will be meek and strong and faithful,
even when it is beaten ...

== Sources ==
- Archer, Robert. The Pervasive Image: The Role of Analogy in the Poetry of Ausias March. John Benjamins, 1985. ISBN 90-272-1727-0.
- Bampa, Alessandro (2020). "ZORZI, Bartolomeo". Dizionario Biografico degli Italiani (in Italian). Vol. 100: Vittorio Emanuele I–Zurlo. Rome: Istituto dell'Enciclopedia Italiana. ISBN 978-88-12-00032-6.
- Chambers, Frank M. An Introduction to Old Provençal Versification. Diane, 1985. ISBN 0-87169-167-1.
- Egan, Margarita (ed. and trans.) The Vidas of the Troubadours. New York: Garland, 1984. ISBN 0-8240-9437-9.
- Gardner, Edmund G. "The Holy Graal in Italian Literature." The Modern Language Review, Vol. 20, No. 4. (Oct., 1925), pp. 443–453.
- Kinkade, Richard P. "Alfonso, X, Cantiga 235, and the Events of 1269–1278." Speculum, Vol. 67, No. 2. (Apr., 1992), pp. 284–323.
- Levy, Emil. Der Troubadour Bertolome Zorzi. Halle: Niemeyer, 1883.
- Elliott, A. M. Review of Der Troubadour Bertolome Zorzi by Emil Levy. In The American Journal of Philology, Vol. 5, No. 1. (1884), pp. 107–108.
- Strong, E. B. "The Rimado de palacio: López de Ayala's Rimed Confession." Hispanic Review, Vol. 37, No. 4. (Oct., 1969), pp. 439–451.
