= San Lorenzo di Moriano, Lucca =

Roman Catholic parish church in Tuscany, Italy

Coordinates: 43°53′47″N 10°31′12″E

San Lorenzo is a Romanesque-style, Roman Catholic parish church, located in the San Lorenzo di Moriano neighborhood outside of the city of Lucca in Tuscany, Italy.

== History ==
A church at the site was built in its present layout by the 12th century. The facade is simple and lacking decoration; the Stucco surface derives from recent centuries. The single nave leads to an apse with three mullioned windows. In 1468, the church lost the title of parish church to the nearby church of San Michele, now renamed Santi Michele e Lorenzo Much of the decoration was transferred to the new parish.
