= Palazzo Pfanner =

Coordinates: 43°50′46.14″N 10°30′11.87″E

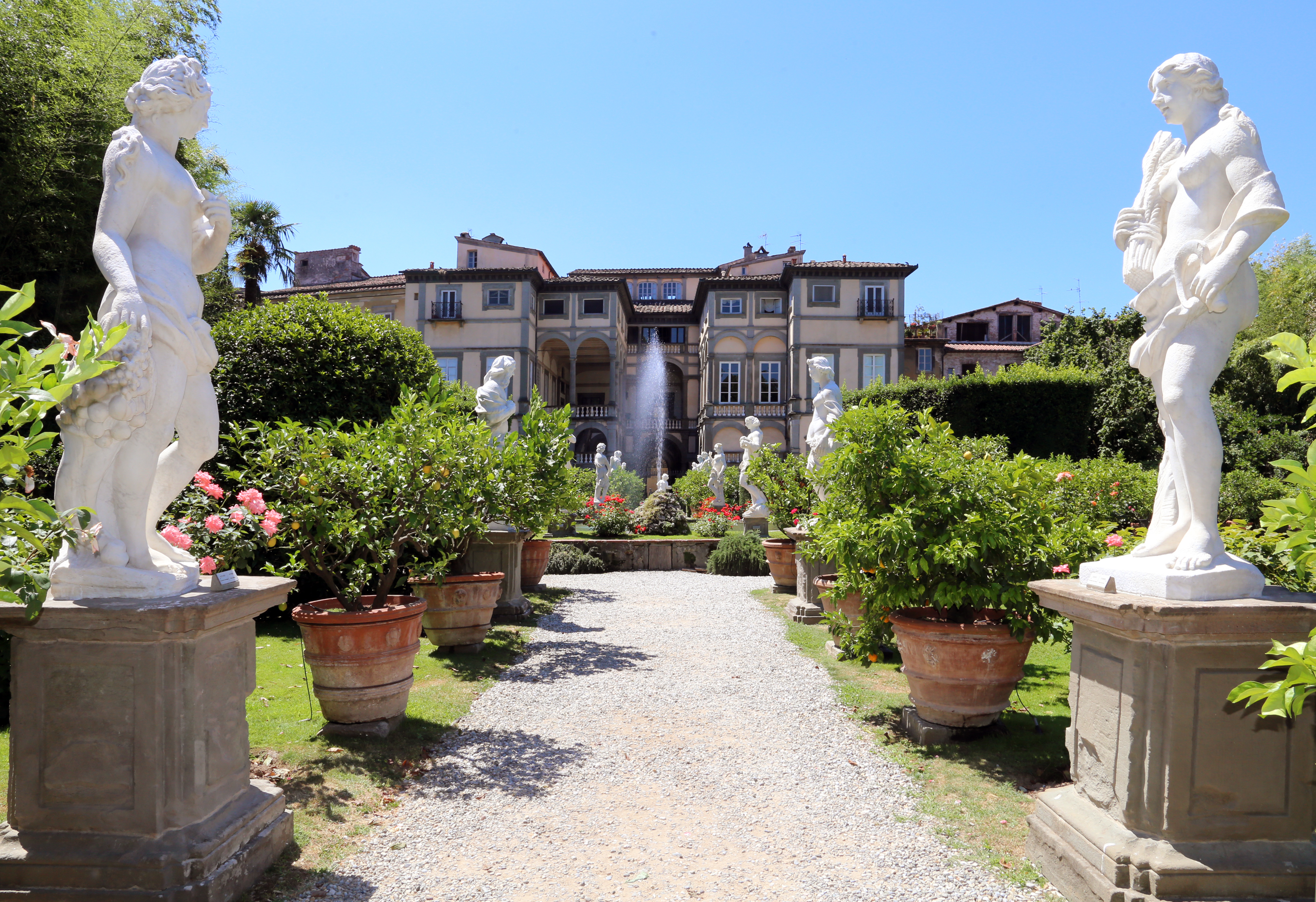
Palazzo Pfanner, garden view.

Palazzo Pfanner is a palace and a garden in Lucca, Italy, now converted into a museum of art and artifacts. Originally known as the Palazzo Controni, the building dates to 1667, and is notable mainly for its fine garden, attributed to Filippo Juvarra, and an interesting external stairway with loggia.

Its principal salon contains frescoes by Scorsini and De Santi (early to mid 18th century), as well as a collection of surgical instruments gathered by Dr. Pietro Pfanner (1864–1935).

== Bibliography ==
- Bedini, Gilbert (2006). The Villas of Lucca. Melbourne: Images Publishing. ISBN 2353402224
