= Santi Crocifisso dei Bianchi, Lucca =

Church building in Lucca, Italy

Coordinates: 43.84264°N 10.49847°E

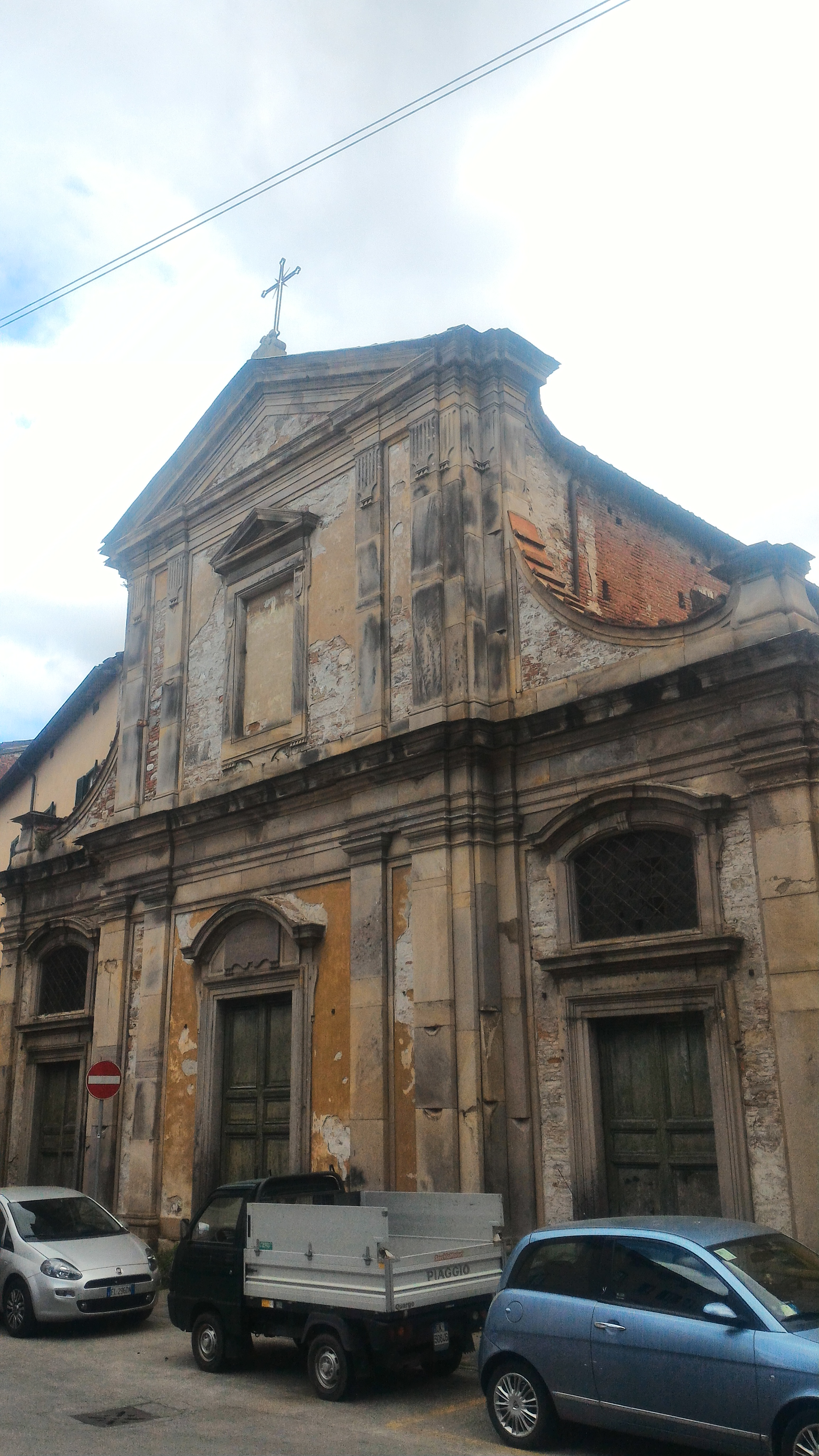
Santi Crocifisso dei Bianchi

Santi Crocifisso dei Bianchi is a Roman Catholic church located on Via del Crocifisso, in Lucca, region of Tuscany, Italy

The church's named derives from the a fraternity of flagellants, called Penitenti Bianchi, formed in the 14th century. They had a particular devotion to a wooden crucifix located in the church of San Romano in Lucca.

The church was refurbished in 1761 by Francesco Pini; the interior split into three naves, and decorated with frescoes by Lorenzo Castellotti. The main altar built at the end of the 17th century. The church in 2015 is presently deconsecrated and closed. Previously called San Benedetto in Palazzo; it once housed two canvases: an Assumption by Giuseppe Ribera and a Martydrom of St Bartholomew by Pompeo Batoni. The crucifix from the church is now in the chapel of the Archbishop's palace.
