= Bonifaci Calvo =

Italian composer

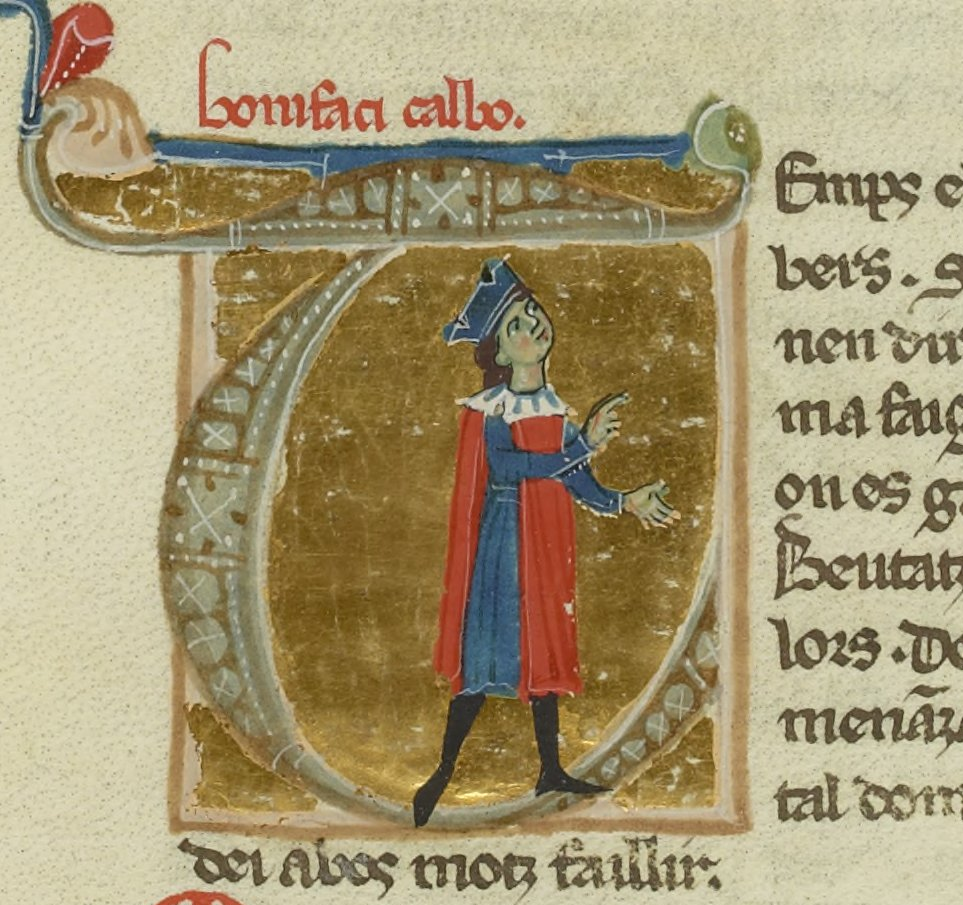
Bonifaci Calvo in a 13th-century chansonnier.

Bonifaci, Bonifatz, or Bonifacio Calvo (fl. 1253–1266) was a Genoese troubadour of the late thirteenth century. The only biographical account of (part of) his life is found in the vida of Bertolome Zorzi. He is, however, the most notable Genoese troubadour after Lanfranc Cigala. In total, nineteen of his poems and two descorts have survived.

Bonifaci is known to have spent most of his career at the court of Alfonso X of Castile, where the prevailing language was Galician-Portuguese. He wrote primarily in Occitan, concentrating on sirventes in imitation of Bertran de Born, but he did take up the court language and wrote two cantigas de amor and a multilingual poem. He wrote one sirventes encouraging Alfonso to go to war with Henry III of England over Gascony, an event which provides a reliable date for the work's composition (1253–1254). Outside of sirventes, he composed love songs in the style of Arnaut Daniel, but his most lauded work is a planh on the death of his lady.

The notion that Bonifaci had been knighted by Ferdinand III of Castile and fell in love with Ferdinand's niece Berenguela, which inspired him to compose in Galician-Portuguese, is legendary, being based on an unreliable passage of Jean de Nostredame.

In 1266 Bonifaci returned to Lombardy. He continued composing in Occitan, producing two descorts with Scotto and Luquet Gattulus. During a war between Genoa and Venice, Bonifaci composed a sirventes, "Ges no m'es greu, s'ieu non sui ren prezatz" (It matters little to me if I am not esteemed), in which he blamed the Genoese for allowing themselves to be defeated the Venetians and insulting the latter. In response, Bertolome Zorzi, a Venetian prisoner of war, wrote "Molt me sui fort d'un chant mer[a]veillatz" (I was very much surprised by a song), defending his country's conduct and blaming Genoa for the war. According to Bertolome's vida, Bonifaci was convinced by Bertolome's poem and the two became friends. They composed many tensos together.

== Sources ==
- Cabré, Miriam. "Italian and Catalan troubadours" (pp. 127–140). The Troubadours: An Introduction. Simon Gaunt and Sarah Kay, edd. Cambridge: Cambridge University Press, 1999. ISBN 0-521-57473-0.
- Egan, Margarita, ed. and trans. The Vidas of the Troubadours. New York: Garland, 1984. ISBN 0-8240-9437-9.
- Keller, Hans-Erich. "Bonifacio Calvo." Medieval Italy: An Encyclopedia. Christopher Kleinhenz, ed. New Jersey: Routledge, 2004. ISBN 0-415-93931-3.
- Lang, H. R. "The Relations of the Earliest Portuguese Lyric School with the Troubadours and Trouvères." Modern Language Notes, 10:4 (Apr:1895), pp. 104–116.
