= Palazzo Cenami =

Coordinates: 43.842569°N 10.503728°E

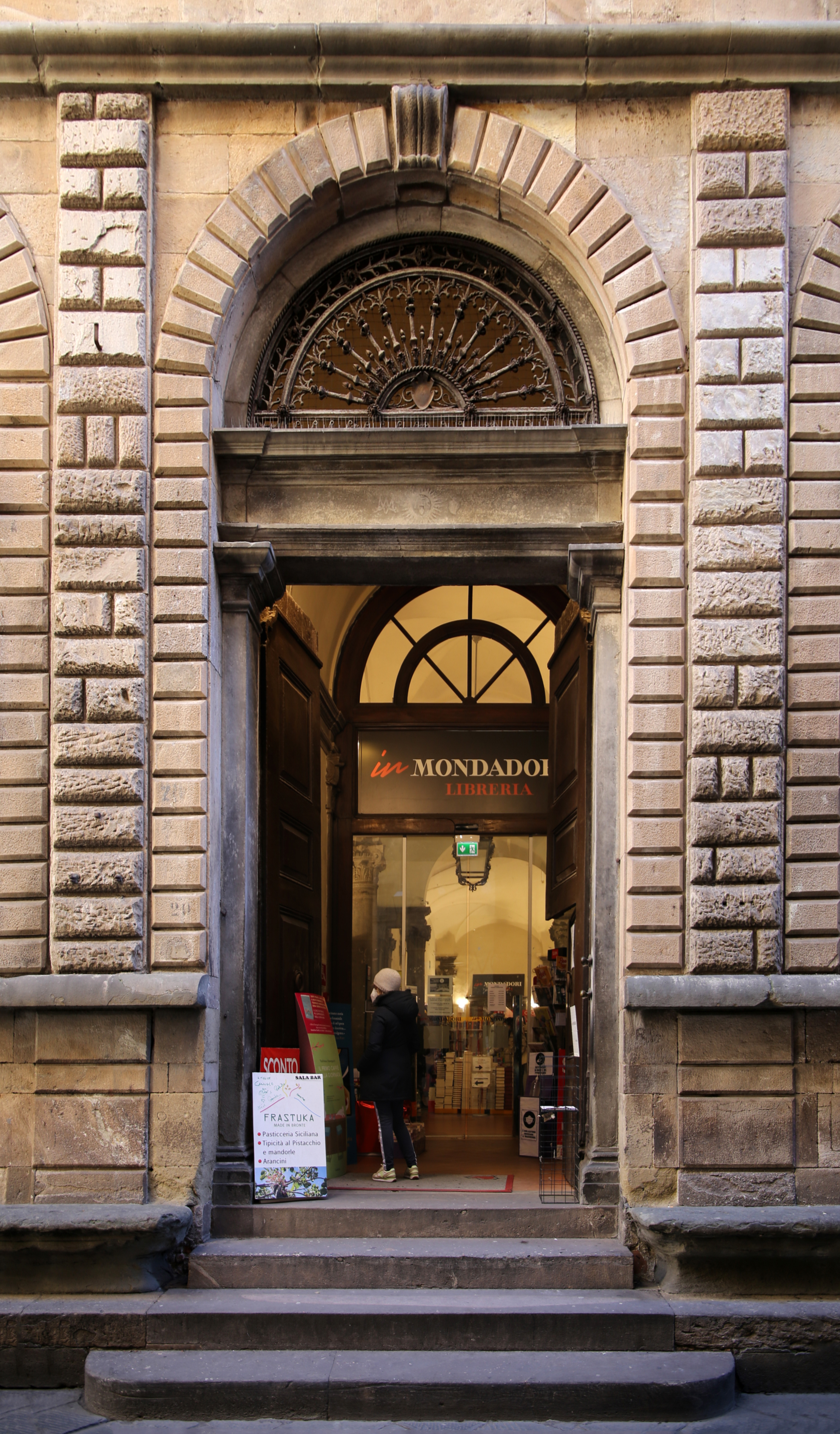
Palazzo Cenami

The Palazzo Cenami is a Renaissance-style palace located on Via Santa Croce in central Lucca, region of Tuscany, Italy. The palace was designed in 1530 by Nicolao Civitali. Some attribute the palace's Florentine style of architecture to Agostino Marti in 1501.
