= Piazza dell'Anfiteatro =

Public square in Tuscany, Italy

Coordinates: 43.8454°N 10.5063°E

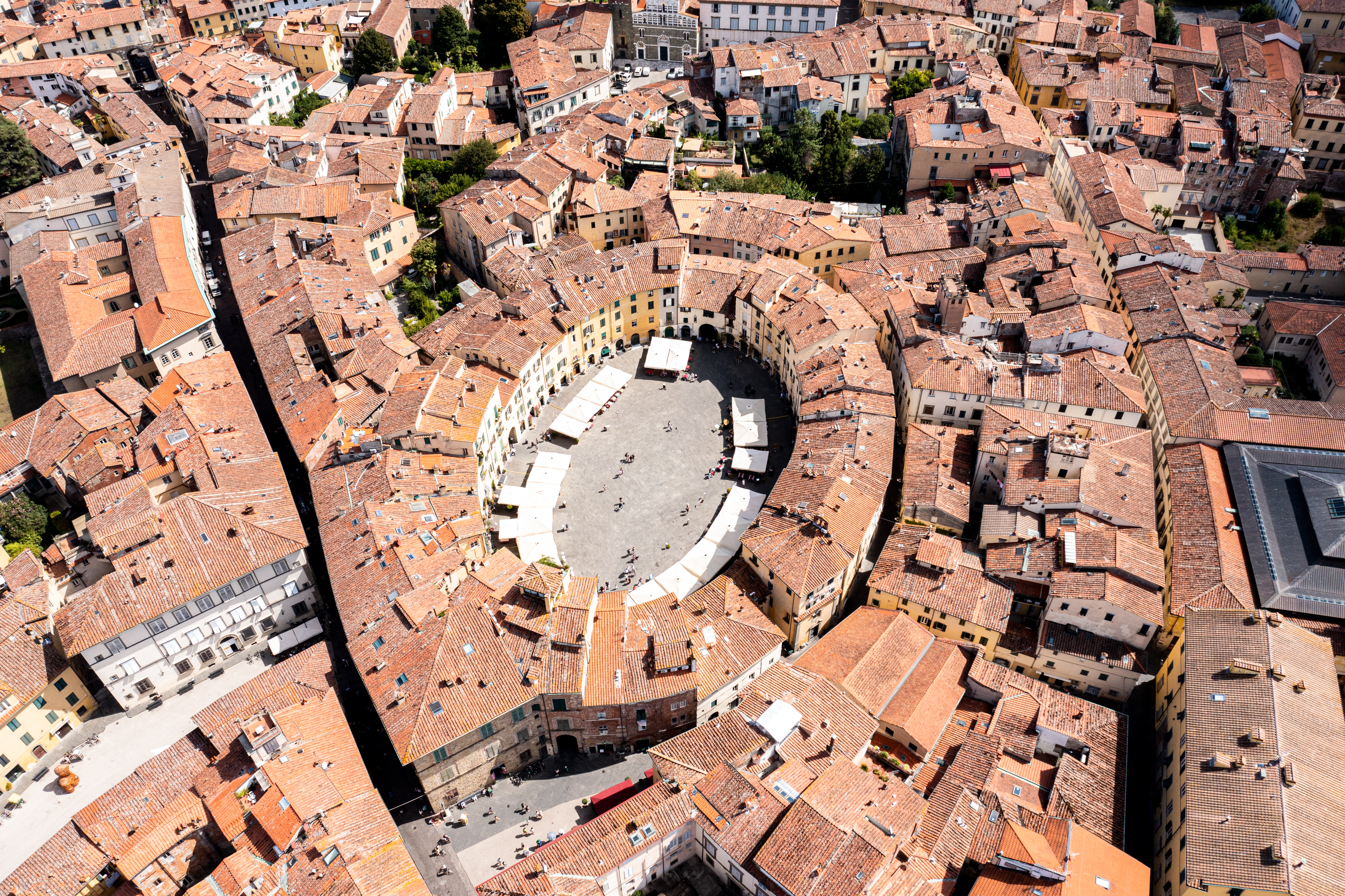
Aerial view of Piazza dell'Anfiteatro

Piazza dell'Anfiteatro is a public square in the northeast quadrant of the walled center of Lucca, region of Tuscany, Italy. The ring of buildings surrounding the square follows the elliptical shape of the former second century Roman amphitheater of Lucca. The square can be reached through four gateways located at the four vertices of the ellipse. A Cross is carved into the central tile of the square with the arms pointing to the four gateways of the square.

== History ==
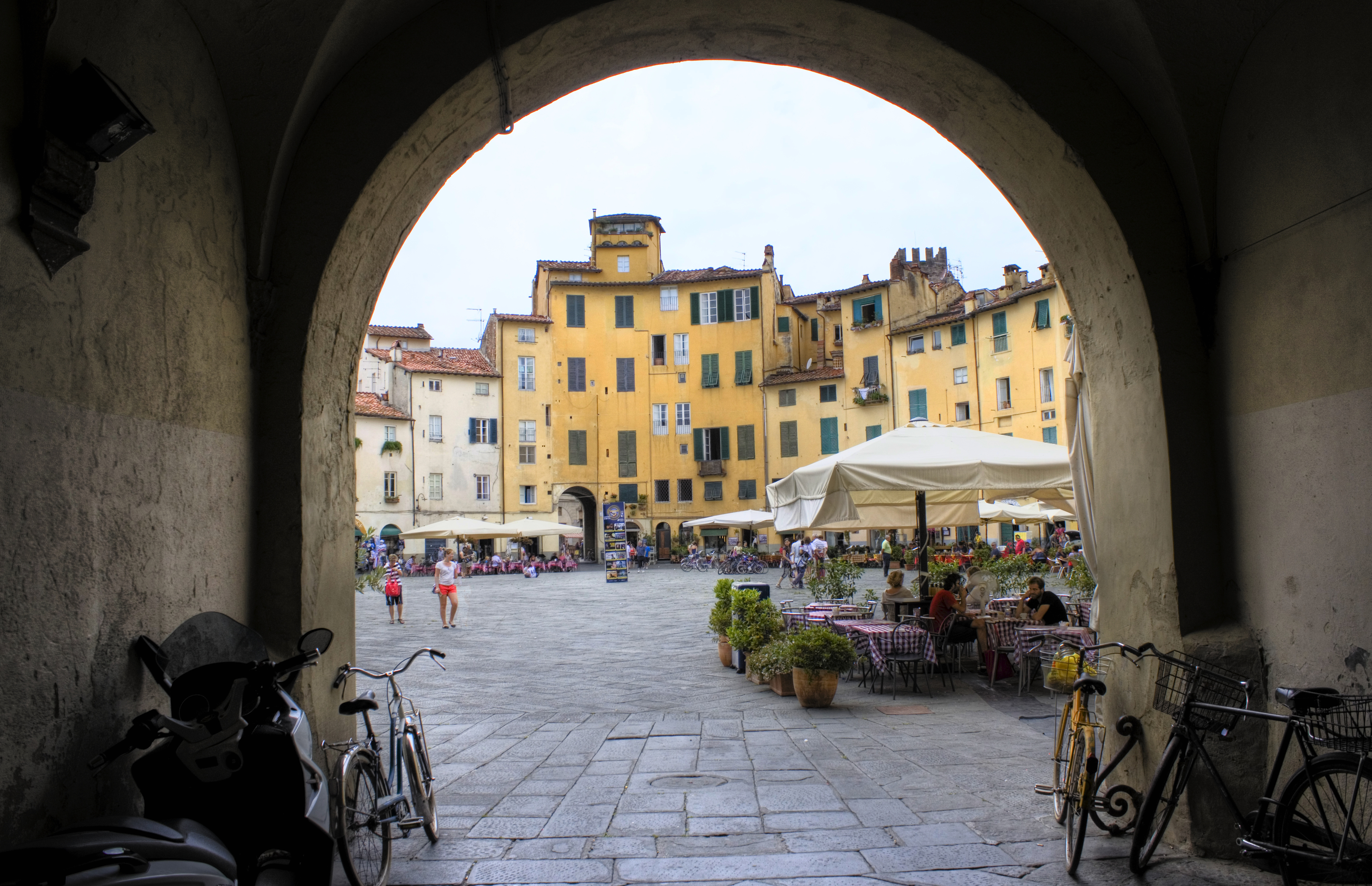
The square as seen from one of its four gateways

The base of the former amphitheater (dating back to the 1st or 2nd century BC) is now some 3 meters below the ground surface.

At its peak about 18 rows of amphitheater seats held some 10,000 spectators. Now at its place is an urban square (piazza) surrounded by private residences built using the remaining structures of the Amphitheatre, which are occupied by several outdoor cafes. This piazza was created in 1830 by the architect Lorenzo Nottolini by razing some of the buildings inside the oval. It was originally refurbished to be a marketplace.

== See also ==
- List of Roman amphitheatres
