= Guinigi Tower =

Landmark in Lucca, Italy

Coordinates: 43.84371°N 10.50701°E

The Torre Guinigi is a tower in Lucca in the region of Tuscany, central Italy. It is a typical example of local Romanesque-Gothic architecture. The height of the tower is 45 metres (148 ft) with a total of 230 steps over 28 flights to reach the top.

The tower dates from the latter half of the 14th century, when a number of wealthy families were building towers within Lucca's walls as status symbols. The Guinigis were a wealthy family of merchants and bankers. It is one of the few remaining towers within the city. It is known for the holm oaks growing on top of the tower.

The tower was donated to the city in 1968 by the descendants of the Guinigi family. It is open to the public.

== Gallery ==
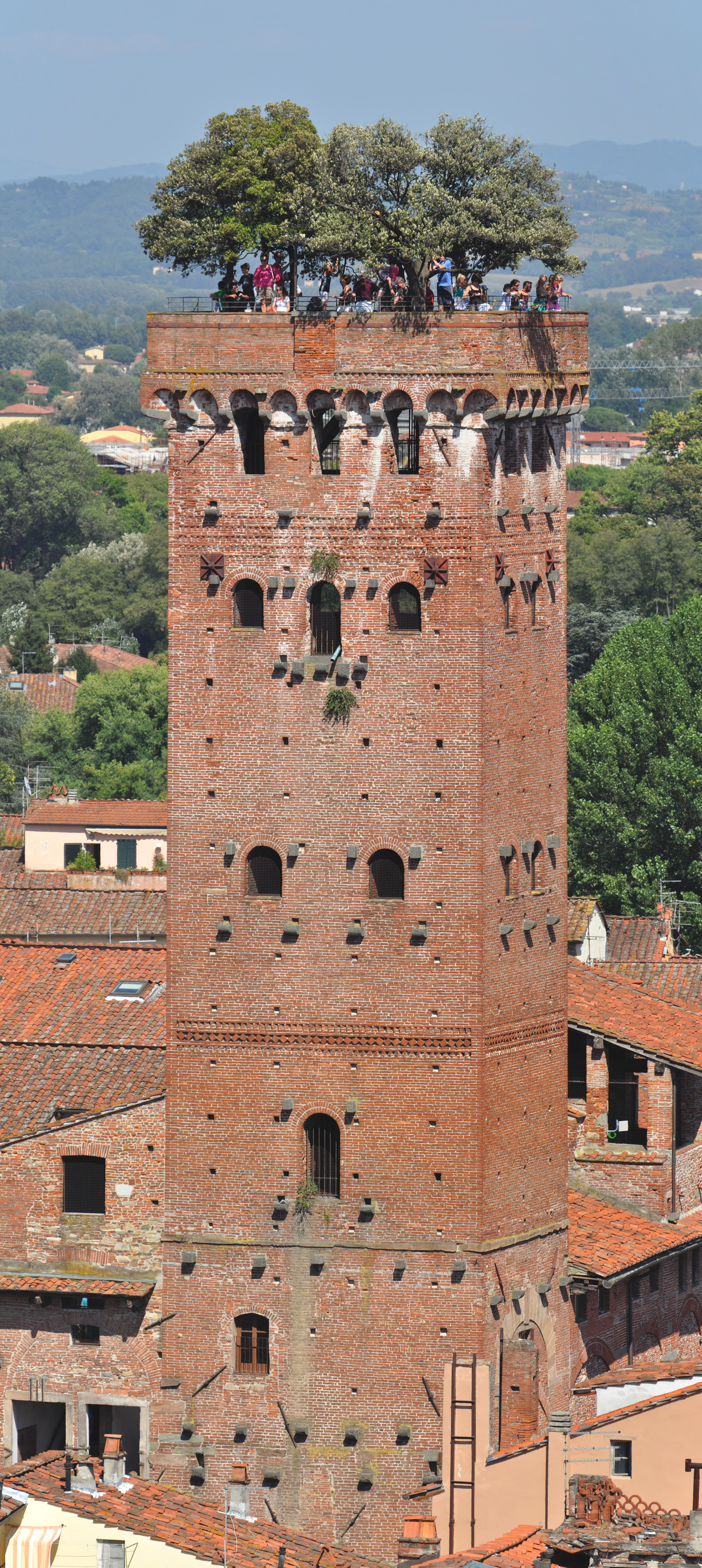
Guinigi Tower seen from the Torre delle Ore

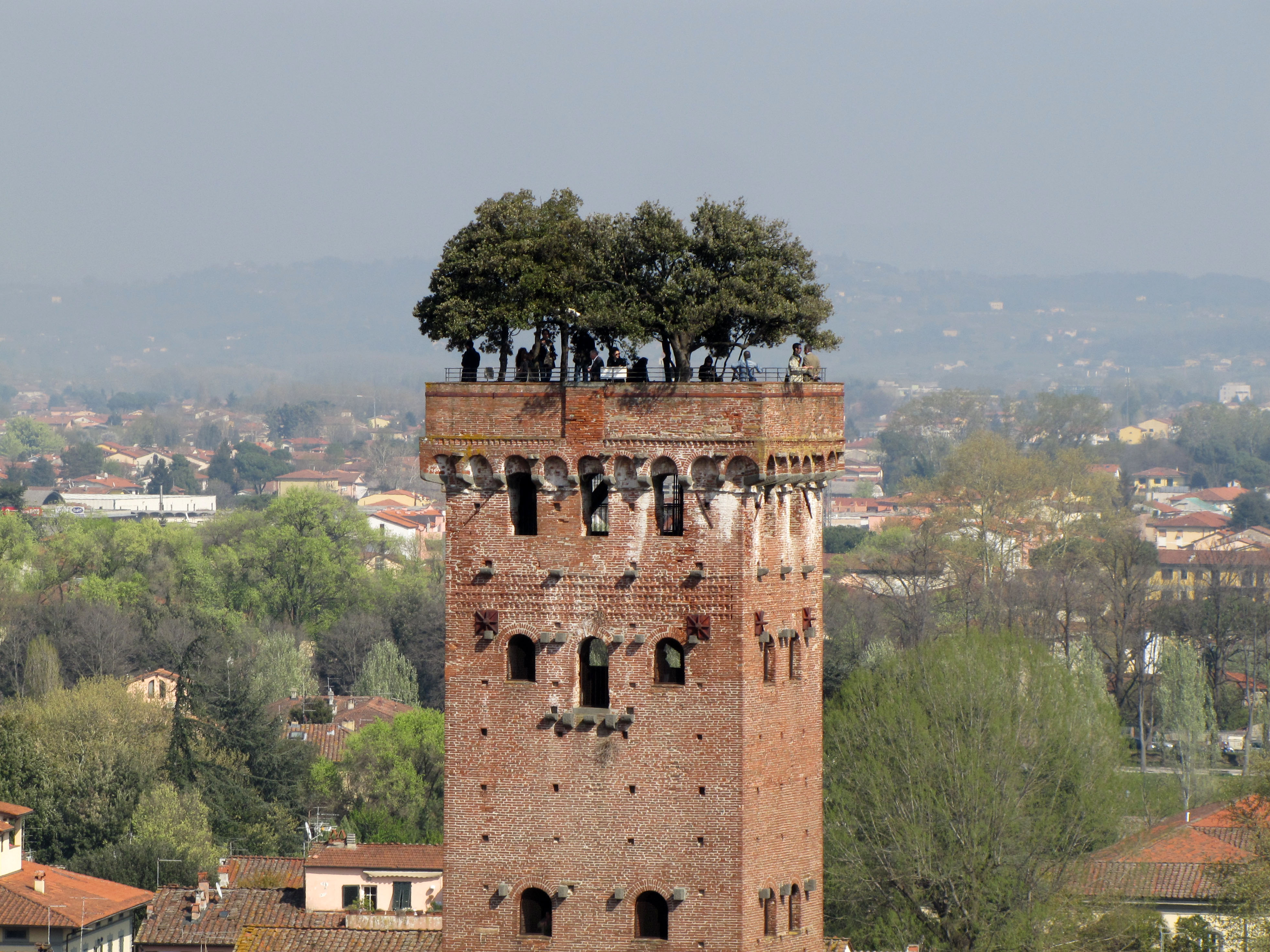
Hanging garden on the roof of the Torre Guinigi
