= Luchetto Gattilusio =

Genoese diplomat

Luchetto Gattilusio (fl. 1248–1307) was a Genoese statesman, diplomat, and man of letters. As a Guelph he played an important role in wider Lombard politics and as a troubadour in the Occitan language he composed three poems descriptive of his times.

== Poetry ==
The earliest written references to Luchetto are in a series of notarial instruments dating to 1248, 1251, 1252, 1267, and 1287. His earliest activity, however, was probably his literary work. The only complete work which can be surely assigned to his authorship is D'un sirventes m'es granz volontatz preza, a sirventes dated to between 1262 and 1264. It is preserved in a famous chansonnier compiled by Bernart Amoros. It was written while Charles of Anjou was in Italy preparing to make good on his Papally-sanctioned claim to the Kingdom of Sicily. Luchetto was a staunch supporter of Charles of Anjou and his sirventes encourages the would-be king to follow the example of his namesake:

E pois lo noms de Carle en liu es
Sega.ls seus faitz q'estiers a tort seria
Per sel clamatz qe valc, s'el non valia.

Translation:

And because he has the name of Charlemagne
He therefore follows him in deeds rather than
Be called wrong for not being worthy of it.

Aside from his above work there is another sirventes, Cora q'eu fos marritz ni conziros, directed at fellow Italian troubadour Sordello, which only survives in fragments and which is sometimes assigned to Luchetto, sometimes to fellow Genoese Lanfranc Cigala. Another work by Luchetto, Luchetz, se.us platz mais amar finamen, a tenso with another Genoese troubadour, Bonifaci Calvo, which must have been written after Calvo's return to Genoa in 1266, exists incompletely. In the various manuscripts in which are preserved these works, Luchetto's name appears Occitanised as Luchetz, Luqetz, or Luquet and Gateluz or Gatelus.

== Diplomat and statesman ==
Luchetto's first diplomatic activity occurred in 1266, when he acted as an ambassador from Genoa to Pope Clement IV and Charles of Anjou. In 1270 he was assigned by the Angevins to "examine" the government of the podestà Orlando Putagio in Parma. His first major political assignment is related in the Chronicon of Pietro Cantinelli under the year 1272: Dominus Luchittus de Cataluxiis de Janua fuit potestas Bononiae ("Lord Luchetto Gattilusio of Genoa made podestà of Bologna"). Luchetto was still acting as Guelph podestà of Bologna on 6 March 1277, when Enzo of Sardinia, son of the Emperor Frederick II and long languishing in a Bolognese prison, dictated his testament in the presence of nobili viro Luchitto de Gatalusiis cive januensi Bonon. Praetore ("nobleman Luchetto Gattilusio, citizen of Genoa, praetor of Bologna," praetor being synonymous with podestà at that time). The next year (1273), however, he was also capitano del popolo of Lucca under Charles. He was still at Lucca in 1277.

In 1282 Luchetto served a term as podestà of Milan. Then, on 13 October 1284 he was a member of the Genoese delegation which reconfirmed the alliance between Genoa, Lucca, and Florence against Pisa. In 1295 he again acted as Genoese ambassador to the pope, this time Boniface VIII, and helped seal a peace with Venice. On that mission he also received a papal bull for a church he had built at Priano in Sestri Ponente. His last position of state was in Cremona, where he served as podestà in 1301. He appears in documents for the last time in 1307.

== Private life ==
Through his long and varied career Luchetto had acquired interests in property in Sardinia, and he appeared in documents of Nino Visconti, Judge of Gallura, and Ugolino della Gherardesca, capitano del popolo of Pisa. His literary interests may have taken him into contact with Brunetto Latini. Economically he exercised power over the market in Bologna for many years. Though his marital and familial relations are unknown, he did have a brother named Gattino and a daughter named Ilisina. He is not to be confused, however, with another podestà of the same name who ruled in Savona in 1301.

== Sources ==
- Bertoni, Giulio. I Trovatori d'Italia: Biografie, testi, tradizioni, note. Rome: Società Multigrafica Editrice Somu, 1967 [1915].
