= Scotto (troubadour) =

Italian troubadour

Scotto (English: Scot, Scott; Occitan: Scotz) was a troubadour from Genoa active in the mid-thirteenth century. His only surviving poem is a partimen (debate poem) with another Genoese troubadour, Bonifaci Calvo.

His identity is obscure. Scholars have suggested that he is to be identified with either Ogerio Scotto or Alberto Scotto. He has also been identified with Alberto Scotti, lord of Piacenza from 1290, but this is chronologically improbable. Giulio Bertoni further argues that troubadours were better known in poems by their given names. A document dated 25 September 1239 names four brothers of the Scotti family: Guglielmo, Corrado, Balbo and Scotto. Several scholars favour identifying the troubadour with this Scotto Scotti, who fits chronologically. He could have been written his lone surviving poem either before Calvo left Genoa around 1250 or after he returned in 1266.

Scotto's first response and Bonifaci's response in the 16th-century manuscript

Scotto and Bonifaci's poem, Scotz, quals mais vos plazeria, is known from a single manuscript, troubadour chansonnier a^{1}. It is a identified in the rubric as la tenzo den bonifaci e descot, meaning the tenso of Sir Boniface and Sir Scot. More specifically, it is a partimen or debate poem. The question is posed by Bonifaci:

Scot, which of these two agreeable forms of dalliance would pleas you more? Either you can do with your beloved all that you desire, bu she would on no account allow you to speak to her or see her and never as long as she lives will you be loved by her; or else you can see her and speak with her at any time, but she would never allow you to make love to her, nor are you to force her to do so.

Scot opts for physical intimacy:

Bonifaci, if I could have my lady, with all her beauty, at my disposal and hold her naked in my arms—even though I was unable to speak and the sight of her was forbidden me—I should be a fool if I did not take her on these conditions, for the power of speech and sight which you allow me would double my anguish if the ultimate favour was withheld.

As a non-native speaker, Scotto's grasp of Old Occitan is somewhat imperfect.

== Sources ==
- Bertoni, Giulio (1915). I Trovatori d'Italia: Biografie, testi, tradizioni, note. Editore Cav. Umberto Orlandini.
- Harvey, Ruth; Paterson, Linda M. (2010). The Troubadour Tensos and Partimens: A Critical Edition. Boydell & Brewer.
- Horan, William David (1963). A Critical Edition of the Poems of Bonifacio Calvo (PhD dissertation). Louisiana State University and Agricultural and Mechanical College.
- Meliga, Walter (2006). "La tradizione manoscritta dei trovatori genovesi". In M. Lecco (ed.). Poeti e poesia a Genova (e dintorni) nell'età medievale: Atti del Convegno per Genova capitale della Cultura Europea 2004. Edizioni dell'Orso. pp. 151–162.
