= Scotstown (disambiguation) =

Scotstown is a village in County Monaghan, Ireland.

Scotstown may also refer to:

- Scotstown, Quebec, a city in Quebec, Canada
- Scotstown, County Tyrone, a townland in County Tyrone, Northern Ireland

== See also ==
- Scotstown Moor, a nature reserve in Aberdeen, Scotland
- Scotstown Primary School
- Scotstoun
