= Mannucci =

Mannucci is an Italian surname. Notable people with the surname include:

- Lucia Mannucci (1920–2012), Italian singer
- Filippo Mannucci (born 1974), Italian rower
- Gaspare Mannucci (1575–1642), Italian Baroque painter
- Paolo Mannucci (born 1942), Italian cyclist

== See also ==
- Carlos A. Mannucci, a Peruvian football club
- 2219 Mannucci, a main-belt asteroid

== See also ==
- Manucci
