= Manucci =

Manucci is an Italian surname. Notable people with the surname include:

- Amatino Manucci, inventor of double-entry bookkeeping
- Teobaldo Manucci (1449/1452 – 1515), Italian humanist, scholar, educator, and the founder of the Aldine Press
- Niccolao Manucci (1639–1717), Italian writer and traveller
- Paolo Manucci, or Mannucci (born 1942), Italian former racing cyclist
- Dan Manucci (born 1957), American football quarterback

== See also ==
- Mannucci
