= Gabella =

Gabella may refer to:

- Gabella, Calci, village in Tuscany, central Italy
- Grégory Gabella (born 1980), French high jumper
