= Pontegrande-Sant'Andrea =

- Frazione
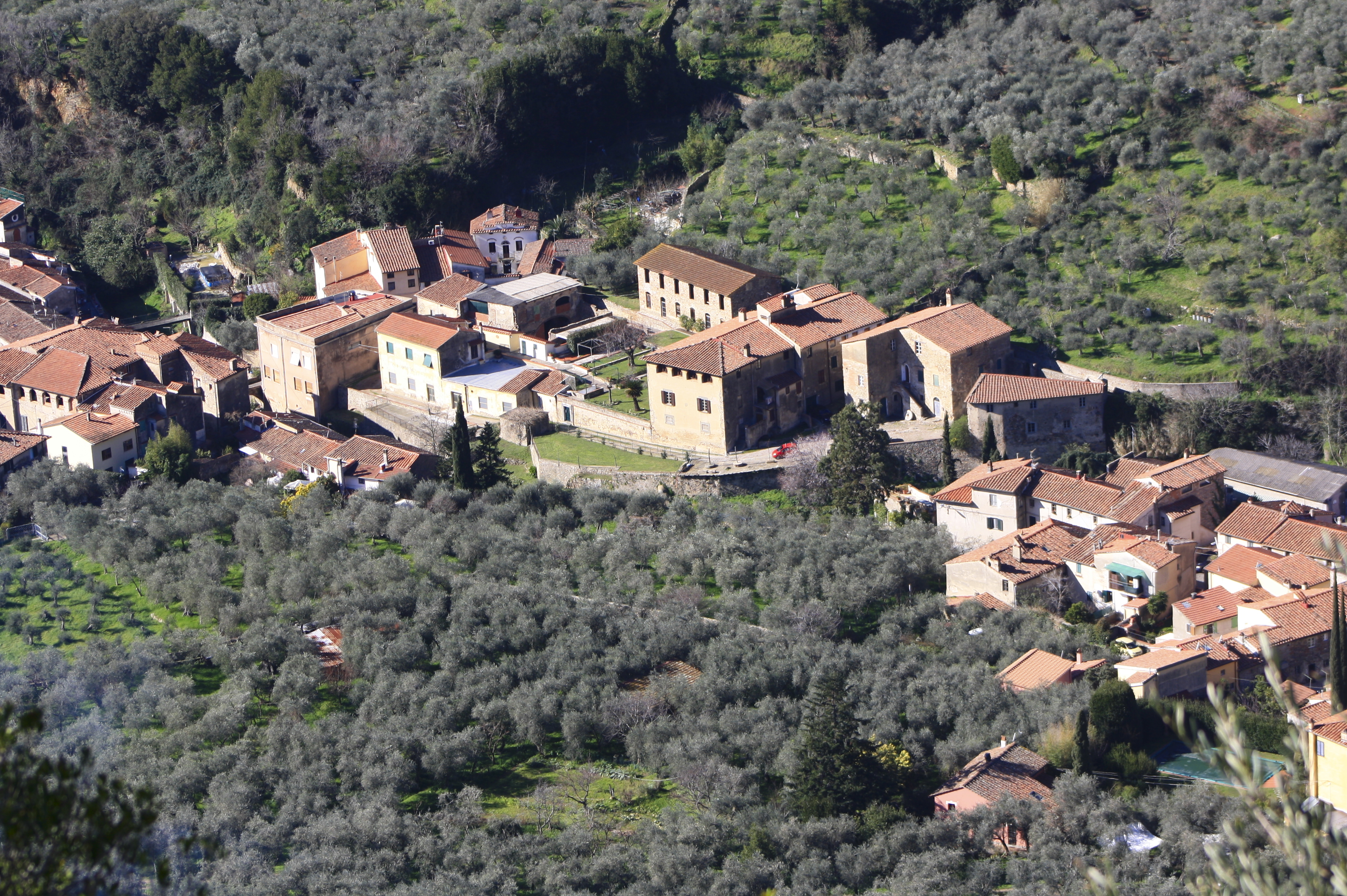

- Location of Pontegrande-Sant'Andrea in Italy
- Coordinates: 43°44′3″N 10°31′9″E
- Country: Italy
- Region: Tuscany
- Province: Pisa (PI)
- Comune: Calci
- Elevation: 80 m (260 ft)

Population
  - Total: 190
- Time zone: UTC+1 (CET)
  - Summer (DST): UTC+2 (CEST)
- Postal code: 56011
- Dialing code: (+39) 050

Pontegrande-Sant'Andrea is a village in Tuscany, central Italy, administratively a frazione of the comune of Calci, province of Pisa.

The village is composed by the two hamlets of Pontegrande and Sant'Andrea a Lama. It is about 11 km from Pisa and almost 1 km from the municipal seat of La Pieve in Calci.

== Bibliography ==
- Caciagli, Giuseppe (1972). Pisa e la sua provincia. Vol. 2. Pisa: Colombo Cursi Editore.
