= Il Colle-Villa =

- Frazione
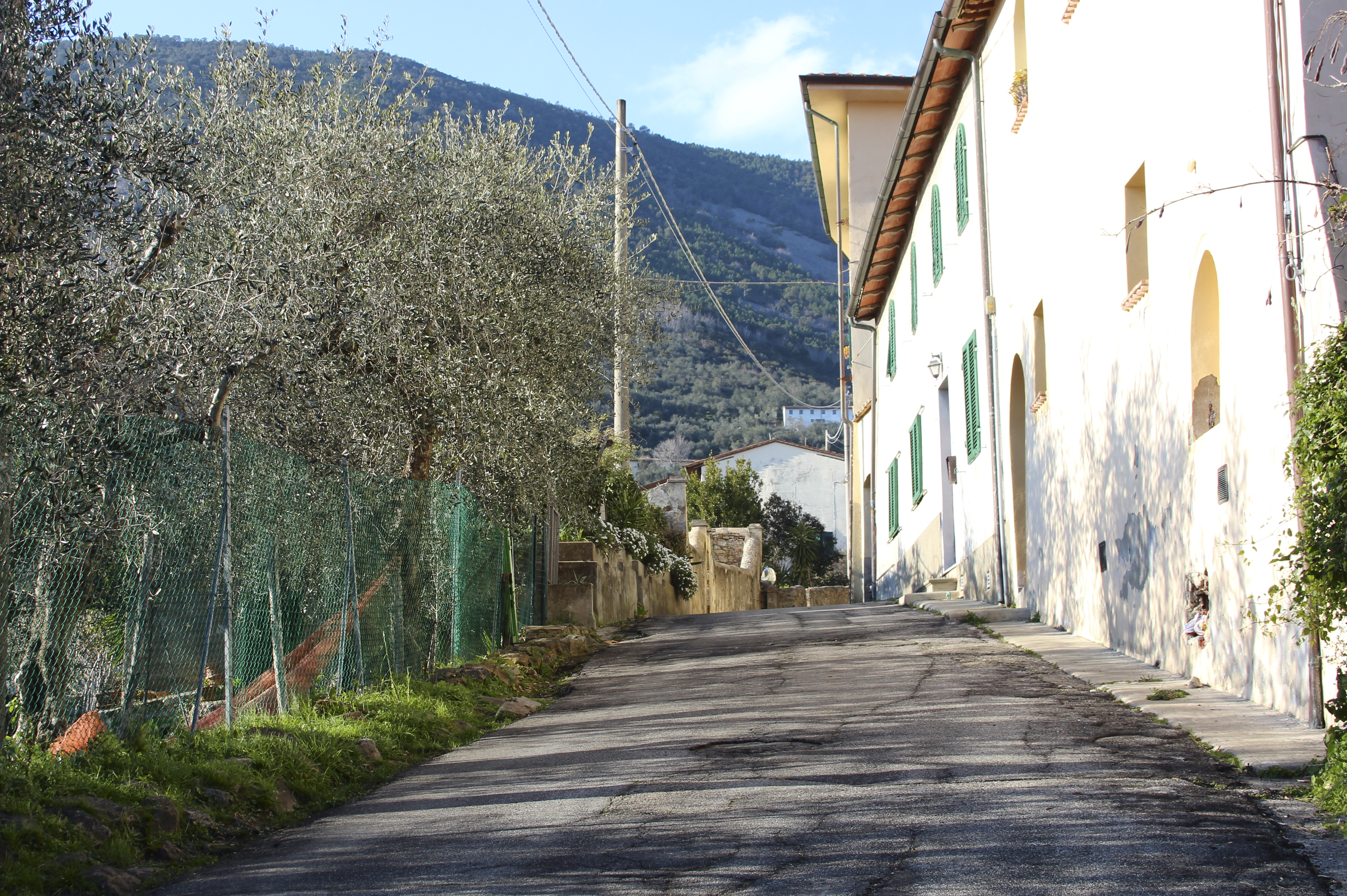
- Colle

- Location of Il Colle-Villa in Italy
- Coordinates: 43°44′05″N 10°30′59″E
- Country: Italy
- Region: Tuscany
- Province: Pisa (PI)
- Comune: Calci
- Elevation: 110 m (360 ft)

Population
  - Total: 155
- Time zone: UTC+1 (CET)
  - Summer (DST): UTC+2 (CEST)
- Postal code: 56011
- Dialing code: (+39) 050

Il Colle-Villa is a village in Tuscany, central Italy, administratively a frazione of the comune of Calci, province of Pisa.

The village is composed by the two hamlets of Il Colle (or Colle) and Villa. It is about 11 km from Pisa and 1 km from the municipal seat of La Pieve.

== Main sights ==
- Church of San Salvatore (parish church)
- Church of San Rocco

== Bibliography ==
- Caciagli, Giuseppe (1972). Pisa e la sua provincia. Vol. 2. Pisa: Colombo Cursi Editore.
