= Giorgio Gaber =

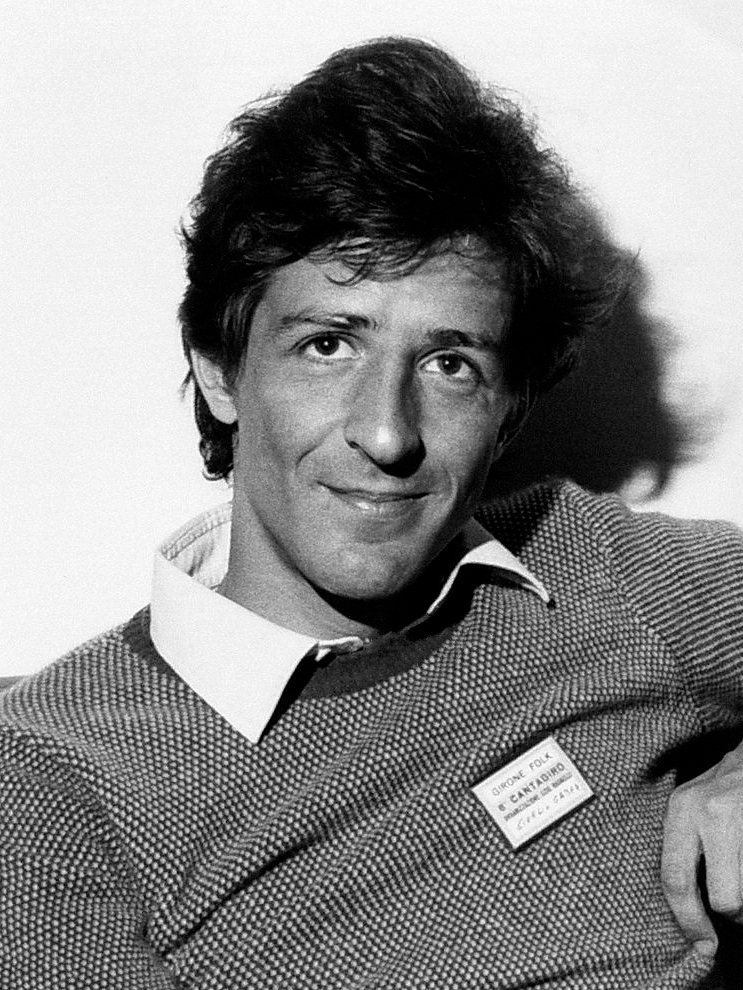
- Giorgio Gaber in 1969

Background information
- Born: Giorgio Gaberscik; 25 January 1939; Milan, Lombardy, Kingdom of Italy
- Died: 1 January 2003 (aged 63) Montemagno, Tuscany, Italy
- Genre: Teatro canzone ('song theatre')
- Occupations: Singer-songwriter; composer; actor; playwright; musician
- Instrument: Guitar
- Years active: 1958–2002
- Labels: Ricordi; Ri-Fi; Vedette; Carosello; Zodiaco
- Website: www.giorgiogaber.org

Giorgio Gaberscik (25 January 1939 – 1 January 2003), known as Giorgio Gaber (Italian: [ˈdʒordʒo ˈɡaːber]), was an Italian singer-songwriter, composer, actor, playwright, and musician. He was also an accomplished guitar player and author of one of the first rock songs in Italian ("Ciao ti dirò", 1958). With Sandro Luporini, he pioneered the musical genre known as teatro canzone ('song theatre').

== Biography ==
=== Debut ===
He was born in Milan, Lombardy, into a lower-middle-class family. His father, Guido Gaberščik, was born in Trieste when the city was still part of Austria-Hungary. The surname Gaberscik is of Slovene origin (Gaberščik). His mother was from the Veneto region. The two met and married in Veneto and later moved to Milan, where Giorgio was born.

Gaber began to play as rehabilitation for an injury to his hand, which required constant but not strenuous activity to recover his motor skills. Since his health as a child was not the best, and his older brother Marcello played guitar, he was encouraged to play as well. The outcome was good both in terms of his health and artistically, and at only fourteen years of age, he was engaged to play at a New Year's party and earned his first paycheck of 1,000 lire.

Subsequently, he began to frequent the Santa Tecla, a venue in Milan where he had the chance to meet musicians of the time, including Luigi Tenco, Gian Franco Reverberi, Adriano Celentano, Ricky Gianco, and Mogol, who obtained a contract for Gaber with Dischi Ricordi. He then played with the Rocky Mountains Old Time Stompers (replacing Tony Dallara who had left to pursue a solo career) and with Rolling Crew.

Because neither Tenco nor Gaber were yet members of the Italian Society of Authors and Publishers (SIAE), they could not trademark the song "Ciao ti dirò" (inspired by Elvis Presley's "Jailhouse Rock"), which was signed off by Giorgio Calabrese and Giampiero Reverberi despite being composed by Tenco and Gaber.

The two went on to continue writing music together, developing at the same time a close friendship. In 1958, they toured Germany together with Adriano Celentano, Enzo Jannacci, Paolo Tomelleri, and Gianfranco Reverberi.

Gaber paired up with Enzo Jannacci as I Due Corsari, who made their debut at the end of 1958 with two vinyl singles—"Come Facette Mammeta", a classic song of Neapolitan humour, and "Non occupatemi il telefono". They continued to release singles with Dischi Ricordi throughout the following year, and in 1960 released their first album, Giorgio Gaber – Enzo Jannacci.

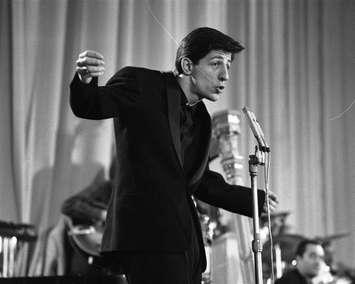
Gaber and at San Remo 1961

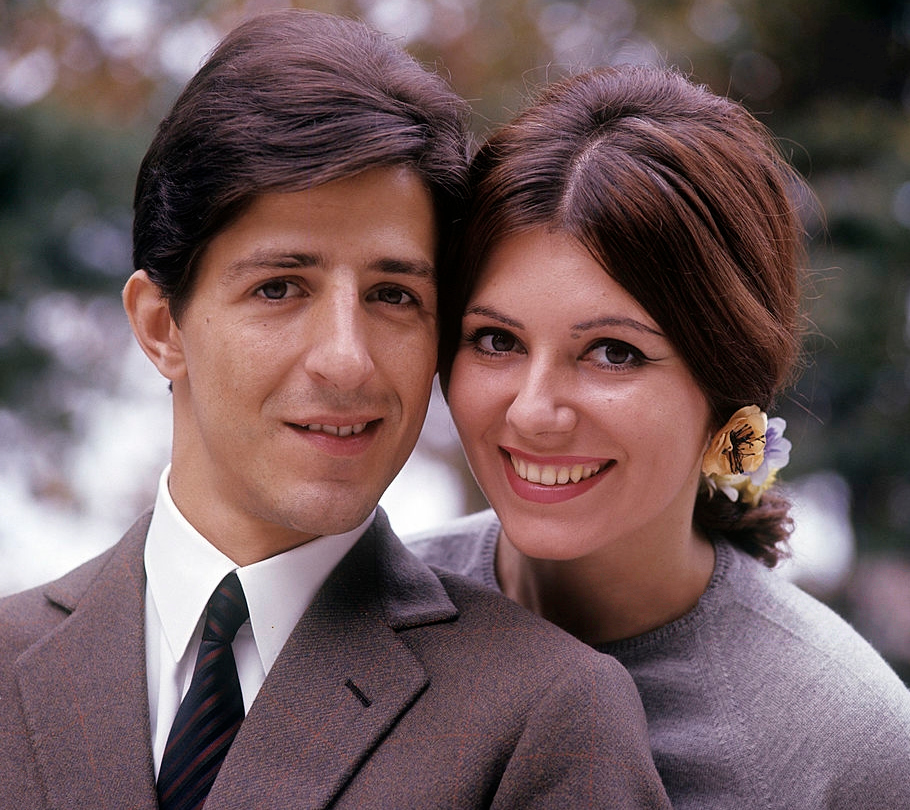
Gaber and Ombretta Colli in 1964

After a sentimental-artistic companionship with singer and actress Maria Monti, he married Ombretta Colli in 1965, then a student of languages (Chinese and Russian) at the University of Milan. In 1966, she gave birth to daughter Dalia.

He took part in the Sanremo Music Festival four times, with the songs "Benzina e cerini" in 1961, "Così felice" in 1964, "Mai, Mai, Mai Valentina" in 1966, and "...E allora dai" in 1967.

=== Il signor G ===
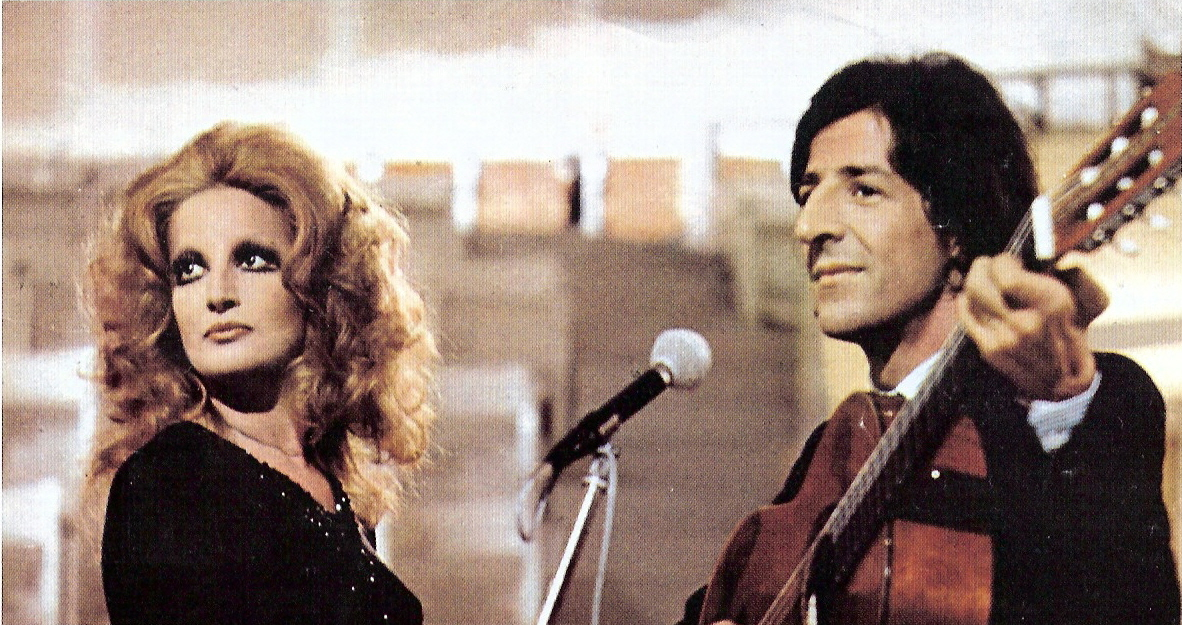
Gaber duetting with Mina in 1972

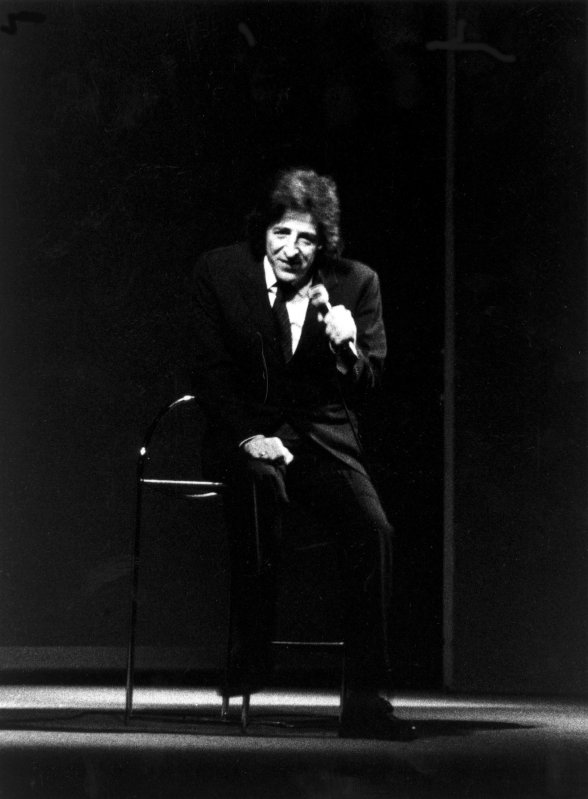
Gaber performing live in the 1990s

In 1969, he released one of his best-known successes, "Com'è bella la città", an example of the introduction of social matters in a song. The following year, he showed at Piccolo Teatro di Milano his first edition of Il signor G ('Mister G'), a recital he repeated in many Italian squares.

In 1973, he recorded the one song by which he is most recognized by international audiences: Far Finta di Essere Sani, which was covered in English as Tomorrow's Got to be Sunny by Tony Orlando and Dawn on their 1975 album He Don't Love You (Like I Love You).

A year later, he was given the very first Premio Tenco award, and many years later, also received the Targa Tenco in 2001 for his song "La razza in estinzione" and in 2003 for the album Io non mi sento italiano. After the Tenco award, Gaber abandoned television and began to tour only in theatres, as one of the founders of the teatro canzone ('song theatre') genre. He would appear again on TV, although sporadically, only in the 1990s and early 2000s.

== Death ==
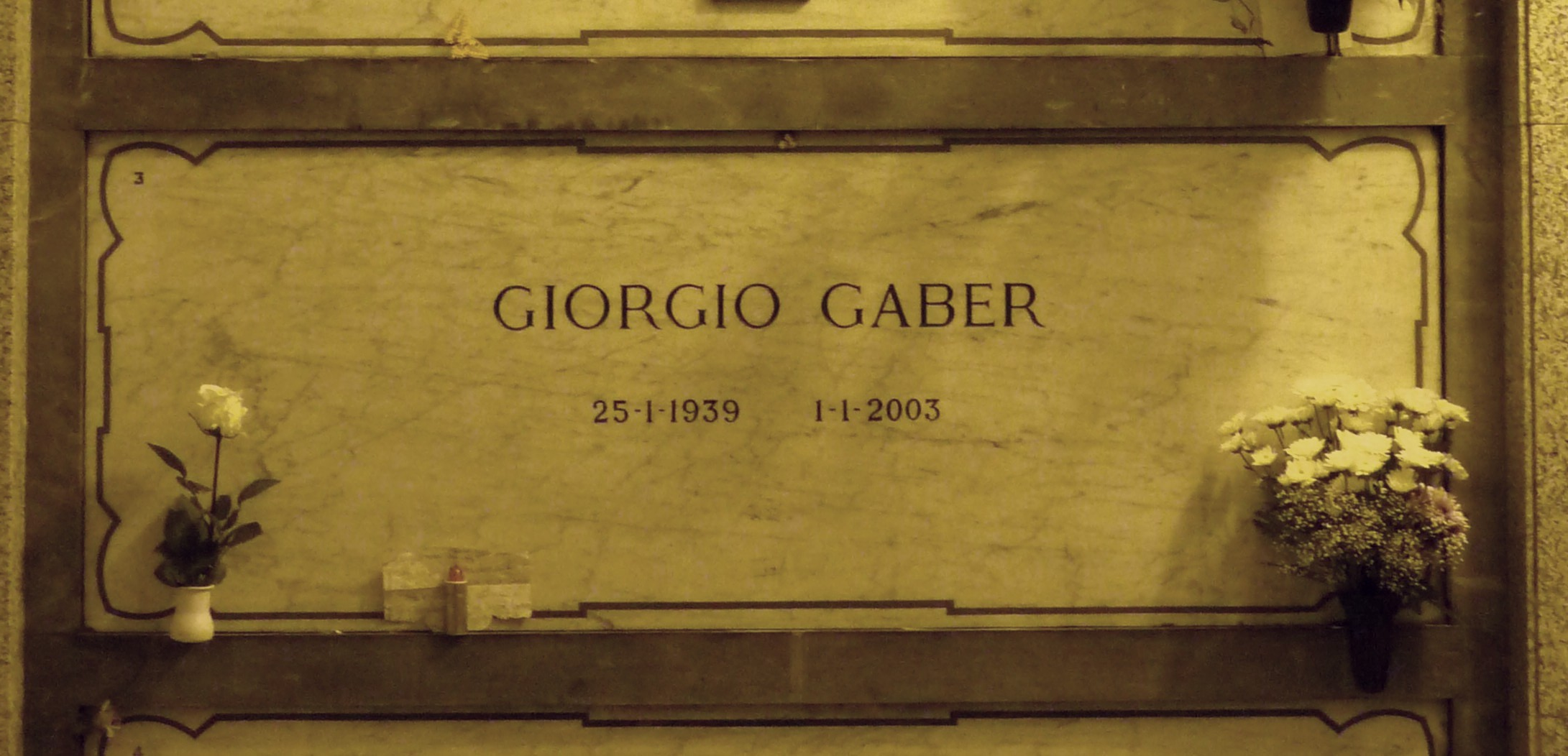
Gaber's grave at the Monumental Cemetery of Milan, Italy

A lifelong smoker, Giorgio Gaber died on New Year's Day 2003 after suffering from lung cancer, in his country house in Montemagno, near Camaiore, Tuscany, and his body was buried at the Monumental Cemetery of Milan.

In 2004, the refurbished underground auditorium of the Pirelli Tower in Milan was dedicated to him.

In 2012, Patti Smith recorded the cover of Io come persona, translated into English "I as a person", contained in the anthological album ...io ci sono.

On 25 January 2022, Gaber was honoured with a Google Doodle in celebration of his 83rd birthday.

== Discography ==
- Il signor G (1970)
- I borghesi (1971)
- Dialogo tra un impegnato e un non so (1972)
- Far finta di essere sani (1973, studio)
- Far finta di essere sani (theatre recording, 1973–74)
- Anche per oggi non si vola (1974)
- Libertà obbligatoria (1976)
- Polli di allevamento (1978)
- Pressione bassa (1980)
- Io se fossi Dio (1980)
- Anni affollati (1981)
- Il teatro di Giorgio Gaber (1982)
- Gaber (1984)
- Io se fossi Gaber (1985)
- Piccoli spostamenti del cuore (1987)
- Parlami d'amore Mariù (1987)
- Il Grigio (1989)
- Storie del signor G (1991, VHS)
- Il teatro canzone (1992)
- Ma per fortuna che c'è... Giorgio Gaber (1994)
- Io come persona (1994)
- E pensare che c'era il pensiero (1994)
- E pensare che c'era il pensiero (1995)
- Gaber 96/97 (1996)
- Un'idiozia conquistata a fatica (1997)
- Un'idiozia conquistata a fatica (1998, 2nd version)
- Gaber 1999/2000 (1999)
- La mia generazione ha perso (2001)
- Io non mi sento italiano (2003)

There is also a large discography of LPs and 45s related to his production of pop music songs and ballads. Ja-Ga brothers (1983) with Enzo Jannacci, is the reprinting of the 1960 recordings of the two singers.

== See also ==
- Sanremo Music Festival
