= Montemagno =

Montemagno may refer to:

- Montemagno, Piedmont, a comune (municipality) in the Province of Asti, Piedmont, Italy
- Montemagno, Pisa, a village in the comune of Calci in the Province of Pisa, Tuscany, Italy
- Montemagno, Pistoia, a village in the comune of Quarrata in the Province of Pistoia, Tuscany, Italy
- Montemagno, Lucca, in the Province of Lucca, Tuscany, Italy

== See also ==
- Buonaccorso da Montemagno – name of two scholars from Pistoia, Tuscany
