= La Corte-San Piero =

- Frazione
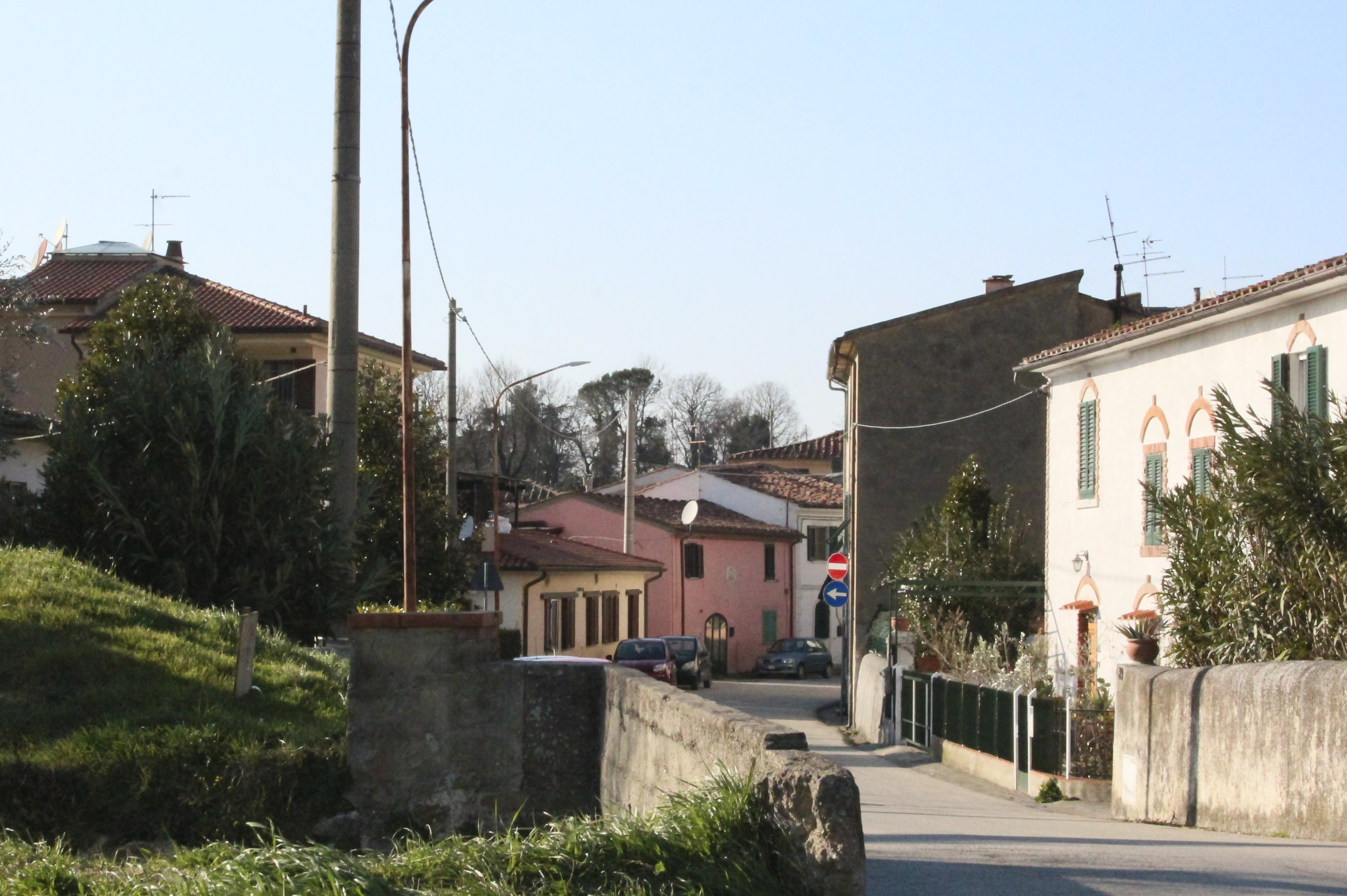

- Location of La Corte-San Piero in Italy
- Coordinates: 43°43′01″N 10°30′43″E
- Country: Italy
- Region: Tuscany
- Province: Pisa (PI)
- Comune: Calci
- Elevation: 20 m (66 ft)
- Time zone: UTC+1 (CET)
  - Summer (DST): UTC+2 (CEST)
- Postal code: 56011
- Dialing code: (+39) 050

La Corte-San Piero is a village in Tuscany, central Italy, administratively a frazione of the comune of Calci, province of Pisa.

The village is composed by the two hamlets of La Corte and San Piero. It is about 10 km from Pisa and 1 km from the municipal seat of La Pieve.

== Bibliography ==
- Caciagli, Giuseppe (1972). Pisa e la sua provincia. Vol. 2. Pisa: Colombo Cursi Editore.
