= Santi Giovanni ed Ermolao, Calci =

Church building in La Pieve, Italy

Coordinates: 43°43′34″N 10°30′47″E

Saints John and Ermolao, or Pieve di Santi Giovanni ed Ermolao is a Romanesque-style, Roman Catholic parish church, located in La Pieve, Calci, some 10 km outside Pisa, region of Tuscany, Italy.

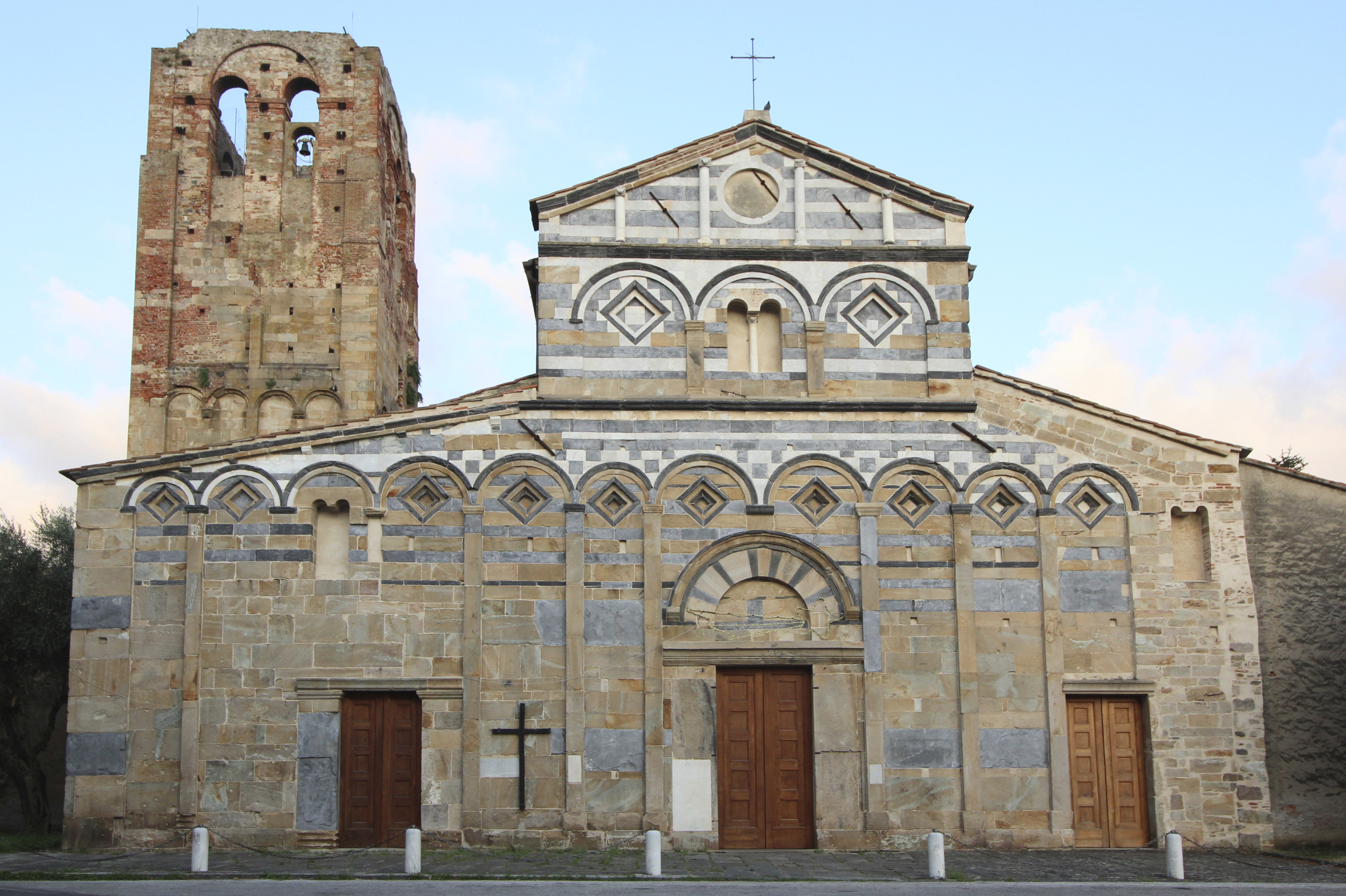
Facade and Bell-tower of Pieve

== History ==
A church at the site was present in the 11th-century, but expanded after the relics of the martyred saint Ermolao was transferred into this church in 1111. It was restored and expanded in 1617 using designs by Cosimo Pugliani. Within that time, the apse was also expanded and the transept was completed. Throughout the centuries since, the structure has undergone other changes including: an expansion of the left side of the façade, the opening of an entry on the right side, and the construction of the side altars and the arch over the font.

The font was sculpted with classical images by followers of Biduino. It includes the depiction of the river Jordan in human form, and the inclusion of angel statues.

Similar classical forms characterize the interior of the basilica, which is divided into three naves by columns surmounted by neo-corinthian capitals. The facade is divided into a double row of blind arches. Among the works are: two paintings by Aurelio Lomi, a Madonna and Child by Cecco di Pietro, and what remains of a 12th-century painted wooden cross.

== The Bell tower ==
The imposing square tower is located next to the left transept of the church. A short distance from the walls of the church, on the south side, is a majestic gateway arch.

Some local historians speculate that the mighty quadrangular base of the tower is the ruin of an ancient defensive tower whose large foundations were hidden below the current street level. The presence of two windows on the north and east sides that are tall and narrow with wide internal splay, features typically loopholes included for archers, are partial evidence for the tower's defensive role, along with the structure's 9 meter width.

Other authors in the past, however, have disregarded this as evidence, maintaining it is instead the result of folk legend.

== Bibliography ==
- Giovanni Benvenuti, La Rocca della Verruca e il sistema difensivo del Monte Pisano. Agnano Pisano, Stamperia Editoriale Pisana, 2004.
