= Crespignano =

- Frazione
- Location of Crespignano in Italy
- Coordinates: 43°42′30″N 10°30′44″E
- Country: Italy
- Region: Tuscany
- Province: Pisa (PI)
- Comune: Calci
- Elevation: 20 m (66 ft)
- Time zone: UTC+1 (CET)
  - Summer (DST): UTC+2 (CEST)
- Postal code: 56011
- Dialing code: (+39) 050

Crespignano is a village in Tuscany, central Italy, administratively a frazione of the comune of Calci, province of Pisa.

It is about 12 km (7.5 mi) from Pisa and 3 km (1.9 mi) from the municipal seat of La Pieve.

== Bibliography ==
- Caciagli, Giuseppe (1972). Pisa e la sua provincia. Vol. 2. Pisa: Colombo Cursi Editore.
