= Rezzano-Nicosia =

- Frazione
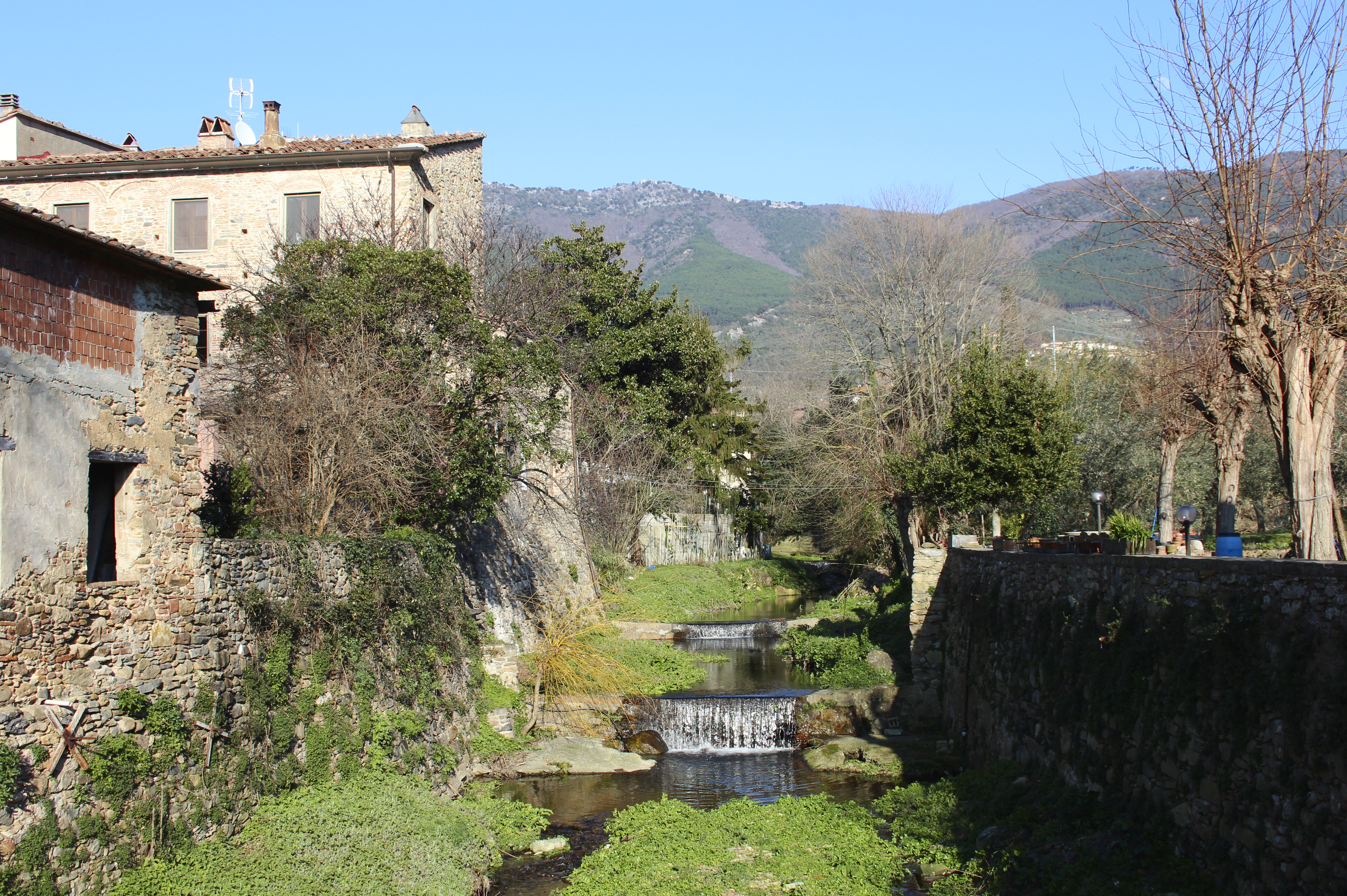

- Location of Rezzano-Nicosia in Italy
- Coordinates: 43°43′5″N 10°31′17″E
- Country: Italy
- Region: Tuscany
- Province: Pisa (PI)
- Comune: Calci
- Elevation: 50 m (160 ft)

Population
  - Total: 1,102
- Time zone: UTC+1 (CET)
  - Summer (DST): UTC+2 (CEST)
- Postal code: 56011
- Dialing code: (+39) 050

Rezzano-Nicosia is a village in Tuscany, central Italy, administratively a frazione of the comune of Calci, province of Pisa.

The village is composed by the two hamlets of Nicosia and Rezzano. It is approximately 12 km from Pisa and 1 km from the municipal seat of La Pieve.

== Bibliography ==
- Caciagli, Giuseppe (1972). Pisa e la sua provincia. Vol. 2. Pisa: Colombo Cursi Editore.
