= Biduino =

Italian sculptor

Biduino or Biduinus (active c. 1173 – 1194) was an Italian sculptor and architect from the Romanesque period, active around Pisa and Lucca. His name is attributed to having been born in Bidogno in Val, near Lugano.

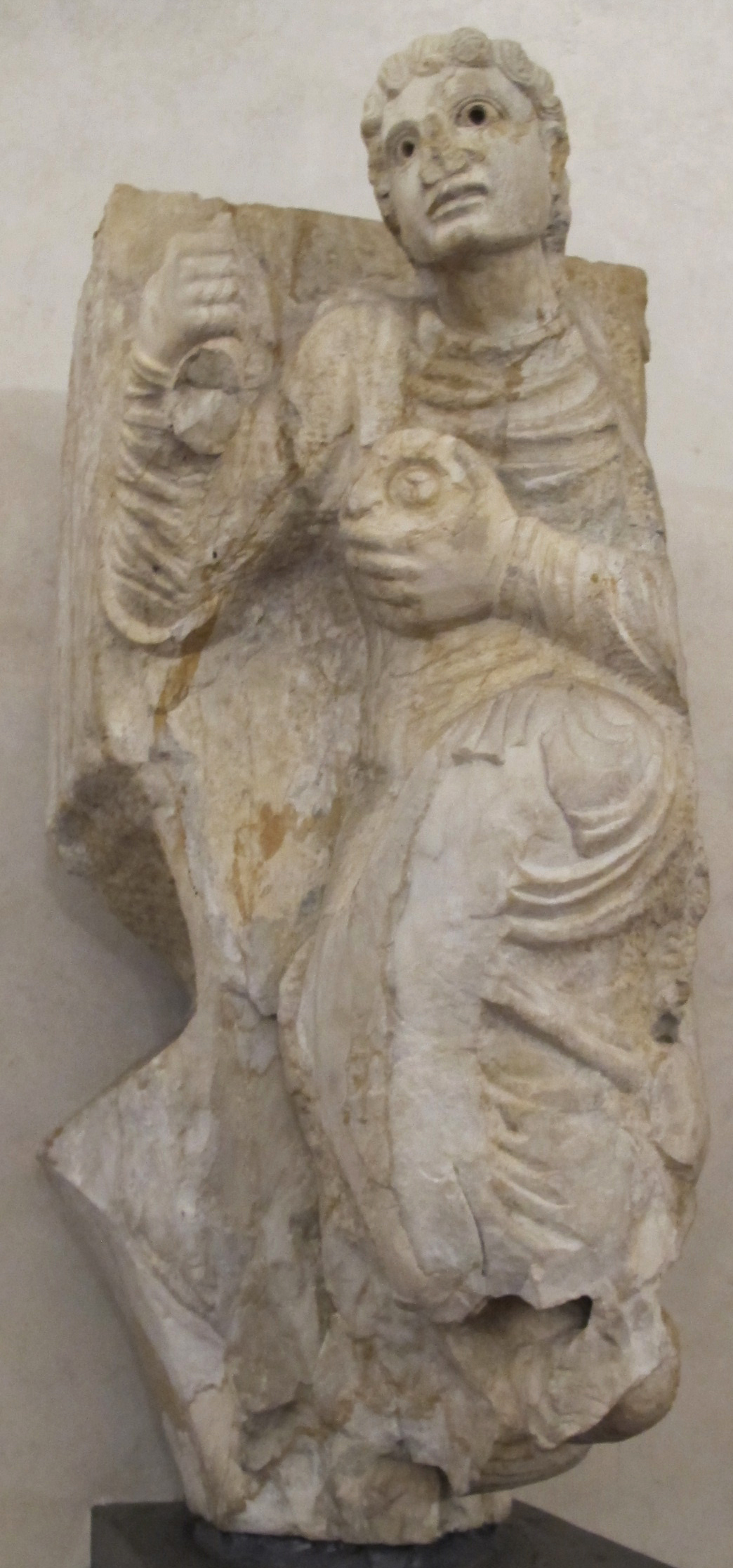
Biduino, was an Italian sculptor and architect

== Works ==
Works attributed to this artist are found in:

- Santi Ippolito e Cassiano, San Casciano, near Pisa
- San Paolo all'Orto
- Parish Church of Saint John and Saint Ermolao, Calci
- Sant'Alessandro, Lucca
- San Salvatore, Lucca
- sarcofago giudice Giratto Camposanto, galleria sud, Pisa
