= San Paolo all'Orto =

Church building in Pisa, Italy

Coordinates: 43°43′3.07″N 10°24′15.20″E

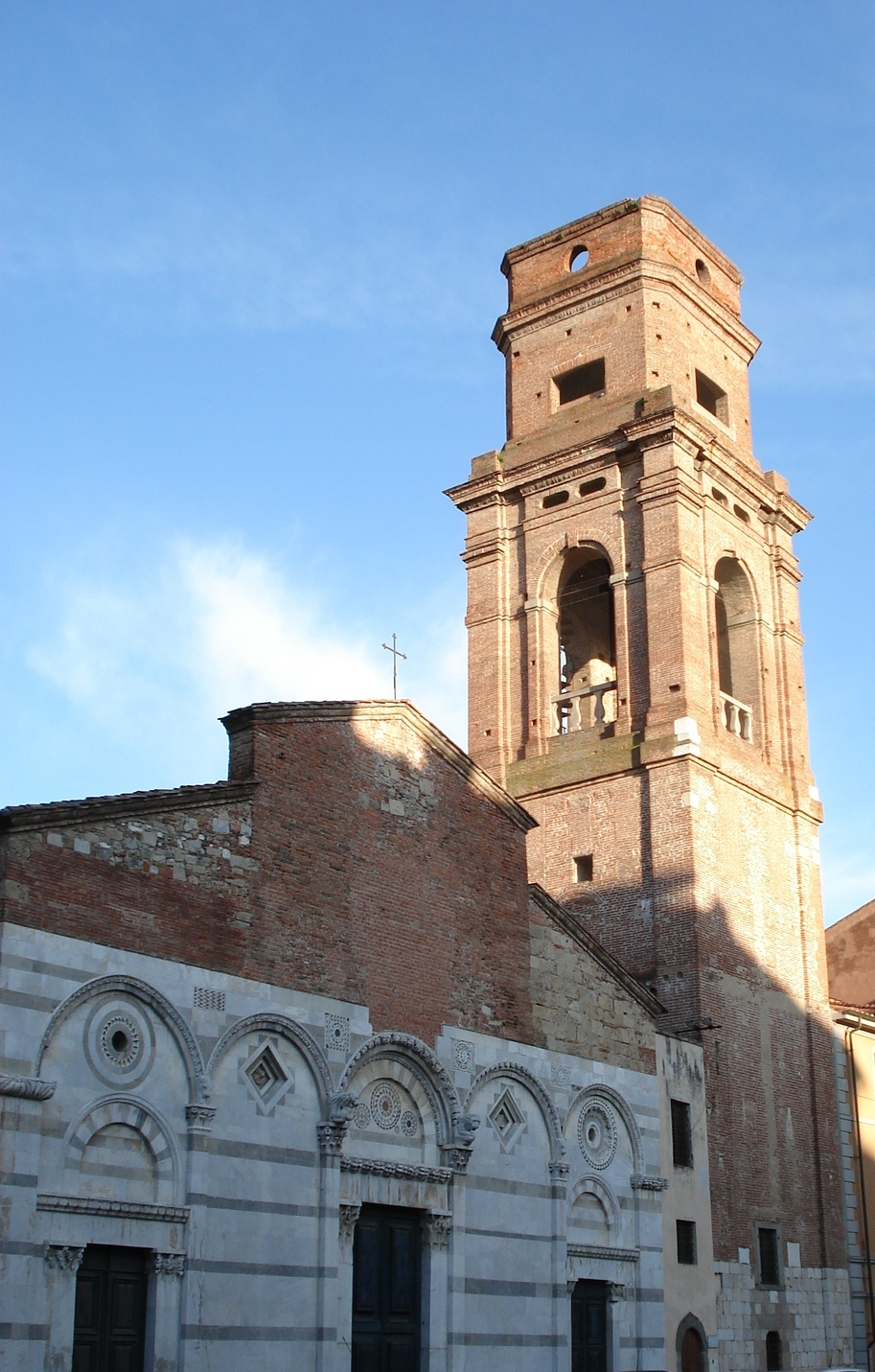
San Paolo all'Orto.

San Paolo all'Orto is a Romanesque-style, former Roman Catholic church in Pisa, region of Tuscany, Italy.

== History ==
Documented from 1086, it was a priory from the 12th to the 15th centuries, held by Augustinian nuns. The church is now unconsecrated and used for cultural events.

The façade has the typical Pisane stripes of bichrome marble stones, and is articulated in five arcades with lozenges, intarsias and capitals sculpted by Biduino (late 12th century). The bell tower, which was rebuilt several times, dates to the 17th century.

The interior has a nave and two aisles, and had once an apse destroyed in the 15th century. It houses remains of frescoes and sinopias from the 12th-13th centuries; the fresco and stucco decoration is from the 18th century.
