= Castelmaggiore, Calci =

Castelmaggiore
- Frazione
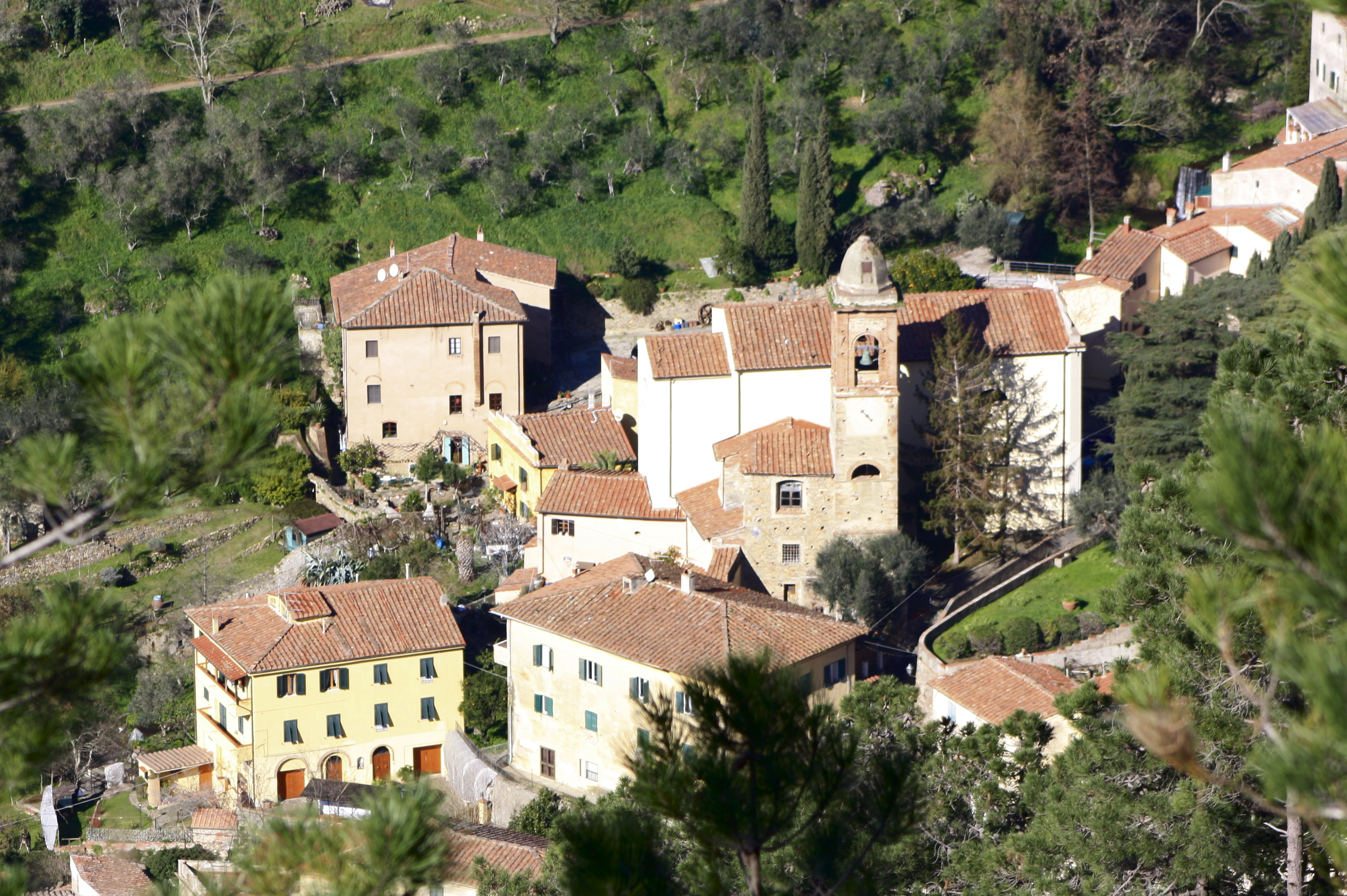

- Location of Castelmaggiore in Italy
- Coordinates: 43°44′22″N 10°31′23″E
- Country: Italy
- Region: Tuscany
- Province: Pisa (PI)
- Comune: Calci
- Elevation: 120 m (390 ft)

Population
  - Total: 580
- Demonym: Castelmaggioresi
- Time zone: UTC+1 (CET)
  - Summer (DST): UTC+2 (CEST)
- Postal code: 56011
- Dialing code: (+39) 050

Castelmaggiore is a village in Tuscany, central Italy, administratively a frazione of the comune of Calci, province of Pisa.

Castelmaggiore is about 13 km from Pisa and 2 km from Calci.

== Bibliography ==
- Caciagli, Giuseppe (1972). Pisa e la sua provincia. Vol. 2. Pisa: Colombo Cursi Editore.
