= Tre Colli =

- Frazione
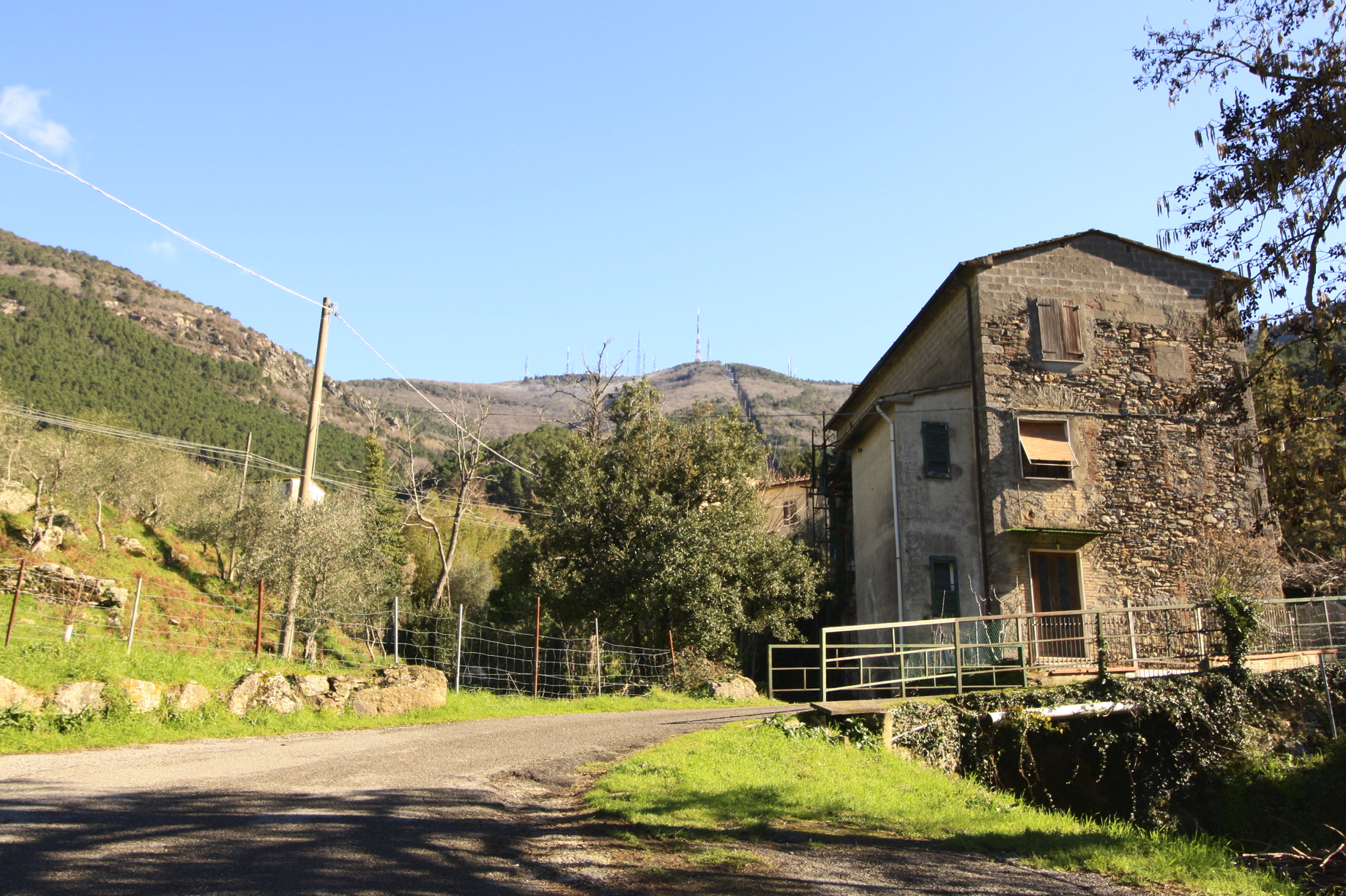

- Location of Tre Colli in Italy
- Coordinates: 43°44′39″N 10°31′53″E
- Country: Italy
- Region: Tuscany
- Province: Pisa (PI)
- Comune: Calci
- Elevation: 225 m (738 ft)

Population
  - Total: 51
- Time zone: UTC+1 (CET)
  - Summer (DST): UTC+2 (CEST)
- Postal code: 56011
- Dialing code: (+39) 050

Tre Colli is a village in Tuscany, central Italy, administratively a frazione of the comune of Calci, province of Pisa.

Tre Colli is about 14 km from Pisa and 3 km from Calci.

== Bibliography ==
- Caciagli, Giuseppe (1972). Pisa e la sua provincia. Vol. 2. Pisa: Colombo Cursi Editore.
