= San Salvatore, Lucca =

Roman Catholic church in Lucca, Italy

Coordinates: 43°50′38.8″N 10°30′10.0″E

San Salvatore in Mustolio
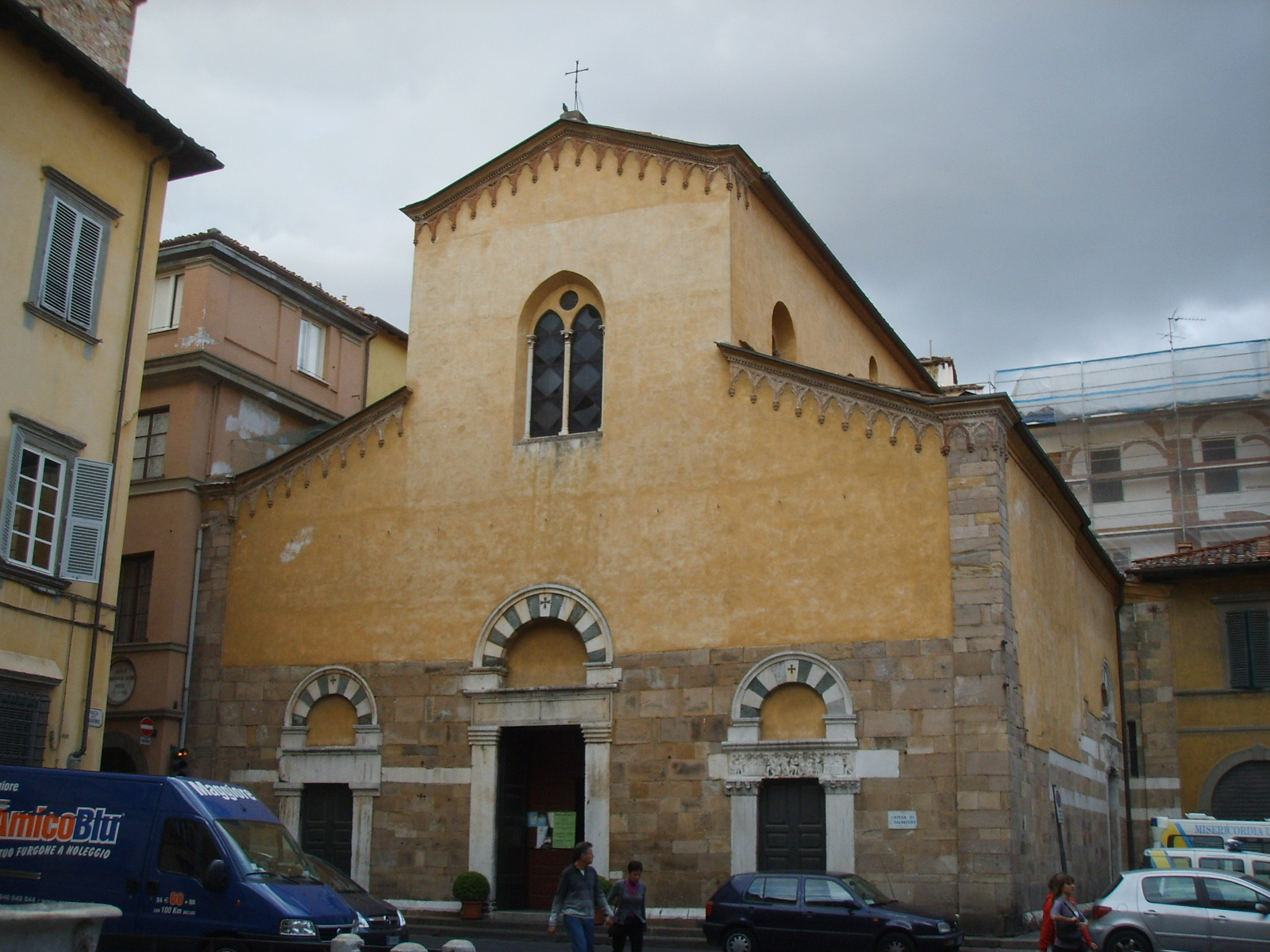
- Facade
- San Salvatore in Mustolio
- Location: Tuscany, Italy
- Country: Italy
- Denomination: Roman Catholic

Architecture
- Architectural type: Romanesque-style

San Salvatore in Mustolio is a Romanesque- style, Roman Catholic church located on Piazza of the same name in central Lucca, region of Tuscany, Italy.

== History ==
A church at the site was documented since the first decades of the 11th-century, but the present layout derives from a 12th-century reconstruction. The lower 2 meters of the church used stones from the medieval walls of the town. The upper portion of the church was refurbished in the 19th century.

The church was affiliated with the Canons of San Frediano in the 18th-century. The church was suppressed under Napoleonic occupation. In 1820, it was property of the Confraternity della Carità.

The exterior facade has some 12th-century reliefs in the architraves: one depicting a Eucharistic meal; the second, a miracle of San Nicolao Prete signed by Biduino. Inside the church in 1820 was a main altarpiece depicting the Ascension of Christ by Paolo Zacchia il Vecchio. A canvas of the Assumption of Mary by Bonuccio Trénta, had been moved here from the former church of San Pietro Maggiore. There was also a St Jerome by Alessandro Ardente of Faenza, and a Saints Zita and Paolino by Gaspare Mannucci.
