= Calci =

- Comune
- Comune di Calci
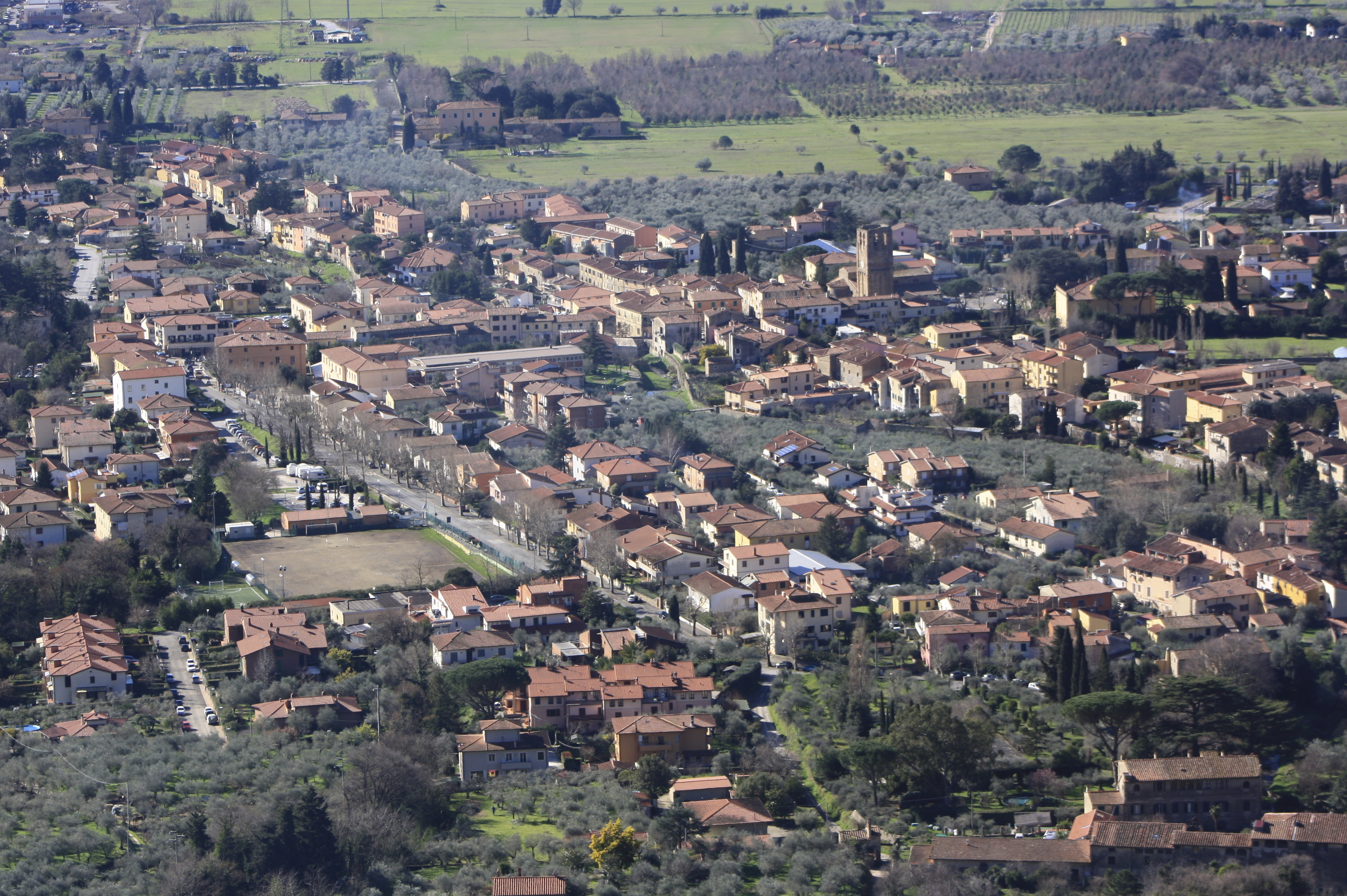
- View of Calci

- Coat of arms

- Location within Italy Location within Tuscany
- Coordinates: 43°43′N 10°31′E
- Country: Italy
- Region: Tuscany
- Province: Pisa (PI)
- Frazioni: Castelmaggiore, Crespignano, Gabella, Il Colle-Villa, La Corte-San Piero, La Pieve (municipal seat), Pontegrande-Sant'Andrea, Montemagno, Rezzano-Nicosia, Tre Colli

Government
  - Mayor: Valentina Ricotta

Area
  - Total: 25.17 km^{2} (9.72 sq mi)
- Elevation: 50 m (160 ft)

Population (30 April 2017)
  - Total: 6,367
  - Density: 253.0/km^{2} (655.2/sq mi)
- Demonym: Calcesani
- Time zone: UTC+1 (CET)
  - Summer (DST): UTC+2 (CEST)
- Postal code: 56011
- Dialing code: 050
- Patron saint: St. Ermolaus
- Saint day: August 7
- Website: Official website

Calci is a comune (municipality) in the Province of Pisa in the Italian region Tuscany, located about 60 kilometres (37 mi) west of Florence and about 9 kilometres (6 mi) east of Pisa.

== Government ==
Frazioni

The main settlement is the municipal seat of La Pieve; the rest of the population is distributed between the other hamlets – frazioni – of Castelmaggiore, Crespignano, Gabella, Il Colle-Villa, La Corte-San Piero, Pontegrande-Sant'Andrea, Montemagno, Rezzano-Nicosia and Tre Colli.

== Main sights ==
Its main attraction is Pisa Charterhouse, also known as Calci Charterhouse (Certosa di Pisa or di Calci), which houses a natural history museum of the University of Pisa.
