= Gaspare Mannucci =

Italian painter

- Born: 1575; Florence, Italy
- Died: 1642 (aged 66–67); Florence, Italy
- Known for: painter
- Movement: Baroque

Gaspare Mannucci (1575–1642) was an Italian painter during the Baroque period in Lucca.

== Biography ==
He painted (1638) a Crucifixion and Mary Madalen for the church of San Piercigoli in Lucca. He painted a Madonna with Saints Lawrence and Gervasius (1629) for the church of Santa Maria Forisportam. He is likely related to Pietro Mannucci who painted for the Pieve a San Paolo in 1632. He also painted an altarpiece for the church of San Salvatore in Lucca .
