= Gabella, Calci =

Gabella
- Frazione
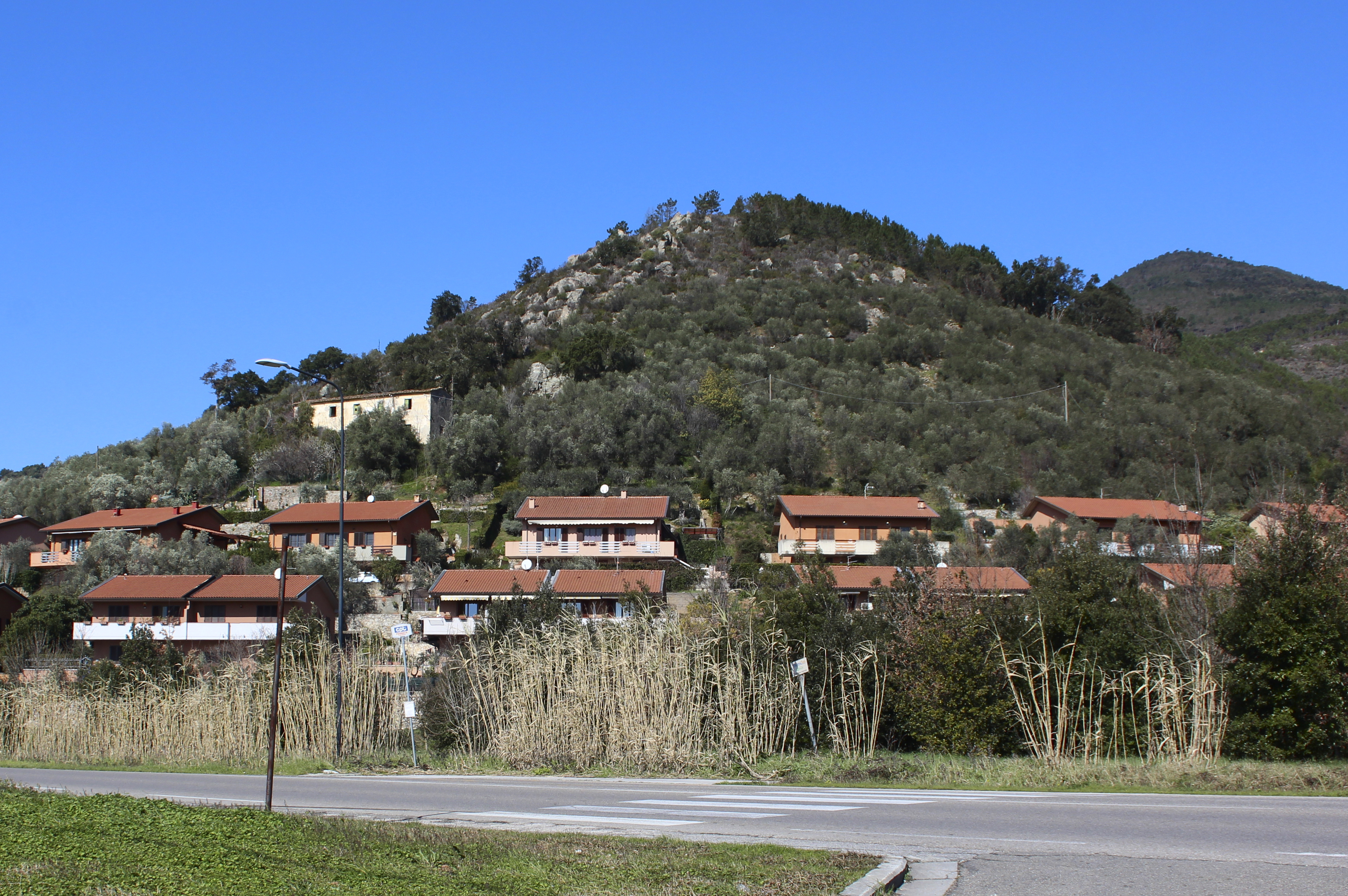

- Location of Gabella in Italy
- Coordinates: 43°43′25″N 10°29′44″E
- Country: Italy
- Region: Tuscany
- Province: Pisa (PI)
- Comune: Calci
- Elevation: 9 m (30 ft)

Population (2011)
  - Total: 1,223
- Time zone: UTC+1 (CET)
  - Summer (DST): UTC+2 (CEST)
- Postal code: 56011
- Dialing code: (+39) 050

Gabella is a village in Tuscany, central Italy, administratively a frazione of the comune of Calci, province of Pisa.

Gabella is about 9 km from Pisa and 2 km from Calci.

== Bibliography ==
- Caciagli, Giuseppe (1972). Pisa e la sua provincia. Vol. 3. Pisa: Colombo Cursi Editore.
