= Paolo Mannucci =

Italian cyclist

Personal information
- Full name: Paolo Mannucci
- Born: 9 February 1942 (age 84) Capraia e Limite

Cycling career
- Sport: Cycling
- Role: Rider

Paolo Mannucci (born 9 February 1942) is an Italian former racing cyclist. He finished in last place in the 1966 Tour de France.
