= Montemagno, Pisa =

Montemagno
- Frazione
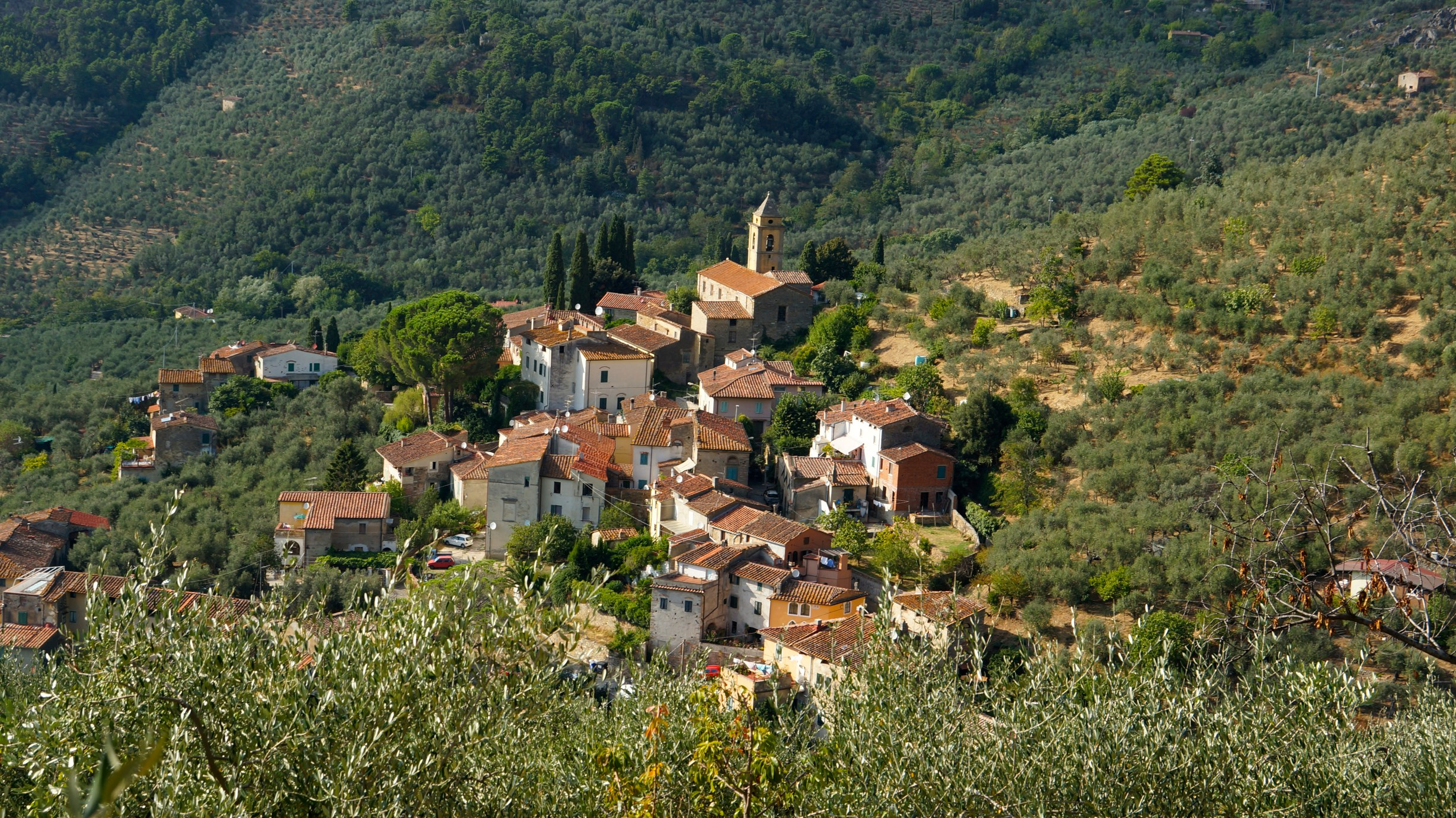

- Location of Montemagno in Italy
- Coordinates: 43°43′12″N 10°32′16″E
- Country: Italy
- Region: Tuscany
- Province: Pisa (PI)
- Comune: Calci
- Elevation: 114 m (374 ft)

Population (2011)
  - Total: 344
- Demonym: Montemagnesi
- Time zone: UTC+1 (CET)
  - Summer (DST): UTC+2 (CEST)
- Postal code: 56011
- Dialing code: (+39) 050

The village of Montemagno is situated in the comune of Calci, Province of Pisa, Tuscany, Italy, some 15 km East of Pisa, 2 km East of Calci. The name Montemagno is vulgar for Mons Ianus, Latin for Monte Giano, dedicated to the Roman god Janus (from whom we have the word January).

The village is first mentioned in a charter of the Abbey of San Savino in the year 780. The village is surrounded by olive groves.

There are three churches in Montemagno. The oldest one is S. Martino, not any longer within the village proper (see below). In 1021 walls were erected around the village, but S. Martino was a few hundred meters away and left out. Within the walls a new church was erected in 1076 (the belltower was founded in 1786 and finished in 1811). The new church is named Santa Maria della Neve. The village continued to develop around the new church, and the old one was abandoned. The third church is a chapel and is named Chiesino di S. Rocco. It was erected in 1632 by the 90 grateful surviving inhabitants after the plague in 1630 took 272 lives in the village.

In 1880, the comune of Montemagno was integrated into the comune of Calci. About 200 people live in the village today.

On 15 February 1145 Pietro Bernardo Paganelli from Montemagno was elected the 167th Pope. He took the name Pope Eugene III.
