= La Pieve, Calci =

La Pieve
- Frazione
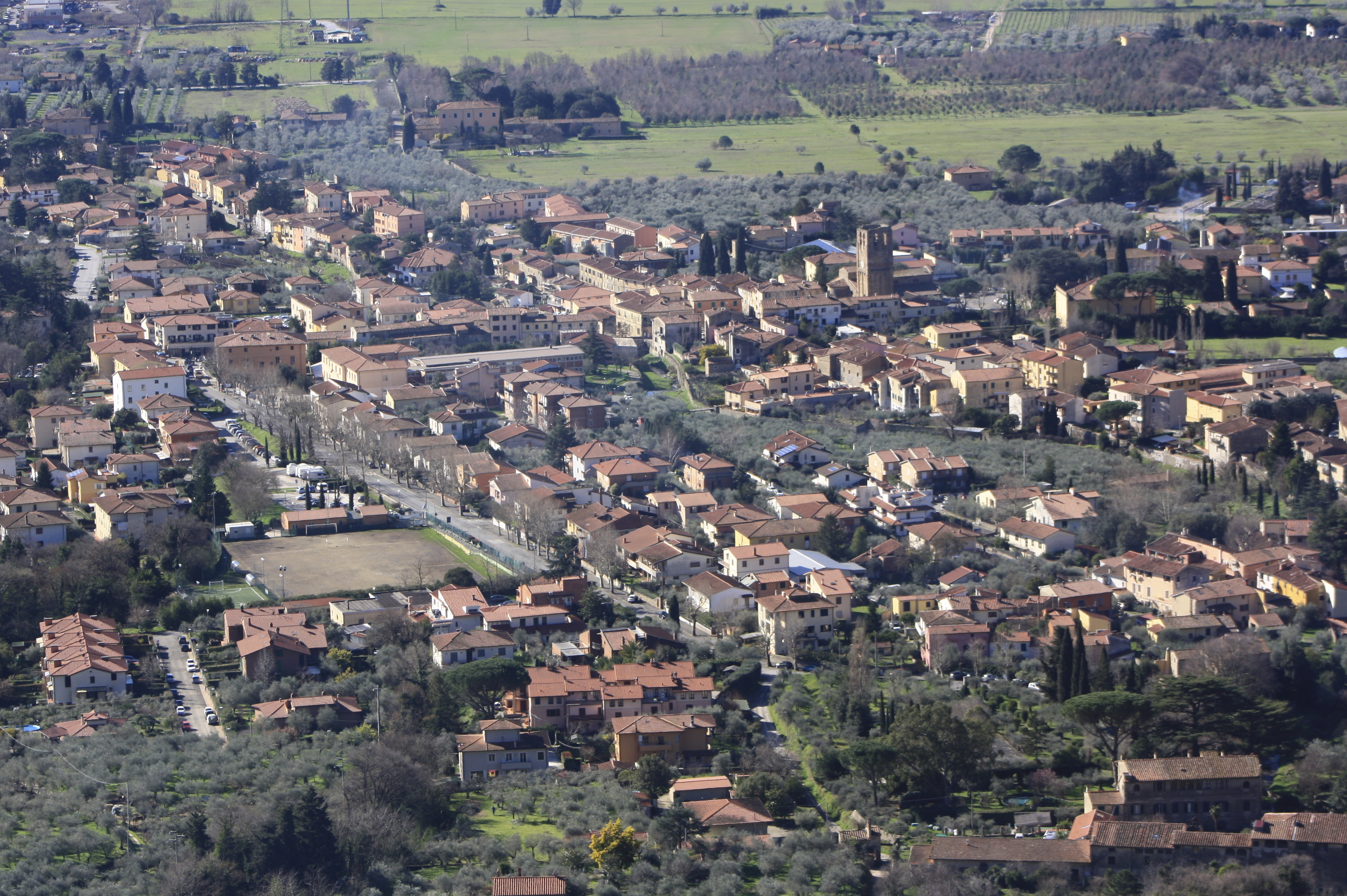
- View of La Pieve

- Location of La Pieve in Italy
- Coordinates: 43°43′34″N 10°30′48″E
- Country: Italy
- Region: Tuscany
- Province: Pisa (PI)
- Comune: Calci
- Elevation: 120 m (390 ft)

Population
  - Total: 3,500
- Time zone: UTC+1 (CET)
  - Summer (DST): UTC+2 (CEST)
- Postal code: 56011
- Dialing code: (+39) 050

La Pieve is a village in Tuscany, central Italy, administratively a frazione of the comune of Calci, province of Pisa.

La Pieve is the municipal seat of the municipality of Calci. It is about 13 km from Pisa.

== Main sights ==
- Pieve dei Santi Giovanni ed Ermolao

== Bibliography ==
- Caciagli, Giuseppe (1972). Pisa e la sua provincia. Vol. 2. Pisa: Colombo Cursi Editore.
