= Antonio Mazzarosa =

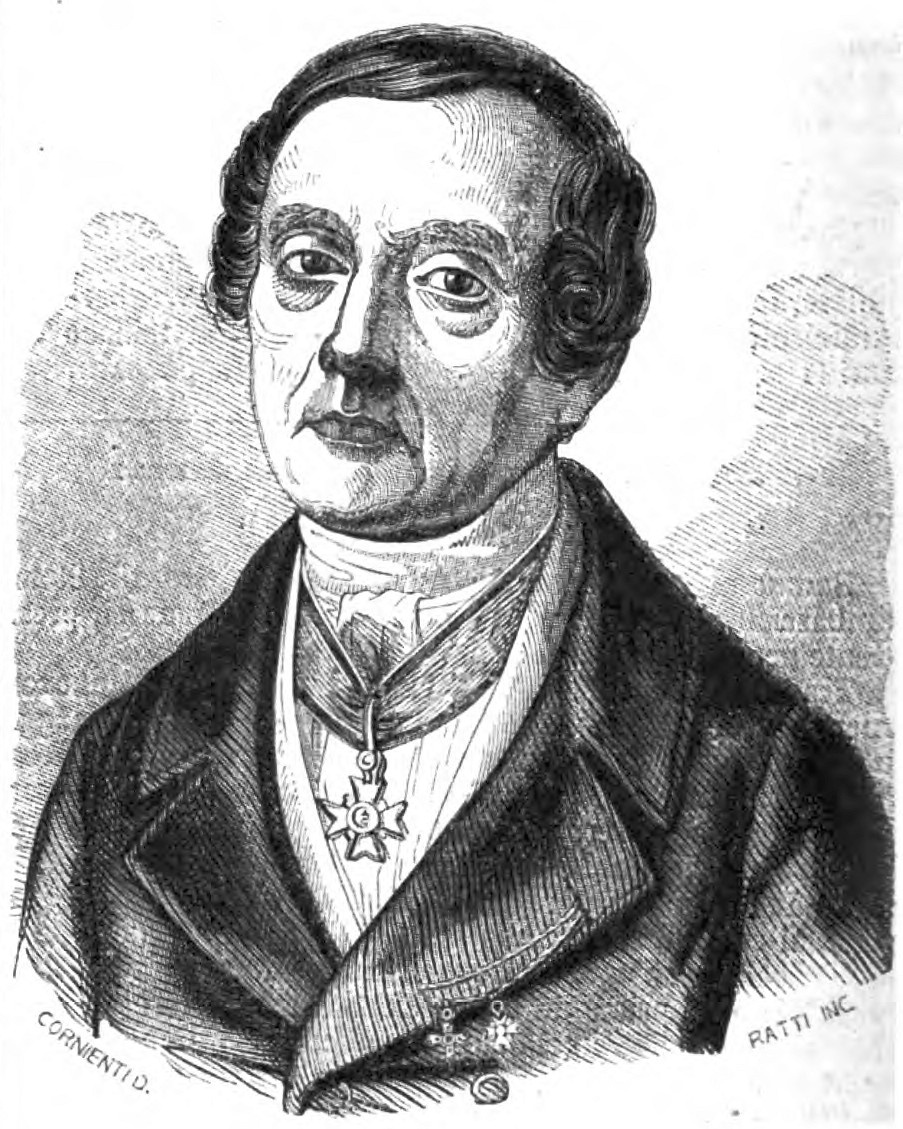
- Born: Antonio Mansi; 29 September 1780; Lucca
- Died: 27 March 1861 (aged 80); Lucca
- Occupations: intellectual, politician

Antonio Mazzarosa (Lucca, 29 September 1780 – Lucca, 27 March 1861) was an Italian politician and intellectual.

== Early life ==
Antonio Mazzarosa was born in Lucca on 29 September 1780. His birth family name was Mansi and he was the sixth son of Giovan Battista Mansi, a Lucchese patrician, and Caterina Massoni. He took the name Mazzarosa at the age of 20, when he was adopted by the marchese Francesco Mazzarosa, who had no sons and wished to avoid the extinction of his line. The adoption made Antonio the heir of a noteworthy patrimony and permitted him a promising political career.

== Career ==
In 1799 the Republic of Lucca was occupied by the French and transformed into a Jacobin democracy. The young Mazzarosa was an attentive observer of the events of those years and admired the strict, but moderate regime that was installed with the creation of the Principality of Lucca and Piombino. At the time of the collapse of the Napoleonic power in Italy, Mazzarosa was chosen by the reconstituted Senate of the Republic to become part of the Provisory Government of the Lucchese States (May 1814). In fact though power was exercised by the commanders of the Austrian troops who almost immediately fell under the control of the British who had originally occupied the Principate.

In 1817 the Duchy of Lucca fell under the Austrian military administration under Maria Luisa di Borbone. Mazzarosa's political asencdency however was assured beginning in 1824 when the duchess died and her son Carlo Lodovico ascended the throne. It was in that year that Mazzarosa became President of the Commission for the Encouragement of the Arts and Manufacturing, a state department authorized to promote political solutions to encourage manufacturing. Mazzarosa's brother, Ascanio Mansi, served at the highest levels of the duchy's government for decades, occupying the position of secretary of state and often even that of minister of the interior and exterior, respectively.

In 1825 Mazzarosa got himself appointed to a key post in the educational system of the Duchy, becoming the Director General of Public Education, which charge included the role of the director of the University of Lucca. His position finally peaked in 1830 when the sovereign took from the Minister of the Interior the authority over the educational institutions of every level, creating a separate director equivalent to minister. Mazzarosa was placed at the head of this new structure, combining the charges of Director of the University and Minister of Public Education. Under his directions, the University was greatly improved and had notable professors and students, among whom were Francesco Carrara and Augusto Conti. Another important achievement of Mazzarosa was to convince the Duke to introduce into the state the Asili Aportiani (1840).

Mazzarosa, who was interested in various topics including agronomy, took part in the first Congresso degli Scienziati Italiani held in Pisa in 1839 and on that occasion proposed the first general Italian agrarian survey. In practice, each of the states existing on the Italian peninsula would have been required to report on its own agricultural conditions and practices. Mazzarosa himself took on the task for the Duchy. Mazzarosa later promoted Lucca as the site of the fifth congress, which took place in September 1843.

After the death of Ascanio Mansi, Mazzarosa became president of the Consiglio di Stato (March 1840). In the eight years that followed, therefore, Mazzarosa was one of the most important political figures in the Duchy and had a fundamental role in the crisis of 1847–48. In that period in fact Lucca saw the spread of a moderate liberalism that looked for reforms and to some kind of Italian unification, ideally federal in nature.

In 1844 Mazzarosa was removed from the directorship of the university. In that moment in fact the Duke who had previously been fairly tolerant, began to assume more conservative positions and wanted to impose a less tolerant attitude towards the still weak showing of liberalism among the faculty and students. In the summer of 1847 there were repeated demonstrations in favor of Pius IX. The police initially seemed surprised, but soon the more conservative elements began to ask for more repressive measures. The duke, whose politics had always been mild and permissive, seemed to hesitate, while Mazzarosa sought to convince him to offer moderate and essentially liberal concessions. The break in the delicate equilibrium came near the end of August and beginning of September. On 30 August Mazzarosa, seeing that the duke refused to offer any reforms, resigned his position as president of the Consiglio di Stato. That night Carlo Lodovico rejected his resignation and held a large demonstration in the city the next day. The duke was in the villa of San Martino in Vignale and Mazzarosa went to the piazza and calmed the crowd promising that he would go to San Martino to obtain concessions for the freedom of the press and of the Civic Guard. Riding in a carriage, he was followed by more than 3,000 people heading towards the ducal villa. The duke, frightened by the crowd, made the requested concessions.

== Burial ==
Mazzarosa is buried in the Lucchese church of Santa Maria Forisportam in an elegant tomb sculpted by Vincenzo Consani.

== Works ==
- Le Opere del marchese A. M., edited in Lucca in 5 vol. (I-IV, 1841–42; V, 1886).

== Bibliography ==
- Augusto Mancini, MAZZAROSA, Antonio, in Enciclopedia Italiana, Roma, Istituto dell'Enciclopedia Italiana, 1934.

== Other projects ==
- Wikisource has a page dedicated to Antonio Mazzarosa
- Wikimedia Commons contains images or other files for Antonio Mazzarosa
