= Francesco Gianniti =

Italian jurist and humanist

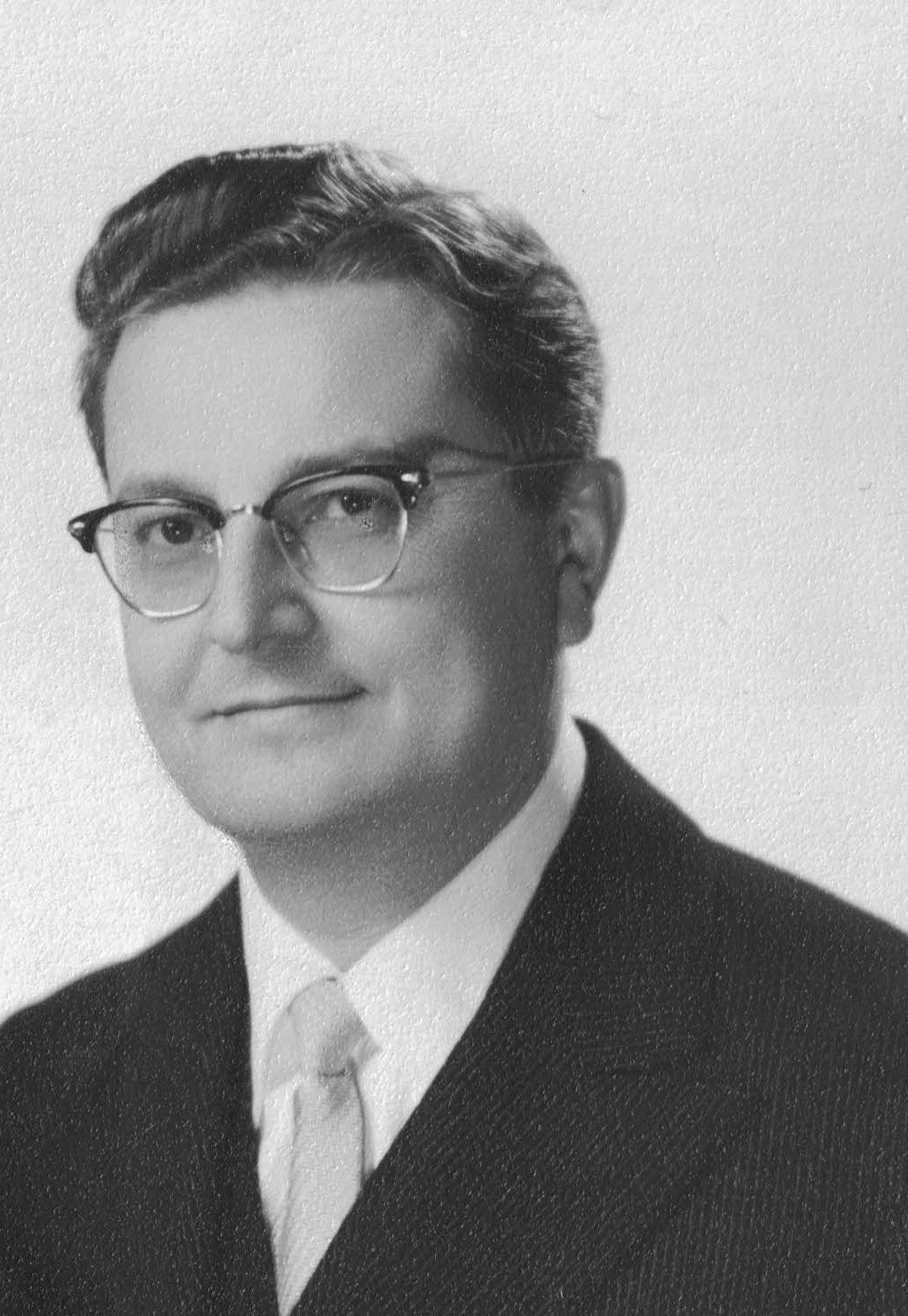
Francesco Gianniti

Francesco Gianniti (Oriolo, 4 October 1921 – Oriolo, 11 August 2017) was an Italian jurist and humanist. He was Filippo Grispigni’s student at the University of Rome and Silvio Ranieri’s disciple at the University of Bologna.

He was a professor of law and criminal procedure, a criminal lawyer and a criminal judge.

== Thought ==
The cornerstone of his criminal-criminological thought, honed over the years on the basis of the experience gained in the exercise of judicial and forensic activity, is the idea that, for the purpose of effective action to combat crime, it is necessary to process an organic criminal policy program, which contributes in addition to the penal legal disciplines (criminal law, criminal procedure and penal law), criminological experimental disciplines (in particular, psychology, sociology and criminal anthropology, forensic medicine and criminology, criminal statistics and scientific police). This program should move along the following lines:

- prevalence of the principle of prevention with respect to that of repression;
- study of the crime no longer only as a legal entity, but as a human and social reality, moving from crime in the abstract to its author in concrete;
- diagnosis of the personality and prognosis of the dangerousness of the subject who commits criminal activities, in this investigating what there is of "freedom", but also of "necessity" or "conditioning";
- flanking of the inductive-experimental method to the deductive-rational method in the study of the individual and social phenomena of crime;
- affirmation of the rights of the accused before the arbitrators of the public authorities, accompanied by measures to protect the community and the person offended by the crime;
- search for the multiplicity of factors of crime (as an individual phenomenon) and crime (as a social phenomenon);
- determination of a plurality of remedies to counteract the endogenous and exogenous factors of the crime and the political and social factors of crime;
- individualization of the sanction and of the treatment, in the sense that the sanction, in the phase of the penal trial, and the treatment, in that of the penal execution, must be adapted to the particular personality of each subject;
- a tendency towards a broad decriminalization of minor offenses and provision of substitute sanctions and alternative measures to detention;
- rehabilitative penitentiary treatment for the social reintegration of the condemned.

The criminal-criminological thought of Francesco Gianniti is characterized by the tension to satisfy, with the aid of the bio-sociological disciplines of crime, the practical needs of the penalistic disciplines and the preference given to the interdisciplinary and comparative method in the study of criminal law, substantive and procedural.

In this regard, he argued that:

"the science of criminal prosecution - similar to criminal science (but unlike the science of the civil trial) - does not end in juridical investigation (criminal procedural law), but extends to psychological investigation (psychology criminal and criminal judicial psychology) and is completed in the sociological survey (criminal process sociology and criminal judicial sociology). The three surveys - while remaining autonomous for diversity of object, nature and method - are mutually complementary: law, psychology and sociology in fact, they give rise to inquiries that are necessarily different but inextricably linked in an interdisciplinary study of the criminal trial".

From here rises the particular conception Francesco Gianniti had of the criminal lawyer, and, in particular, of the criminal judge. Precisely it was his conviction that:

"the jurist (and especially the criminal lawyer, understood in a broad sense) can not limit himself to dogmatics, that is to the exclusive study of the content and scope of the juridical norms in force, making a systematic elaboration; but, anchoring the conceptual elements to human and social reality, it must also investigate concrete problems, referring to a particular society, urging and helping the legislator in the arduous task of implementing the most suitable reforms. Therefore, an interdisciplinary study is necessary to guide the legislative policy in the fields - inextricably linked - of the substantive and procedural criminal law, of the judicial and penitentiary system".

As for the criminal judge, he wrote:

"these in addition to being endowed with a serene and strong balance and a strict self-control power, he must possess not only the logical finesse of the jurist and the spiritual wealth of the humanist, but also the introspective acumen of the criminologist. He, therefore, must examine and know the personality of the individual delinquent (that particular murderer, that particular robber) in order to be able to concretely and completely judge him. ... As the doctor studies not only the disease, but that particular patient, because this represents 'a clinical case', to which the most appropriate therapy must be practiced; so the judge, after having ascertained that a person has committed a crime, must study the unmistakable characteristics of the personality of that particular offender in order to impose on him the most appropriate sanction. If the culture of the criminal judge was limited to being exclusively juridical, criminal justice should deal only with the crime and not with the personality of its author. Ultimately, the criminal judge, in order to properly exercise his complex and delicate function, must assess not only the evidence concerning the crime (so-called judgment on the fact) but also the evidence concerning the suspect or accused person (so-called judgment on author of the fact)".

== Cultural area reference ==
A scholar of the main works of the Italian criminal tradition, starting with Cesare Beccaria who formed the "heart" of his legal library, Francesco Gianniti had particular interest in the works of Francesco Carrara and Enrico Ferri. In a speech at the international conference held in Lucca and Pisa in 1988, on the occasion of the centenary of the death of Carrara, he noted the significant convergence of the above two distinguished criminalists on the different function of law and criminal procedure; especially as the work of both was directed not to the systematic elaborations, but to the reform of the current penal legislation on the basis of new managerial criteria. According to Carrara, these were, "the dogmas of supreme reason, which existed before all human laws and which must be observed by the penal legislator". According to Ferri, however, they were the "criminal substitutes": that is, the reforms that must be carried out by means of laws concerning economic and political, civil and administrative, and which, in addition to favoring social evolution, tend to indirectly implement preventive defense against crime, especially opposing the factors social.

Francesco Gianniti collaborated for many years with the magazine Positive School. Well aware of the "irrevocable civil and juridical conquests of the classical School" - which he considered mainly represented by Carrara, Pellegrino Rossi, and Enrico Pessina - he recognized himself in the Positive School, which was anticipated by Gian Domenico Romagnosi, Carlo Cattaneo and Giovanni Bovio and represented mainly by Ferri, Cesare Lombroso and Raffaele Garofalo. However, he did not share either the denial of free will, supported by Ferri, nor the importance attributed by Lombroso to the somatic factors in the causal explanation of the criminal phenomenon. He attributed the merit to the Positive School: to have supported the need to resort to prevention before repression, the former being much more effective than the latter; to have moved the fulcrum of the penal law from the crime to the author of the criminal conduct, giving life and impulse to the criminological disciplines; to have affirmed the educational finalism of the penalty, anticipating a principle later consecrated in article 27 paragraph 3 of the Constitution of Italy.

He argued that the prevention measures (the so-called "criminal substitutes" of Ferri) are a more effective means of social defense than penalties in the fight against crime: "a provident civil and administrative legislation", can modify more effectively than penalties, "the factors social, economic and political, which prepare and facilitate crime". And it was persuaded that the prediction of a plurality of sanctions, the imposition of a punishment adequate to the personality of the subject, and a penitentiary treatment adapted to the personality of the condemned person were consistent with the spirit and values of the Constitution.

He used to remember with great pleasure the words pronounced by Pope John XXIII, during the audience of 21 November 1960: "The studies of criminal anthropology present a keen interest and should be encouraged for the high human value and morality, which they enclose".

== Biography ==
Francesco Gianniti was born of Pasquale Gianniti (1889–1976) and Maria Camerino (1891–1952). In his family, there had been convinced supporters of the Unification of Italy, who had played an active role during the Risorgimento. In particular, his great-grandfather Pasquale Gianniti (1830–1884), a doctor in law, in 1857, under the Bourbon government, had been restricted to the prisons of Oriolo for subversive activity, while his younger brother, Luigi Gianniti (1849–1870), had been Sergeant Major of the 40th Infantry Regiment and had fallen to Porta Pia on 20 September 1870.

He received his first training in Calabria, where he attended, in the years 1927–1932, the primary school in Oriolo, and then, in the years 1933–1940, the Classical High School Bernardino Telesio of Cosenza, where he was a pupil, among others, of Don Luigi Nicoletti. In October 1940, he enrolled in the Faculty of Law of the University of Rome. In 1943, he won the "Nicola Zanotti" award, because, in addition to having obtained the highest marks and praise in the commercial law exam with the professor Alberto Asquini, he presented the best average grade in the Faculty of Law.

On 28 July 1945, he graduated with honors, discussing with the professor Filippo Grispigni the thesis in criminal law on "The legitimacy of resistance to arbitrary acts of the Authority".

Two of his historical-juridical writings date to the years immediately following his graduation, which bear witness to his passion for history and sympathy for Mazzini's thought: "The Polish question at the Congress of Vienna in 1815" (1946) and "La Repubblica Romana of 1849" (1947); as well as the "Ricordi Coriglianesi" (1950), which contain a dozen poems with an autobiographical background.

On 20 December 1952 he met Caterina De Santis in Cosenza - daughter of Agostino De Santis, a doctor and honorary inspector of antiquities in Francavilla Marittima, and of Francesca Fasanella Masci, descendant of an old family - who then married on 13 June 1954 and with whom he had three children: Maria Giulia (1955), Daniela (1957), and Pasquale (1961).

His professional life - as a lawyer, judge, and university professor - developed between Rome, Corigliano Calabro, and Bologna. However, he always maintained a strong bond with his native village of Oriolo, where he used to spend his summer holidays gathering relatives and friends, and cultivating his studies.

== Forensic activity ==
In 1947, he obtained the forensic qualification at the Court of Appeal of Rome, where he carried out professional activities up to the date of entry into the judiciary.

In the years 1965 between 1985, he left the judiciary and resumed practice on the criminal activity in the criminal sector, as a lawyer authorized to practice before the Court of Cassation.

In 1973, he defended the producer Alberto Grimaldi and director Bernardo Bertolucci of the film Last tango in Paris in Cassation; they were acquitted by the Court of Bologna (sentence 2 February 1973) but condemned by the Court of Appeal of Bologna (sentence 4 June 1973) for competition in an obscene show. The Court of Cassation, in accepting the appeal, annulled the sentence with a reference to another section of the Court of Appeal of Bologna. Against the sentence handed down in the adjudication judgment on 26 September 1974, he filed new grounds for appeal to the Supreme Court.

In 1973, Francesco Gianniti defended Pier Paolo Pasolini - who had been acquitted by the Court of Benevento (ruling 20 October 1972) from the indictment of competition in an obscene show for the film The Canterbury Tales - before the Court of Appeal of Naples (sentence 2 July 1973), which confirmed the decision of acquittal delivered at the first instance. Following an appeal by the public prosecutor, he was the defender, together with attorney and professor Alfredo De Marsico, of director Pier Paolo Pasolini and producer Alberto Grimaldi in the judgment for Cassation. In both judgments, he supported the thesis that the provisions of article 529 paragraph 2 of the Italian Civil Code pen. ("The work of art is not considered obscene"), correctly interpreted, was applicable to the aforementioned films due to the presence in both of "artistic merits", which had taken care to identify and highlight and which had been recognized by a large part of the artistic, national, and foreign criticism.

== Judicial activity ==
On 11 March 1948, Gianniti entered the judiciary as "in charge of judicial functions", as the winner of the competition for titles issued with d.l.lgt. 30 April 1946.

He served as a magistrate in Corigliano Calabro from 15 September 1948 to 15 October 1950.

In 1950, he was among the first to pass the examination for judicial addition, issued by Ministerial Decree of 23 March 1950.

Gianniti moved to Bologna, where he worked under various roles: the functions of Pretore (from 28 October 1950 to 21 December 1951), investigating judge of the Criminal Court (from December 1951 to December 1955), judge of the first penal section of the Court and of the Court of Assizes of Bologna (from January 1956 to October 1959), and judge of the second civil section of the Court of Bologna (from October 1959 to 31 December 1962).

== Didactic and scientific activity ==
In November 1950, when Gianniti was a criminal magistrate in Bologna, he was introduced by Professor Filippo Grispigni to Professor Silvio Ranieri; on the latter's proposal, he was appointed voluntary assistant of criminal law at the University of Bologna and began educational and scientific activity.

To cultivate this activity was also encouraged by the professor Ernesto Battaglini, who would become judge of the Constitutional Court and who invited him to publish studies and articles in the journal Criminal Justice.

In 1959, he published his first monograph in criminal law, "I reati della stessa indole" ("The crimes of the same nature"), in which he carried out a systematic reconstruction of this conceptual category and, facing the problem of recidivism, claimed that the nature of the crimes is generally, but not necessarily, a symptom of a higher capacity to commit delinquency.

On 17 March 1961, he unanimously obtained the qualification for "free education" in criminal law.

In 1962, as assistant professor of criminal law at the University of Bologna, Gianniti won the national competition for a post of ordinary criminal law assistant in the same university and came to the crossroads of whether to continue in the magistracy or switch to a university career. His passion for scientific research prevailed, along with the desire for one day becoming a university chair, which for him was a symbol of intellectual nobility. On 1 February 1963, he left the judiciary to embark on a university career, which he pursued entirely at the University of Bologna.

In the three academic years of 1963–1966, Gianniti was a professor in charge of criminal law. The study on "L'oggetto materiale del reato" ("The material object of the crime") dates back to those years, published in 1966, in which he claimed that this element, on the one hand: "assumes particular importance in the general theory of crime, as it arises in numerous crimes such as constitutive element and in many others as an aggravating circumstance, while often it appears as a distinctive or specializing element of a crime compared to another "; and on the other hand, "represents a valid coefficient for the scientific elaboration of the special part [...] through the study of all the criminal figures who assume it, as an element, essential or accessory, in their structure".

In the following three years (1967–1970), Gianniti was a professor in charge of institutions of law and criminal procedure in the Faculty of Political Sciences of the University of Bologna. In 1970, he published the volume "Studi sulla corruzione del pubblico ufficiale" ("Studies on the corruption of the public official") in which three previous writings were collected: in the first, he determined the concept of utility, as a general concept of special part, on the basis of the comparative examination of the various provisions that provide; in the second, he illustrated the common elements and the differential characteristics between the German criminal law and the Italian criminal law on corruption; in the third, he faced the problem of corruption of the public official in the exercise of powers characterized by administrative discretion.

In 1972, he won the national competition for a post of full professor in the penalistic disciplines at the Faculty of Law of the University of Bologna and came to the crossroads between continuing the study and teaching of criminal law, or moving to the study and teaching of criminal procedure. He opted for the latter, writing, "The change of subject made me think of the university doctor who, after having spent several years in medical clinic, suddenly goes to the surgical clinic".

His first monographs of criminal procedure date to the 1970s with "Prospettive criminologiche e processo penale" ("Criminological Perspectives and Criminal Process"), published in 1977, in which he supported the necessity of developing an organic program of criminal policy (in the substantive, procedural, and execution fields of the pena), as well as the examination of the personality of the offender in the criminal trial (before, during and after the trial phase). In 1979, he published "Controversie in tema di giudizio direttissimo" ("Controversies in the matter of a very direct judgment"), in which he examined this special judgment, framing it as a typical example of an accusatory process in the predominantly inquisitorial system of the then-current code of procedure.

From 1 November 1973 to 31 October 1991, he held the chair of criminal procedure at the Faculty of Law of the University of Bologna: first as an extraordinary professor, then from 1978, as an ordinary professor.

As the holder of the penal procedure, in addition to university courses, he held:

- annual courses of practice in criminal proceedings at the "Enrico Redenti" forensic application institute of Bologna (1973–1991);
- annual courses of lessons, first of all on "criminal trial and administrative process" and then on "crimes against public administration" at the School of specialization in administrative sciences in Bologna (1977–1988);
- annual lecture courses on "penitentiary legal medicine", on "criminological medicine" and, finally, on "criminal legal medicine" to graduates in medicine and surgery at the School of specialization in forensic medicine of the University of Bologna (1978–1991).

Gianniti's monographs which date to the 1980s include: "Introduzione allo studio interdisciplinare del processo penale" ("Introduction to the interdisciplinary study of the criminal process"), published in 1986, in which he examined the relations that the science of the criminal process presents with the other branches of the legal system; and "I rapporti tra processo civile e processo penale" ("Relations between the civil process and the criminal trial"), published in 1988, in which, continuing the previous work, he carried out a comparative examination between various institutions and procedural concepts, both civil and criminal.

As a professor of criminal procedure, Gianniti and his collaborators were the promoters of a working method, based on a collegial confrontation, characterized by periodic meetings in which there was talk of scientific questions, organization of teaching, or other initiatives related to teaching activity. And, in relation with the students, he pursued three objectives: to transform, at least in part, the teaching classes in "interviews with the students"; to accompany the students of each course, at least once, to the Court and the Court of Appeals to attend the criminal hearings and then draw reasons for reflection in class on the complex relations between criminal law, criminal trial, and judicial policy; and finally, the goal of encouraging the most willing students to become active subjects of the lessons, inviting them to relate to the content of the research carried out.

In 1985, he founded a post-graduate school in Bologna (called Centro Studi Address Magistratura Avvocatura), which he continued until 2009. In that school, over the years, several hundred young graduates prepared for the written tests of the competition for the judiciary and the examination for the qualification for the legal profession. Expressions of this activity were the volumes "Guida all'esame per avvocato" ("Guide for the exam for lawyer") (Giuffrè, 2006) and "Guida al concorso per magistrato ordinario" ("Guide to the competition for ordinary magistrate") (Cedam, 2008). Some of the methodological advice he used to impart to his students is now, by his will, fully and freely available online.

On 31 October 1996, he was placed "at rest" as an ordinary professor, but continued his teaching and scientific activities. As a teacher, he continued to teach law and criminal procedure within the CSIMA School until 2009. From a scientific point of view, he carried out further studies on the criminal trial and its relations with the criminological disciplines. Dating to 1997, his monograph, "Aspetti problematici del processo penale" ("Problematic aspects of the criminal trial"), highlights the positive and negative aspects of the criminal trial, with particular reference to the "instructive powers" of the public prosecutor and to alternative "inquisitorial" rites, while also examining the "derogations" to the trial and to the parts process. In 2007, his monograph, "Sistema penale e problemi criminologici" ("Criminal System and Criminological Problems"), illustrated the relationships between criminal law, criminal procedural law, and criminal disciplines, and carried out, with the comparative method, topics of general and special part of the criminal law. Finally, in 2011, at the age of ninety years old, Gianniti published his latest monograph, "Criminalistica" ("Criminalistic"), in which he argued that "to study, with deductive-rational method, the offense as a legal entity must be accompanied by the study, with experimental inductive method, of the crime as human and social reality, so that, on the one hand, the diagnosis of the personality and the prognosis of the dangerousness of the subject that delinque and, secondly, the social defense, as protection of the community and of the injured person, take on importance".

== Honors and awards ==
Francesco Gianniti was, since 1968, Member of Honor of the Society of Criminal Law and Criminology of Buenos Aires; since 1977, corresponding member of the Cosentina Academy Bernardino Telesio; from 1993 to 2005, Magistrate for the judgment of the union action of the Republic of San Marino.

In 2013, in his honor, the book Francesco Gianniti. Una vita in tre toghe (Francesco Gianniti - A life in three togas) was published by Antonio Benvenuto (presented in Corigliano on 29 June 2013, during a conference on Avvocatura e Magistratura, organized by the Civil Chamber of Rossano). In the preface, the author - based on historical research - draws the profile of Francesco Gianniti when he was Pretore in Corigliano (1948–1950) as a young man of vast culture, juridical and humanistic, and warm humanity. Meanwhile, the appendix outlines the subsequent existential path, characterized by the centrality of family and by his passion for work, understood as an opportunity to serve others. The author writes: "The title is inspired by the many professional experiences - as Magistrate, Lawyer and University Professor - of this son of Calabria, who, with his multi-faceted professional activity, has honored the territory of Sibaritide".

== Works ==
=== Monographs of criminal law ===
- I reati della stessa indole, Milan, Giuffrè, 1959, pp. VIII-204. (The crimes of the same nature)
- L'oggetto materiale del reato, Milan, Giuffrè, 1966, pp. XI-215. (The material object of the crime)
- Studi sulla corruzione del pubblico ufficiale, Milan, Giuffrè, 1970, pp. VIII-179. (Studies on the corruption of the public official)
- Sistema penale e problemi criminologici, Rimini, Maggioli, 2007, pp. 466 (in collaboration with Pasquale Gianniti), ISBN 978-88-387-2390-2. (Criminal system and criminological problems)
- Criminalistica, Milano, Giuffrè, 2011, pp. XVI – 250, ISBN 88-14-15532-1. (Criminalistic)

=== Monographs of criminal procedural law ===
- Prospettive criminologiche e processo penale, Milan, Giuffrè, 1977, III ediz., 1984, pp. XIII-314, ISBN 88-14-00052-2. (Criminological perspectives and criminal trial)
- Controversie in tema di giudizio direttissimo, Milan, Giuffrè, 1979, IV ediz., 1986, pp. XII-236, ISBN 88-14-00824-8. (Disputes on the subject of direct judgment)
- Introduzione allo studio interdisciplinare del processo penale, Milan, Giuffrè, 1986, II ediz., 1988, pp. X-194, ISBN 88-14-01767-0. (Introduction to the interdisciplinary study of the criminal trial)
- I rapporti tra processo civile e processo penale, Milan, Giuffrè, 1988, pp. XII-248, ISBN 88-14-01751-4. (Relations between the civil trial and the criminal trial)
- Aspetti problematici del processo penale, Turin, Giappichelli, 1997, pp. VI – 175, ISBN 88-348-7042-5. (Problematic aspects of the criminal trial)

=== Guides to the competition for ordinary magistrate and lawyer exam ===
- Guida all'esame di avvocato, Milan, Giuffrè, 2006, pp. 144 (in collaboration with Pasquale Gianniti), ISBN 88-14-13165-1. (Guide to the lawyer's exam)
- Guida al concorso per magistrato ordinario, Padova, Cedam, 2008, pp. XIII – 231 (in collaboration with Pasquale Gianniti), ISBN 978-88-13-28319-3. (Guide to the competition for ordinary magistrate)

=== Minor writings ===
- L'esecuzione arbitraria di lavori in fondo altrui, in Scuola pos., 1951, pp. 82-100.
- Il delitto di ragion fattasi in relazione ai diritti potestativi, in Giust. pen., 1952, parte II, cc. 411–420.
- L'esercizio abusivo di attività rumorosa, in Giust. pen., 1953, parte II, cc. 219–224.
- L'efficacia del consenso e il concorso di reati in relazione alle varie forme di ratto, in Giust. pen., 1954, parte II, cc. 592–597.
- Il problema della specializzazione del personale per la prevenzione della criminalità (intervention carried out in the Conference of legal studies on the problems of prevention, held in Bologna, May 15–16, 1954), in Critica pen., 1954, pp. 284–288.
- Anormalità e imputabilità dei delinquenti costituzionali, in Giust. pen., 1955, parte I, cc. 332–341.
- Metodologia giuridica e dogmatica processuale penale, in Giust. pen., 1957, parte I, cc. 481–486.
- L'esercizio individuale della prostituzione nella propria abitazione privata, in Scuola pos., 1960, pp. 43–57.
- La fattispecie legale a condotta fungibile, in Scuola pos., 1961, pp. 653–682.
- Inammissibilità del concorso tra le ipotesi criminose del favoreggiamento e dello sfruttamento della prostituzione altrui, in Scuola pos., 1962, pp. 159–160.
- Recidiva (voce), in Enciclopedia forense, Milan, Vallardi, vol. VI, 1961, pp. 271–274.
- Controversie in tema di recidiva, in Scuola pos., 1963, pp. 263–281.
- Valore sintomatico e criterio oggettivo nell'accertamento dell'omogeneità dei reati, in Scuola pos., 1963, pp. 709–712.
- Il concetto di "utilità" nel diritto penale, in Scuola pos., 1967, pp. 196–257.
- I delitti di corruzione nella dottrina e nella legislazione germanica, in Scuola pos., 1969, pp. 55–88.
- Il problema della corruzione del pubblico ufficiale dotato di potere discrezionale, in Scuola pos., 1969, pp. 173–198.
- La problematica penale nel saggio critico di Giovanni Bovio, in Scuola pos., 1972, pp. 453–480.
- Sulla nozione del termine "ricevere" rispetto al delitto di ricettazione, in Giur. it., 1973, parte II, cc. 273–274.
- Rapporti tra la norma dell'art. 440 c.p. e le contravvenzioni sanitarie in materia di inquinamento delle acque, in "Gli inquinamenti. Profili penali", Milan, Giuffrè, 1974, pp. 113–117.
- Le misure di prevenzione nelle prospettive positiviste e nella loro realizzazione normativa (communication carried out in the IX Study Conference "Enrico de Nicola", held in Alghero, 26–28 April 1974), in Le misure di prevenzione, Milano, Giuffrè, 1975, pp. 161–169.
- L'opera scientifica di Silvio Ranieri e problemi attuali di politica criminale (speech held November 22, 1975 in the Academy of Sciences of the Institute of Bologna), in Arch. pen., 1976, pp. 144–166.
- Il problema della divisione del processo penale in due fasi, in Giust. pen., 1976, parte I, cc. 161–167.
- L'importanza della psicologia e della sociologia nel processo penale, in "Studi in memoria di Girolamo Bellavista", in Il Tommaso Natale, Palermo, 1977, pp. 209–225.
- Assistenza sanitaria ospedaliera e responsabilità penale dei docenti universitari, in "Studi in onore di Giovanni Musotto", Palermo, 1980, vol. III, pp. 83–88.
- Rilievi critici e proposte di riforma al codice Rocco, in La questione criminale, 1981, pp. 289–296.
- La responsabilità penale in tema di opere provvisionali, in Critica pen., 1983, pp. 13–19.
- Consensi e dissensi in tema di giudizio direttissimo, in Studi in onore di Tito Carnacini, Milano, Giuffrè, 1984, vol. III, 125–155; as well as in Giust. pen., 1981, parte III, cc. 227–243.
- Giudizio direttissimo (voce), in Dizionario di diritto e procedura penale, directed by Giuliano Vassalli, Milano, Giuffrè, 1986, pp. 335–379.
- I rapporti tra querela civile di falso e l'incidente penale di falso, in Arch. pen., 1987, pp. 39–44.
- Francesco Carrara e la Scuola positiva (intervention carried out at the International Conference held in Lucca and Pisa from 2 to 5 June 1988), in Francesco Carrara nel primo centenario dalla morte, Milano, Giuffrè, 1991, pp. 645–650.
- La poliedrica figura del giudice per le indagini preliminari, in Indice pen., 1989, pp. 603–614.
- I quattro pericoli (intervento svolto nel Convegno tenuto a Saint-Vincent il 10 marzo 1990), in Processo al nuovo processo, edited by Jader Jacobelli, Bari, Laterza, 1990, pp. 74–80.
- Il nuovo processo penale: profili comparatistici, in Studi in memoria di Pietro Nuvolone, Milano, Giuffrè, 1991, vol. III, pp. 633–639.
- L'esame della personalità del reo nel nuovo processo penale, in Studi in onore di Giuliano Vassalli, Milan, Giuffrè, 1991, vol. II, pp. 439–443.
- Alcune proposte di riforma al cod. proc. pen. del 1988, in Giust. pen., 1992, parte III, cc. 263–266.
- Le deroghe alla prova dibattimentale nel nuovo processo penale, in Riv. dir. proc., 1993, pp. 120–135.
- Spunti per una ricostruzione del sistema probatorio penale, in Scritti in onore di Elio Fazzalari, Milan, Giuffrè, 1993, vol. IV, 527–548; as well as in Riv. It. dir. e proc. pen., 1994, pp. 77–94.
- Consigli e suggerimenti per la preparazione agli esami di uditore giudiziario e di procuratore legale, Bologna, Emmegi edizioni, 1994, pp. 149.
- Luci ed ombre del nuovo processo penale, Bologna, Emmegi edizioni, 1994, pp. 210.
- L'efficacia della sentenza penale di assoluzione nel giudizio civile di danno, in Studi in ricordo di Gian Domenico Pisapia, Milan, Giuffrè, 2000, vol II, pp. 321–325.
- Esami e tirocinio per magistratura e avvocatura, Milan, Giuffrè, (1997), II ediz., 2001, pp. 301 (in collaboration with con Pasquale Gianniti).
- Scriminanti, scusanti ed esimenti, in Scritti in memoria di Marino Barbero Santos, Cuenca, Edizioni Università De Castilla – La Mancha e Salamanca, 2001, vol. I, pp. 1071–1077.
- La rilevanza della "parte speciale" nel sistema del diritto penale, in Critica pen., 2004, pp. 137–142 (in collaboration with Pasquale Gianniti).
- L'esame della personalità del soggetto e specializzazione criminologica del giudice penale, in Critica pen., 2005, pp. 9–22 (in collaboration with Pasquale Gianniti).
- La rilevanza del metodo comparativo nello studio della parte generale, in Critica pen., 2005, pp. 123–142 (in collaboration with Pasquale Gianniti).
- La rilevanza del metodo comparativo nello studio della parte speciale, in Critica pen., 2005, pp. 219–238 (in collaboration with Pasquale Gianniti).
- Le dottrine criminalistiche dopo Cesare Beccaria, in Giust. pen., 2007, parte II, cc. 609–617.
- La legittima resistenza agli atti arbitrari dell'Autorità, in La disciplina dell'autotutela (by Pasquale Gianniti), Padova, Cedam, 2010, pp. 368–418.
- Norme penali miste e omogeneità dei reati, in Critica pen., 2010, pp. 31–54 (in collaboration with Pasquale Gianniti).
- Le discipline giuridiche penalistiche e le discipline sperimentali criminologiche, in Giust. pen., 2017, parte II, cc. 672–689

=== Youth writings ===
- La questione polacca al Congresso di Vienna del 1815 (1946), in Antonio Benvenuto, Francesco Gianniti. Una vita in tre toghe, Corigliano (CS), Aurora, 2013, p. 149
- La Repubblica Romana del 1849 (1947), in Antonio Benvenuto, Francesco Gianniti. Una vita in tre toghe, Corigliano (CS), Aurora, 2013, p. 19
- Ricordi coriglianesi (1950), in Antonio Benvenuto, Francesco Gianniti. Una vita in tre toghe, Corigliano (CS), Aurora, 2013, p. 39

== Bibliography ==
- Francesco Gianniti, I reati della stessa indole, Milan, Giuffrè, 1959, pp. VIII, 204.
- Enrico Altavilla, review to: Francesco Gianniti, I reati della stessa indole, in Scuola Pos., 1961, p. 401.
- Antonio Rossi, review: Francesco Gianniti, L'oggetto materiale del reato, in La Calabria giudiziaria, 1967, pp. 234–237.
- Karl Siegert, review: Francesco Gianniti, Studi sulla corruzione del pubblico ufficiale, in Scuola Pos., 1971, pp. 477–478.
- Giuseppe Guarneri, review: Francesco Gianniti, Prospettive criminologiche e processo penale, in La giustizia penale, 1977, pp. 331–335.
- Romano Ricciotti, review to: Francesco Gianniti, Prospettive criminologiche e processo penale, in Critica giudiziaria, 1977, pp. 167–172.
- Francesco Gianniti, Prospettive criminologiche e processo penale, Milan, Giuffrè, (1977), III ediz., 1984.
- Francesco Gianniti - Pasquale Gianniti, Sistema penale e problemi criminologici, Rimini, Maggioli, 2007.
- Romano Ricciotti, review to: Francesco Gianniti, Sistema penale e problemi criminologici, in Critica pen., 2007, pp. 278–280.
- Francesco Gianniti, Criminalistica, Milan, Giuffré, 2011.
- Romano Ricciotti, review to: Francesco Gianniti, Criminalistica, in Critica pen., 2010, p. 295.
- Sergio Lorusso, review: Francesco Gianniti, Criminalistica, in La Corte d'Assise, 2011, pp. 381–383.
- Santino Cambria, review: Francesco Gianniti, Criminalistica, in Rivista medica italiana di psicoterapia ed ipnosi, 2011, pp. 298–301, as well as in Sociologia urbana e rurale, 2011, pp. 135–137.
- Pasquale Vincenzo Molinari, review: Francesco Gianniti, Criminalistica, in Gli oratori del giorno, 2011, p. 62-64.
- Ernesto D'Ippolito, review: Francesco Gianniti, Criminalistica, in Iniziativa, 2011, p. 4.
- Gaetano De Amicis, review: Francesco Gianniti, Criminalistica, in the online magazine Diritto Penale Contemporaneo, 2012.
- Giuliano Vassalli, commentary on: Francesco Gianniti, Criminal System and Criminological Problems, in Antonio Benvenuto, Francesco Gianniti. Una vita in tre toghe, 2013, p. 218.
- Antonio Benvenuto, Francesco Gianniti. Una vita in tre toghe, Corigliano (CS), Aurora, 2013, p. 253, ISBN 978-88-88271-51-4.
- Renzo Orlandi, Ricordo di Francesco Gianniti, in Giust. pen., 2017, part I, cc. 289–290.
