= Vincenzo Consani =

Italian sculptor

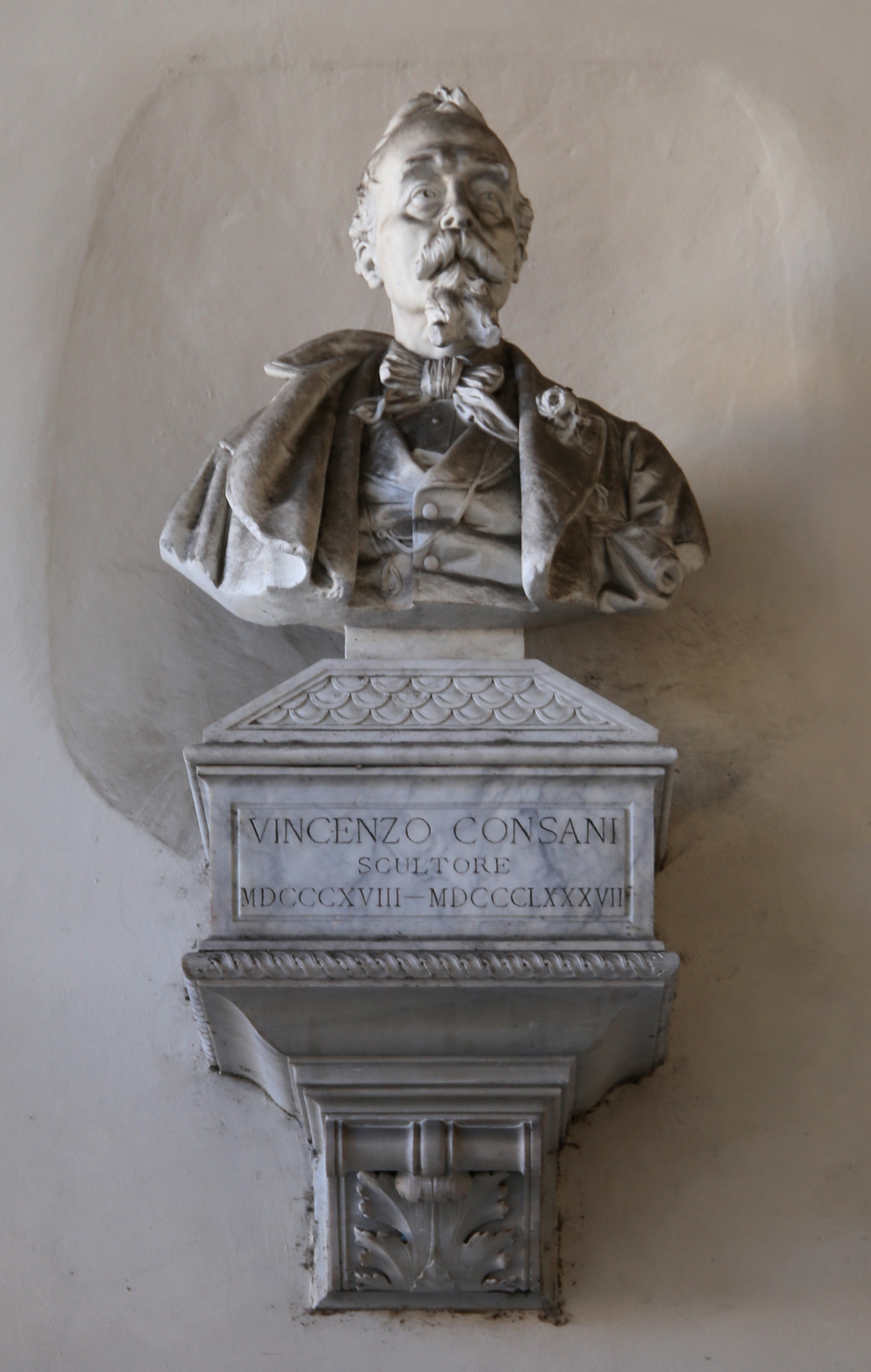
- Born: April 24, 1818; Lucca, Italy
- Died: June 29, 1887 (aged 69); Florence
- Occupation: Sculptor

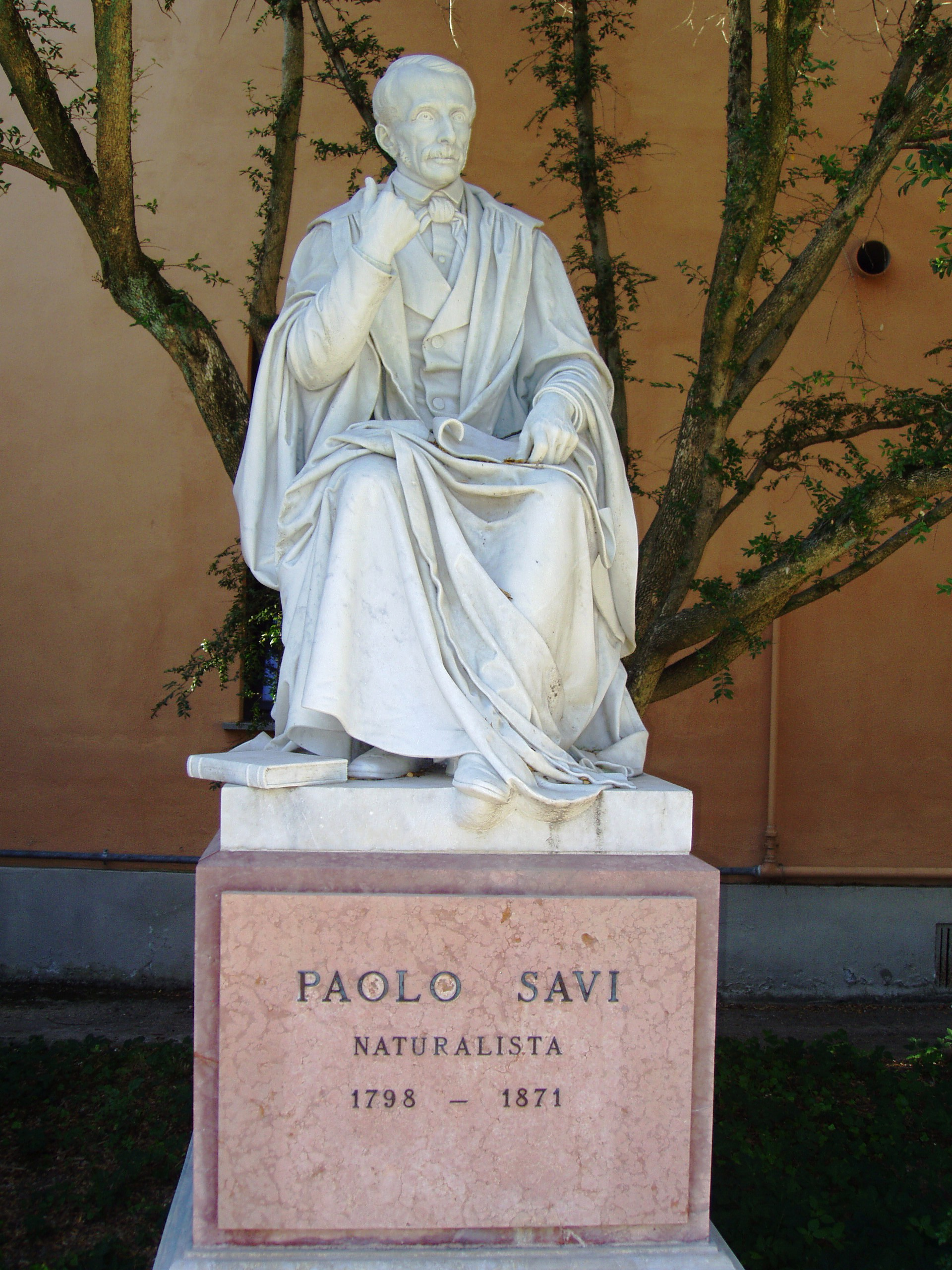
Vincenzo Consani, Monument to Paolo Savi (Pisa, Orto Botanico).

Vincenzo Consani (1818-1888) was an Italian sculptor from the Canova school. Consani's marble masterpiece statue Vittoria (1859) is in the Pitti Palace in Florence.

== Early life ==
Consani was born in Lucca, Italy on April 24, 1818. He was a student of Luigi Pampaloni as well as a professor at the Academy of Fine Arts in Florence. Vincenzo Consani also fought in a Tuscan battalion in 1848.

== Sculptor ==
As a young man, he had the favor of the Ducal family of Lucca, for whom he created numerous works including an image of the Immaculate Conception in the gable of a side door at the church of St Alexander.

For the portico of the Uffizi in 1856, he sculpted the statue of Father Antonio Micheli. In the Florentine exhibition of 1861, he exhibited a bust of Sappho which is still in the Pitti Palace and the Wounded Amazon which is at the Quirinale. The Hall of Jupiter at the Pitti Palace hosts one of his masterpieces that the government of Tuscany donated to Vittorio Emanuele II in 1867. In 1870, Consani made the monument to the Marquis Antonio Mazzarosa in Santa Maria Forisportam in Lucca. In 1873 he produced the statue of Antonio Rosmini in Rovereto and the almost-contemporary sarcophagus with the recumbent figure of Countess Matilda in San Giovanni di Lucca.

His last works were the statue of the naturalist, Paolo Savi, situated in the cemetery of Pisa, one of Eugene IV in the facade of the cathedral of Florence and the bust of the architect Emilio De Fabris in the interior of the same cathedral.

Consani died in Florence on June 29, 1887.
