= San Ponziano =

San Ponziano may refer to:

- San Ponziano, Lucca, church
- San Ponziano, Rome, church
- San Ponziano, Spoleto, monastery
- Pope Pontian, Christian saint
