= IMT School for Advanced Studies Lucca =

Organization

- Scuola IMT Alti Studi Lucca
- Type: Public
- Established: 2005; 21 years ago
- Director: Rocco De Nicola
- Address: Piazza San Ponziano, 6, Lucca, Italy; 43.7196°N 10.4002°E
- Campus: Urban
- Working language: English
- Website: www.imtlucca.it

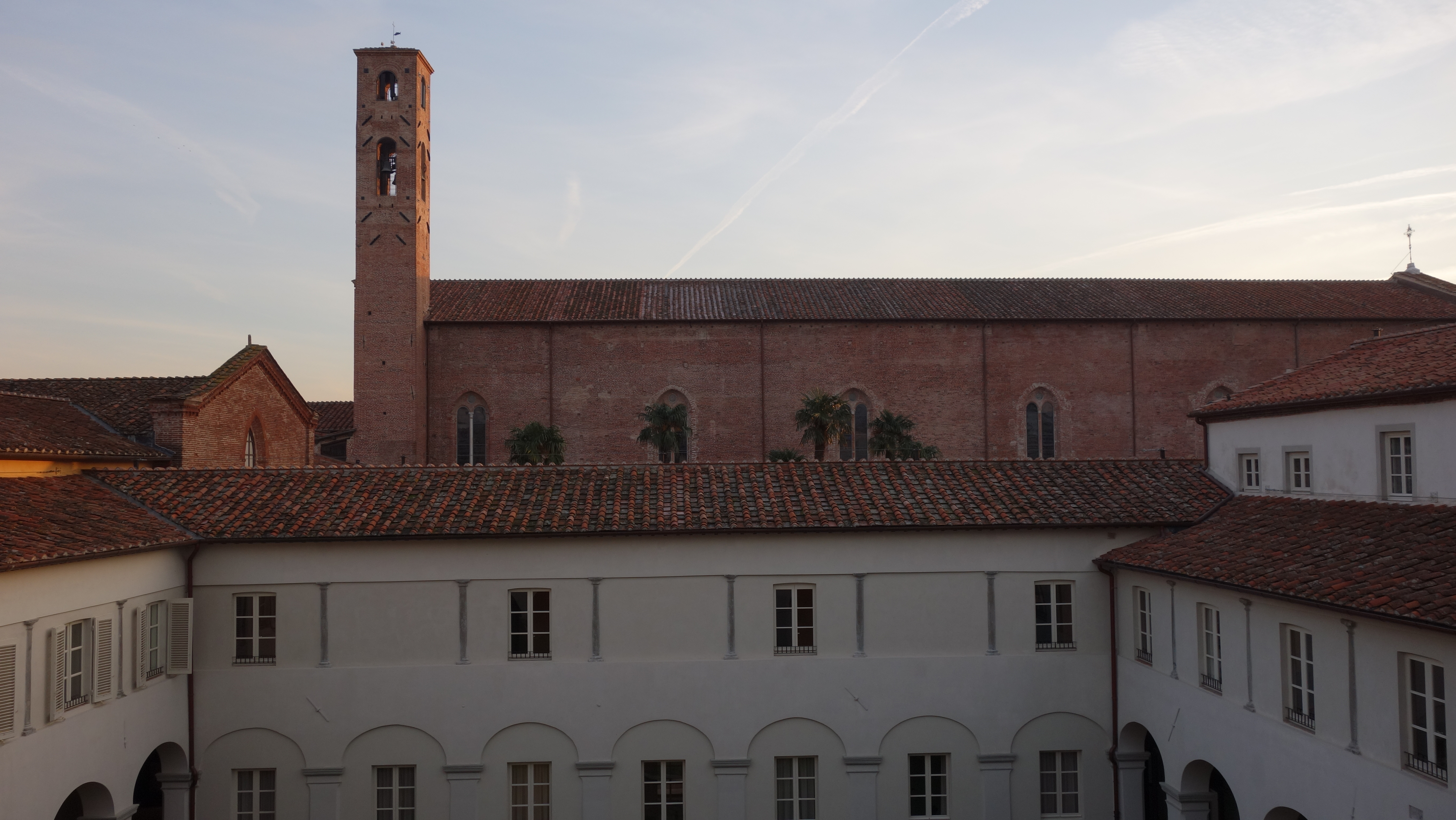
IMT School Campus with a view over the San Francesco Church

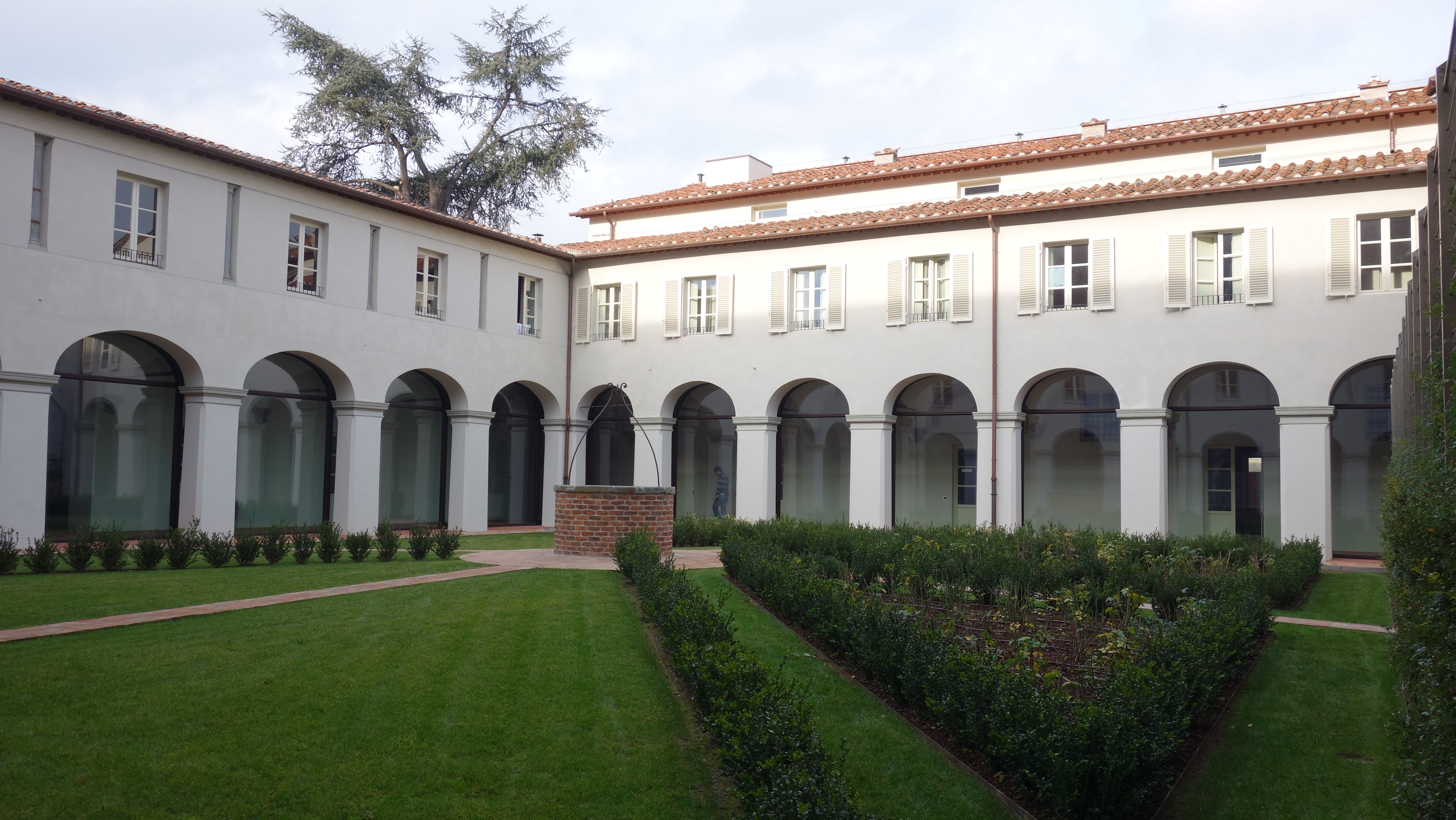
IMT School San Francesco Campus Courtyard

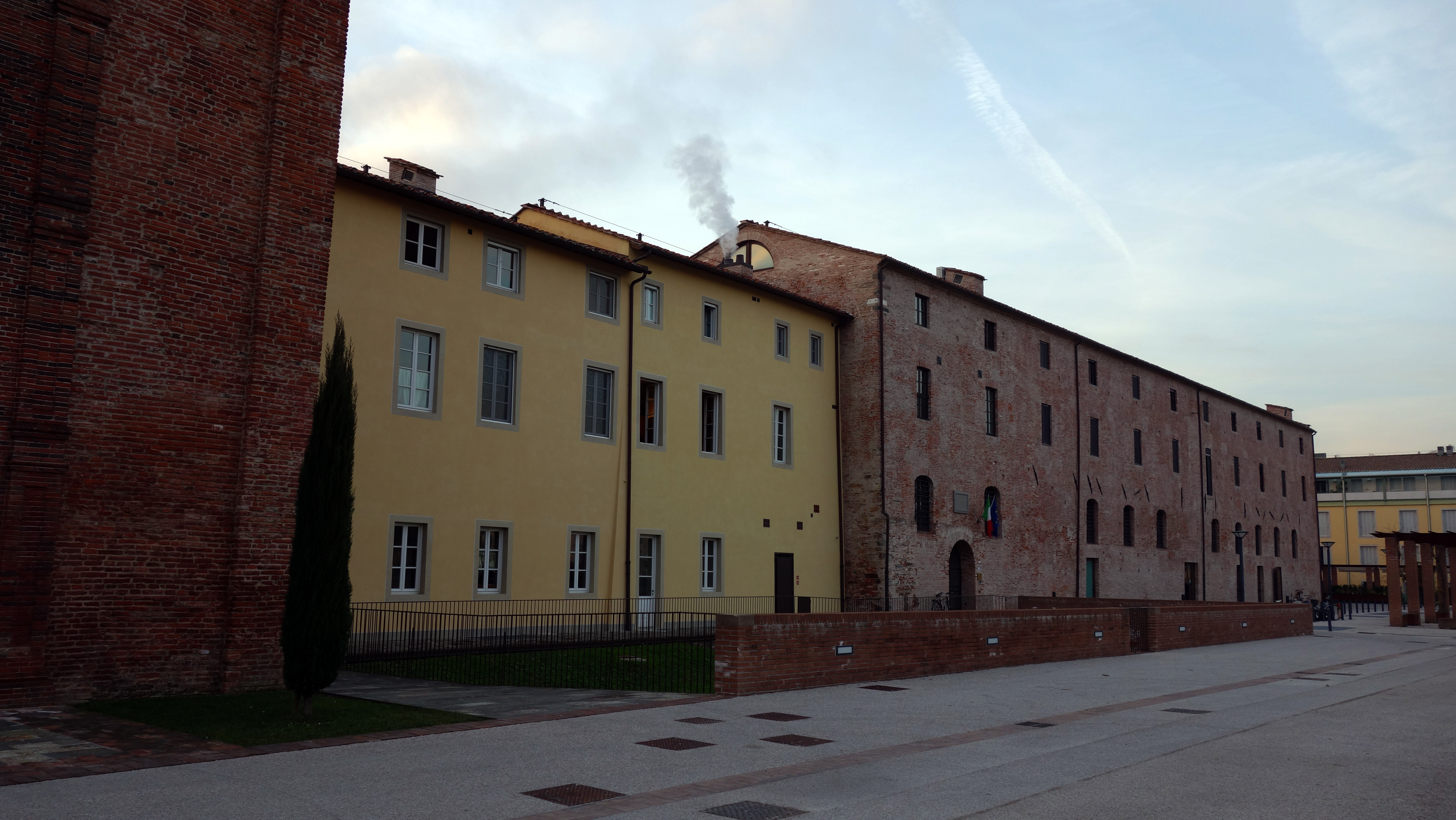
IMT School San Francesco Dormitories

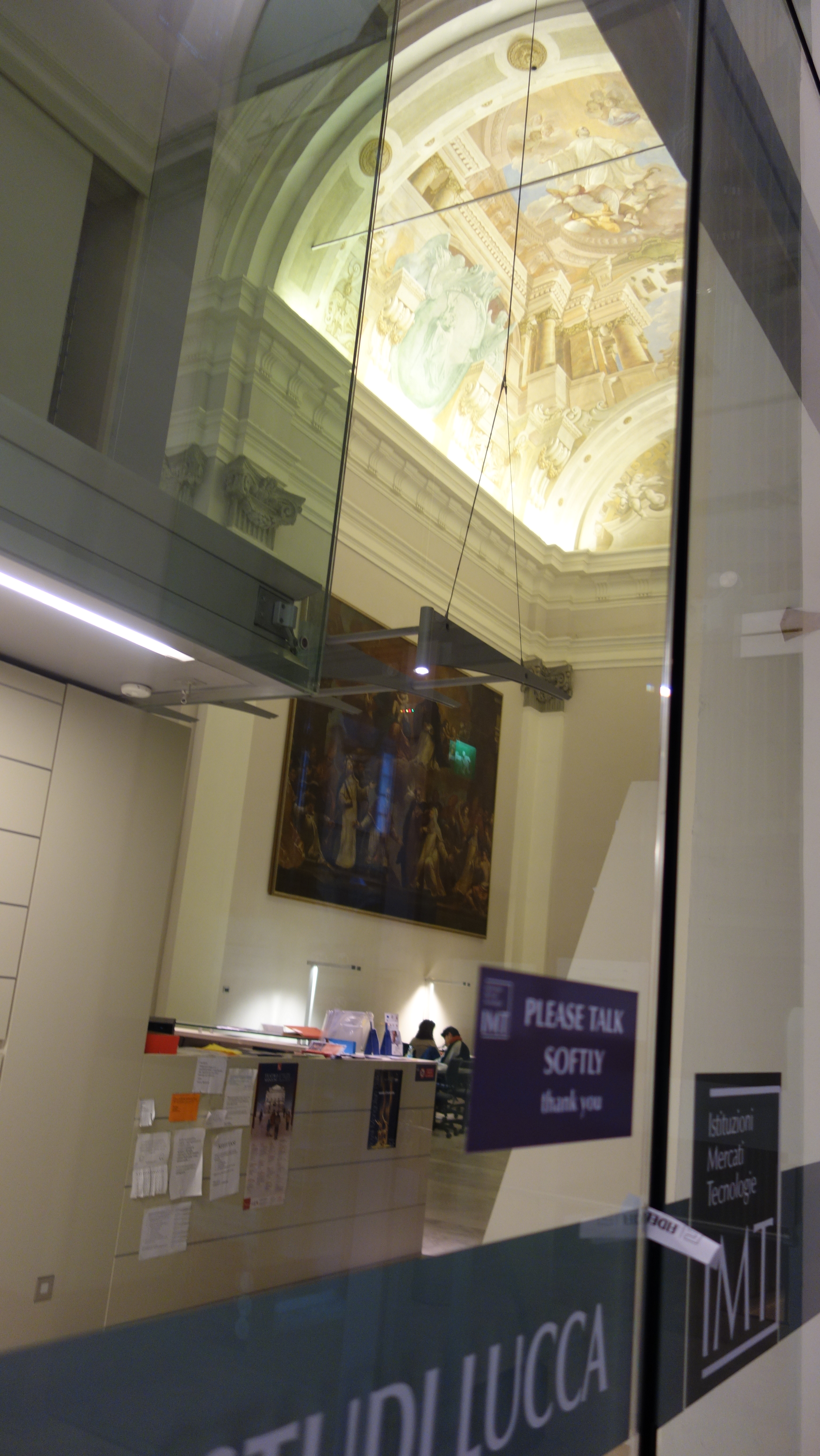
IMT School Library View

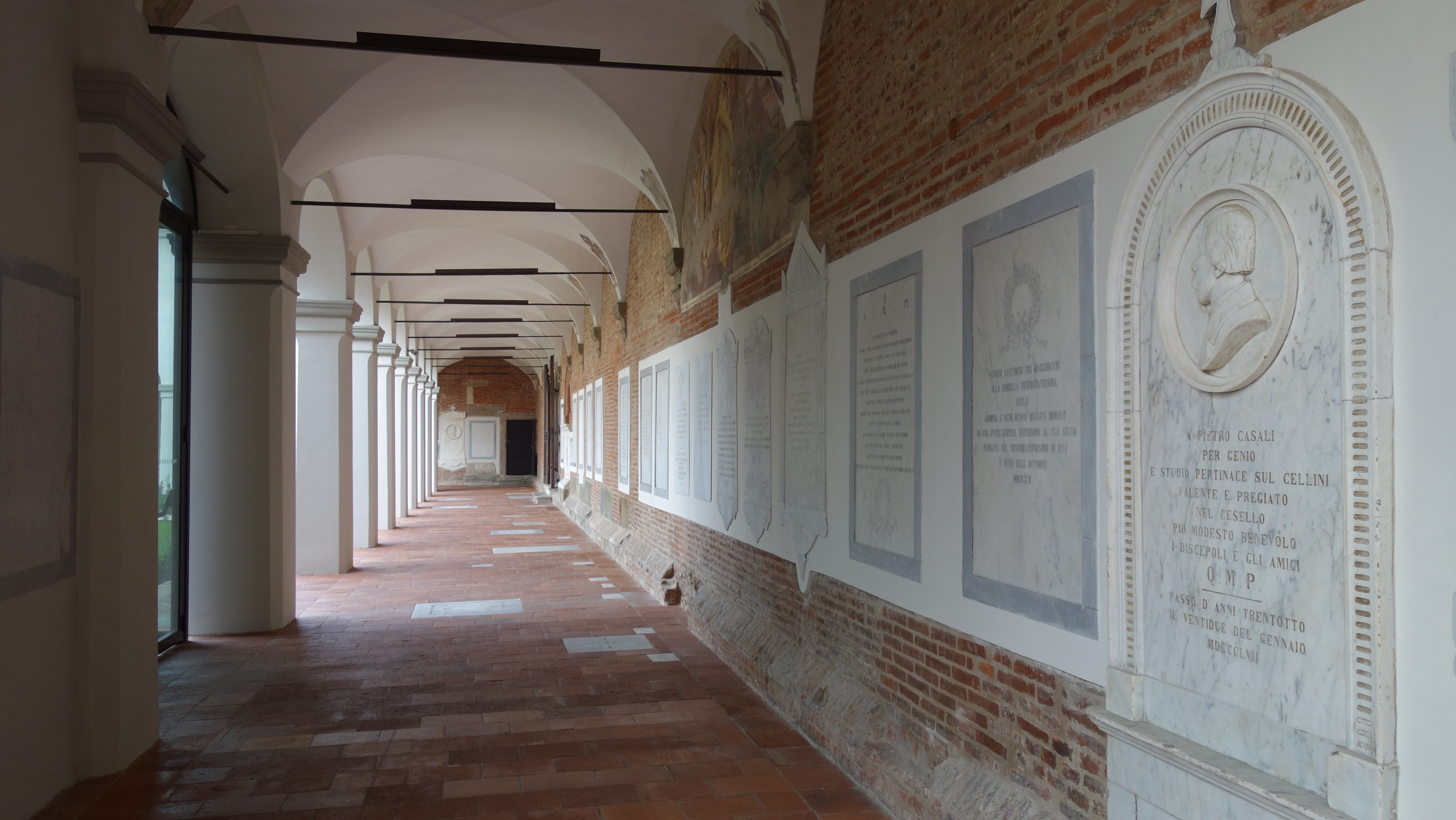
IMT School San Francesco Passageway

IMT School for Advanced Studies Lucca (Italian: Scuola IMT Alti Studi Lucca) is a public research institution and a graduate school located in Lucca, Italy. It was founded in 2005 under the name of IMT Institute for Advanced Studies (Institutions, Markets, Technologies). The school is part of the Italian superior graduate school system and its main Campus is located in the San Francesco Complex within the historic city walls of Lucca.

As an institution for advanced studies, IMT Lucca hosts researchers who carry out methodological research, held to high scientific standards, leading to the development of new knowledge.

Its international advisory board includes a number of prominent scientists, including Giulio Tononi, Alfio Quarteroni and Adina L. Roskies.

== History ==
The desire of Lucca to have its own university dates back to 1369, when Emperor Charles IV gave an official dispensation to the Republic of Lucca to establish a "Studium Generale" in the city. In 1387 this concession was countersigned and confirmed by Pope Urban VI, yet despite these attempts, the university never succeeded and eventually failed. A second attempt to establish a University of Lucca was made in 1785 and was slightly more successful offering courses in law, medicine, mathematics, engineering and philosophy. This university was reformed during the Duchy of Maria Luisa of Spain, where it became the "Real Liceo" however the history of the Real Liceo was interrupted in 1847, following the incorporation of the Duchy of Lucca into the Grand Duchy of Tuscany in 1847, disappearing definitively in 1867 shortly before the completion of the Risorgimento. IMT Lucca thus represents the third attempt to found a university in Lucca.

== Academics ==
The multidisciplinary PhD programs of IMT Lucca, integrates scientific competences of economics, engineering, computer science, physics, applied mathematics, statistics, history and sciences of cultural heritage. It offers a characteristic patrimony of competences within the broad framework of the analysis and management of a plurality of systems. Originally envisaged as three-year programmes, since 2019 the programmes are articulated in curricula of four years. The 4 curricula currently offered are field-specific, although in many instances they share a common scientific background. Candidates can apply for one (or more) of the following curricula:

- Economics, Management Science and Complex Systems
- Computer Science and System Engineering
- Neuroscience
- Cultural Heritage

IMT Lucca concentrates its activities within a limited number of key areas. Moreover, the school recruits its faculty on a competitive international scale, evaluating, among other elements, their capacity to publish work in top level international peer-reviewed and high-impact journals.

IMT Lucca also offers a master's degree in bionic engineering, in collaboration with the University of Pisa and Scuola Superiore Sant'Anna, a doctoral program in data science together with Scuola Normale Superiore, Scuola Superiore Sant'Anna, University of Pisa and the National Research Council-CNR. The school offers also a master's program in data science and statistical learning, together with the Florence Center for Data Science (University of Florence).

Moreover, during the academic year the school organizes seminars, workshops, summer and winter schools.

== Research ==
IMT Lucca's scientific activity is organized in thematic research units that carry out interdisciplinary projects. Currently, the research units of the school are:

- AXES – Laboratory for the Analysis of Complex Economic Systems
- DYSCO – Dynamical Systems, Control, and Optimization
- LYNX – Center for the interdisciplinary Analysis of Images
- MUSAM – Multi-scale Analysis of Materials
- NETWORKS – Network Theory, Theory of Modern Statistical Physics, Economic and Financial Systems
- MOMILAB – Molecular Mind Laboratory
- SysMA – System Modelling and Analysis

IMT Lucca also houses a research unit of the National Institute of High Mathematics – INdAM, with which it collaborates for the promotion of scientific research and higher education in mathematical disciplines.

== Student and Alumni Association ==
Since 2016, IMT Lucca's graduates can join the Alumni Association. The association was founded in the aim of fostering relationships between students and alumni and promoting the values of the IMT Lucca in the world. External members can also be admitted for their professional and scientific merits or as financial backers.

== Campus and facilities ==
=== San Francesco Complex ===
IMT Lucca residential Campus is located in the San Francesco Complex, a former Franciscan convent built around the 13th century. The building, in its current configuration, was inaugurated in 2013 after an important restoration work accomplished by Fondazione Cassa di Risparmio di Lucca. The modern complex houses the students’ rooms, a guesthouse for external guests, offices of teachers and researchers, classrooms for teaching and the canteen of IMT Lucca. Some of the old spaces – such as the Church of San Francesco, the Guinigi Chapel and the sacristy of the former Convent – are still used to host events, seminars and meetings.

=== San Ponziano Complex ===
IMT Lucca headquarter is located in the Complex of San Ponziano, a former music conservatory named after the Lucca musician Luigi Boccherini. The Complex houses the administrative offices, a library, two meeting rooms and a multidisciplinary laboratory equipped to carry out cognitive-behavioral experiments.

=== Library ===
The IMT Lucca Library is located next to the San Ponziano Complex. The access to the library, as well as its loan and consultation services, are free not only for professors, researchers and PhD students, but also for the external public. The building has undergone a recent restoration by the architect Stefano Dini, whose project won the Jury Prize at the 2007 European Aluminum Awards.

== Rankings ==
IMT Lucca is monitored yearly by U-Multirank, an independent ranking supported by the European Commission. Research, knowledge transfer and internationalization are the areas in which the school stands out.

== Notable alumni ==
- Marc Botenga

== See also ==
- List of Italian universities
- Superior Graduate Schools in Italy
- Sant'Anna School of Advanced Studies
- University of Pisa
- San Francesco, Lucca
- San Ponziano, Lucca
