= San Ponziano, Lucca =

Church in Lucca, Italy

Coordinates: 43°50′35″N 10°30′46″E

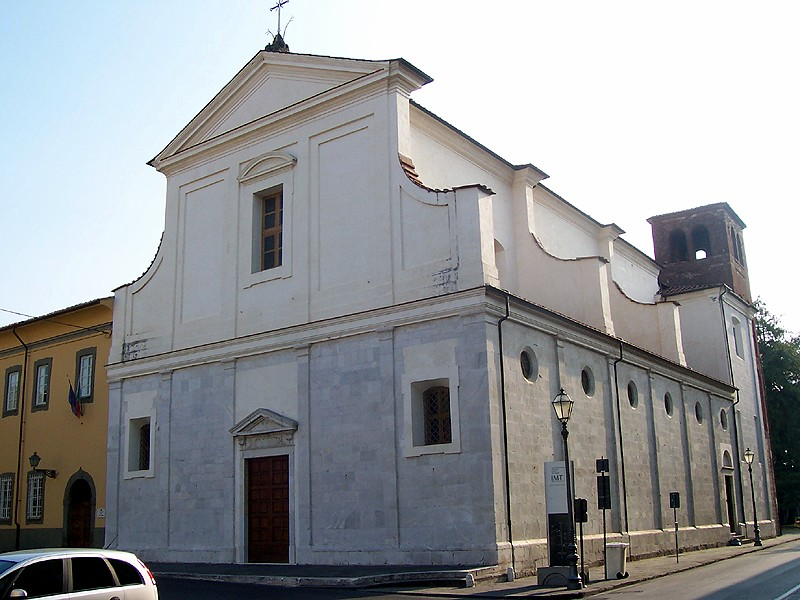
Facade of church

San Ponziano is a Renaissance-style, former Roman Catholic church located on a piazza of the same name in Lucca, region of Tuscany, Italy. It is now the library of the IMT School for Advanced Studies Lucca.

== History ==
A church at the site was present since the 9th century. In 1099 it was occupied by the Benedictine order, which was replaced in the 14th century by the Olivetan order. The church was reconstructed in 1474, when the relics of San Ponziano were transferred there. The facade was refurbished over the next two centuries. The first chapel on the right in the apse has a 12th-century fresco of San Martino.

The sober and white facade dates to before the 17th century. The interior, however, was refurbished in 1720. After being de-consecrated in the 19th century, the church was only reconsecrated in the 1960s before being de-consecrated once more and converted into a university library.

== See also ==
- San Francesco, Lucca
- IMT School for Advanced Studies Lucca
