= Augusto Conti =

Italian philosopher (1822–1905)

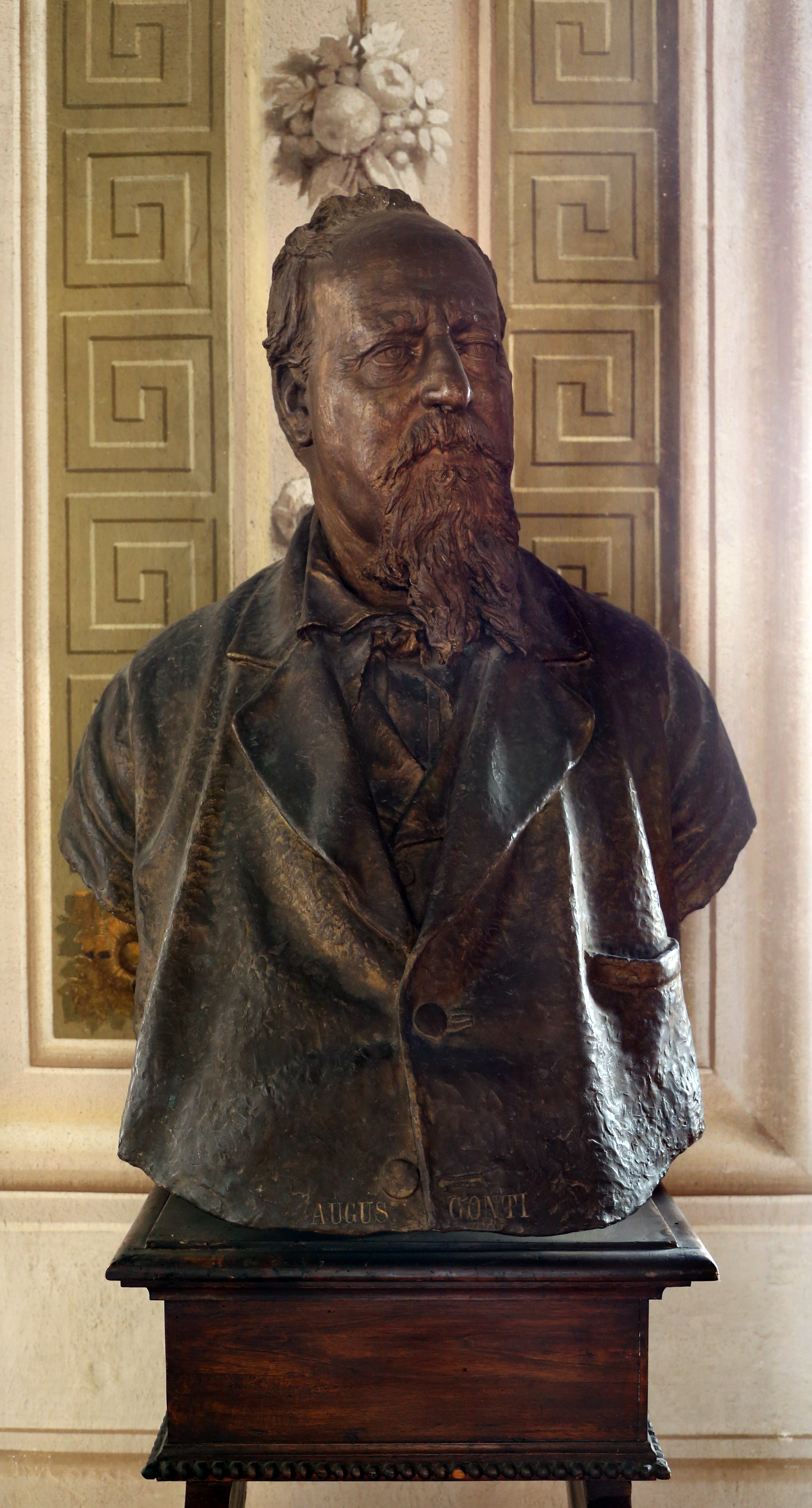
- Bust of Augusto Conti at the headquarters of the Accademia della Crusca
- Born: 6 December 1822; San Miniato, Italy
- Died: 6 March 1905 (aged 82); Florence, Italy

Philosophical work
- Era: 19th-century philosophy
- Region: Western philosophy

Augusto Conti (December 6, 1822 – March 6, 1905) was an Italian philosopher and academic.

== Biography ==
Augusto Conti was born in San Pietro alle Fonti in San Miniato al Tedesco in 1822 to a family from Livorno. His parents were Natale and Anna Passetti.

He studied in Siena and Pisa; at university he assaulted a professor whom he considered reactionary. He was expelled from the university and spent a few months in prison. After that episode he was forced to complete his studies outside the Grand Duchy of Tuscany. He therefore moved to the Duchy of Lucca and graduated in law at the University of Lucca. He was a standard-bearer in Montanara with the Tuscan volunteers during the First Italian War of Independence. He taught in Lucca, Pisa and in the Higher Institute of Florence. Distinguished Christian philosopher, prestigious writer, pedagogist, he collaborated with Raffaello Lambruschini on the periodical La famiglia e la scuola.

On March 31, 1869, for his literary and scientific merits, he was called to sit in the College of Residents of the Accademia della Crusca; later he covered the Archconsulate several times. He was the philosopher of beauty, who defined being between the true and the good, and connected them as the means between the beginning and the end. He had a classical style and his works are sometimes appreciated more for the elegance of the prose than for the content.

In Florence, he was for a long time high councilor of public education and collaborated with the architect Emilio De Fabris for the decoration of the facade of Santa Maria del Fiore using iconographic symbolism to represent the greatness of Christianity and the meaning of the Virgin Mary.

== Works ==
- Cose di storia e d'arte (1874)
- Evidenza, amore e fede (1887)
- I discorsi del tempo in un viaggio in Italia (1867)
- Il bello nel vero
- Il buono nel vero
- Illustrazione delle sculture e dei mosaici sulla facciata del Duomo di Firenze (1887)
- Il vero nell'ordine (1876)
- L'armonia delle cose
- Letteratura e patria, collana di ricordi nazionali
- Nuovi discorsi del tempo
- Religione ed arte
- Storia della filosofia
- Sveglie dell'anima
- Il Messia redentore vaticinato
- La mia corona del rosario
- Ai figli del popolo
- Giovanni Duprè o Dell'arte
- Evidenza, amore e fede o i criteri della filosofia (1858)
- La filosofia di Dante
- La bellezza qual mezzo potente di educazione

== Bibliography ==
- Giovanni Casati, Dizionario degli scrittori d'Italia dalle origini fino ai viventi, Romolo Ghirlanda Editore, Milano, 1926–1934.
- Mario Themelly, «CONTI, Augusto» in Dizionario Biografico degli Italiani, Volume 28, Roma, Istituto dell'Enciclopedia Italiana, 1983.
- Grande Dizionario Enciclopedico UTET (Fedele), Torino, UTET, 1992, volume V, alla voce.
