= Angelo Puccinelli =

Italian painter

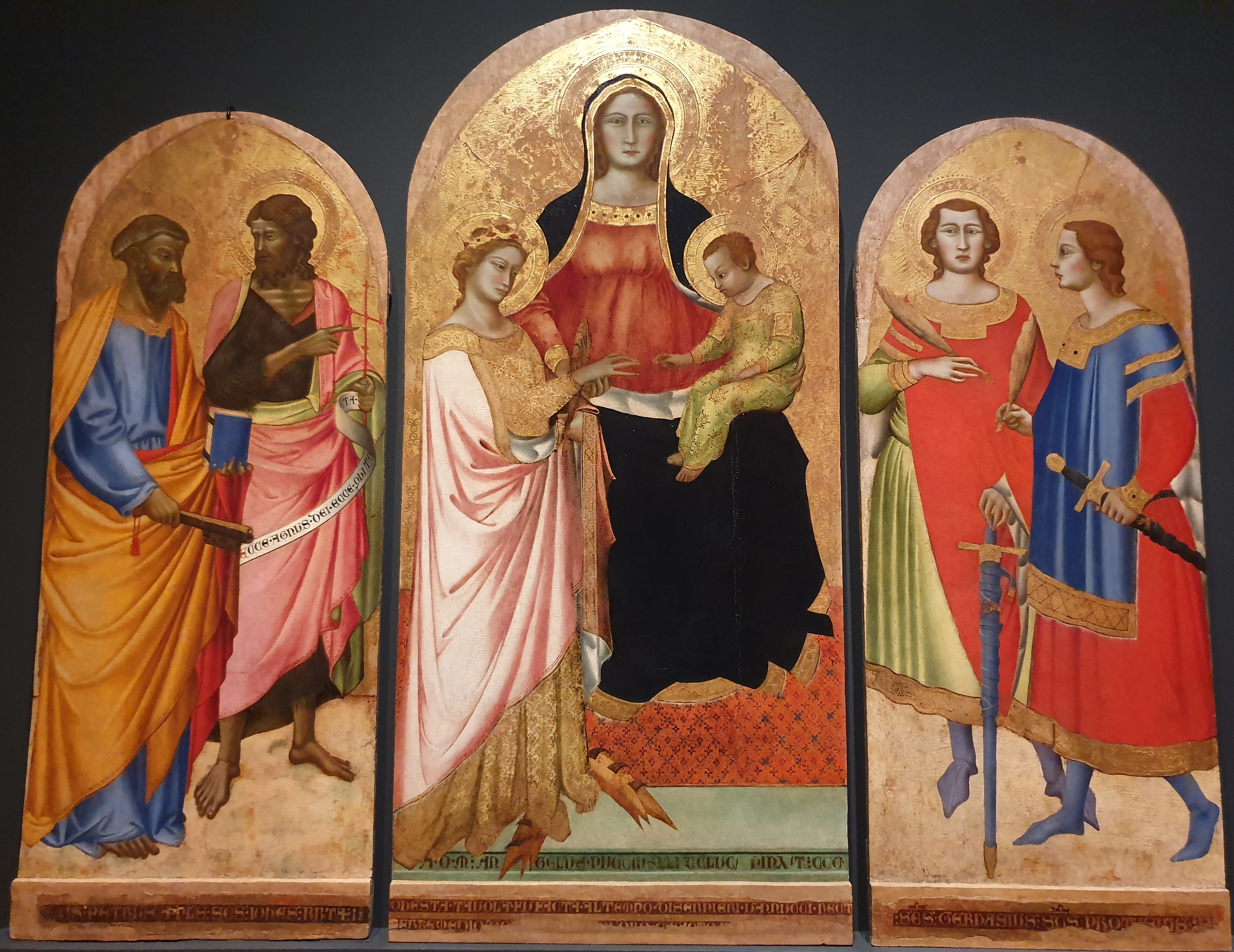
Triptych of the Mystical Marriage of Saint Catherine, tempera and gold on wood, c. 1385 by Angelo Puccinelli

Angelo Puccinelli or Puccinèlli (Lucca, 14th century) was an Italian painter

In 1380, documents show he was in Siena, where he was likely influenced by Lippo Memmi. Among the only signed works are a Marriage of St Catherine, a Madonna and Bambino (1393, found in Museo di Villa Guinigi of Lucca), and the Transit of the Virgin (1386, found in the church of Santa Maria Forisportam), which appear influenced by Spinello Aretino.
