= Oriolo =

Oriolo Greek: Kástro Ourtzoulón
- Comune
- Comune di Oriolo
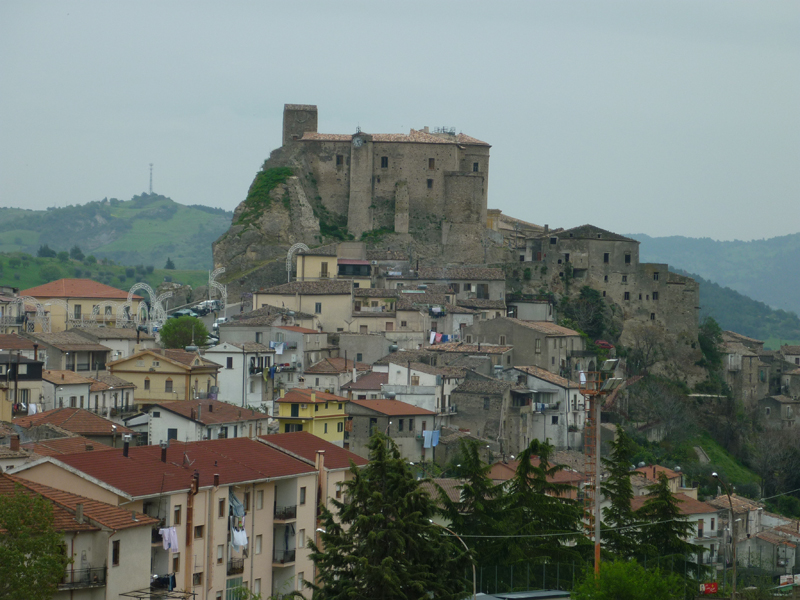

- Location within Italy Location within Calabria
- Coordinates: 40°3′N 16°27′E
- Country: Italy
- Region: Calabria
- Province: Cosenza (CS)

Government
  - Mayor: Simona Colotta

Area
  - Total: 85.6 km^{2} (33.1 sq mi)
- Elevation: 450 m (1,480 ft)

Population (31 August 2017)
  - Total: 2,122
  - Density: 24.8/km^{2} (64.2/sq mi)
- Demonym(s): Oriolani, Oriolesi or Oriesi
- Time zone: UTC+1 (CET)
  - Summer (DST): UTC+2 (CEST)
- Postal code: 87073
- Dialing code: 0981
- ISTAT code: 078087
- Patron saint: Saint George the Martyr
- Saint day: 23 April
- Website: Official website

Oriolo is a town and comune in the province of Cosenza in the Calabria region of southern Italy. It is one of I Borghi più belli d'Italia ("The most beautiful villages of Italy").
