= San Francesco, Lucca =

Church in Lucca, Italy

Coordinates: 43°50′43.51″N 10°30′40.68″E

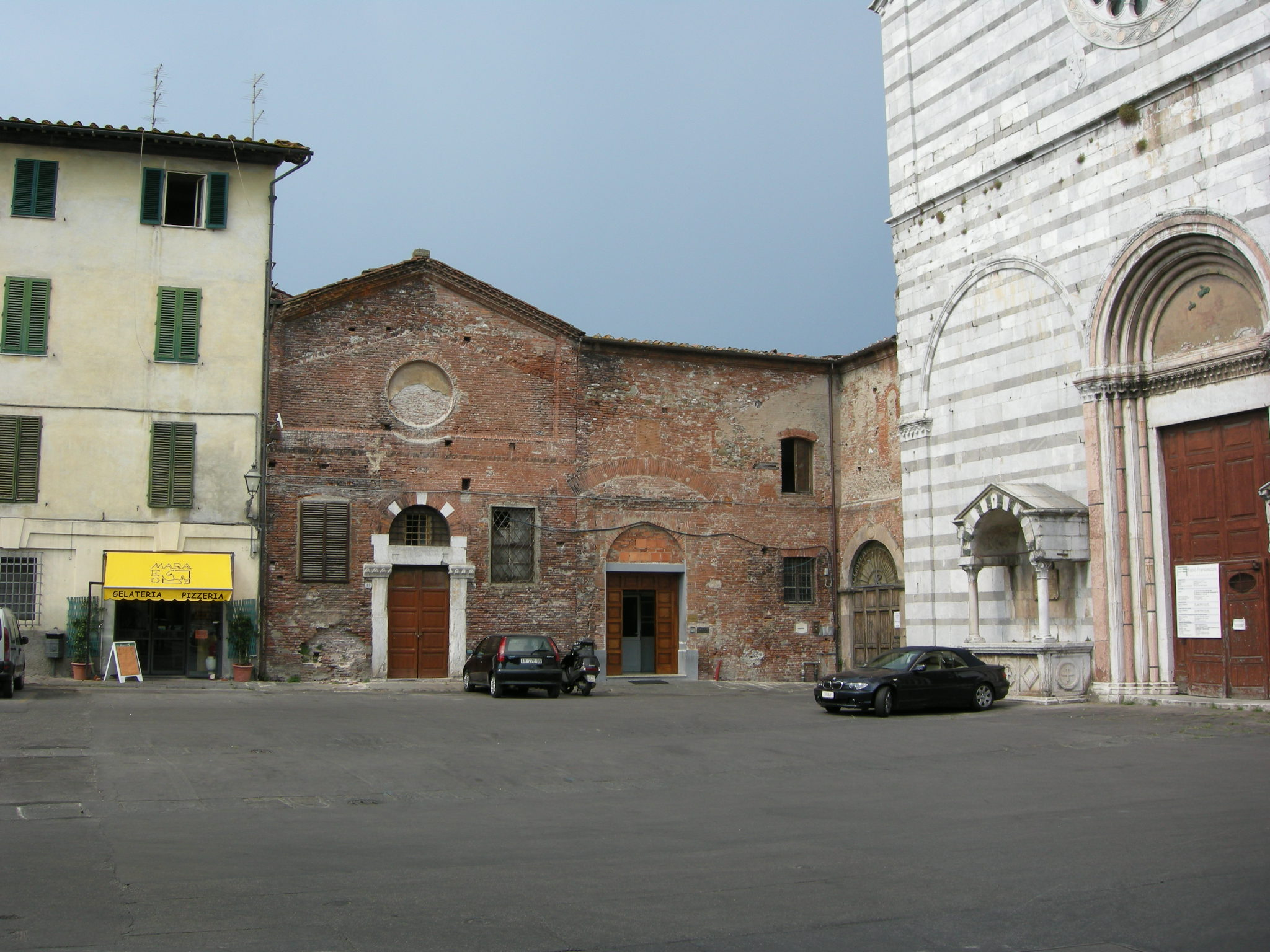
Convent of San Francesco prior to its restoration

San Francesco is a former Gothic-style Roman Catholic church and monastery located in Piazza San Francesco in central Lucca, Tuscany, Italy.

Since its restoration, it has become the home of the IMT School for Advanced Studies Lucca, a superior graduate school.

== History ==
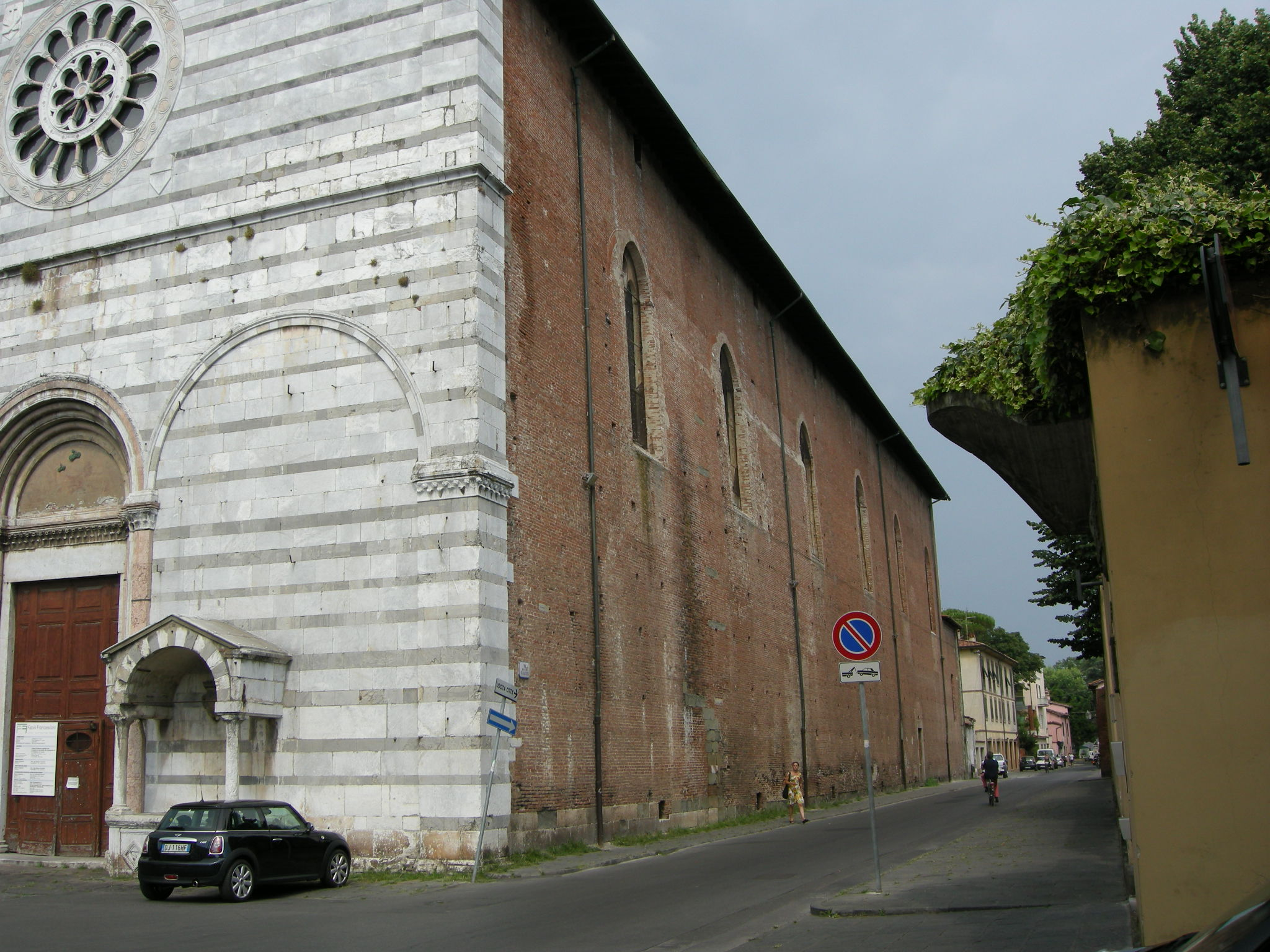
Side view, with part of the façade visible

Members of the Franciscan order were present since 1228, but the church as we see it dates from the 14th century. The church, built out of gravel, has an aisle-less with a trussed roof. It was completed in the early 15th century with the inclusion of three apsidal chapels. The façade, which has two arches either side of the doorway, adopted a coat of white limestone, which remained incomplete, and was completed only in the 20th century. The care taken with the interior design is in parallel with the construction of the complex, which took from the 14th century to the 17th century.

Among the tomb monuments in the interior is the monument to Bishop Giovanni Guidiccioni and a lapidary monument to the Condottiero Castruccio Castracani. To the right of the main altar is the monument to Ugolino Visconti, Governor of Pisa, judge of Gallura in Corsica. He is encountered by his friend Dante Alighieri in Purgatory, awaiting entry to heaven. The church also contains the tombs of Francesco Geminiani and Luigi Boccherini.

Among the paintings is a Noli me Tangere by Domenico Passignano and a Nativity by Federico Zuccari.

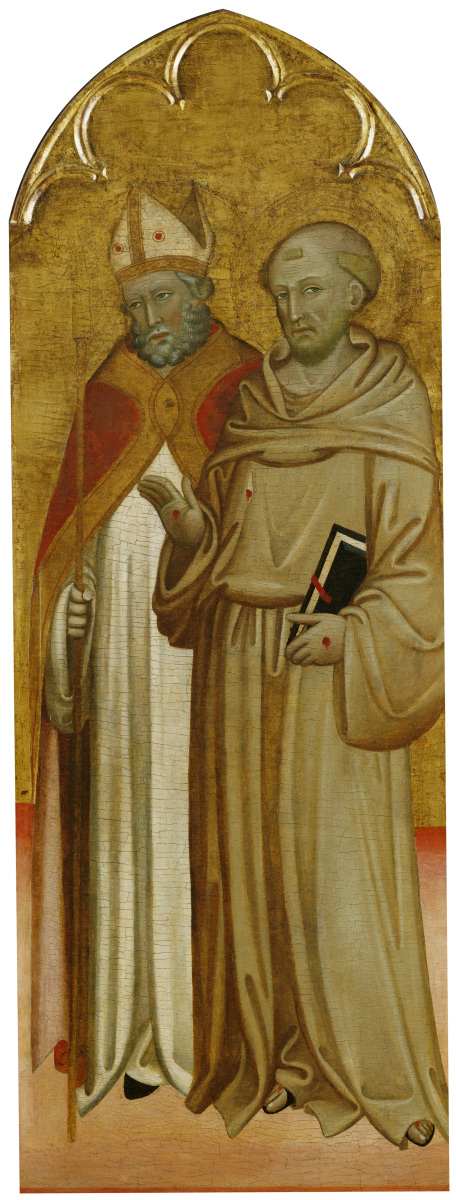
Bishop Saint and Saint Francis of Assisi

The panel of Bishop Saint and Saint Francis of Assisi by Francesco di Andrea Anguilla was part of a triptych commissioned for the convent; it is now in the collection of the Birmingham Museum of Art.
