= Francesco Carrara (jurist) =

Italian jurist and politician (1805–1888)

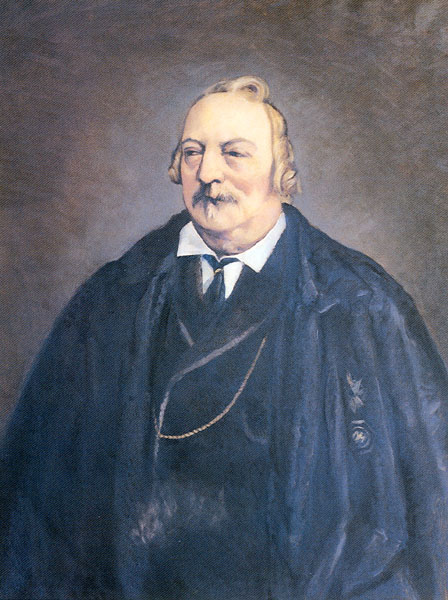
Painting of Francesco Carrara.

Francesco Carrara (September 18, 1805 – January 15, 1888) was an Italian jurist and liberal politician who was one of the leading criminal law European scholars and death penalty abolition lawyers of the 19th century.

== Biography ==
After having received a doctorate at the University of Lucca, Carrara practiced law in Florence and Lucca, where he was soon engaged in debates about criminal law reform. In 1848, he was appointed to the chair of criminal law at the University of Lucca, and in 1859 at Pisa. His principal work, written there, was the ten-volume Programma dal corso di diritto criminale. Synthesising Italian thought in criminal law since Beccaria, it also had significant influence abroad.

As a young politician, Carrara at first followed Mazzini, but came closer to more moderate liberal groups in the 1840s. He helped arrange the accession of Lucca to Tuscany, as he regarded it as a first small step towards national unity. Additionally, he had been disgusted from the five sentences to death by guillotine which Charles II, Duke of Parma had allowed in 1845. Not by chance, just to solemnize the annexation of Lucca, Leopold II, Grand Duke of Tuscany abolished the death penalty in his state, as suggested for by Carrara and by some other jurists.

After Italian unification, Carrara was elected to Parliament in 1863, 1865 and 1867. There, he was an influential member of the commission preparing the Criminal Code of Italy, the "Zanardelli Code" completed in 1889.

Named a senator in 1879, Carrara died at Lucca, where many of his manuscripts remain.
