= Santa Maria Forisportam, Lucca =

Religious building in Lucca, Italy

Coordinates: 43.8421°N 10.5085°E

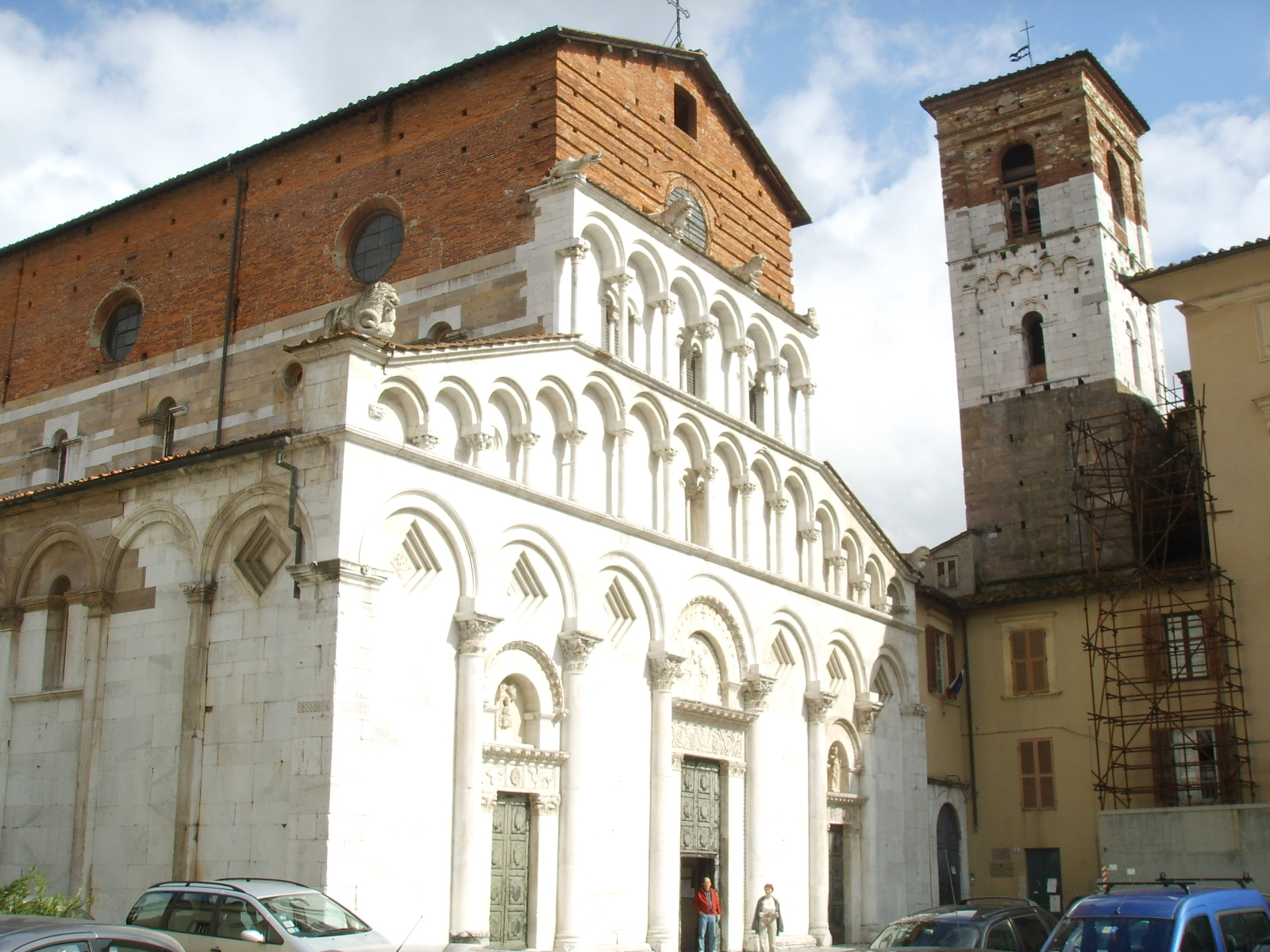
Church of Santa Maria Forisportam

Santa Maria Forisportam, also called Santa Maria Bianca, is a Romanesque-style, Roman Catholic church located on piazza Santa Maria Bianca in Lucca, region of Tuscany, Italy.

== History ==
A church at the site was present by the 12th century, when it was enclosed inside the walls of Lucca. The church is modeled after the Cathedral of Pisa. The exterior remains incomplete, a bell-tower was only added in 1619.

The church was affiliated with the Canonici Regolari of San Salvatore di Bologna in 1512. They remained until the Napoleonic suppression. In 1819 the previous canons returned, and in 1823 the Canons Regular Lateran fused with them into a single order. They continue to be associated with the church. The church has a small monastery and cloister adjacent.

== Interior ==
A sun-clock or meridian a camera oscura is engraved in the pavement of the church. A paleo-Christian carved sarcophagus served as a font. The inside hosts a St Lucy and Assumption canvases by Guercino. A Dormition and Assumption of the Virgin (1386) by Angelo Puccinelli are displayed in the sacristy. It also houses a Coronation of the Virgin (1659) by Girolamo Scaglia and a Trinity with Sts Francis and Jerome by Alessandro Ardenti.
