= University of Lucca =

The University of Lucca was an Italian university located in Lucca (LU), Italy, established in 1785 by the government of the Republic of Lucca. The university disappearing for good in 1867. There had previously been several attempts in the medieval period to found a University of Lucca: On 6 June 1369 Emperor Charles IV granted Lucca a charter for the establishment of a Studium Generale, confirmed on 13 September 1387 by Pope Urban VI. No university was actually founded, but again in 1455 Gonfalonier Giovanni Gigli tried to raise funds for a university, but once more it did not result in an actual institution.

In modern times there are three university colleges in Lucca: The Istituto Musicale (founded in 1843, whose students included Giacomo Puccini), IMT School for Advanced Studies Lucca - a graduate school dedicated to doctoral and post doctoral education and research - and the Campus Studi del Mediterraneo ( offering a Bachelor's degree course in Tourism Science and Master's degree course in Planning and Management of Mediterranean Tourism).
