= San Pietro Martire, Ascoli Piceno =

Roman Catholic church in Ascoli Piceno, Italy

Coordinates: 42°51′26.6″N 13°34′22.7″E

San Pietro Martire is a Gothic-style, Roman Catholic Basilica church located at piazzetta at the intersection of Via delle Torrei, Soderini, and Solestà in the town of Ascoli Piceno in the region of Marche, Italy.

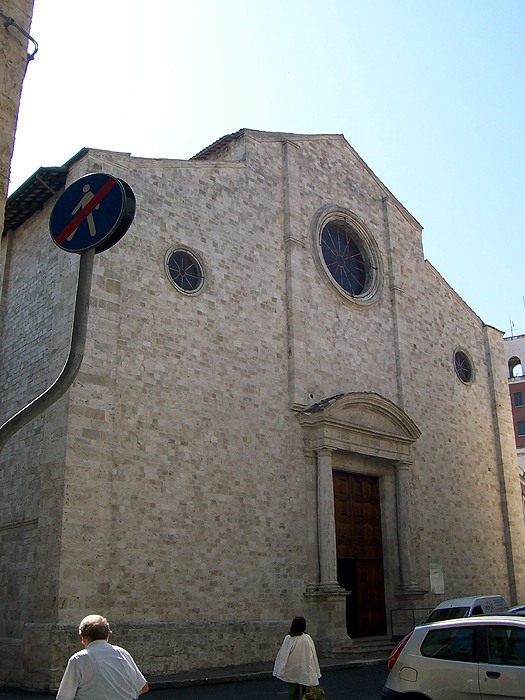
Facade of Church

== History ==
The church was begun by the Dominican order in 1280, recalling the 1250 visit to Ascoli of Brother Pietro da Verona. Construction continued until the 16th century. The travertine block façade has three rounded oculi and a single portal with two flanking columns extending from a rounded pediment. The façade portal was designed by Giuseppe Giosafatti (1643–1731). The lateral portal faces the piazzetta and has doric columns (1523), designed by Cola dell'Amatrice.

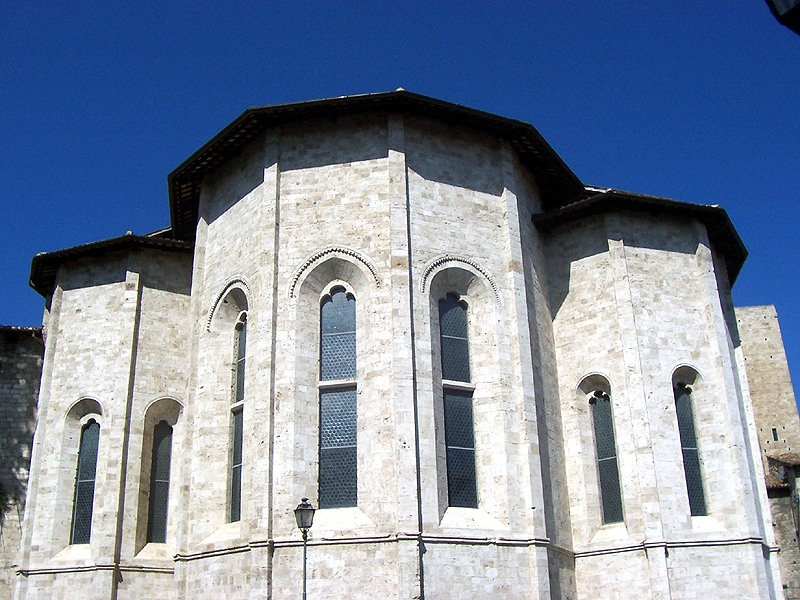
Apse of Church

On the lateral walls is an inscription with the town tax and customs laws. The interior with three naves has a number of travertine altars. The main altar was designed in 1724 by Giuseppe and Lazzaro Giosafatti, it is decorated with a Madonna del Rosario by Luigi Devò flanked by marble statues or the allegories of Purity and Humility. The church also has canvases by Lodovico Trasi, Giuseppe Angelini, Giovanni Battista Buonocore of Campli, and Tommaso Nardini. The lateral walls have 13th and 14th-century frescoes. The relic of the sacred spine is sheltered in a 15th-century gilded silver reliquary made by Nicola da Campli.
