= San Francesco, Ascoli Piceno =

Roman Catholic church in Ascoli Piceno, Italy

Coordinates: 42°51′36″N 13°34′13″E

The Basilica di San Francesco is a Gothic-style, Roman Catholic church located on the Piazza del Popolo in the town of Ascoli Piceno in the region of Marche, Italy.

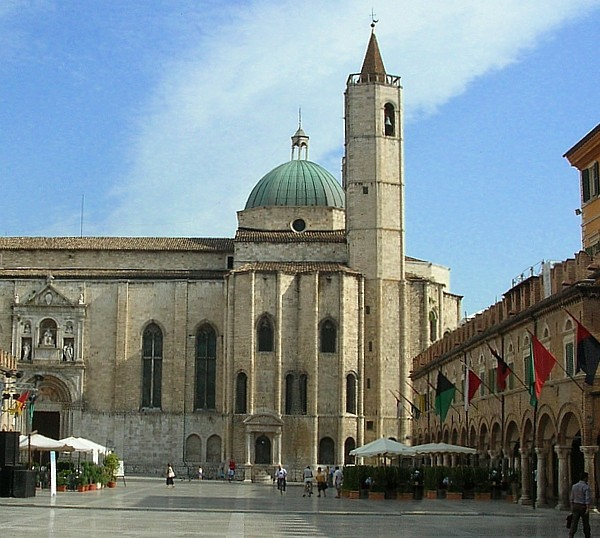
View of church from Piazza del Popolo with cupola, bell tower, monument to Julius II, and Aedicule attributed to Lazzaro Morelli

== History ==
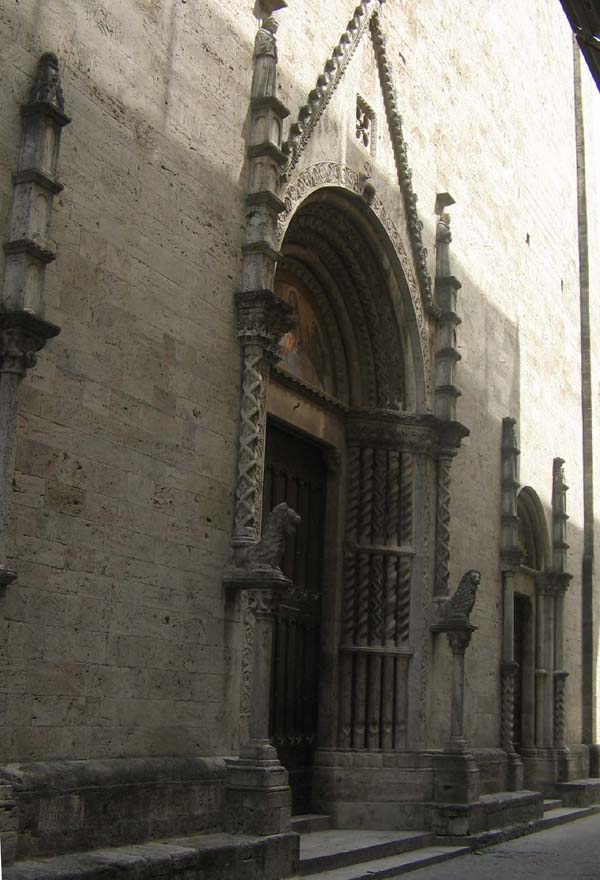
Main facade and portals

Construction of the structure began in 1258, and the church was consecrated in 1371. The church has a Latin cross layout with three naves, divided by hexagonal pilasters. The tall hexagonal bell-tower near the apse was completed in the 15th century, and the copper-sheathed cupola (1548) and ribbed ceilings were not completed until the 16th century. The main facade is in a narrow alley, and has three portals, each with a peaked tympanum and thin elaborate pilasters. The central portal is decorated with highly sculpted travertine marble with a detached column with lions atop capitals, showing persisting Romanesque influences. The top of the tympanum has a sculpture of a lamb, a symbol of the guild of wool merchants, who patronized construction.

The east flank of the church encompasses the five arches of the Loggia dei Mercanti (1513), designed by Bernardino da Carona. The west flank of the church abuts the Chiostro Maggiore.

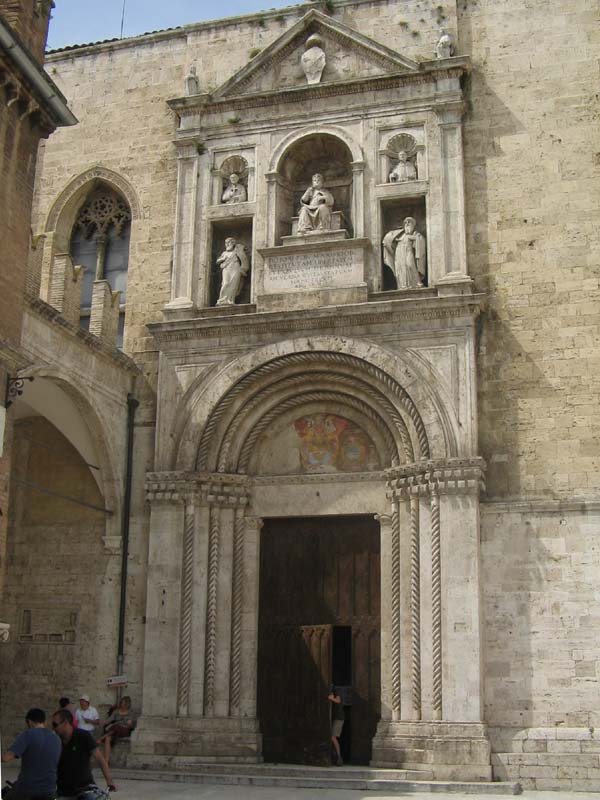
Monument to Julius II

Along the right flank of the church, facing the Piazza del Popolo, is a lateral entrance surmounted by a monument to Pope Julius II (1506–10). The entrance has a rounded arch flanked by receding sets of corded pilasters. The lunette above the door has a fresco. The monument above the pedestal has a statue of the seated pope in the act of blessing, inside a rounded niche, flanked by statues of holy figures each in their niche. The plaque below translates to: Julius II Pontifex Maximus, restored liberty and expelled the Tyrants. The people of Ascoli erected statues in the year of our savior 1510 This monument honors the pope for imprisoning the Ghibelline tyrant, Astolto Guiderocchi, who had taken control of the city in 1504.

A few meters to the north of the portal of Julius, on the outer wall of the right transept, is an aedicule built against the church. It consists of a portal like structure with an iron grill protecting a venerated image of the Madonna adoring her Son. A protruding rounded tympanum with an angel and a garland are sustained by two Corinthian columns. The aedicule has three rounded steps in front. Tradition attributes the design (1639) to Lazzaro Morelli, a pupil of Bernini, but others attribute it to Silvio Giosafatti.

The 17th-century travertine pulpit was completed by Antonio Giosafatti. The presbytery has three apses. The ogival windows frame stained glass windows. The sacristy contains and altarpiece depicting the Jesus and the Apostles by Cola dell'Amatrice. It also contains paintings by Biagio Miniera, and Nicola Monti (depicting the Blessed Beato Corrado). The adjacent building, the former Franciscan monastery has two cloisters. The larger cloister, Chiostro Maggiore also called the Piazza della Verdura houses a daily food market.
