= Giovanni Battista Crema =

Italian painter (1883–1964)

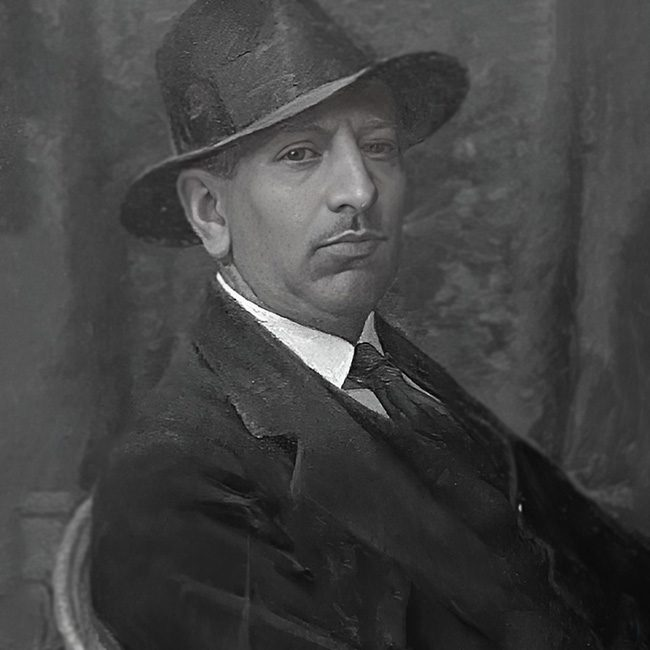
Giovanni Battista Crema

Giovanni Battista Crema (1883–1964) was an Italian painter.

== Biography ==
Crema was born in Ferrara in 1883. In 1889 he moved to Naples to study under Michele Cammarano and Domenico Morelli at the Academy of Fine Arts of Naples. He then moved to Bologna to finish his studies. From 1903 to 1964 he lived in Rome.

He mainly painted social subjects with symbolist style. He was influenced by Gaetano Previati.

His work is included in the collection of the Minneapolis Institute of Art, the Museo Revoltella in Trieste, Italy, the Ascoli Piceno Museum at Palazzo dell'Arengo, Ascoli Piceno, Marche, and the Fondazione Cassa di Risparmio di Tortona in Tortona, Italy.
