= Giuseppe Angelini (painter) =

Italian painter (1670s–1751)

Giuseppe Angelini (c. 1675 – November 20, 1751), known as la Regina ("the Queen"), was an Italian painter.

Born in Ascoli Piceno, Papal States, he first trained locally under Ludovico Trasi and then moved to work under Giuseppe Giosafatti and later Carlo Palucci. He gained his nickname when he served as an actor dressed as Queen Dido. He painted flowers, ornaments, and landscapes. He died of a stroke in Ascoli, and was buried in the parish church of San Martino.
