= Luca Vitelli =

Italian painter

Luca Vitelli (died 1730) was an Italian painter of the Baroque period, born and active in Rome and Ascoli Piceno both in the Papal States.

== Biography ==
He was born in Ascoli, and there was a pupil of Ludovico Trasi in Ascoli. He is said to have traveled to Rome, where he was employed in painting ceilings in private homes. He was facile in both tempera and oil. He worked alongside his fellow-pupil of Trasi, Tommaso Nardini. He painted the ceiling of the church of the Annunziata, and a canvas depicting the Martyrdom of Saints Crispin and Crispiniano for the church of Sant'Agostino, both in Ascoli. He also painted lunettes with the Story of Santa Caterina da Siena for the church of San Venanzio. He painted an Establishment of the Eucharist with the Virgin and Saints (1708) for the Confraternity of Corpus Domini in Ascoli.
