= San Tommaso, Ascoli Piceno =

Roman Catholic church in Marche, Italy

Coordinates: 42°51′20.6″N 13°34′15.7″E

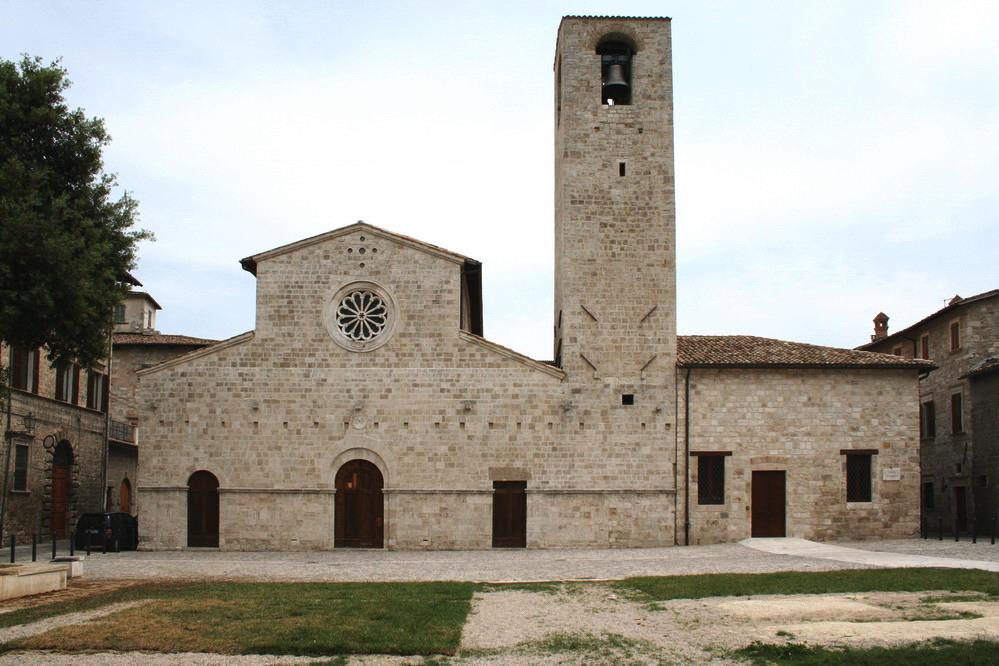
Church of San Tommaso Apostolo of Ascoli Piceno.

San Tommaso Apostolo is a Romanesque and Gothic-style, Roman Catholic church located in the town of Ascoli Piceno in the region of Marche, Italy.

== History ==
Construction of the church was spurred circa 1064 by Bishop Bernardo II. The simple façade built with travertine blocks has three naves, with a tympanum with a rose window. To the right, rises a bell-tower (1283) with a square base. The church has a basilica layout with the naves and aisles separated by sturdy pilasters, and includes spolia from the former Roman amphitheater of the first century BC, which had been located in the piazza in front of the church.

Many of the nave pilasters are frescoed. Frescoes depict a Madonna del Latte (14th century) by the Maestro di Offida and an Enthroned Madonna and Child (1298). A number of the lateral altars were erected in the 18th century using travertine marble. The main altar has a gilded wood tabernacle from the 16th century shaped like an octagonal ciborium. The church houses a marble sculptural group (17th-century) depicting a Madonna and Child with St Thomas the Apostle and St John the Evangelist sculpted by Lazzaro and Giuseppe Giosafatti.
