= Giuseppe Angelini =

Giuseppe Angelini may refer to:

- Giuseppe Angelini (bishop) (1810–1876), Italian Roman Catholic bishop
- Giuseppe Angelini (painter) (c. 1675–1751), Italian painter
- Giuseppe Angelini (sculptor) (1735–1811), Italian sculptor
