= San Cristoforo, Ascoli Piceno =

Roman Catholic church in Ascoli Piceno, Italy

Coordinates: 43.4946°N 12.8430°E

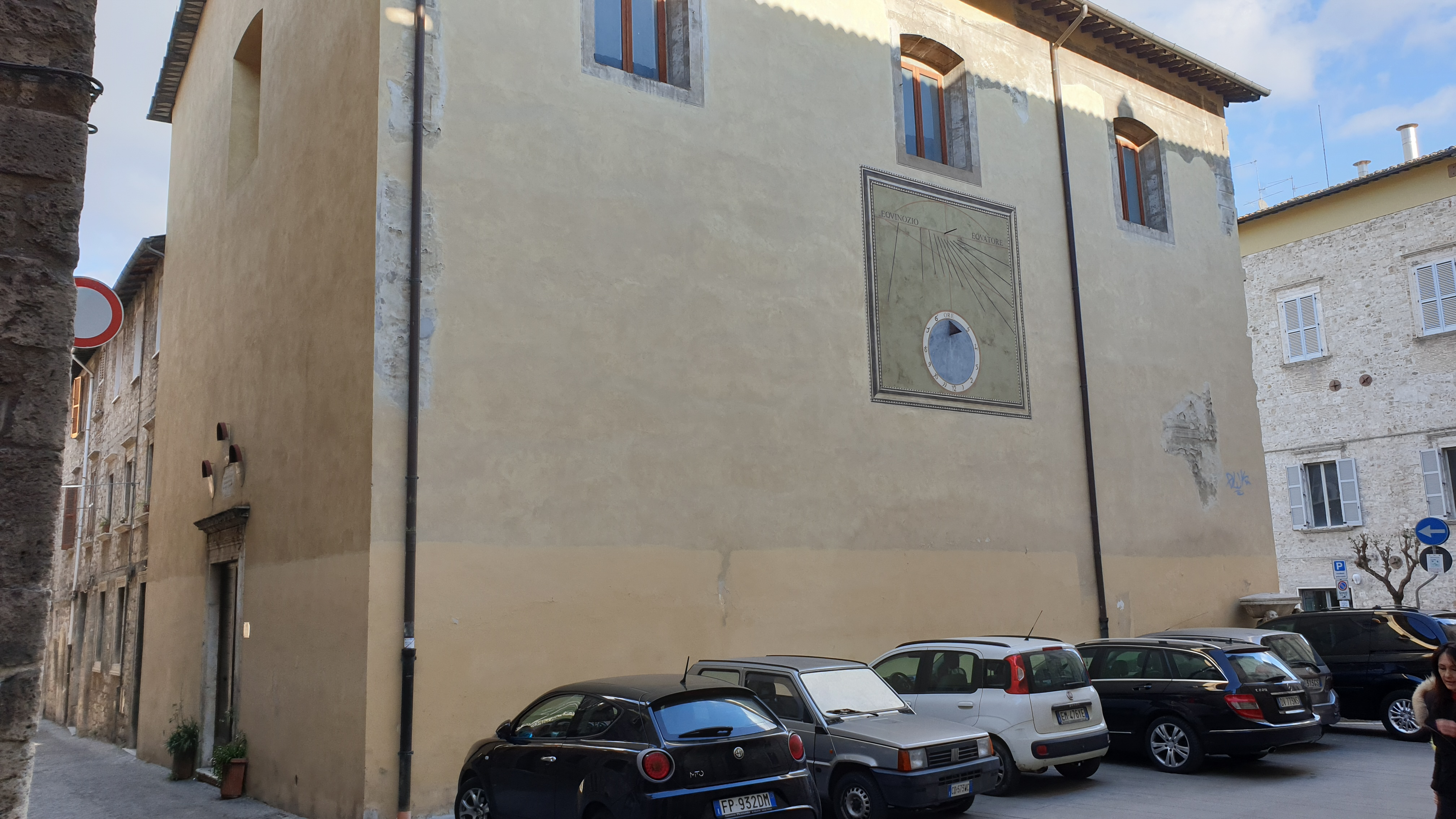
Ascoli Piceno: Church of San Cristoforo

San Cristoforo is a Baroque-style Roman Catholic church located on Rua d'Argillano in the town of Ascoli Piceno in the region of Marche, Italy.

== History ==
The church was begun as the oratory for the Confraternita della Buona Morte (Confraternity of the Good Death). A group often tending to those condemned to execution. It was reconstructed in 1593–98, at the site of a 14th-century church. The façade dates to 1603, but the church was not completed until 1790. The interior has three stucco altars by local architect Giuseppe Giosafatti. The church houses altarpieces by Ludovico Trasi, depicting the Miracle of San Nicola di Bari, and by Nicola Antonio Monti, depicting the Souls in Purgatory.
