= Agostino Collaceroni =

Italian painter

Agostino Collaceroni (17th century) was an Italian painter, mainly active in his native Bologna as a painter of quadratura. He trained under Andrea Pozzo. For the church of Sant'Angelo Magno of Ascoli Piceno, he painted quadratura for which Tommaso Nardini painted the figures.

== Sources ==
- Boni, Filippo de' (1852). Biografia degli artisti ovvero dizionario della vita e delle opere dei pittori, degli scultori, degli intagliatori, dei tipografi e dei musici di ogni nazione che fiorirono da'tempi più remoti sino á nostri giorni. Seconda Edizione. Venice; Googlebooks: Presso Andrea Santini e Figlio. p. 236.
