= Pier-Sante Cicala =

Italian painter

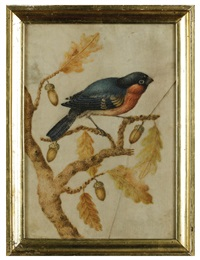
Pier-Sante Cicala

Pier-Sante Cicala (14 February 1664–29 December 1727) was an Italian painter of the Baroque period, born and active in Ascoli Piceno, Papal States. After dallying with priesthood, he became a painter, manuscript illuminator, and architect. He trained in the former with Ludovico Trasi. He learned military architectural designs from Captain Celso Saccoccia. He painted both sacred subjects and still lifes.
