= Asculum =

Asculum, also known as Ausculum, was the ancient name of two Italian cities:

- Ascoli Piceno, in ancient Picenum (modern Marche)
- Ascoli Satriano, in Apulia, South East Italy

== See also ==
- Battle of Asculum (disambiguation)
