= Palazzo dell'Arengo =

Coordinates: 42°51′12″N 13°34′37″E

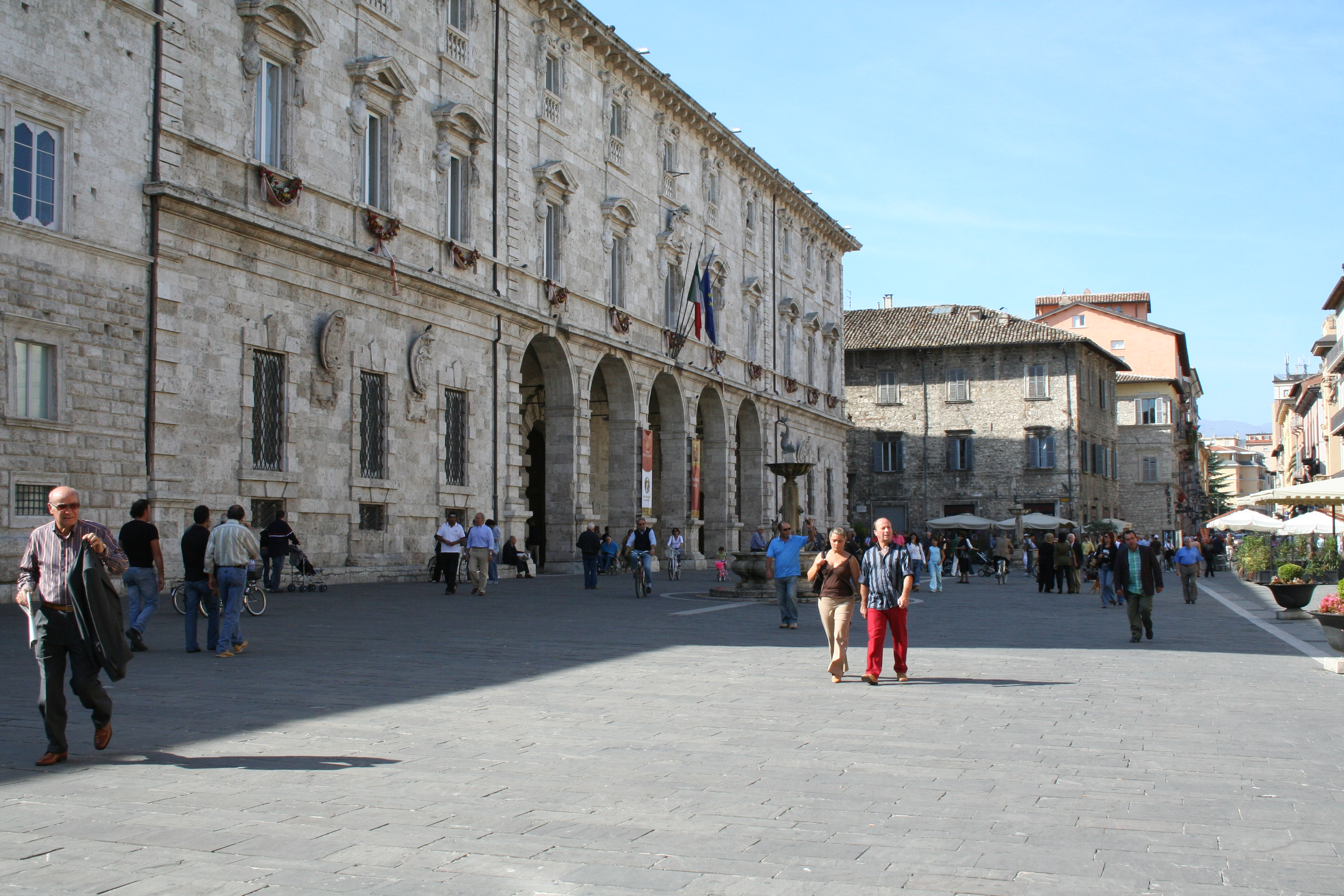
Palazzo dell'Arengo.

Palazzo dell'Arengo is a monumental palace located on Piazza Arringo, also called Piazza dell'Arengo (Square of the People's Assembly), in the town-center of Ascoli Piceno, Marche, central Italy. The facades of the Duomo of Ascoli Piceno, the Baptistry of San Giovanni Battista, and the Episcopal palace also face the square, which is now decorated with two oval fountains.

== History ==
The structure is formed by the fusion of two distinct buildings, the Palazzo del Comune with its ground floor arched portico built during the 12th to 14th centuries, and the Arringo built in the late 12th century. During the 15th century, both palaces were acquired by the Apostolic Camera, which converted this to the seat of the papal governor of the city, a function it served until 1564. In 1610 Giambattista Cavagna, architect of the Sanctuary of Loreto, refitted the buildings with a common façade, although the works started only in 1695 under a renewed design by Giuseppe Giosafatti, and was complete only in 1745.

The palace's façade was erected with travertine blocks, with a five-arcaded portico in the center supported by rusticated pilasters. The upper stories have idiosyncratic window frames. The first floor has alternating rounded and triangular window pediments supported by female caryatids, while the upper floor has male atlases supporting ionic capital volutes. The lower portal gives access to the 13th century main hall: this is a three-nave room with eight bays covered by cross-vaults, supported by cylindrical columns. It was known as fondachi, and was used by the Ascoli citizens as judiciary hall, market and storage hall.

The section of the former Palazzo Arringo contains the Pinacoteca Civica (Municipal Art Gallery). This portion of the building was refurbished in the 17th and 18th centuries. The gallery was instituted in 1861 after the suppression of the religious orders led to the central concentration of many works of art. The palace of the commune currently houses the mayor's office.

== See also ==
- Museo delle Arti Monastiche
