= Buratti =

Buratti is an Italian surname. Notable people with the surname include:

- Bonnie Buratti, American astronomer
- Domenico Buratti (1881–1960), Italian painter, poet and illustrator
- Franciscus Buratti (1582-?), Bishop of Vulturara e Montecorvino
- Girolamo Buratti (active 1580), Italian Renaissance painter
- Robert Buratti, Australian painter, author
