= Carlo Palucci =

Italian painter

Carlo Polucci or Palucci (1650 - January 18, 1743) was an Italian painter, active in a Baroque style.

== Biography ==
He was born to an aristocratic family in Ascoli Piceno, but desired to become a painter and that led him to training under Ludovico Trasi, and after the former's passing, to work with Giuseppe Giosafatti. He is better known for his pupils in Ascoli, than for his works. He is buried in Sant'Agostino in Ascoli.
