= Biagio Miniera =

Italian painter (1697–1755)

Biagio Miniera (1697 - August 28, 1755) was an Italian painter, active in a Rococo style.

== Biography ==
Miniera was born in Ascoli Piceno. He first trained locally under Carlo Palucci, then traveled to Rome to study under Pietro Subleyras and in the French Academy in Rome. He was influenced by Giulio Solimena, brother of the more famous Francesco. He is said to have painted colorful capricci in tempera. Returning to Ascoli, he painted the sipario for the new theater in the Palazzo Anzianale. He opened a studio-school with various apprentices. He was buried in Ascoli in the Church of Santa Maria delle Grazie.

Niccola Monti was one of his pupils.
