= Master of Offida =

Italian painter

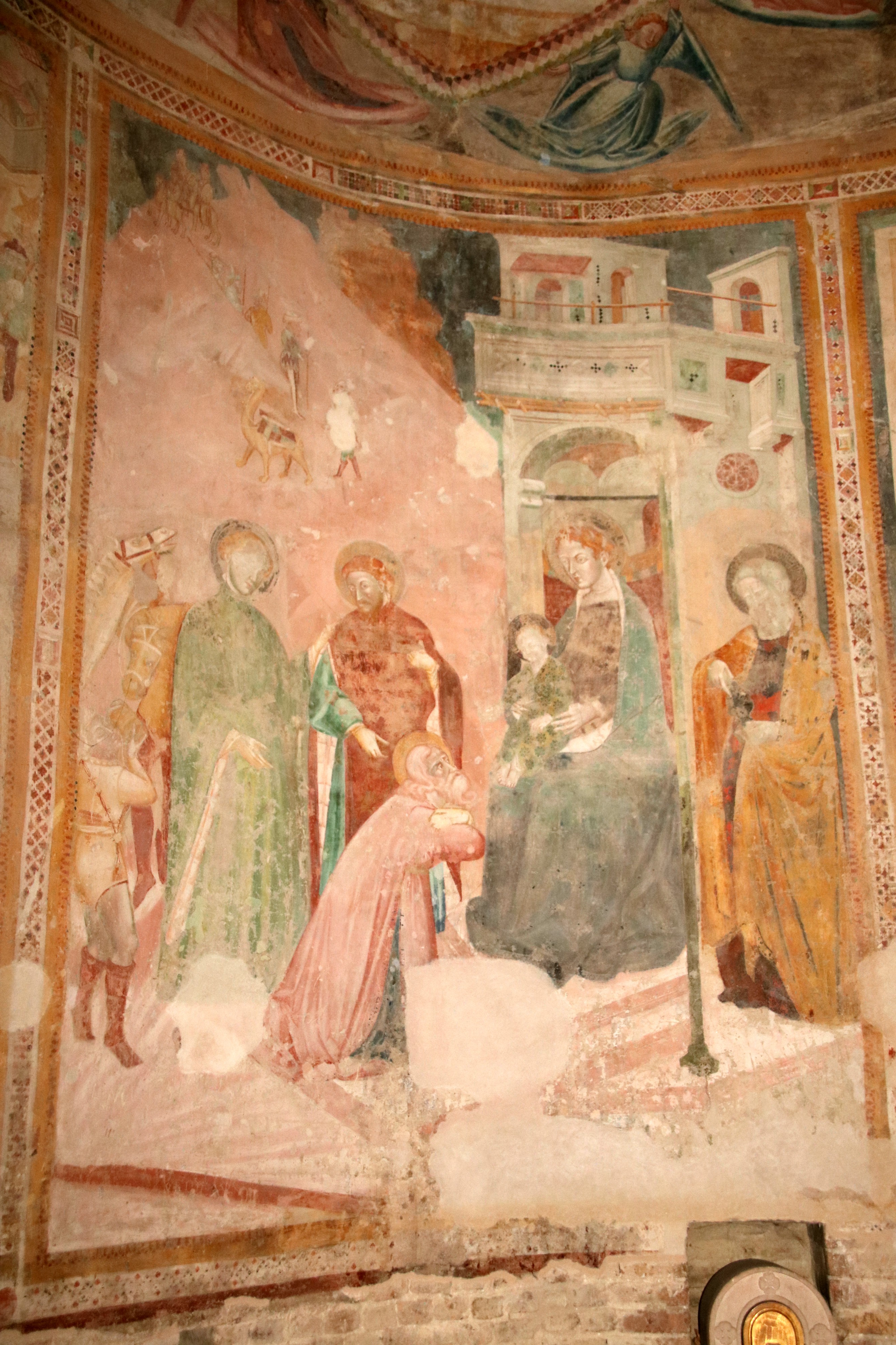

The Master of Offida (active mid to late 14th century) was an anonymous painter active in the towns of Offida and Ascoli Piceno in the Marche.

He painted frescoes in the church and crypt of Santa Maria della Rocca in Offida during the period circa 1360 to 1370, depicting prophets and saints including a Santa Caterina di Alessandria, but also an "Annunciation, a "Madonna del Latte.

Frescoes in the church of San Vittore in Ascoli Piceno, are attributed to this painter. A folding tablet of tempera on gilded wood at the Fogg Art Museum depicting The Virgin and Child Enthroned and Christ on the Cross between the Virgin and Saint John the Evangelist has been attributed to the painter.
