= Ascolano (olive) =

Olive cultivar

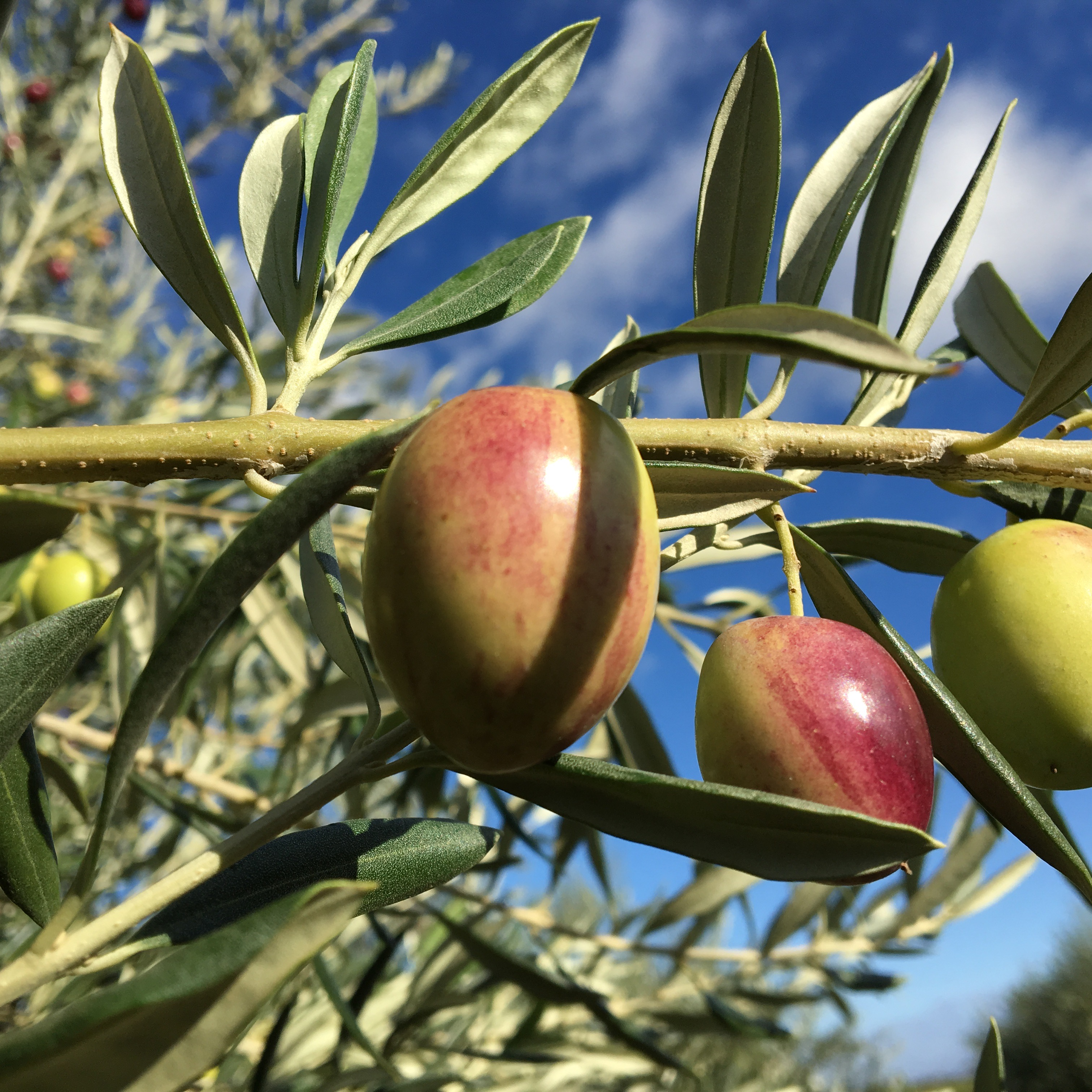
- Ascolano olives

Olive (Olea europaea)
- Origin: Italy, California
- Notable regions: Marche, Tuscany
- Hazards: Verticillium dahliae, Spilocaea oleaginea (peacock or Pan Eye Disease), concerns over spreading X. f. pauca
- Use: Table
- Oil content: Low
- Growth form: Spreading
- Leaf: Elliptic
- Weight: Large
- Shape: Ovoid
- Symmetry: Asymmetrical

Ascolano is a cold-hardy table variety olive cultivar from the Marche and Tuscany regions of Italy that is also grown in California for olive oil.

== Characteristics ==
Harvesting and milling when overripe results in the olive oil exhibiting a fruity character of tropical fruit and peaches. The variety needs cross-pollination with varieties like Leccino or Pendolino.

The leaves of the Ascolano are broad, elliptic-lanceolate shaped, and of medium length. The fruit is elliptically shaped, long, rounded at the apex, and with a truncated base.

== Concerns ==
Although resistant to cold, "Peacock Spot" (fungus Spilocaea oleaginea) and "Olive Knot" (bacteria Pseudomonas savastonoi), preventative measures are used with fixed Copper fungicides such as copper hydroxide, tribasic copper chloride, copper sulfate, or copper oxide.

The bacterial pathogen, Xylella fastidiosa pauca (X. f. pauca), that causes "Olive Quick Decline Syndrome" (OQDS) and mainly affects the Apulia region has infected 200,000 hectares (490,000 acres) in Italy and is feared to be spreading, despite containment measures. The disease has been found in the regions of Apulia, Calabria, Basilicata, Sicily, Sardinia, coastal areas of Campania, Lazio, and in the south of Tuscany.

== See also ==
- List of olive cultivars
- Olive all'ascolana
