= Ascoli Satriano =

Ascoli Satriano Àsculë (Neapolitan)
- Comune
- Comune di Ascoli Satriano
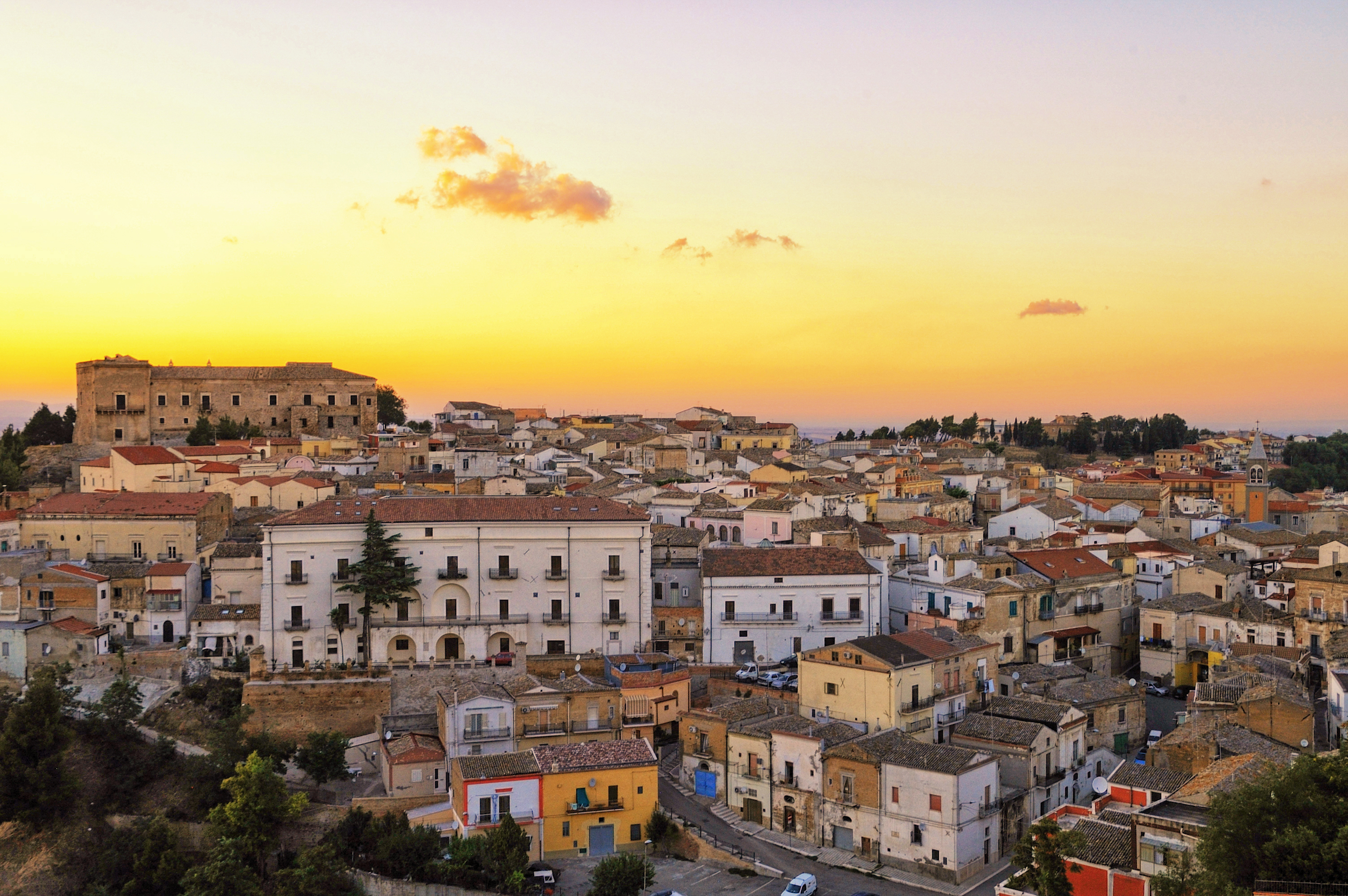
- View of Ascoli Satriano

- Coat of arms

- Location of Ascoli Satriano in Italy Ascoli Satriano (Apulia)
- Coordinates: 41°12′56″N 15°33′28″E
- Country: Italy
- Region: Apulia
- Province: Foggia (FG)
- Frazioni: San Carlo

Government
  - Mayor: Vincenzo Sarcone

Area
  - Total: 337.18 km^{2} (130.19 sq mi)
- Elevation: 393 m (1,289 ft)

Population (1-1-2025)
  - Total: 5,680
  - Density: 16.8/km^{2} (43.6/sq mi)
- Demonym: Ascolano(i)
- Time zone: UTC+1 (CET)
  - Summer (DST): UTC+2 (CEST)
- Postal code: 71022
- Dialing code: 0885
- Patron saint: San Potito Martire
- Saint day: January 14
- Website: Official website

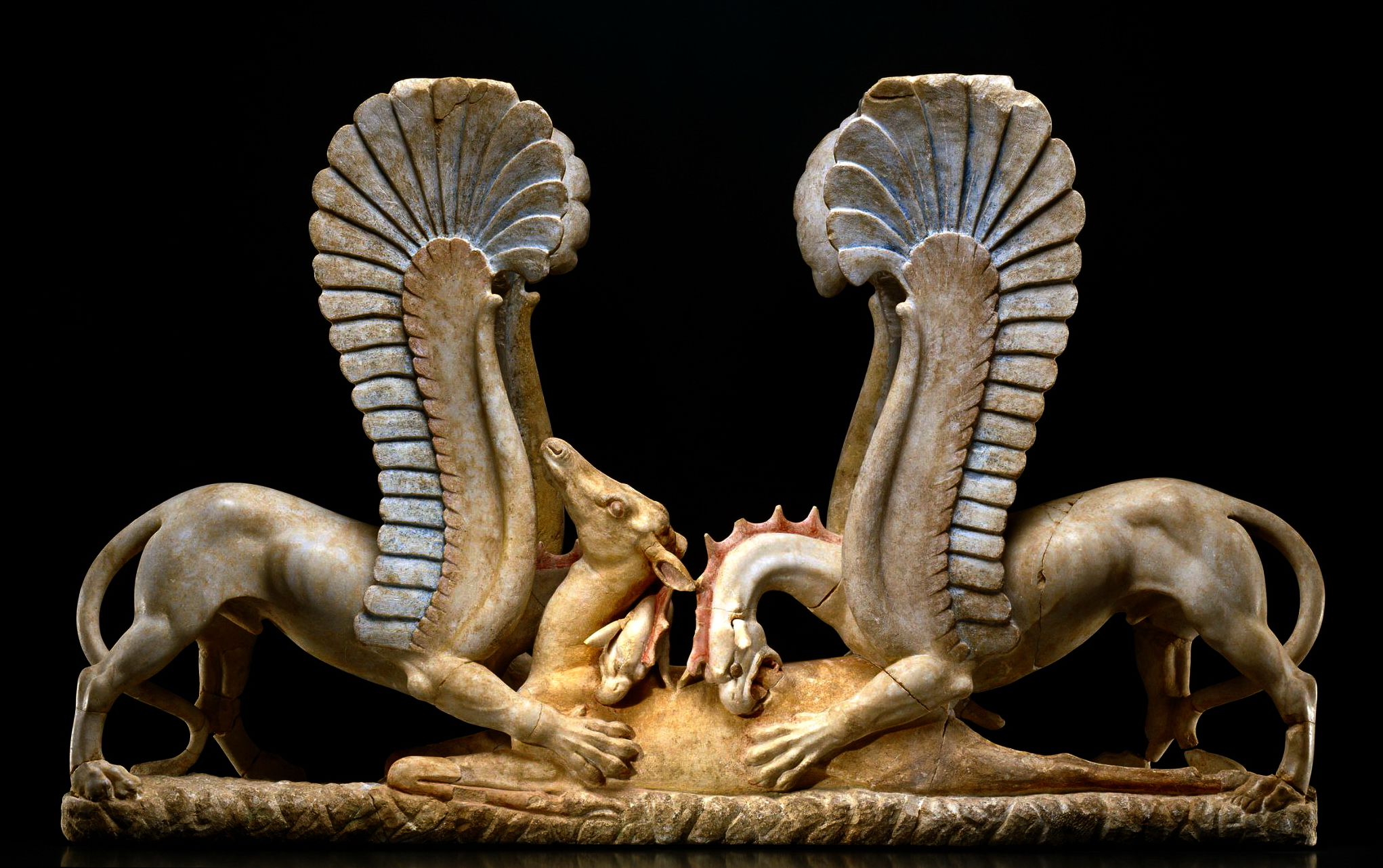
Polychrome marble carving (4th century BC) of two griffins devouring a deer. Formerly at the Getty Museum, now at The Museum Center of Ascoli Satriano.

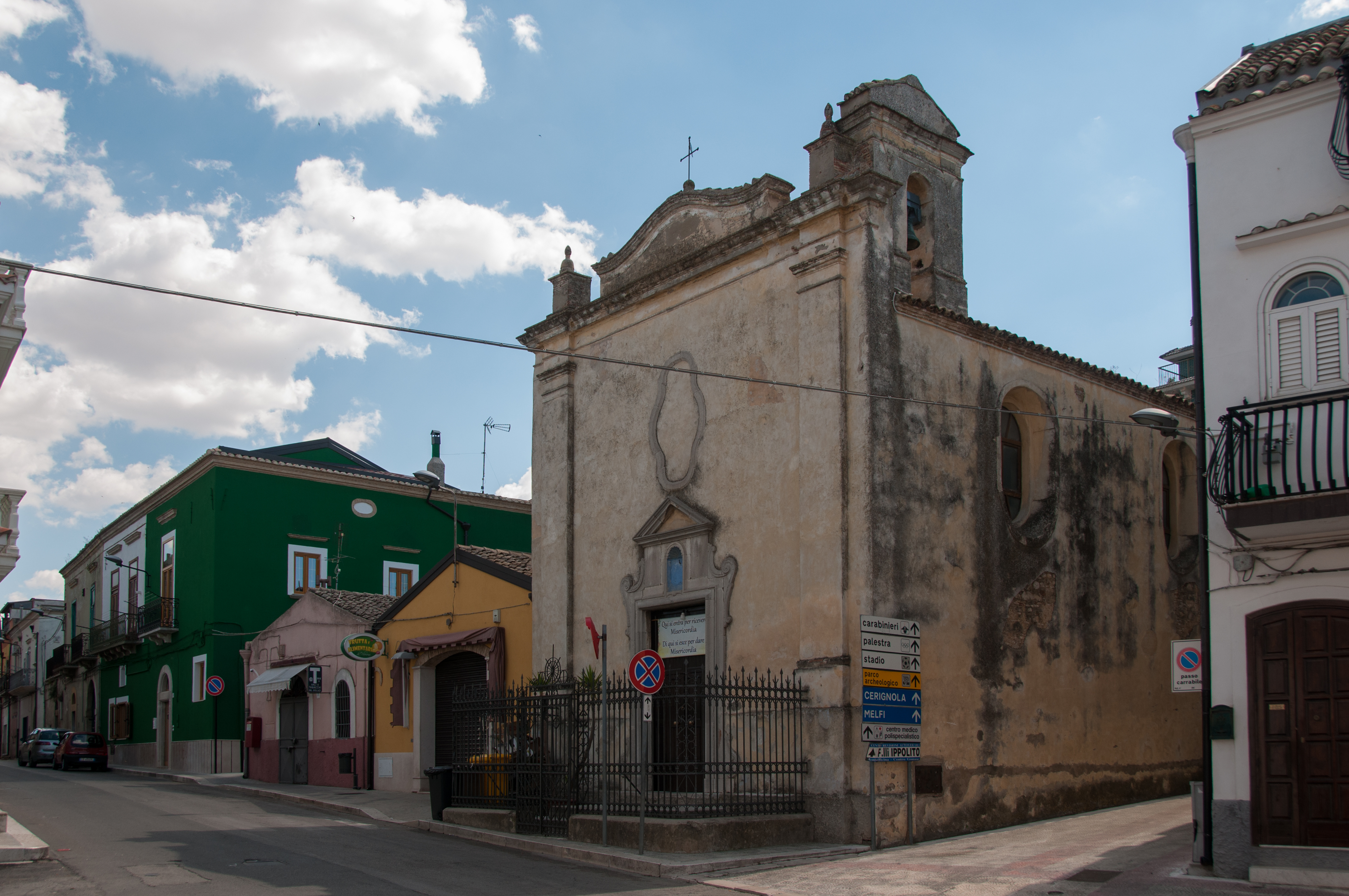
Church of San Rocco.

Ascoli Satriano (Italian: [ˈaskoli satriˈaːno]; Foggiano: Àsculë) is a town and comune in the province of Foggia in the Apulia region of southeast Italy. It is located on the edge of a large plain in Northern Apulia known as the Tavoliere delle Puglie.

== History ==
The earliest human presence in the area of Ascoli Satriano dates from around the 9th century BC, according to archaeological evidence, and similar dated earthworks are common in the area. It was a small village eventually on a branch of the Appian Way in Apulia, South East Italy.

Asculum was a town of the Dauni, a warlike tribe. Two battles were fought there. Asculum gave effective help to the Romans at the first Battle of Asculum in 279 BC, which was the first of King Pyrrhus of Epirus's Pyrrhic victory against the Roman Republic during the Pyrrhic War. This was followed by the Battle of Asculum (209 BC), during the Second Punic War, in which Hannibal defeated a Roman army commanded by Marcus Claudius Marcellus in an indecisive battle. Asculum was also the name of other places.

The Battle of Canusium also took place nearby. In the Social War the city took the Italian side against Rome, and the end of that war, at the Battle of Asculum (89 BC), the victorious Romans besieged the town, starved it to surrender, executed the adult male prisoners by flogging and decapitation, and burned the town. Those noncombatants who survived were left to wander without support. The Roman general responsible, Gnaeus Pompeius Strabo, gained the nickname Carnifex ("Butcher"). Later Sulla established a military colony there.

In the Roman period it became a small cluster of habitations in a wider network of scattered villas. Under the Roman Empire the economy was operated by slave labour and focused on grain cultivation. The large luxurious villa at Faragola was typical of a latifundium.

As the Western Roman Empire began to collapse in the fourth and fifth centuries, many of the surrounding farms were abandoned with a retraction of cultivation and a re-growth of woodlands. In the mid-9th century the Saracens razed the city. In 1040 it rebelled against the Byzantines and, the following year, a decisive battle was fought nearby which granted the Normans control over southern Italy. An earthquake in 1456 totally destroyed Ascoli Satriano, and forced relocation of the surviving inhabitants to the site of the current town. Re-growth of the town however was interrupted by periodic outbreaks of plague and typhus into the early 19th Century.

From the end of the nineteenth century the Ascoli Satriano was affected by increasing emigration to the Americas, reaching a peak between 1903 and 1914, stopping during the periods of the First World War and Italian fascism. After the bombing of Foggia in 1943, Ascoli Satriano was freed by British and American forces.

After the Second World War, Ascoli Satriano, close to Cerignola, was the center of significant labor struggles against landlordism, sharecropping and low wages, and strikes, demonstrations and land occupations became frequent.

== Notable people ==
- Biagio Ciotto, American politician.
- Michele Placido, actor and film director
