= Domenico Balestrieri =

Italian painter

Domenico Balestrieri was an Italian painter from Ascoli Piceno. He was active in the 1460s in Urbino, where he painted in the church of San Rocco. He is not to be confused with the seventeenth-century poet, writer, and philosopher from Milan.
