= Santa Maria Inter Vineas, Ascoli Piceno =

Roman Catholic church in Ascoli Piceno, Italy

Coordinates: 42°51′24.9″N 13°34′34.3″E

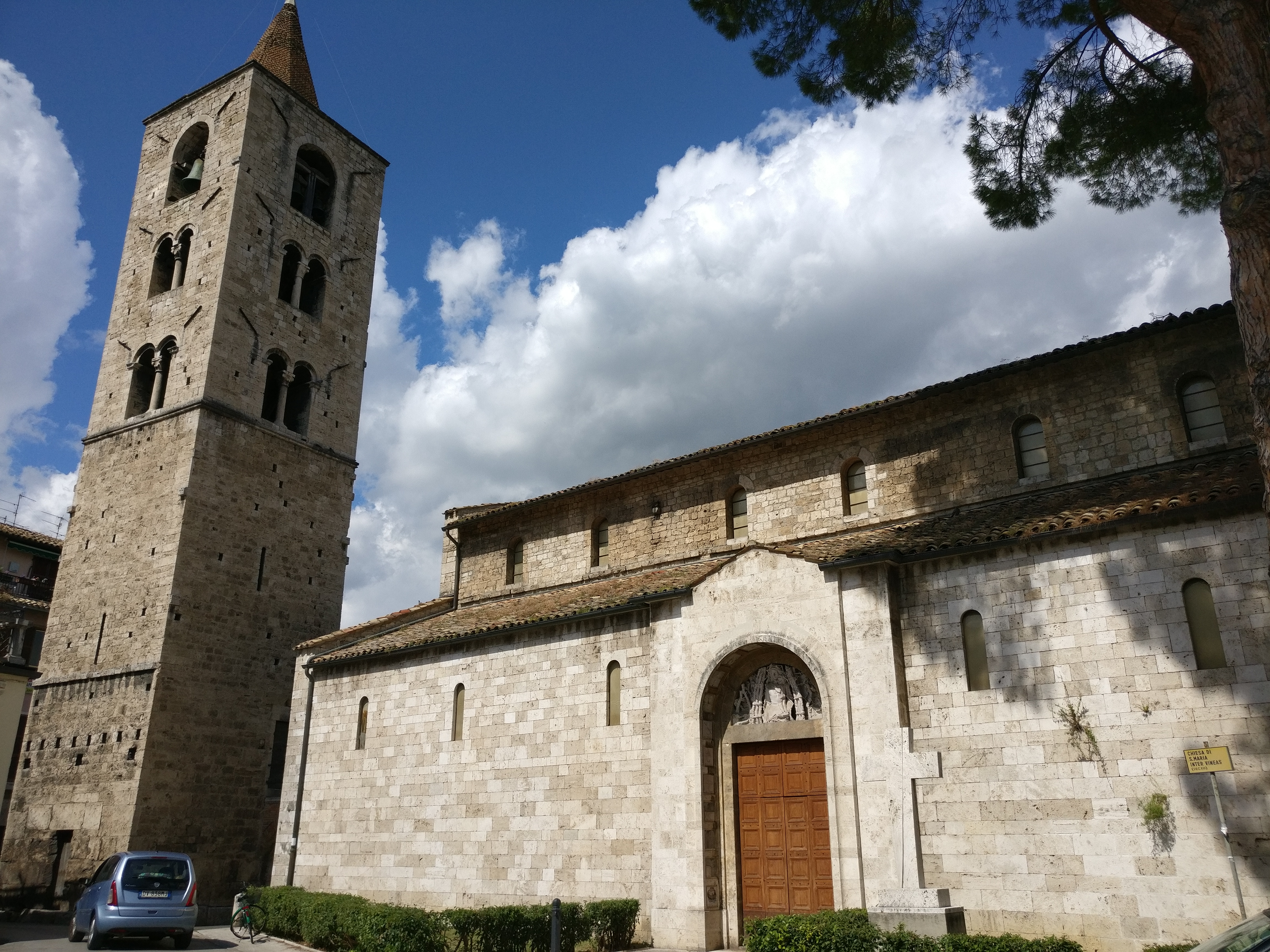
church of Santa Maria Intervineas

San Maria Inter Vineas (St Mary Among the Vineyards) is a late-Romanesque and early-Gothic-style, Roman Catholic church located on Largo del Cremore in the town of Ascoli Piceno in the region of Marche, Italy.

== History ==
The church was begun in the 13th century, but the present church was altered over the centuries. The present main entrance is a façade on the right nave, which has both Romanesque and Gothic elements, and has a single portal. The belltower, detached from the church likely reutilizes a former private watchtower, now complete with mullioned windows. the interior is divided into a nave and two aisles by alternating pilasters and columns. A 1950–1954 restoration uncovered traces of 13th-century frescoes, including an Enthroned Madonna and Child between St John the Evangelist and St Michael the Archangel weighing souls. The church also houses the 15th-century, travertine marble tomb monument of Nicola Pizzuti, built as a gothic-renaissance style tabernacle, with frescoes of the school of Carlo Crivelli in the spandrels, depicting the Evangelists and Cardinal Virtues.
