= Olive all'ascolana =

Italian appetizer

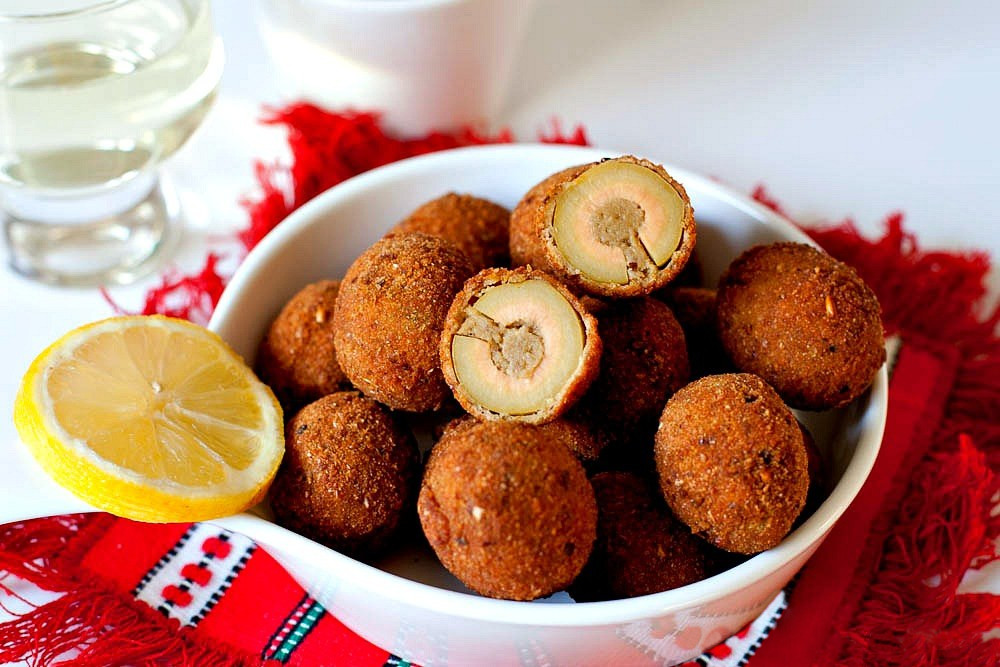
- Alternative names: Olive ascolane ripiene
- Course: Antipasto
- Place of origin: Italy
- Region or state: Marche
- Serving temperature: Hot
- Main ingredients: Olives, meat, soffritto, breadcrumbs, cheese

Olive all'ascolana, also known as olive ascolane ripiene, is an Italian appetizer (antipasto) of fried olives stuffed with meat.

== History ==
Olive all'ascolana was first created in Ascoli Piceno, in the Italian region of Marche, around 1800. The dish was created by private chefs to use leftover meat after parties or celebrations at wealthy estates. The dish is served as an appetizer (antipasto) at bars with aperitifs. It is also served at festivals in paper cones. In 2015, Mimi Sheraton named featured the dish in her book 1,000 Foods to Eat Before you Die.

== Dish and variations ==
The traditional recipe involves cutting Ascolano, or green olives, away from their pits in a spiral and forming the olive around a small ball of meat. Contemporary recipes also use pitted olives. The meat is often a mix of different meats, including veal, beef, pork, or chicken. The meat is sauteed with soffritto. It is then stewed in white wine, ground up, and mixed with cheese (Parmesan or Grana Padano). Some recipes call for nutmeg, garlic or red chili flakes to be added to the mixture, including a recipe by Sanjeev Kapoor. The olives might also be stuffed with sweet Italian sausage, or in coastal areas, fish. The stuffed olives are then rolled in egg and breadcrumbs and fried in vegetable oil.

Some chefs serve them with a lemon wedge and other fried food, such as sage, lamb chops or custard. Olive all'ascolana pairs with dry, crisp white wines, including Verdicchio or Pinot blanc.

== Oliva Ascolana del Piceno DOP ==
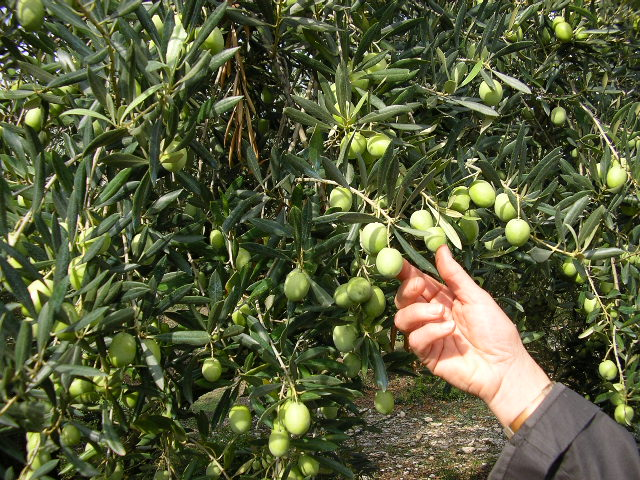
The Ascolana Tenera cultivar, essential in the preparation of the Oliva Ascolana del Piceno DOP

The "Oliva Ascolana del Piceno DOP" is a gastronomic specialty of the Piceno zone, in the Marche region. The name refers to either stuffed or brined olives of the "Ascolana Tenera" cultivar (Ascolano) grown in that area. Popular in Italy and abroad, it has gained the protected designation of origin (PDO) by the European law since 2005 and a proper consortium was established in 2018.

=== Origin of the name ===
The name comes from the Italian word oliva ('olive') and the adjective ascolana that refers to the city of Ascoli Piceno, the original place of the product.

=== Characteristics ===
The big green "Ascolana Tenera" olive belongs to the Olea europaea sativa genus and it is known since the times of ancient Rome. Locally it is also called Liva da Concia, Liva Ascolana or Liva di San Francesco. These fruits are valued for their crunchiness and the fullness of their pulp. Picked up before the complete ripening, they are dipped into a sodium hydroxide (NaOH) solution which significantly reduces their bitter taste. Then, they are water-washed and put in brine.

The stuffed olives follow the same procedure but are later pitted, filled with minced meat, and deep-fried in oil. They can be served by their own or with other types of fried food (lamb cutlets, zucchinis, artichokes, cream) to create the so-called fritto misto all'ascolana (lit. 'Ascoli-style mixed fried'). They might be still hot when served and can be accompanied with some slices of lemon. It is a typical dish for festivities and events.

The hand-made olives can be recognized thanks to the spiral shape they have once the pit is removed, a cut called ricciolo ('curl'). In addition, the PDO official regulations and guidelines imposes some strict rules about the proportion of the ingredients: beef can't exceed 70% of the total amount of meat used for the stuffling, pork can't exceed 50%, and chicken 10%. The pitless olive must be at least 40% of the total weight of the final product.

=== History ===
The Romans called these olives colymbades (from the Greek verb κολυμβάω, colymbáo, meaning 'to swim') for their method of conservation in brine, or also Ulivae Picenae. They are mentioned by authors as Cato the Elder, Marcus Terentius Varro, Martial, and Petronius who describes them as a constant presence on the table of the character Trimalchio. The fall of the Roman Empire did not stop the business of the olives: in particular, it is known that during the Middle Age it was a main activity for the local Olivetans monks. In the 16th century Pope Sixtus V, who was born in the Piceno region, wrote about them in a letter sent to the Major Elders of Ascoli Piceno. A century later, instead, there are reports about the first type of stuffed olives. At that time, the filling was composed with herbs and they were called olive giudee (lit. 'Jewish olives').

The current recipe came out during the 19th century from the palaces of Ascoli aristocratic families. In fact, by that period, the nobles were essentially landowners so their peasants had to regularly bring them some products from their possessions especially meat, the main food in aristocratic diet. In order to manage the great amount of beef and pork without make them rot, the cooks at service in the mansions started to mince the meat and put it inside the olives.

During the same period, the Ascolana olive found new illustrious admirers in the musicians Gioachino Rossini and Giacomo Puccini. Even Giuseppe Garibaldi, who discovered this specialty during a brief stay in Ascoli Piceno while escaping from Rome in 1849, was really impressed by its taste and, years after, he tried to plant the cultivar in his island, Caprera, without any success. But, despite that spreading, the production of olives was kept as a familiar or artisanal activity until 1875 when the local engineer Mariano Mazzocchi developed the first industry in order to commercialize the product.

=== Events ===
Since 2013 the Ascoliva Festival is held in Ascoli Piceno in August to promote and publicize the Ascolana olive and other typical food of the region. It is composed by several stands organized by small producers where is possible to taste various local specialties and learn about their history and their connection with culture and environment. The location is the historical central square of the city, Piazza Arringo.
