= San Vittore, Ascoli Piceno =

Roman Catholic church in Ascoli Piceno, Italy

Coordinates: 42°51′09.8″N 13°34′58.4″E

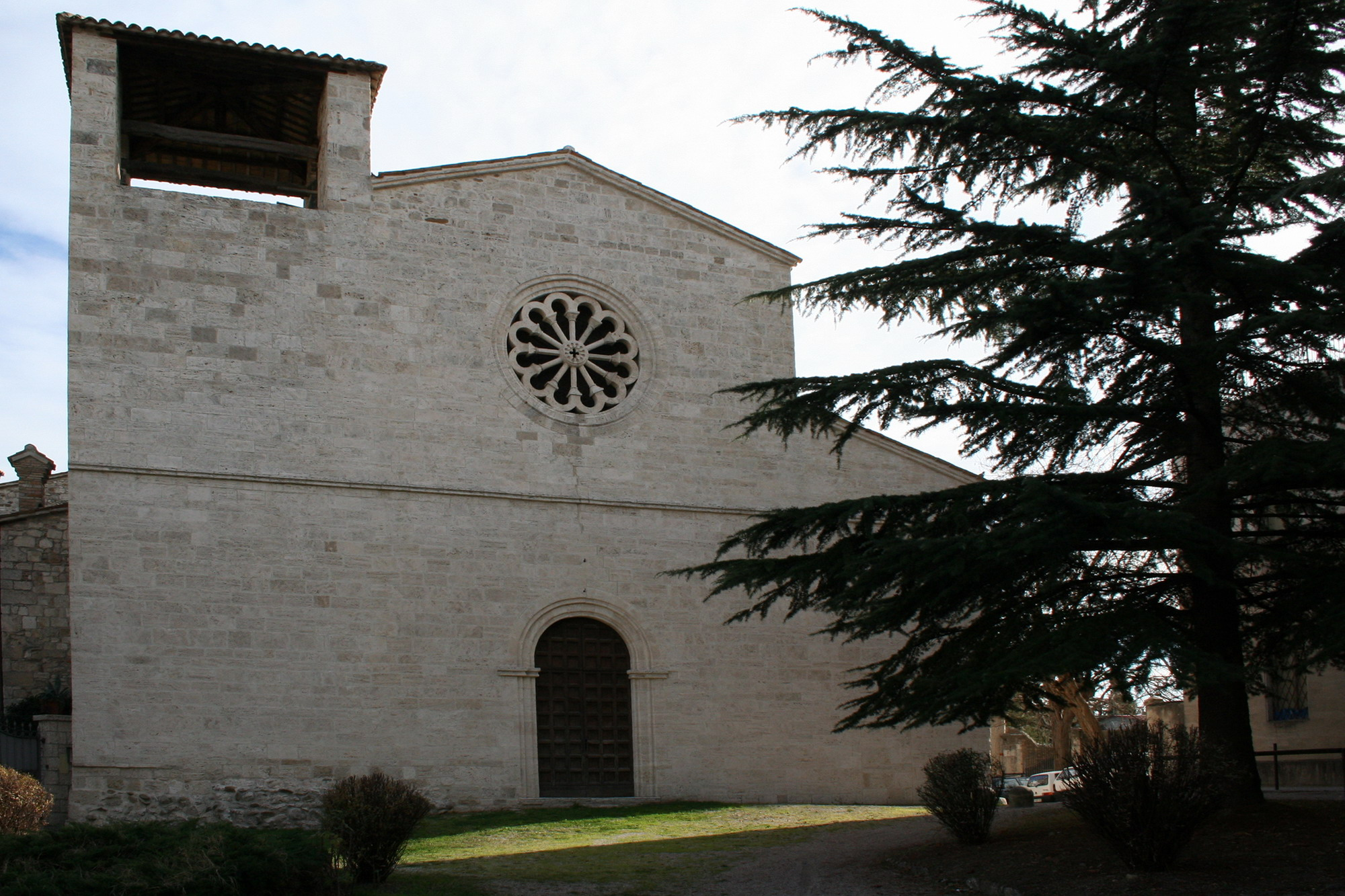
Church of San Vittore in Ascoli Piceno)

San Vittore is a Romanesque and Gothic-style, Roman Catholic church located in the town of Ascoli Piceno in the region of Marche, Italy.

== History ==
The structure was documented as a pieve church in the 10th century, built at the site of a former first century oratory. The church is built from travertine marble blocks. The present layout and façade date to a reconstruction during the 13th century, after the sack of the town by the troops of Frederick II in 1242.

The façade has a Gothic rose window which was restored in 1924. It has a rounded central portal leading to a basilica layout with three naves. The attached squat square bell-tower once likely housed the pieve's baptistery; it was rebuilt after a lightning bolt razed the prior tower in 1502.

The interior houses some anonymous frescoes from the mid to late 13th century. These once decorated the exterior and interior of the church. Many of those from the right nave were detached and moved to the Museo Diocesano. The transept is elevated relative to the nave, and leads to a pentagonal apse with gothic mullioned windows. The entrance to the Crypt of St Eustachio is from the outside of the church: it contains a cycle of frescoes from the 14th century depicting the life of the saint and attributed to the Maestro di Offida.
