= Serafino Tramezzini =

Italian sculptor (1859–1893)

Serafino Tramezzini or Tramazzini (Ascoli Piceno, 21 January 1859 – 1893) was an Italian sculptor. He trained under professor Giorgio Paci in Ascoli Piceno. He then moved to Rome, where he worked under sculptor Giulio Moschetti. He made a marble bust of Venudio Basso for the Palazzo Comunale of Ascoli.

The city also commissioned a memorial plaque commemorating the visit of Garibaldi to Ascoli in 1848, to give a patriotic speech. Tramazzini, in his hometown, produced many funereal monuments and marble decorations and plaques.
