= Lazzaro Morelli =

Italian sculptor

Lazzaro Morelli (1619 – 1690) was an Italian sculptor of the Baroque period.

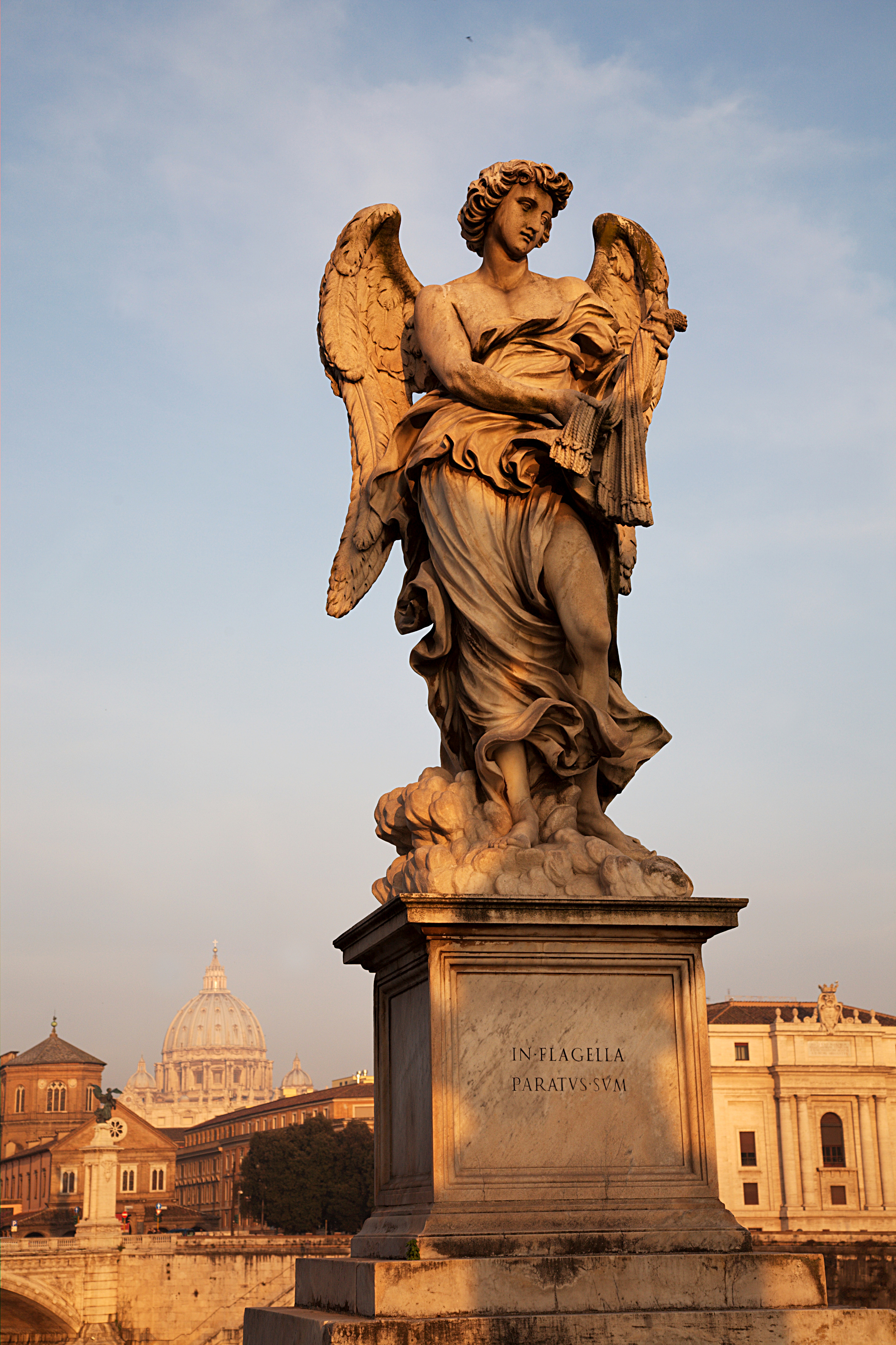
Angel with scourge

Lazzaro Morelli was born in Ascoli Piceno, the son of the Florentine sculptor Fulgenzio Morelli, who also trained Lazzaro's cousin, the artist Giuseppe Giosafatti. Lazzaro initially came to Rome to work under Francesco Fiammingho (François Duquesnoy), but left that studio to work under Bernini.

Morelli participated in Bernini's Funereal Monument for Pope Alexander VII Chigi, found in St. Peter's Basilica. He was also responsible for the Angel with the scourge, based on a sketch by Bernini; this is one of the angels on the Ponte Sant'Angelo in Rome. He is said to have sculpted the horse and the lion for Bernini's Fountain of the Four Rivers in Piazza Navona. He also sculpted the statue of Benignity for the tomb of Clement X in St. Peter's. The tomb was designed by Mattia de' Rossi (1684); the other sculptors who worked on this project were Ercole Ferrata (who sculpted the pope) and Giuseppe Mazzuoli (who sculpted the statue of Clemency). Morelli also completed some of the saints in the roof-line of the external colonnades of Piazza San Pietro.

== Sources ==
- City of Ascoli Piceno website.
- New Attributions in St. Peter's: The Spandrel Figures in the Nave, Robert Enggass. The Art Bulletin, Vol. 60, No. 1 (Mar., 1978), pp. 96–108. doi:10.2307/3049748.
- Cristiano Marchegiani, "Morelli, Lazzaro", in Dizionario biografico degli Italiani, Roma, Istituto della Enciclopedia Italiana, Treccani, vol. LXXVI, 2012, pp. 631–634.
