= Francis Cellini =

American priest

Francesco (Francis) Cellini, CM (c. 1781 – January 6, 1849) was an American Vincentian priest who served in the Midwestern United States during the mid-1800s. After serving in Louisiana, Missouri, and Illinois, Cellini's ministerial work concluded with a posting in St. Louis, where he was made Vicar General of the St. Louis Diocese.

== Biography ==
Cellini was born in the province of Ascoli Piceno, Marche, Italy. By 1818, he was the chaplain of the Hospital Santo Spirito in Rome in the Rione neighborhood near Vatican City. That same year (at age 37), he joined the Vincentians.

=== Journey to America ===
Through the command of Bishop Louis Dubourg of St. Louis, who was seeking priests to fulfill missionary work in the United States, Fr. Cellini and two other priests, Filippo Borgna and Antonio Potini, traveled to the Midwestern section of the U.S.

Cellini sailed from Livorno, Italy on July 2, 1818, to Gibraltar where on the 24th, he took another ship to Philadelphia. His journey from Europe to the U.S. took a reported "sixty-five days" with sixty of those days on open water without sight of land. Upon arrival at Philadelphia (landing around October 4), passengers were placed into quarantine. He wrote to Italy on October 8 informing Rome of his arrival. Proof of the letter exists in the archives at the Montecitorio in Rome. At that time, the Montecitorio was the seat of the Curia apostolica or, papal court.

=== Missouri ===
The clergymen ultimately settled at St. Mary of the Barrens in Perryville, Missouri in 1819. In the early 1800s the parish church and its surrounding community was in a very primitive state. The young community lacked basic shelter and so Cellini and others, including Du Bourg, "labored like hired work [men]" in the sun. After a period of time in Missouri, Cellini was then appointed "Procurator and General Factotum" of the parish church, that is he was charged with handling financial matters along with general clerical duties. In this period, Cellini was serving a community of "seventy French people", a fact found in a letter written by Joseph Rosati who would later serve as first bishop of the Diocese of Saint Louis.

Cellini received his education in Italy and Italian was his native language. However once assigned to the Midwestern region of the U.S., he had to communicate with parishioners in their native tongues—French and English. "The zealous father preached every Sunday in French or English, but never could, in these alien tongues, acquire that perfect mastery…he possessed in the Italian. Besides he was subject to a slight stammer in his speech, which was scarcely noticeable except when the right word failed him."

In published accounts of the era the reverend listed as Francis, under the English variant of his given name or he is seen listed as Francois, the French variant.

=== Louisiana ===
From Missouri, Cellini went on to serve as Pastor of Sacred Heart in Grand Coteau, Louisiana where he worked from 1822 to 1824. He is also documented as having been a part of St. Charles Borromeo Catholic Church in Grand Coteau. There is historical debate on why he left Grand Coteau, especially when his work was needed there and he not only ministered spiritual needs but his medical abilities were extensive, owing to the fact he'd reportedly been "a surgeon in the Italian army" so his skills were commanded.

Cellini's combination of clergyman-doctor was unique and was a bonus to the Catholic Church in the Midwest. "…[W]herever the good Father found himself he also found body miseries and ills that called forth his sympathy and healing power."

Fuelling debate as to why he left Louisiana, information in the St. Louis Catholic Historical Review of January–April 1922 noted Cellini took it upon himself to accept a donation in the name of the parish inter-vivos (third-party fiduciary relationship) from Mary Smith (née, Santee) of Opelousas, Louisiana while she was ill. The large donation was to be used for a preparatory seminary and Smith had a history of providing donations to the church at Opelousas.

It was Cellini's (and possibly Potini's) personal acceptance of the donation consisting of slaves, personal effects and real estate holdings that troubled church hierarchy. Even Smith reportedly asked Cellini to "annul the donation" so to avoid trouble over the "appearance of the transaction". Tensions involving Cellini reached a climax to the point there were "threats on his life". Cellini's superiors (chiefly Dubourg and Rosati) made a decision at that point to suspend him as well as to remove him from his post.

=== Brief return to Europe ===
Over this, Cellini became angry and met with Rosati to appeal for a "demission of vows" and a return to Rome. In the summer of 1825, Cellini did return to Rome and from there filed a complaint stating, "…Bishop DuBourg had deprived him of the office of a Parish Priest…in the diocese of Bardstown (Kentucky)." Due to a lack of historical documentation, there is a gap on the whereabouts of Cellini during the mid-1820s. The gap is likely due to the fact he simply remained in Italy under the supervision of Antonio Baccari, Vicar General of the Congregation of the Mission in Rome, without much contact with United States prelates.

=== Return to Missouri ===
However, his time overseas was short. Cellini was back in the United States by 1827 as member of the diocesan clergy of St. Louis, Missouri. Rosati, then in St. Louis, assigned him to the Parishes of Prairie du Rocher and Kaskaskia (both in Randolph County, Illinois) where he remained until 1830 (some sources claim 1829). Following his departure from Illinois, Cellini was appointed pastor of St. Michael the Archangel Parish in Fredericktown, Missouri. Cellini either purchased the land for the sanctuary through his own funds or made the purchase on behalf of the curia. Per Rosati's report to the Leopoldine Society of Europe on March 10, 1830, he notes, "As the Catholic population was increasing, Cellini in 1829 started the work of building a church on his land in Fredericktown". It is estimated the new church was completed by 1831.

At this time, Smith of Opelousas, Louisiana returned to aid the clergy helping fund the first institution for higher learning in Madison County, Missouri. It was through her donations that a convent for the Sisters of Loretto was built under Cellini's direction. In addition, a school for girls was completed. Proof of the school is documented in the "Shepherd of the Valley", the first Catholic newspaper published west of the Mississippi River.

=== Vicar General of St Louis ===
In 1845, Cellini was made Vicar General of the Diocese of St. Louis. In his advanced age, he remained primarily in St. Louis and retired to the structure that is today the House of the Guardian Angel, founded by the Daughters of Charity of Saint Vincent de Paul.

=== Death ===
At the time of his death on January 6, 1849, Cellini was reportedly the eldest priest in the St. Louis Diocese. Subsequently, that same year, his godchild died of cholera as did diocese benefactor Smith. Cellini is buried at Calvary Cemetery and Mausoleum, St. Louis, Missouri.
