= Giuseppe Angelini (bishop) =

Italian bishop (1810–1876)

Giuseppe Angelini (21 October 1810 in Ascoli Piceno – 8 June 1876) was an Italian Roman Catholic bishop. He was appointed Auxiliary Bishop of Rome and titular archbishop of Corinthus on 21 December 1868, and also served as Council Father to the First Vatican Council.

== Sources ==
- http://www.catholic-hierarchy.org/bishop/bangg.html
