= Tommaso Nardini =

Italian painter and priest (1658 - 1718)

Tommaso Nardini (1658 – December 9, 1718) was an Italian priest and painter of the Baroque period, active in his native town.

== Biography ==
Born in Ascoli Piceno, Nardini was a pupil of Ludovico Trasi. and upon the latter's death, he worked under Giuseppe Giosafatti. He painted an altarpiece of a Saint interceding with the Virgin and Child for Souls of Purgatory (1710) for the Chiesa della Misericordia in Ancarano, Province of Teramo In collaboration with Agostino Collaceroni, he painted quadratura frescoes in the church of Sant'Angelo Magno, which was the church of the Olivetani in Ascoli; Nardini adding the figures. Nardini also frescoed much of the ceiling decoration of the Duomo di Sant'Emidio of his hometown. He died in Ascoli Piceno on December 9, 1718.
