= Piazza del Popolo, Ascoli Piceno =

Coordinates: 42.8545°N 13.5755°E

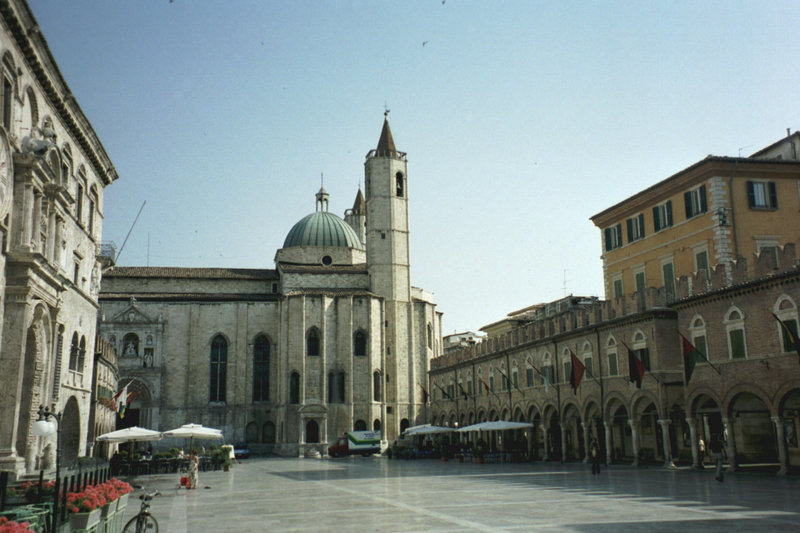
Piazza del Popolo

Piazza del Popolo is a city square in Ascoli Piceno, Italy.

== Buildings around the square ==
- Basilica of San Francesco
- Aedicule of Lazzaro Morelli
