= Campolungo-Villa Sant'Antonio =

Italian frazione in the province of Ascoli Piceno

- Frazione
- Location of Campolungo-Villa Sant'Antonio in Italy
- Coordinates: 42°51′26.8″N 13°41′38.11″E
- Country: Italy
- Region: Marche
- Province: Province of Ascoli Piceno (AP)
- Comune: Ascoli Piceno
- Elevation: 72 m (236 ft)

Population
  - Total: 716
- Time zone: UTC+1 (CET)
  - Summer (DST): UTC+2 (CEST)
- Postal code: 63100
- Dialing code: 0736
- Patron saint: Saint Mary of the Assumption
- Saint day: 15th August

Campolungo-Villa Sant'Antonio is a frazione (hamlet) of the comune (municipality) of Ascoli Piceno, Marche, Italy. The frazione has a population of 716 people, and it is located about 10,5 km east of Ascoli Piceno.

== Geography ==
The frazione is located east of Ascoli Piceno, in a lower and flatter area of the Tronto valley. The settlement is crossed by the Salaria highway. The frazione border to the north with the comuni of Castel di Lama and Castorano, to the east with Colli del Tronto and to the south with Maltignano, Sant'Egidio alla Vibrata and Ancarano, of which the last two are located in Abruzzo. In Campolungo-Villa Sant'Antonio is located part of the industrial area of the comune of Ascoli Piceno.

== History and monuments ==
The history of Campolungo-Villa Sant'Antonio is tied to the one of the Sgariglia noble family, which had its residence there. The main mouments of the frazione are Villa Sgariglia, the baroque villa of the Sgariglia family, the church of Saint Mary of the Assumption, built in 1777 and dedicated to the patron saint of the settlement, Castello di Cartofaro (Castle of Cartofaro), a noble residence built in the 16th century and the Fermo Posta, which was used as a stopping point for travellers.
