= Battle of Asculum (disambiguation) =

The Battle of Asculum (279 BC) was a battle of the Pyrrhic War between the Roman Republic and the forces of King Pyrrhus of Epirus.

Battle of Asculum may also refer to:

- Battle of Asculum (89 BC), a battle of the Social War between Rome and its former Italian allies
- Battle of Asculum (209 BC), or Battle of Canusium, a battle of the Second Punic War between Rome and Carthage
