= Girolamo Buratti =

Italian painter

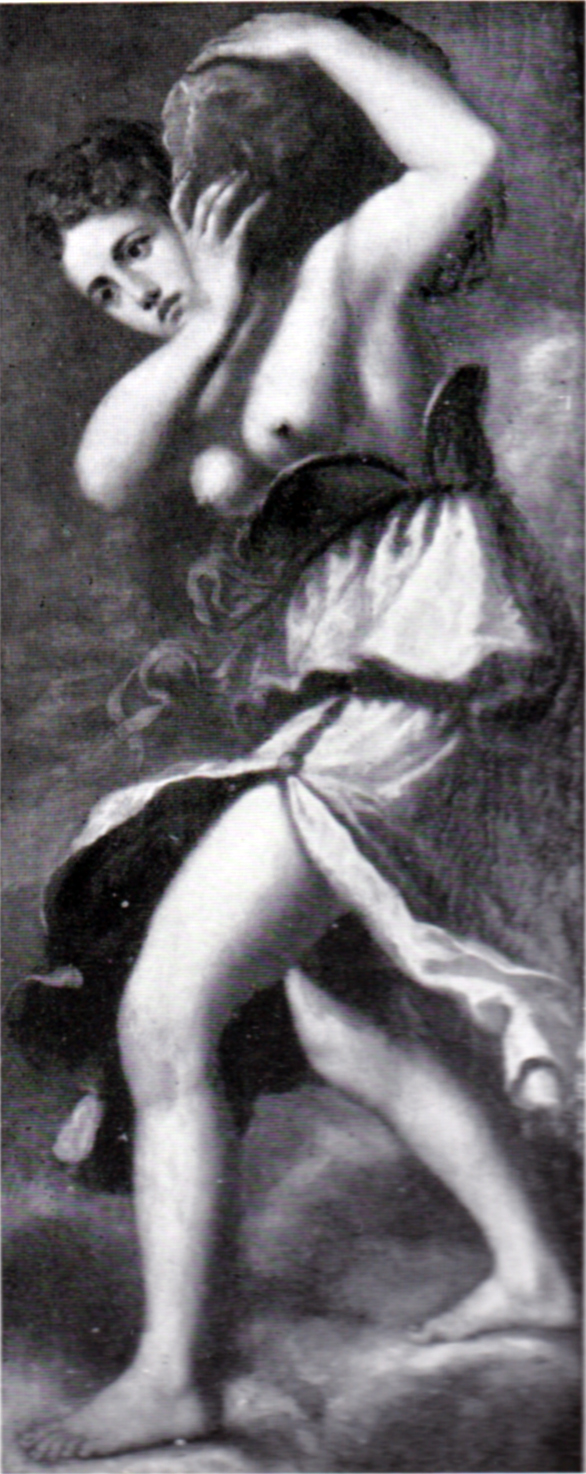

Girolamo Buratti (active 1580) was an Italian painter of the late Renaissance, active in his native Ascoli Piceno. Here, in the Santa Maria della Carità Church, he painted on the walls a cycle of frescoes representing "Histories of Exodus" and the Presepio for main altar.
