= Museo delle Arti Monastiche =

Museo delle Arti Monastiche e delle tradizioni popolari
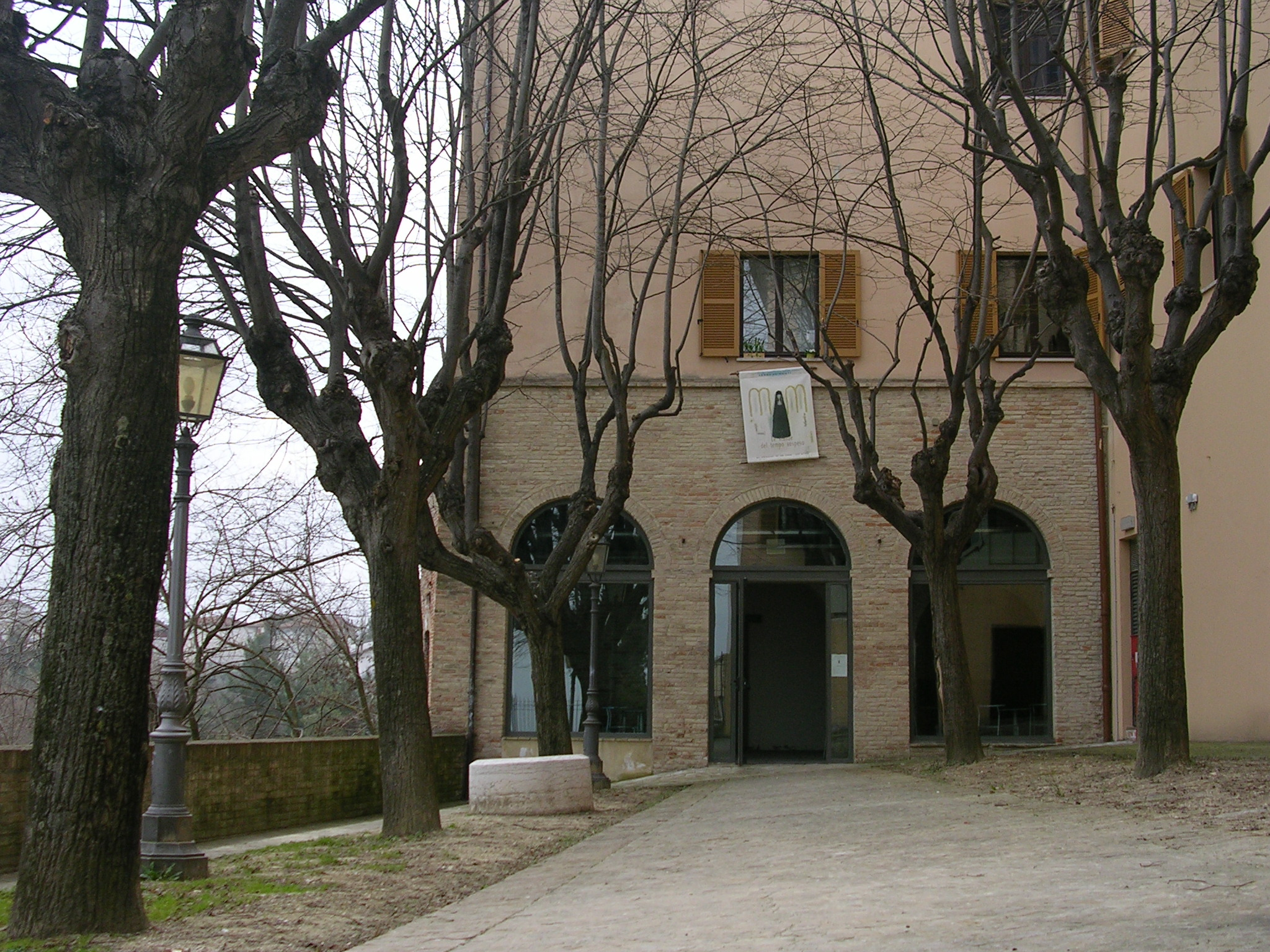
- Museum of Monastic Arts
- Location: c/o Palazzo Comunale via Marconi 6 Serra de' Conti (Ancona Province); Italy
- Website: http://www.museoartimonastiche.it/

The Museo delle Arti Monastiche e delle tradizioni popolari (Museum of Monastic Arts and Popular Traditions, also known as the Museo Arti Monastiche or MAM) is a museum in Serra de' Conti, Ancona Province, Italy. The museum showcases various art and artifacts from the nearby Monastery of St. Mary Magdalene of Serra de 'Conti.
