= Nicola Filotesio =

Italian painter

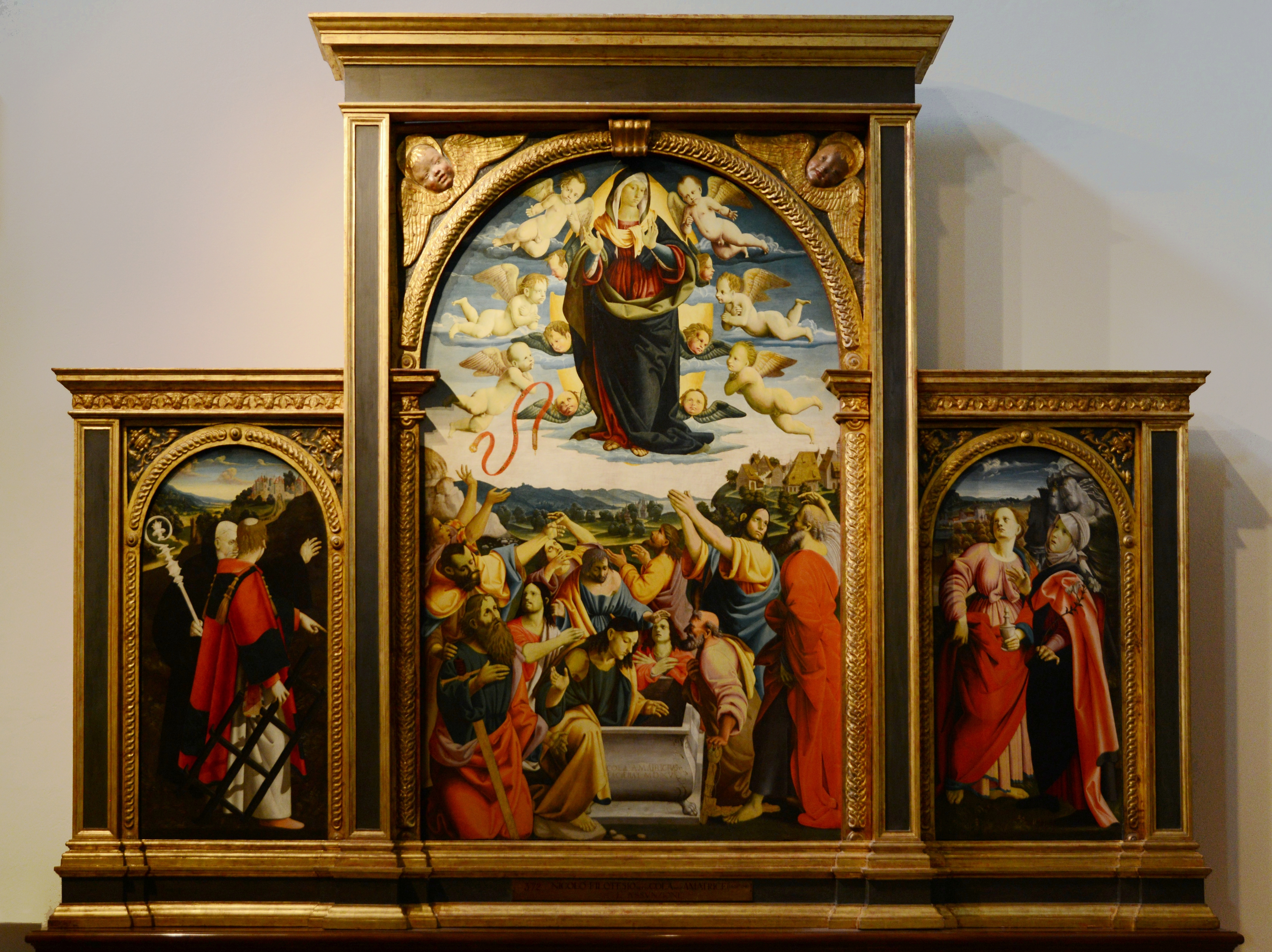
Assumption of the Virgin (Vatican Museums, Rome)

Nicola Filotesio (9 September 1480 [differing sources give 1489]—31 August 1547 [sources also give 1559]) was an Italian painter, architect and sculptor of the Renaissance period, active primarily in or near the town of Ascoli Piceno (modern capital of Ascoli Piceno Province in the Marche region).

A native of the town of Amatrice in the Bourbon region of Abruzzo (at present day part of the Province of Rieti in the Lazio region), Nicola Filotesio also appears in contemporary records as Cola dell'Amatrice or Cola Amatricius. The son of Mariano Filotesio, he trained with Dionisio Cappelli, painted frescoes at Città di Castello and completed, between 1514 and 1535, works of art in Ascoli Piceno. He designed the façade of the basilica of San Bernardino in L'Aquila.

The date and place of Nicola Filotesio's birth have been historically recorded, but the year has varied within a nine-year period, having been variously indicated as 1480 and 1489. Similarly, the date of his death and the place (Ascoli Piceno) are on record, but the year has varied within a twelve-year range, being given as 1547 or 1559.

A museum dedicated to Filotesio's work stood in the town of his birth until it was destroyed in a 2016 earthquake.
