= Ludovico Trasi =

Italian painter

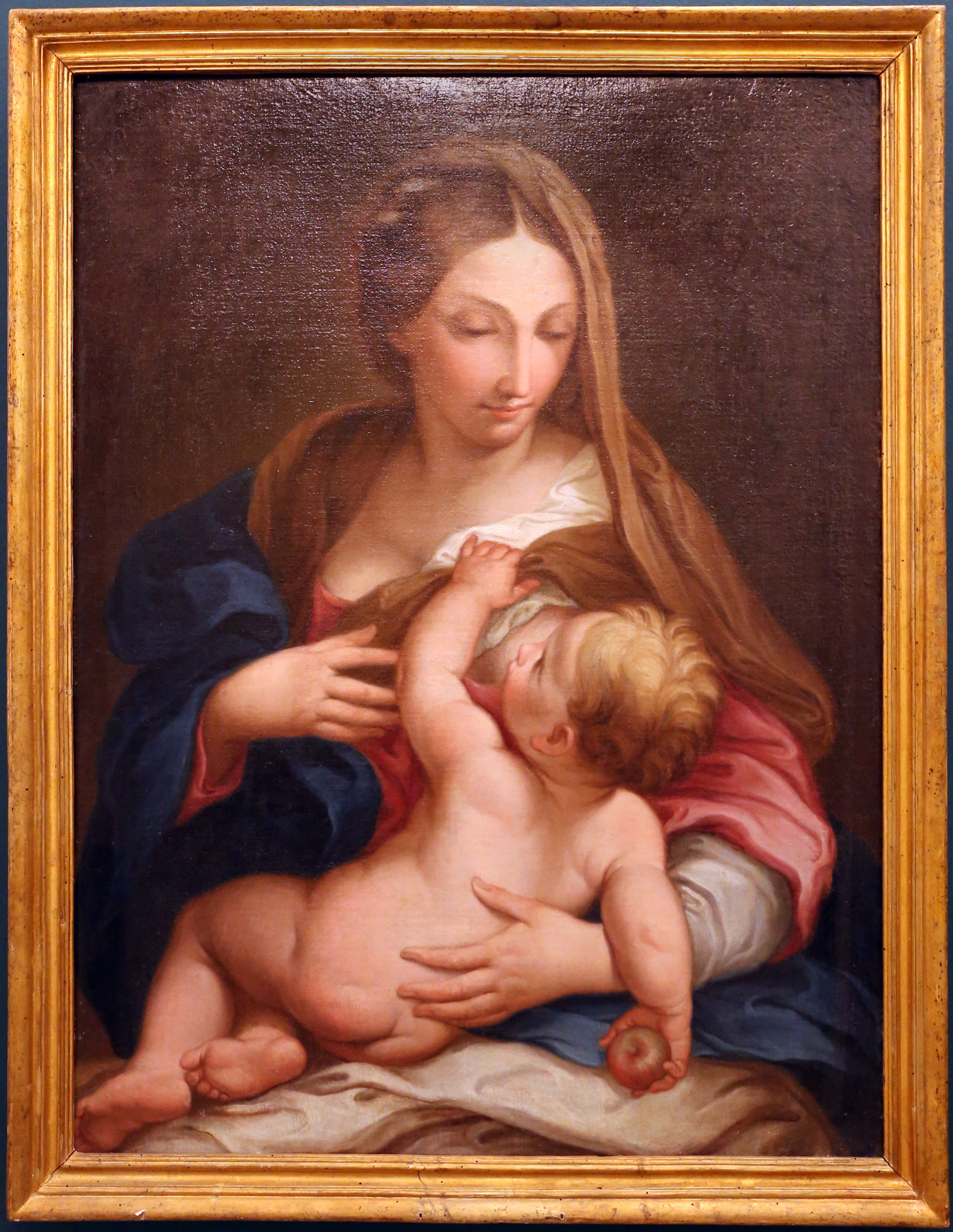
Madonna and Child, Ascoli, Pinacoteca Civica

Ludovico Trasi (1634–February 20, 1694) was an Italian painter of the Baroque period, born and active in Ascoli Piceno.

Trasi was born to a little known painter, Antonio Trasi, who sent his son to study abroad. Contemporarily with his lifelong friend Carlo Maratta, Trasi was a pupil of Andrea Sacchi in Rome. Returning to Ascoli, he was active in painting churches and as a scenic designer for the theater. One of his masterworks is the Miracle of San Nicola di Bari for the church of San Cristoforo, Ascoli Piceno.

Among his pupils were Tommaso Nardini and Luca Vitelli (died 1730). His brother, Giovanni Trasi, was also a painter and became a later collaborator in quadratura with Pier-Sante Cicala.
