= Giuseppe Giosafatti =

Italian architect and sculptor

Giuseppe Giosafatti (1643–1733) was an Italian architect and sculptor, mainly active in the city of Ascoli Piceno.

His father, Antonio, was born in Venice and active in the late 1580s. Giuseppe's father placed him as an apprentice to his cousin Lazzaro Morelli, who worked in Rome for Bernini. In Rome, Giuseppe learned sculpture, and contributed to the work of the sculptural group of the Cathedra of St Peter in the Basilica and the Fountain at Piazza Navona.

He had four sons, three of whom were also sculptors and architects: Lazzaro (1694-1781, also a painter); Lorenzo (1696-1780); and Pietro (1699-1785). He established a large studio for training artists in Ascoli. He was buried in Santa Maria delle Grazie in Ascoli.
