= Ascoli Piceno =

Town in Marche, Italy

Città di Ascoli Piceno
- Comune
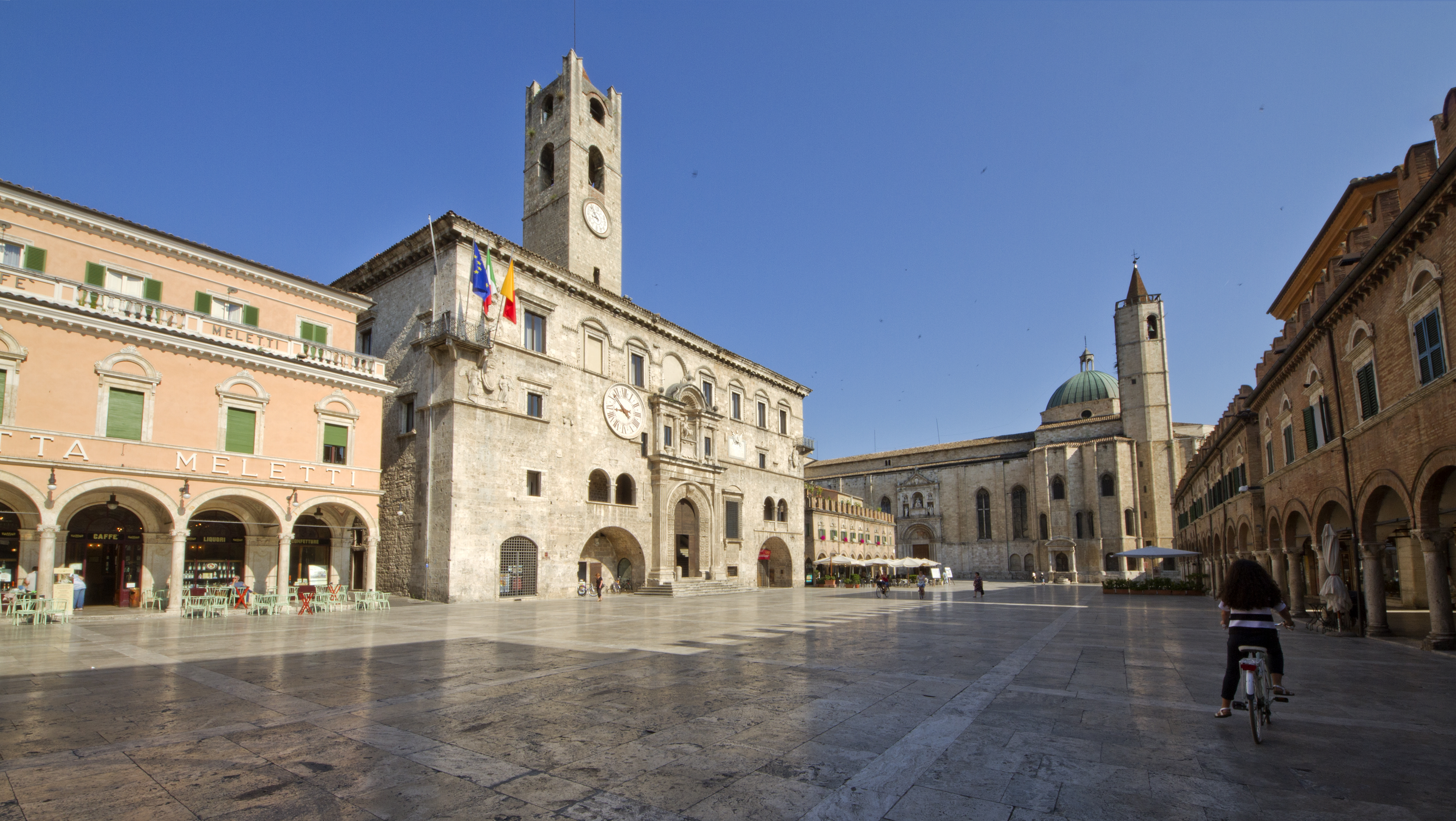
- Piazza del Popolo

- Flag Coat of arms

- Location within Italy Location within Marche
- Coordinates: 42°51′N 13°35′E
- Country: Italy
- Region: Marche
- Province: Ascoli Piceno (AP)
- Frazioni: see list

Area
  - Total: 160 km^{2} (62 sq mi)
- Elevation: 154 m (505 ft)

Population (31 July 2026)
  - Total: 45,074
  - Density: 280/km^{2} (730/sq mi)
- Demonym: Ascolani
- Time zone: UTC+1 (CET)
  - Summer (DST): UTC+2 (CEST)
- Patron saint: St. Emygdius
- Saint day: 5 August
- Website: Official website

Ascoli Piceno (Italian: [ˈaskoli piˈtʃɛːno]; Ascolano: Ascule; Latin: Asculum) is a comune (municipality) and capital of the province of Ascoli Piceno, in the Italian region of Marche. The city of Ascoli Piceno has an estimated population of around 45,100 as of 2026.

== Geography ==
The town lies at the confluence of the River Tronto and the small River Castellano and is surrounded on three sides by mountains. Two natural parks border the town, one on the northwestern flank (Parco Nazionale dei Monti Sibillini) and the other on the southern (Parco Nazionale dei Monti della Laga).

Ascoli has good rail connections to the Adriatic coast and the city of San Benedetto del Tronto, by highway to Porto d'Ascoli and by the Italian National Road 4 Salaria to Rome.

Ascoli Piceno has a humid subtropical climate (Cfa), according to the Köppen climate classification.

== History ==
Ausculum of ancient Picenum was founded by the Italic (Piceni) and was originally a Sabine city. Asculum was also the name of other places.

Following its defeat by the Romans in 268 BC, Asculum became a civitas foederata, a "federated" city with nominal independence from Rome. It was later connected by the important Via Salaria, the salt road that connected Latium with the salt production areas on the Adriatic coast.

It was the first Italian city to rise up against Rome in 91 BC during the Social War. An account described the city as home to a war-like people that bore generation-old grudge against Rome for encroaching on its northern territories. It was besieged and captured following the Battle of Asculum (89 BC). Discovered artifacts in the city such as sling bullets show that the siege included at least four Roman legions as well as Gallic and Spanish auxiliaries. Following the war, it became a municipium. In the triumviral period or under Augustus, it became a colonia.

During the Middle Ages Ascoli was ravaged by the Ostrogoths and then by the Lombards of King Faroald (578). After nearly two centuries as part of the Lombard Duchy of Spoleto (593–789), Ascoli was ruled by the Franks through their vicars, but ultimately it was the bishops that gained influence and power over the city.

In 1189 a free republican municipality was established but internal strife led dramatically to the demise of civic values and freedom and to unfortunate ventures against neighboring enemies. This unstable situation opened the way to foreign dictatorships, like those of Galeotto I Malatesta (14th century), initially recruited as a mercenary (condottiero) in the war against Fermo, and Francesco Sforza. Sforza was ousted in 1482, but Ascoli was again compelled to submit to the Papal suzerainty. In 1860 it was annexed, together with Marche and Umbria, into the newly unified Kingdom of Italy.

== Main sights ==
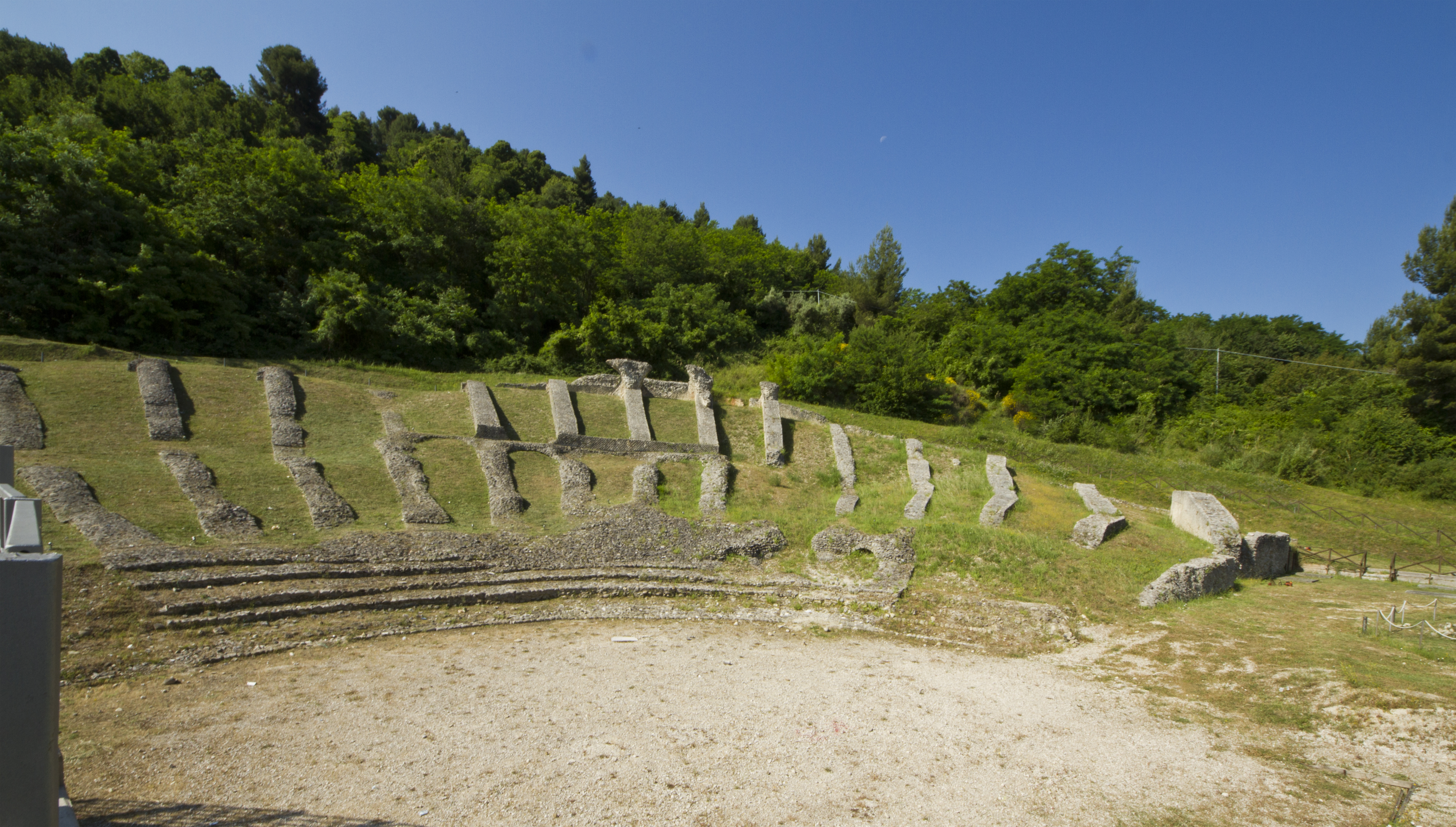
Roman Theatre

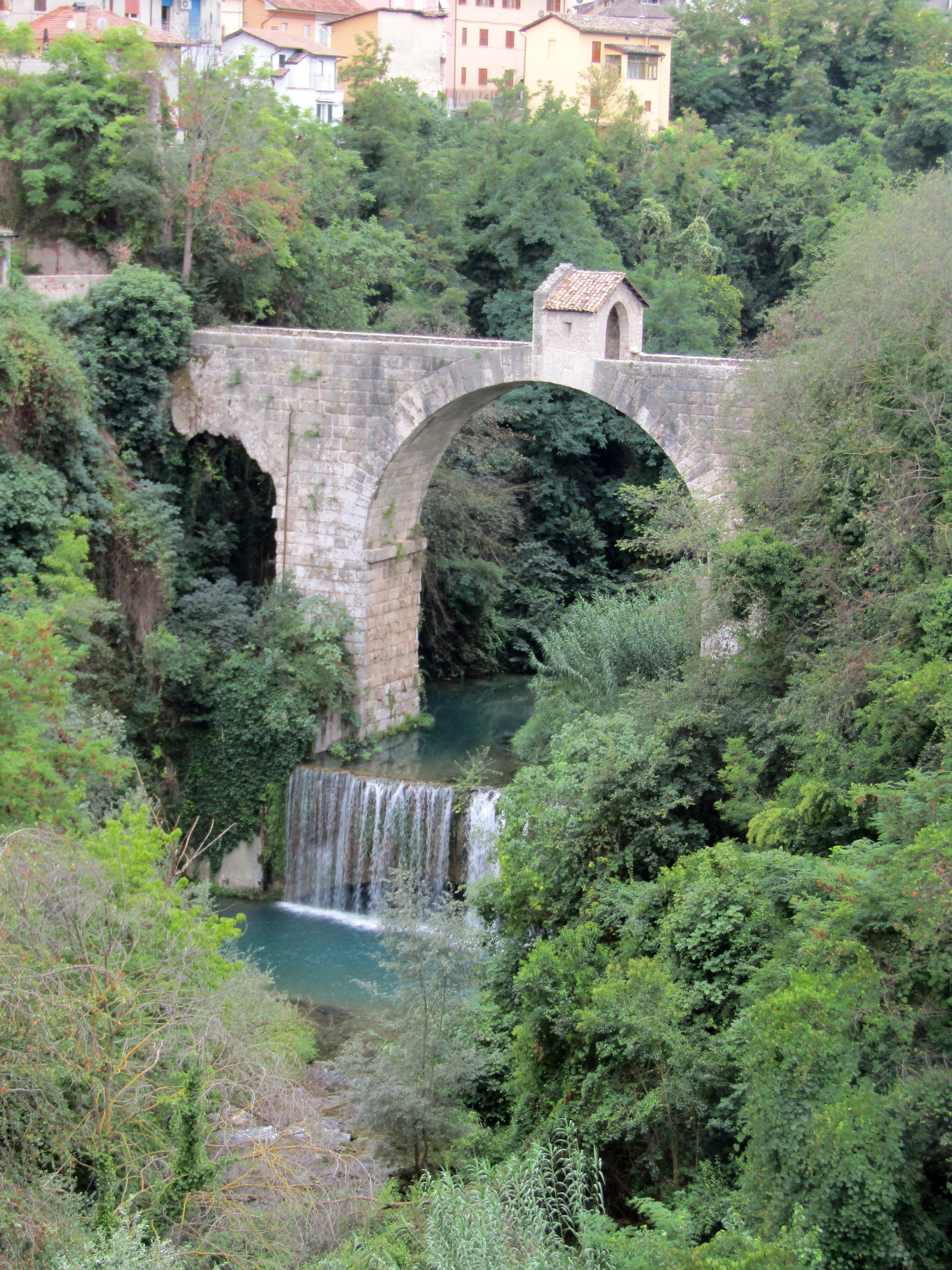
Roman ponte di Cecco

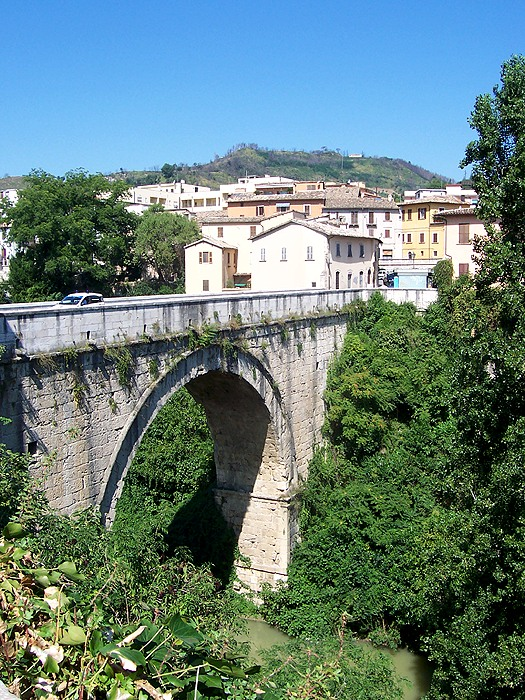
Roman Ponte di Solestà

Many of the buildings in the historical part of the city are built using local travertine. Near the Renaissance square Piazza del Popolo, the Piazza Arringo was the administrative and religious centre of the town, surrounded by the Cathedral, the baptistery, the Bishop's residence, and the Palace of the Commune.

According to traditional accounts, Ascoli Piceno housed some two hundred towers in the Middle Ages: today some fifty can still be seen.

=== Churches and convents ===
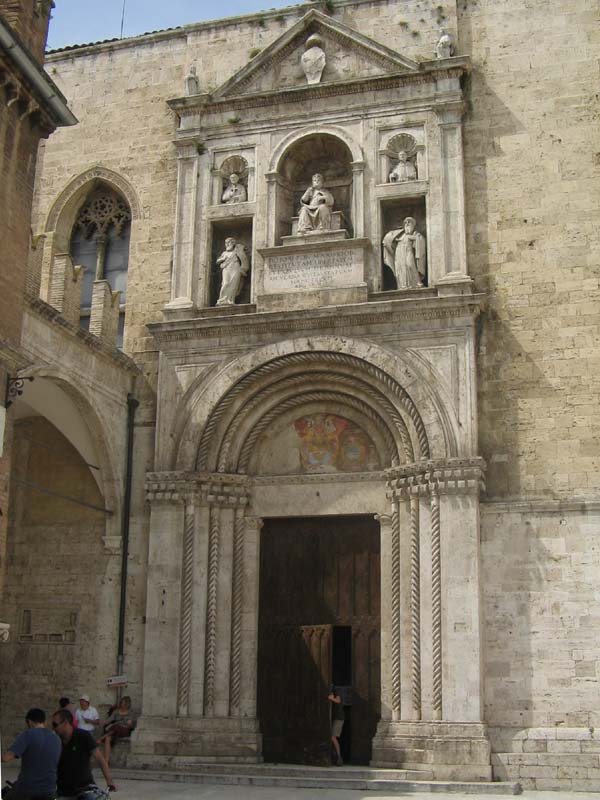
Church of San Francesco

- Cathedral of Sant'Emidio, dedicated to Saint Emygdius, houses an altarpiece by Carlo Crivelli.
- Tempietto di Sant'Emidio alle Grotte
- Tempietto di Sant'Emidio Rosso
- San Francesco: Gothic style church begun in 1258. The dome was completed in 1549. A monument to Pope Julius II is in the side portal, while the central portal is one of the finest examples of local travertine decoration. Adjacent to the church is the 16th century Loggia dei Mercanti, in Bramantesque style of the Roman High Renaissance.
- Convent of San Francesco: adjacent to the above-named church, of which two noteworthy cloisters remain today. It was once a prestigious center of culture, whose students included Pope Sixtus V.
- Sant'Agostino: 14th century church built originally with a single nave, was enlarged with two aisles in the late 15th century. The rectangular façade has a 1547 portal similar to that of Sant'Emidio. The convent houses the town library, the Contemporary Art Gallery and an auditorium.
- San Cristoforo: Catholic Baroque church located in the historic center of the city
- San Domenico: former convent, now school. It has a Renaissance cloister with 17th-century frescoes.
- Santa Maria Inter Vineas: 13th-century church
- San Pietro Martire: 13th-century church with a 1523 side portal by Nicola Filotesio, known locally as Cola d'Amatrice. The interior contains the precious reliquary of the Holy Thorn, a gift of Philip IV of France.
- San Tommaso: 1069 Romanesque-style church built with spolia from the neighboring Roman amphitheater
- San Vittore: Romanesque church documented from 996 with a low bell tower
- Edicola di Morelli: monumental Baroque niche attached to the exterior of the church of San Francesco at the Piazza del Popolo. The niche housed a venerated Madonna image, putatively designed by Lazzaro Morelli, a disciple of Gian Lorenzo Bernini.

=== Secular buildings ===
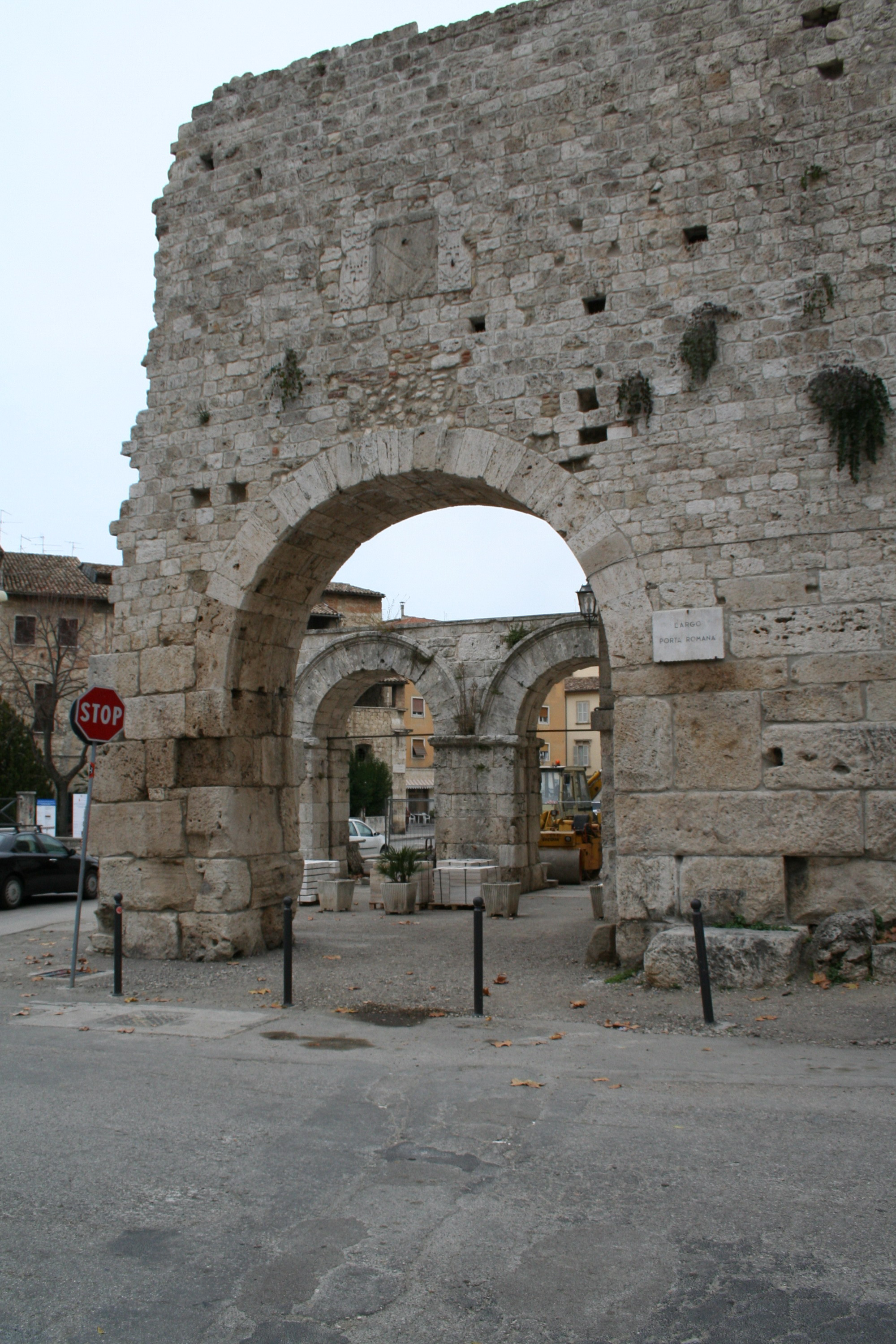
Porta Gemina

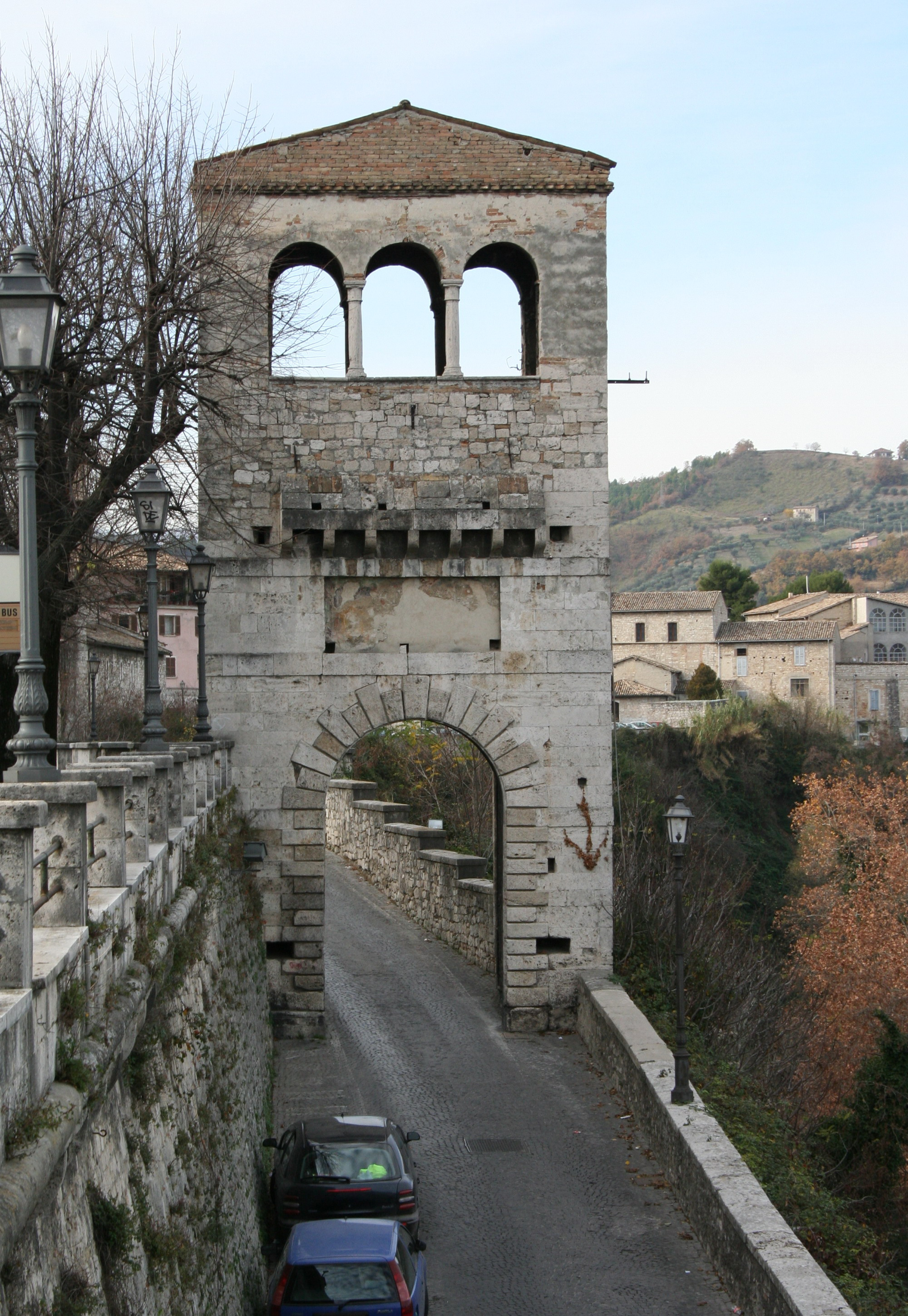
Porta Tufilla

- The Roman Ponte del Gran Caso
- Roman Solestà Bridge
- Ponte di Cecco: Roman bridge over the Castellano
- The Roman walls of the "Fortezza Pia" in the upper part of the town
- "Vesta's" temple: devoted to the cult of Isis
- Roman temple rebuilt as an auditorium
- The Palazzo dei Capitani del Popolo ('Palace of the People's Captains'). Built in the 13th century connecting three pre-existing edifices, it was the seat of the podestà, the people's captains and, later, of the Papal governors. In the 15th century the southern side was enlarged and, in 1520, a Mannerist façade was added in the rear side. In 1535 it underwent a general renovation, and in 1549 a new portal, with a monument of Pope Paul III, was added.
- Palazzo dell'Arengo: located near the Cathedral
- Palazzo Malaspina: palace in Corso Mezzini, previous 14th century structure reconstructed in the 16th century using designs attributed to architect Nicola Filotesio
- Porta Gemina ('Twin Gate'): an ancient Roman gate from the 1st century BC, through which the Via Salaria entered the city. The ruins of the ancient theater are located nearby. It had two passageways, each 5.70 metres (18.7 ft) tall and 2.95 metres (9.7 ft) wide.
- Porta Tufilla: a tower-like gate built in 1552–55. It is annexed to the Ponte Tufillo, a medieval bridge built in 1097 over the River Tronto.
- Ponte Maggiore ('Great Bridge'), of medieval origin
- Lombard Palace and the Ercolani Tower (11th-12th centuries)
- Loggia dei Mercanti: a 16th-century portico annexed to the church of San Francesco. It was commissioned by the city's wool traders guild and finished in 1513.
- Fortezza Pia: a fortress commanding the city, rebuilt in 1560 by Pope Pius IV (whence the name)
- Malatesta Fortress, in a site probably occupied by Roman baths. It was rebuilt by Galeotto I Malatesta, lord of Rimini, during the war against Fermo. The construction, used as a jail until 1978, was enlarged by Antonio da Sangallo the Younger in 1543.
- Grotte dell'Annunziata ('Grottoes of the Annunciation'), a large portico with niches from the 2nd-1st centuries BC, whose original function is unknown (it has been suggested that they could be barracks or slaves dwellings, or a fortified palace)

In Castel Trosino, not far from the city, in 1893 a rare 6th century Lombard necropolis was found.

=== Parks and gardens ===
- Giardino Botanico, Istituto Tecnico Agrario Statale "Celso Ulpiani", a botanical garden

== Economy ==
Recent industrialization has brought to Ascoli several Italian and multinational companies (YKK, Manuli, Pfizer, Barilla) but the bulk of the economy is made up of small and medium-sized enterprises and by those providing professional services to the area. Agriculture is still important (wheat, olives, fruits).

== Transport ==
Ascoli Piceno railway station, opened in 1886, is the southwestern terminus of the San Benedetto del Tronto–Ascoli Piceno railway, a branch of the Adriatic railway.

== Education ==
The city is the administrative headquarters and teaching the School of Architecture and Design at the University of Camerino and the International School on Safety and Environmental Protection private university's Alma Mater Europaea.

== Culture and sport ==
The main festivity is on the first Sunday in August. The historical parade with more than 1500 people dressed in Renaissance costume is held in celebration of Saint Emidio, protector of the city. The parade is followed by a tournament, called Quintana, in which six knights, each competing for one of the six neighborhoods in the city, ride the course one after the other trying to hit an effigy of an Arab warrior. Strength and ability are necessary for the knight to win the palio or grand prize.

The River Castellano is a site for swimming and bathing in summer.

Founded in 1898, Ascoli Calcio is the main football team in the city. It is one of the oldest teams in Italy and it played for 16 years in Serie A.

== Gastronomy ==
Olive all'ascolana is a dish which originated from this locality. It is prepared from olives.

== Demographics ==
Historical population
Year	Pop.	±%
1861	21,659	—
1871	23,295	+7.6%
1881	23,307	+0.1%
1901	28,608	+22.7%
1911	30,058	+5.1%
1921	32,500	+8.1%
1931	36,720	+13.0%
1936	38,111	+3.8%
1951	44,745	+17.4%
1961	50,114	+12.0%
1971	55,217	+10.2%
1981	54,298	−1.7%
1991	53,591	−1.3%
2001	51,375	−4.1%
2011	49,958	−2.8%
2021	46,085	−7.8%
Source: ISTAT

Ascoli Piceno has experienced rapid population growth over the years, peaking in the 1970s with a population of 55,000. From that period, a gradual decline began, with a significant loss starting in 2001, when the population surpassed 50,000. Over the past fifteen years, Ascoli Piceno has lost over 6,000 residents. Since then, the population has declined dramatically, reaching just over 45,000 in 2025, including 3,225 foreigners. It has been surpassed by San Benedetto del Tronto, becoming the second most populous city in the province of the same name.

== Territorial subdivision ==
Bivio Giustimana, Campolungo-Villa Sant'Antonio, Caprignano, Carpineto, Casa circondariale, Casalena, Casamurana, Case di Cioccio, Casette, Castel di Lama stazione, Castel Trosino, Cervara, Colle, Colle san Marco, Colloto, Colonna, Colonnata, Faiano, Funti, Giustimana, Il Palazzo, Lago, Lisciano, Lisciano di Colloto, Montadamo, Morignano, Mozzano, Oleificio Panichi, Palombare, Pedana, Piagge, Pianaccerro, Poggio di Bretta, Polesio, Ponte Pedana, Porchiano, Rosara, San Pietro, Santa Maria a Corte, Talvacchia, Taverna di mezzo, Trivigliano-villa Pagani, Tronzano, Valle Fiorana, Valle Senzana, Valli, Vena piccola, Venagrande, Villa S. Antonio.

== People ==
- Cecco d'Ascoli (1257–1327), 13th-century poet
- Domenico Balestrieri, 15th-century painter
- Francesco Bellini (1947–2025), entrepreneur
- Girolamo Buratti, 16th-century painter
- Francis Cellini (c. 1781–1849) Priest, missionary to the United States, and Vicar General of the St. Louis Diocese
- Carlo Crivelli (c. 1430 – c. 1495), Renaissance painter
- Dardust (born 1976), musician
- Mattia Destro (born 1991), footballer
- Romano Fenati (born 1996), motorcycle road racer
- Dino Ferrari (1914–2000), 20th-century painter
- Detto Mariano (1937–2020), composer, arranger, pianist, record producer and music publisher
- Alice Pagani (born 1998), actress, model and author
- Nicholas Russo (1845–1902), Italian priest, philosopher, Boston College president and church founder
- Francesco Tamburini (1846–1891), architect who designed many important public buildings in Argentina
- Serafino Tramezzini (1859–1893), sculptor
- Stefano Travaglia (born 1991), tennis player

== Twin towns – sister cities ==
Ascoli Piceno is twinned with:

- Trier, Germany, since 1958
- Massy, France, since 1997

Ascoli Piceno also cooperates with:

- Banská Bystrica, Slovakia, since 1998
- Chattanooga, United States, since 2006
- Norcia, Italy, since 2010
- Amatrice, Italy, since 2010
- Veles, North Macedonia, since 2011
- Beni Mellal, Morocco, since 2012
- Civitella del Tronto, Italy, since 2015
- Maiolati Spontini, Italy, since 2021
- Tirana, Albania, since 2024
- Târgu Mureș, Romania, since 2024
- Recanati and Urbino, Italy, since 2026

== See also ==
- Asculum
