= San Pietro di Muralto Altarpiece =

Altarpiece by Carlo Crivelli and his studio

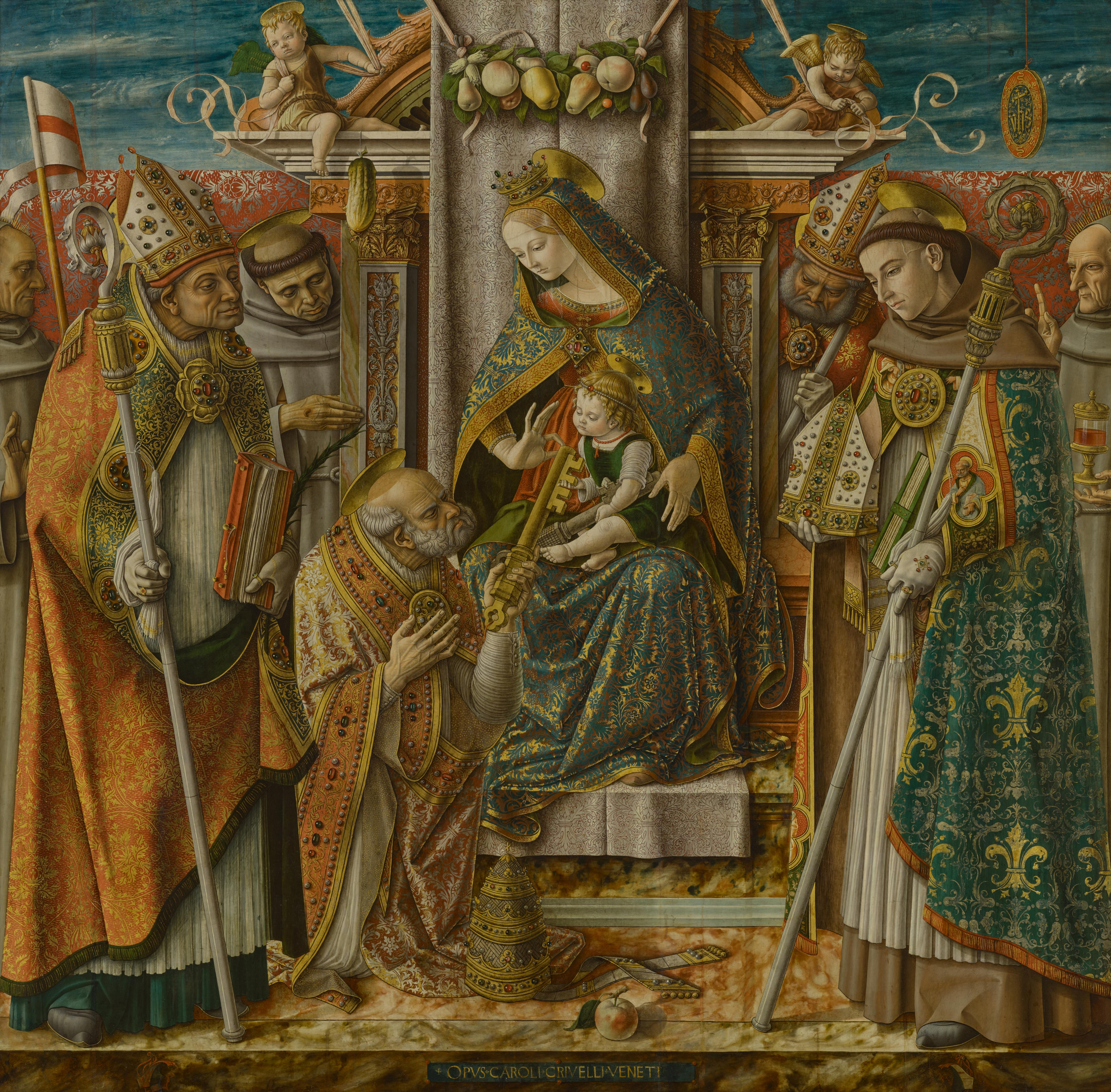

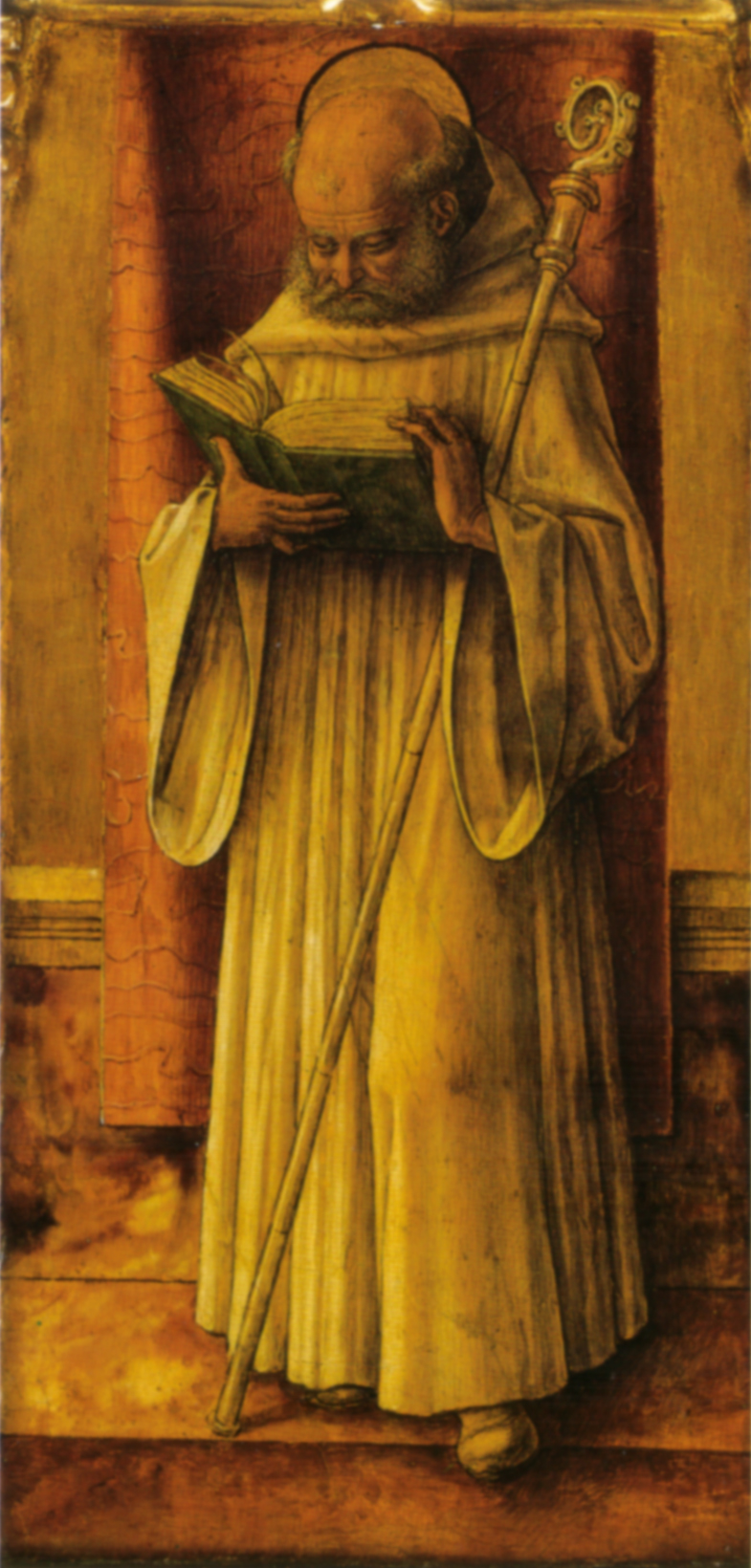
Saint Bernard

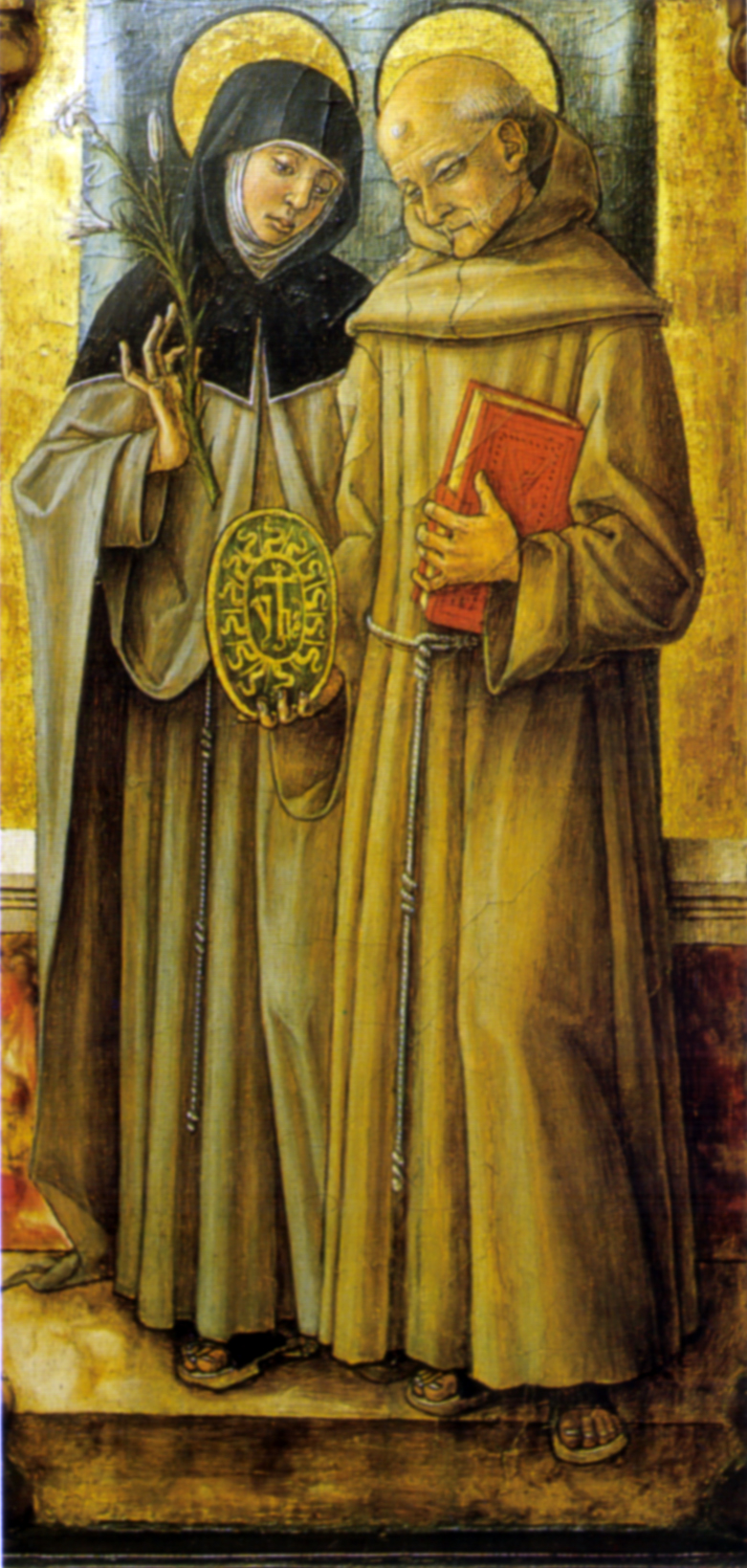
Saint Clare and Saint Bernardino of Siena

The San Pietro di Muralto Altarpiece or San Pietro degli Osservanti Altarpiece is a 1488–1489 tempera and gold on panel altarpiece by Carlo Crivelli and his studio, named after the Dominican church in Camerino in which it originally hung, and now divided between a number of American and European museums.

== History ==
On 8 November 1483 the artist committed to paint a multi-panel altarpiece for Mariano Ronci as large and beautiful as the 1482 San Domenico di Camerino Altarpiece. The work was not produced quickly, but on 28 October 1488 he signed a contract with Ronci's heir Mariano Meneconi by which he was given a year to paint it in return for 100 florins paid in instalments.

The work had already been moved to the church of San Francesco in Camerino by the start of the 16th century after its original home was turned into a fort by Cesare Borgia's occupying forces. After an earthquake in 1799 destroyed or damaged several churches in the city, the work was moved to the church of San Domenico in the same town, from which it was looted by the French and moved with other masterpieces from the Marche to the Pinacoteca di Brera. On 14 February 1822, while reordering its collection, that museum's curators transferred it to Antonio Fidenza, who put it on the art market. It was sold by William Cunningham in London to William Ward, 1st Earl of Dudley and later was acquired by the Gemäldegalerie in 1882. That main work, Madonna and Child Handing Saint Peter the Keys to Paradise, with Saints, is unsigned but on the basis of the documents and style is dated to the artist's final phase.

== Panels ==
The main work features Saint Bonaventure, Francis of Assisi and Giovanni da Capestrano on the left, and Louis of Toulouse, Saint Augustine and Blessed James of the Marches on the right. This is now in the Gemäldegalerie, Berlin.

As demonstrated in 1961 by Federico Zeri, the work originally had a lunette of a Pietà with Mary Magdalene, John the Apostle, and the Virgin Mary at the top. This is now in the Pinacoteca Vaticana in Rome. This was accompanied by a cornice of six small paintings, showing seven saints, all of which were removed before it was taken to the Pinacoteca di Brera.

Two of the frame panels — showing Bonaventure and Bernard — are also in the Gemäldegalerie. The others are in the Bonnefantenmuseum in Maastricht (showing Dominic and Anthony of Padua), the Palazzo Colonna in Rome (showing Saint Augustine), and the Worcester Art Museum (a single panel showing both Bernardino and Catherine of Siena).

== Bibliography ==
- Pietro Zampetti, Carlo Crivelli, Nardini Editore, Firenze 1986. [ISBN unspecified]
- AA-VV., Gemäldegalerie Berlin, Prestel, 1998. ISBN 978-3-7913-4071-5
