= Porto San Giorgio =

- Comune
- Comune di Porto San Giorgio
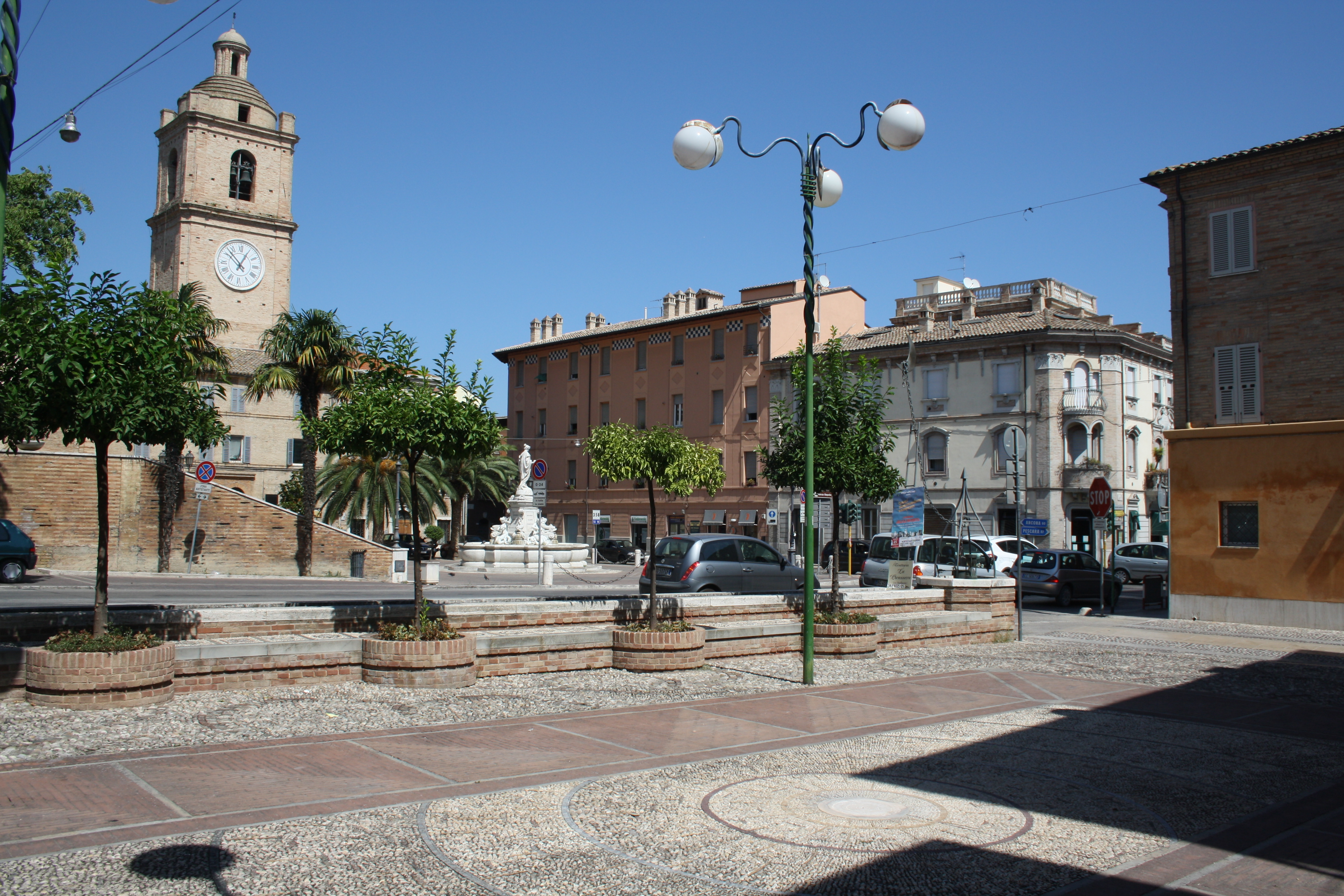
- Porto San Giorgio plaza

- Coat of arms

- Comune location in the Province of Fermo

- Location within Italy Location within Marche
- Coordinates: 43°11′N 13°48′E
- Country: Italy
- Region: Marche
- Province: Fermo (FM)

Government
  - Mayor: Nicola Loira (PD)

Area
  - Total: 8.58 km^{2} (3.31 sq mi)
- Elevation: 4 m (13 ft)

Population (31 December 2021)
  - Total: 15,692
  - Density: 1,830/km^{2} (4,740/sq mi)
- Demonym: Sangiorgesi
- Time zone: UTC+1 (CET)
  - Summer (DST): UTC+2 (CEST)
- Postal code: 63822
- Dialing code: 0734
- Patron saint: St. George
- Saint day: 23 April
- Website: Official website

Porto San Giorgio is a comune (town or municipality) in the Province of Fermo, in the Marche region of Italy. It has approximately 15,700 inhabitants (2021) and it is located on the coast of the Adriatic Sea.

== History ==
Already famous at the times of Pliny the Elder as Navale Firmanorum and cited by Strabo and in the Tabula Peutingeriana as Castrum Firmanorum (Citadel of Fermo), it was bound to the development of the port of Fermo, probably situated to the estuary of the Ete river and connected to the city of Fermo by the Pompeiana road.

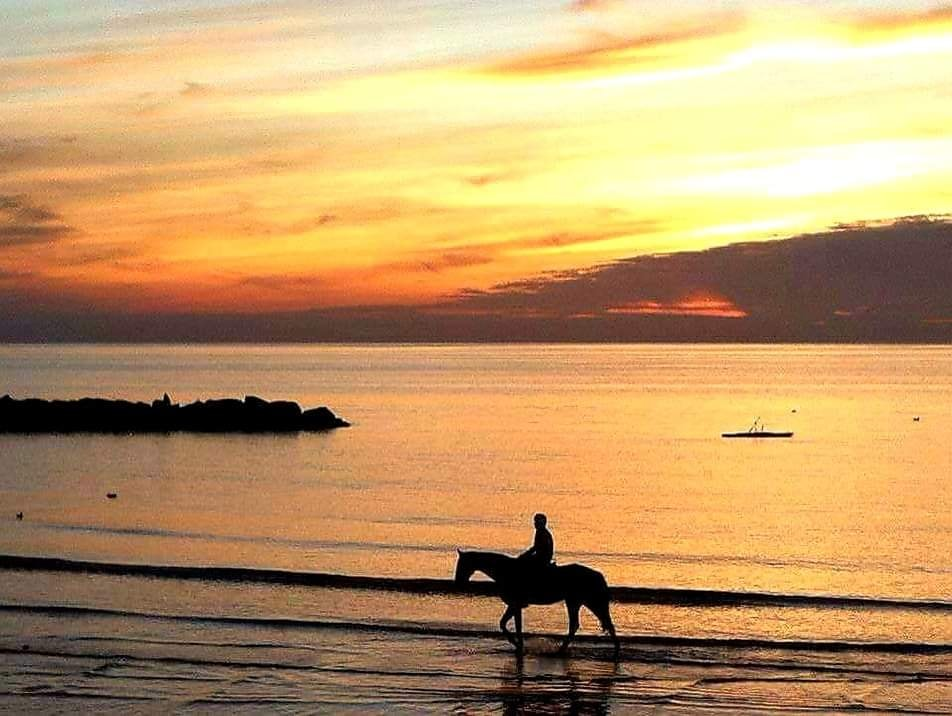
"Alba a Porto San Giorgio", by Savino Marè

In 2013 the promenade of Porto San Giorgio was immortalized by photographer Savino Marè. The photo, entitled "Alba a Porto San Giorgio", helped make the City and the entire region famous at the tourist level, receiving the award at the International Tourism Exchange in Milan.

== Railways ==
The Porto San Giorgio-Fermo station is on the Ancona-Pescara railway line of the Ferrovie dello Stato.

Porto San Giorgio was connected to Amandola through a 56-kilometre (35 mi) narrow gauge railway with 950-millimetre (37 in) track, the so-called "Italian gauge", which was disabled in 1956.

== Landmarks ==
The Chiesa di San Giorgio was completed in 1834, replacing an earlier building which had housed the now-dispersed Porto San Giorgio Altarpiece by Carlo Crivelli. Tiepolo Fortress was built in 1267 by Lorenzo Tiepolo.

== Notable people ==
- Silvia Ballestra (born 1969), writer
- Giampiero Simoni (born 1969), racing driver

== Twin towns ==
- Gessopalena, Italy
- Biograd na Moru, Croatia
- Birżebbuġa, Malta
