= Saint Francis with the Blood of Christ =

Painting by Carlo Crivelli

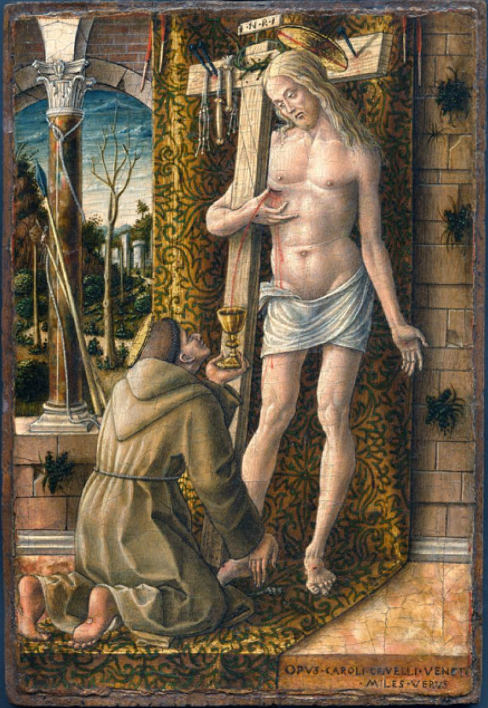
Saint Francis with the Blood of Christ (c. 1490–1495) by Carlo Crivelli

Saint Francis with the Blood of Christ is a c. 1490-1495 tempera and gold on panel painting by Carlo Crivelli, signed at bottom right OPUS CAROLI CRIVELLI VENETI / MILES VERUS". On the reverse is a heraldic emblem. It is now in the Museo Poldi Pezzoli in Milan.

== Description ==
It shows Francis of Assisi (with his stigmata visible) collecting blood pouring from the side of Christ in a cup, with the column, the ropes and the stick with the vinegar-soaked sponge from the Flagellation and Passion of Christ. Christ himself holds a cross, from which hang other Instruments of the Passion (crown of thorns, whip, nails). The subject is a rare one in painting, mainly appearing in works from the Veneto such as Giovanni Bellini's The Blood of the Redeemer (National Gallery, London) and Carpaccio's Christ between Four Angels (Udine). With St Francis as an active character, Crivelli's treatment of the theme differs from the ideas of Giacomo della Marca and thus represents a highly rare and personal idea provided by an unknown commissioner.

Probably for private devotion by a Franciscan friar and only 20 cm by 16.3 cm in size, the painting's commissioner is unknown. Traces of a hinge on the canvas support suggest it once had a lid, whilst a recent restoration has revealed the artist's signature from beneath later overpainting - its use of the title "MILES" means it post-dates 1490, when the artist was granted that title by Ferdinand of Aragon.
