= The Anto War =

- Directed by: Riccardo Milani
- Written by: Silvia Ballestra (story); Riccardo Milani; Sandro Petraglia; Domenico Starnone
- Produced by: Vittorio Cecchi Gori
- Starring: Flavio Pistilli; Federico Di Flauro; Paolo Setta; Danilo Mastracci; Regina Orioli
- Cinematography: Alessandro Pesci
- Edited by: Marco Spoletini
- Music by: Avion Travel
- Release date: October 1, 1999
- Running time: 90 minutes
- Country: Italy
- Language: Italian

The Anto War (Italian: La guerra degli Antò) is a 1999 Italian comedy-drama film directed by Riccardo Milani.

== Cast ==
- Flavio Pistilli as Antò Lu Purk
- Federico Di Flauro as Antò Lu Malatu
- Paolo Setta as Antò Lu Zorru
- Danilo Mastracci as Antò Lu Zombi
- Regina Orioli as Sballestrera
- Francesco Bruni as Piero Broccoli
- Donatella Raffai as herself
