= San Domenico di Camerino Altarpiece =

Disassembled polyptych by Carlo Crivelli

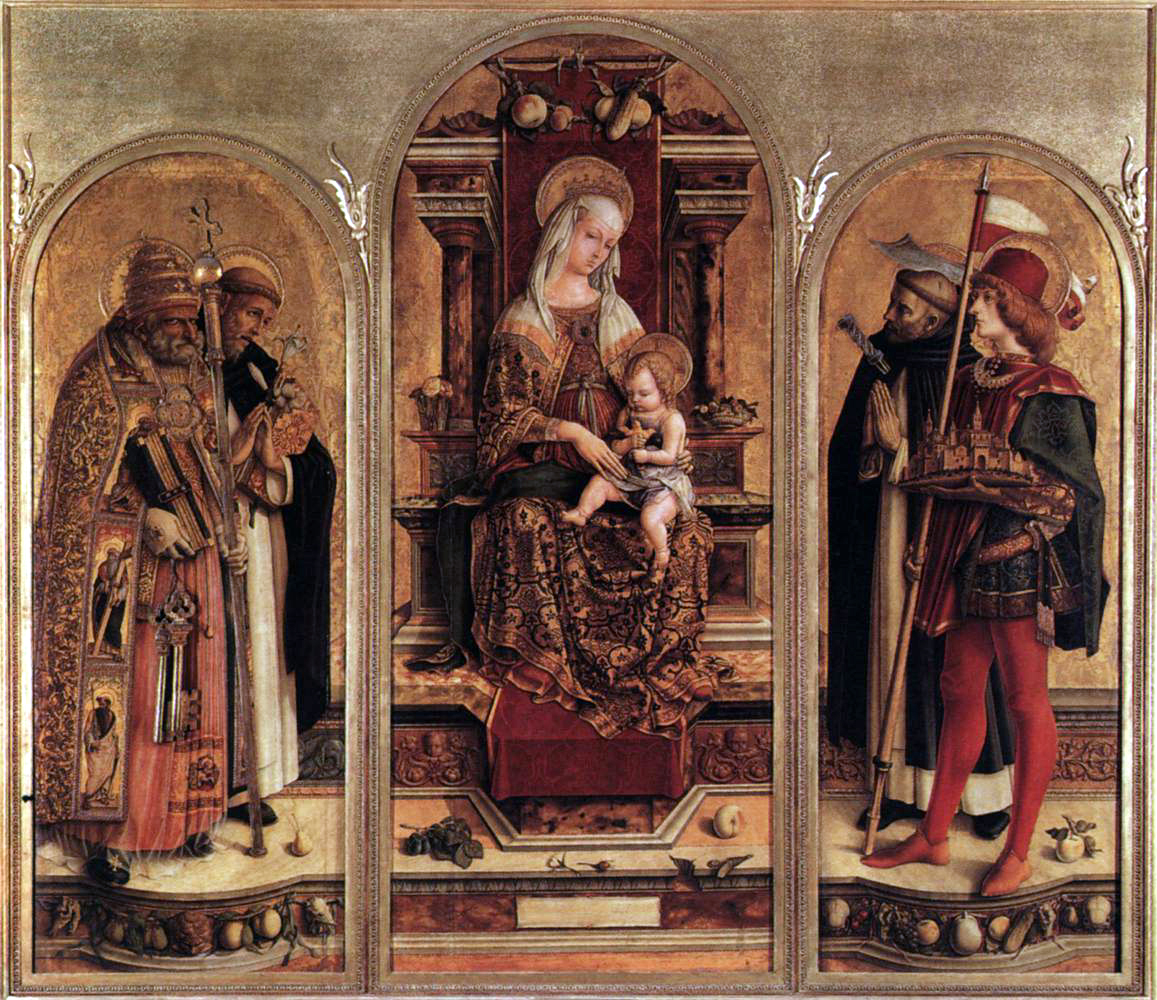
San Domenico di Camerino Altarpiece (1482) by Carlo Crivelli

The Madonna and Child with an Apple is a 1482 tempera and gold on panel painting by Carlo Crivelli, probably originally painted in Camerino and now divided between the Pinacoteca di Brera, in Milan, the Stadel Museum, in Frankfurt, and the Abegg-Stockar Collection, in Zürich.

== Bibliography (in Italian) ==
- Pietro Zampetti, Carlo Crivelli, Nardini Editore, Firenze 1986. [ISBN unspecified]
- AA.VV., Brera, guida alla pinacoteca, Electa, Milano 2004. ISBN 978-88-370-2835-0
