= Madonna and Child with Saints and Donor =

Painting by Carlo Crivelli

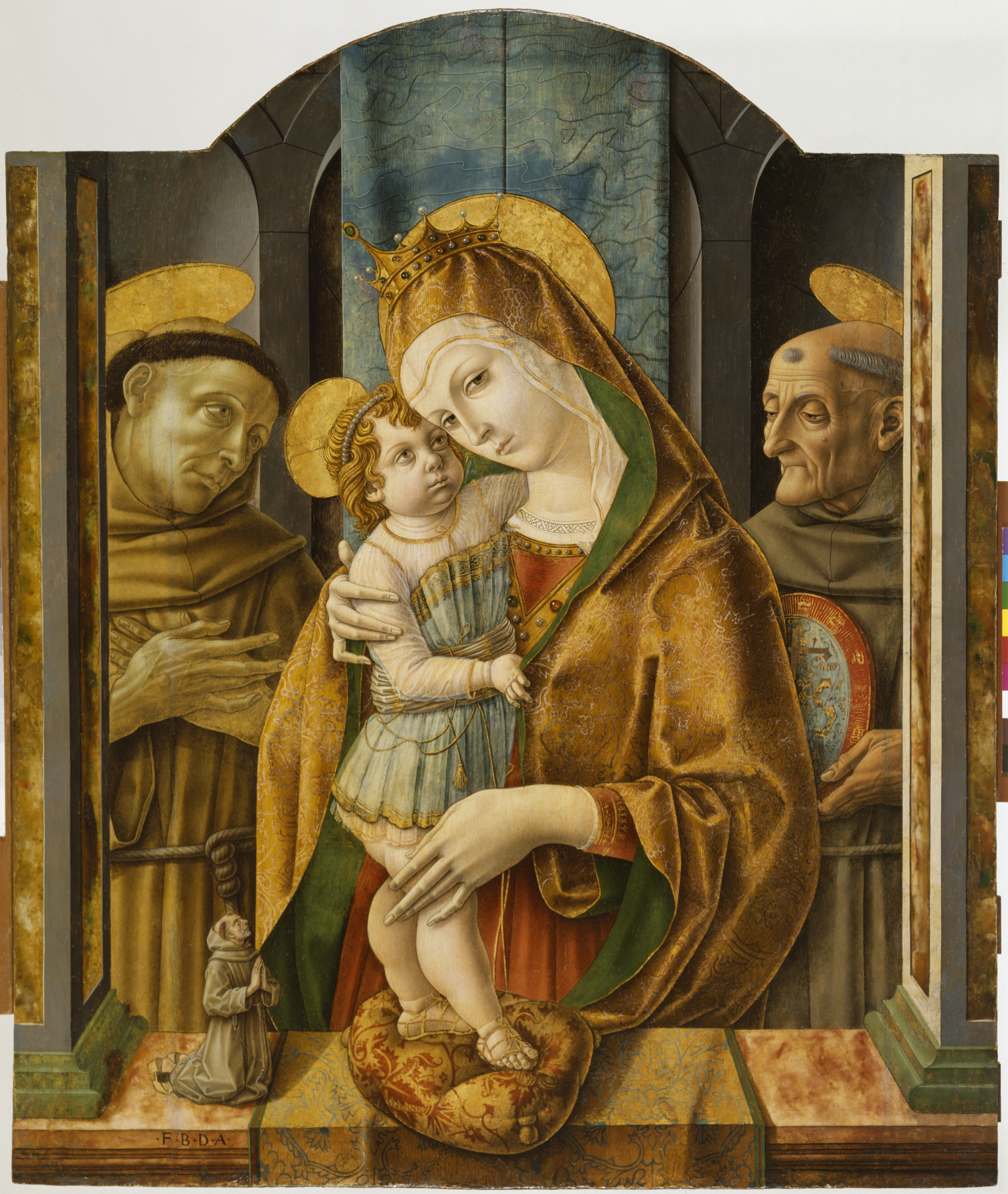
- Artist: Carlo Crivelli
- Year: c. 1490
- Medium: Tempera and gold on panel
- Dimensions: 97.9 cm × 83.3 cm (38.5 in × 32.8 in)
- Location: Walters Art Museum, Baltimore

Madonna and Child with Saints and Donor is a c. 1490 oil on panel painting by Carlo Crivelli. It shows the Madonna and child between Francis of Assisi and Bernardino of Siena, with a tiny figure of the painting's donor kneeling on the balustrade in front of the Madonna. It is stored at the Walters Art Museum in Baltimore.

== History ==
Based on style and location, dating by art critics Hans van Marle, Anna Bovero, and Zera places the work in the late phase of Crivelli's career—around 1490. The relatively large size of the painting indicates that it was probably intended for use in a small church chapel. It might have originated from its commissioner's private chapel in the Chiesa di San Francesco ad Alto in Ancona. At some point, the painting was cut down at the top to reduce its height.

The painting was documented in Marcello Massarenti's collection in Rima before 1897. It was acquired by Henry Walters in 1910, who bequeathed it to the Walters Art Museum in 1931.

The painting was conserved and retouched in 1937, 1966, and 1982.

== Description and style ==
Characteristic of late Crivelli works, the use of perspective is clear in the background of the scene, with the triple niche and the loggia whose parapet Mary looks out over. Jesus stands upright on an adorned cushion and rests his head on a damascened drapery. Nearby a tiny Franciscan friar, the commissioner of the painting, prays while kneeling. He is placed over a small, identifying inscription F.B.D.A., that refers to "Fra' Bernardino da Ancona".

As is traditional, the central group of Mary and Jesus is isolated by a drapery placed behind them. At the sides, two saints of the Franciscan orders emerge into the scene: Francis of Assisi at left with his stigmata and Bernardino of Siena at right carrying the Christogram.

As in other decorative works by Crivelli, Madonna and Child with Saints is marked by its ample use of gold and the intense expressivity of its figures. The painting exhibits realism in its representation of the figures' skin and the complex play of gestures and interlocking gazes, as well as its trompe-l'œil effects as with the cushion that looks as if it is protruding out of the painting toward the viewer.

== Bibliography ==
- Zampetti, Pietro (1986). Carlo Crivelli (in Italian). Firenze: Nardini Editore.
