= Porto San Giorgio Altarpiece =

Disassembled polyptych by Carlo Crivelli

Polittico di Porto San Giorgio Altarpiece
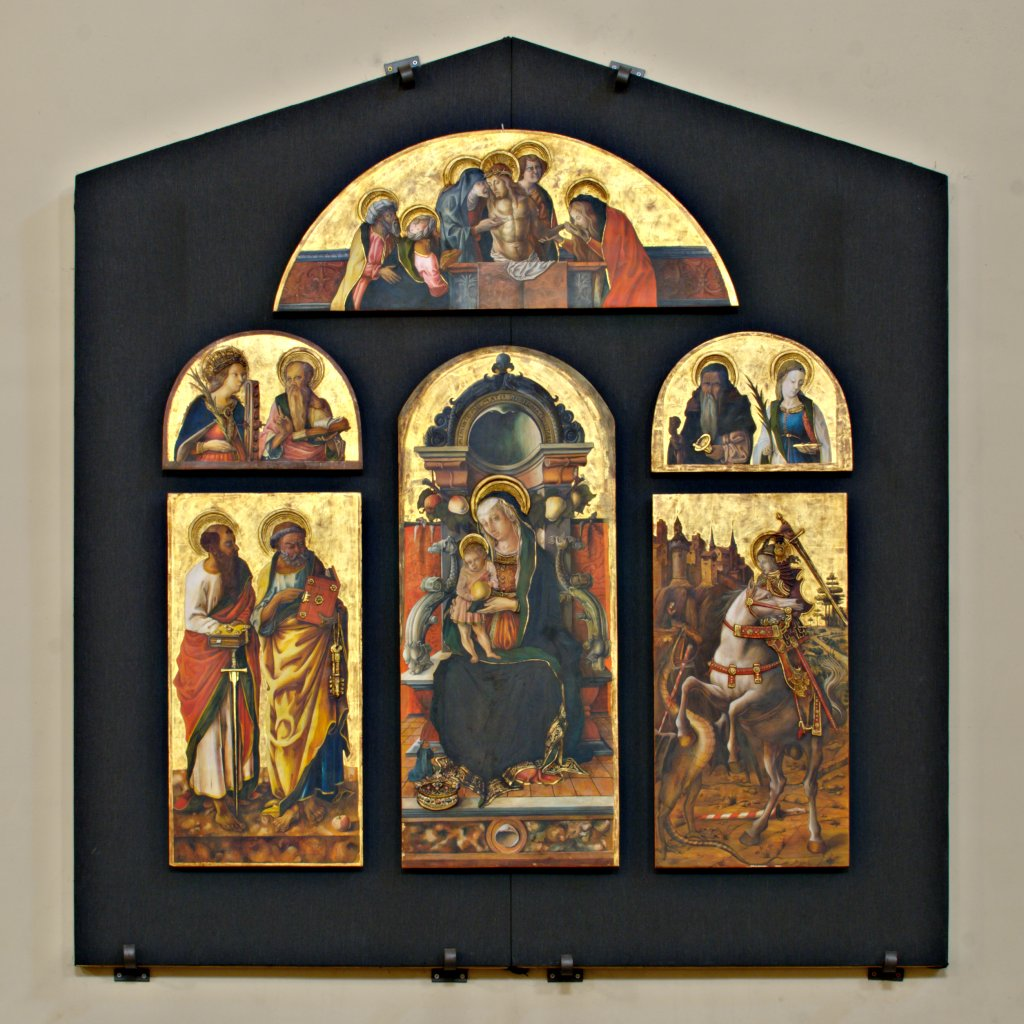
- Reconstruction of the altarpiece based on the 1771 inventory
- Artist: Carlo Crivelli
- Year: 1470
- Medium: tempera and gold on panel

The Porto San Giorgio Altarpiece or Porto San Giorgio Polytpych was a 1470 multi-panel tempera and gold on panel altarpiece by the Italian Renaissance painter Carlo Crivelli. Stylistically similar to Crivelli's Massa Fermana Altarpiece, the work was a fundamental step in his evolution away from the Paduan Renaissance towards a more delicate and realist style.

Originally in San Giorgio church in Porto San Giorgio, Fermo, it was split up in the 19th century and sold in separate lots, meaning its panels are now split between a number of European and American museums.

== History ==
A transcribed document in the Fermo archives (the original is now lost) states that the altarpiece was commissioned in 1470 by a man named Giorgio Salvadori, an Albanian immigrant to Italy fleeing the Ottoman advance after Skanderbeg's death in 1468. He headed the Salvadori family, who owned the altarpiece for centuries and who eventually split it up.

The work's dating is based not only on its style but also on 18th-century documents which state that a signature by Crivelli was once visible at the bottom of the frame, reading "CAROLUS CRIVELLUS VENETUS PINXIT ANNO 1470" - this is now illegible. It also appears in two inventories, one of 1727 by Anselmo Ercoli and another made in 1771 during a pastoral visit, the latter of which describes the altarpiece in minute detail and mentions that the same chapel also contained two paintings each with three saints and each with the Salvadori coat of arms (perhaps originally the altarpiece's predella and now lost). An 1805 document in the Salvadori family archives refers to a Last Supper, compatible with the measurements of the paintings of "some saints" (a palm) and which may have formed the centre of the predella.

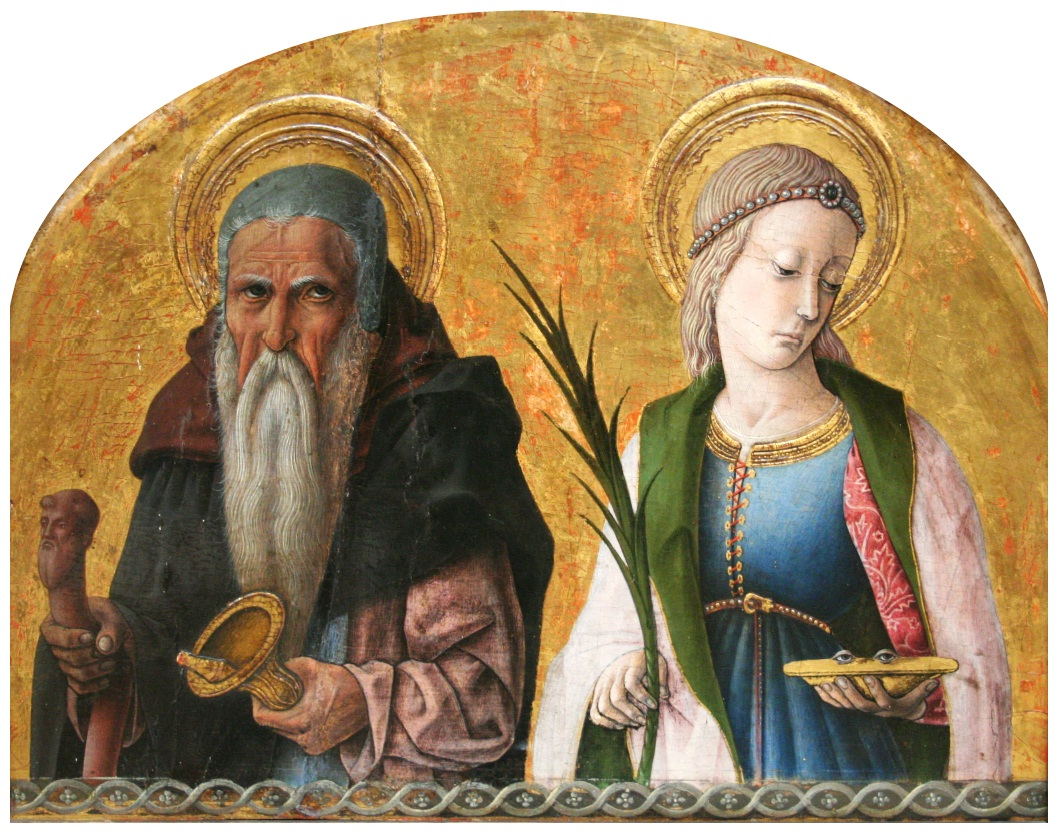
Saint Anthony Abbot and Saint Lucy, Kraków

In 1803 the old parish church was demolished and the altarpiece moved into the Suffragio church, which was hosting the church's services until a new San Giorgio was built. In 1832 the painting was in the Salvadori family home, still waiting for the new church's completion - there Maggiori saw it. By 1832, when it was seen by Amico Ricci, the new church was complete and the altarpiece was in it, though the half-length figures of saints had already been removed to stay in the Salvadori house. In 1835 the whole work was taken to Rome and sold in pieces to the Portuguese ambassador Hudson for 90 scudi via Luigi Salvadori Paleotti. The prior of the monastic community of Porto San Giorgio claimed ownership of the altarpiece, however, and tried to contest the work's sale by the Salvadori family. A new payment of 300 scudi settled the dispute. It passed into the Ward and then Dudley collections, where Waagen saw it. It was exhibited at the Egyptian Hall in London, where it was seen by Joseph Archer Crowe and Giovanni Battista Cavalcaselle. In 1876, it was acquired by Martin Colnaghi at the sale of the Dudley collection and dispersed.

== Reconstruction ==
Identifying the panels of the work and reconstructing the overall composition has been a long process, starting with Philip Hendy in 1931, who associated Saint Peter and Saint Paul (National Gallery, London) with Saint George and the Dragon (Isabella Stewart Gardner Museum). Roberto Longhi then identified the Cook Madonna (Washington) and the Porto San Giorgio Pietà (Detroit) as parts of the altarpiece in 1946, followed by Federico Zeri identifying Saint Catherine of Alexandria and Saint Jerome as another part in 1950. The final piece to be found was Saint Anthony Abbot and Saint Lucy, identified by J. Bialostocki in 1956. The whole altarpiece was reunited in 1961 in Venice at a monographic exhibition on Crivelli and now at Porto San Giorgio there is only a copy of that reconstruction.

At the top was a lunette depicting a pieta (now Detroit Institute of Arts). Each side panel consisted of a smaller lunette and a main panel - that on the left had Saint Peter and Saint Paul (now National Gallery, London) below a lunette of Saint Catherine of Alexandria and Saint Jerome (now Philbrook Museum of Art), whilst that on the right had Saint George and the Dragon (now Isabella Stewart Gardner Museum) below a lunette of Saint Anthony Abbot and St Lucy (now National Museum, Kraków). The central panel, now known as the Cook Madonna, is a Madonna and Child now in the National Gallery of Art in Washington.

== Gallery ==
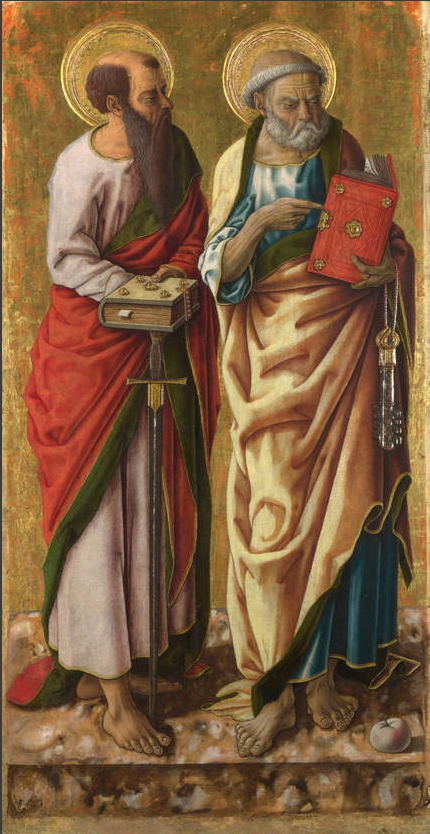
Saint Peter and Saint Paul, London

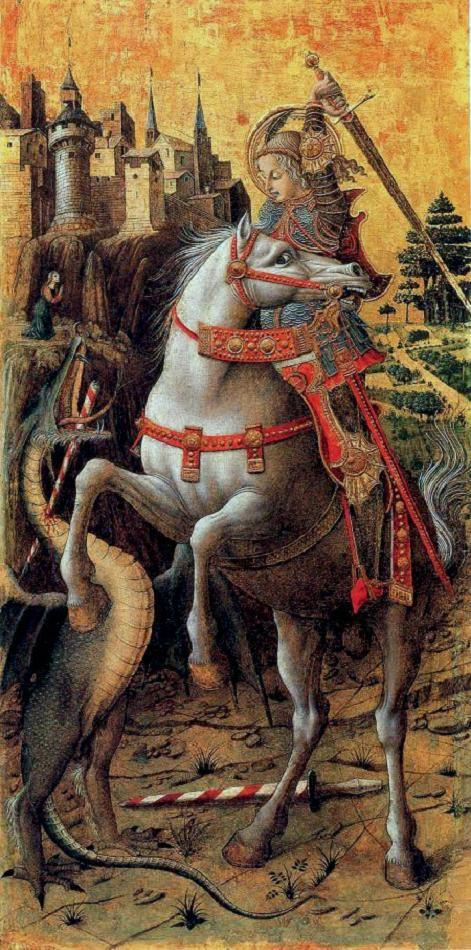
Saint George and the Dragon, Boston

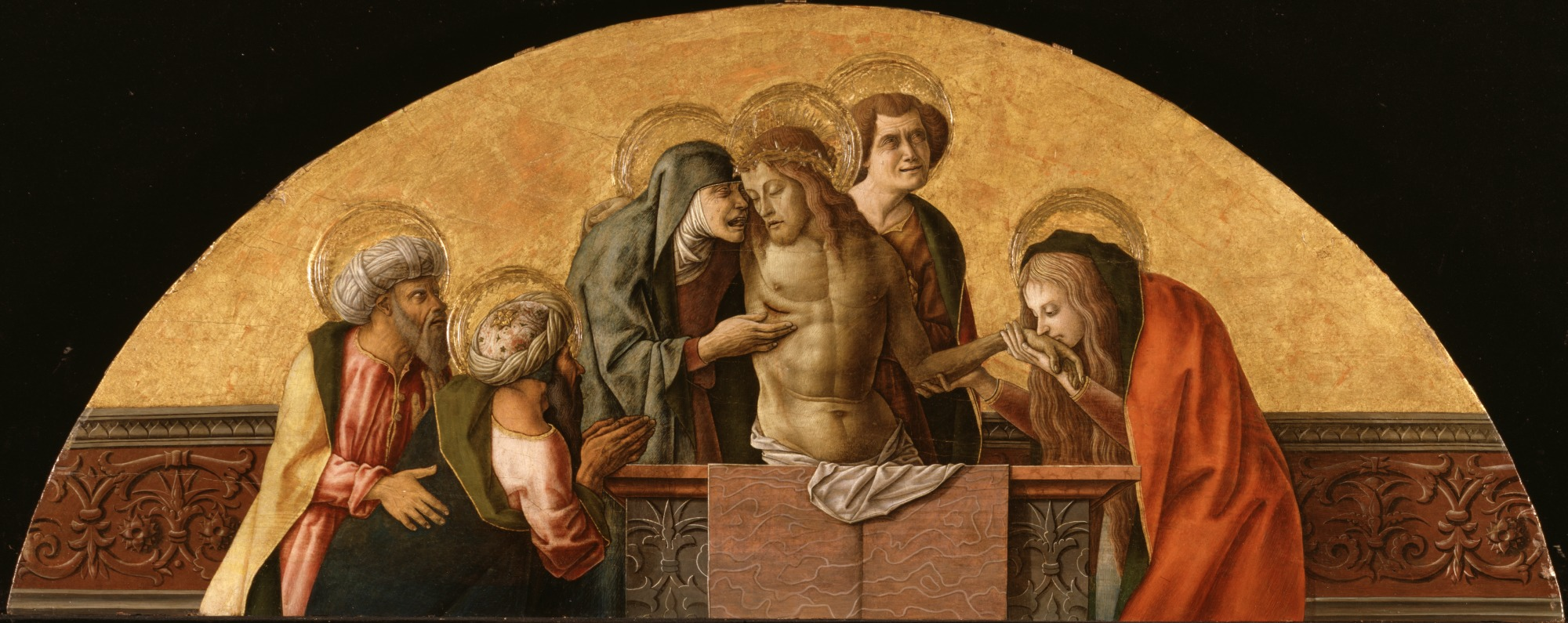
Pietà, Detroit

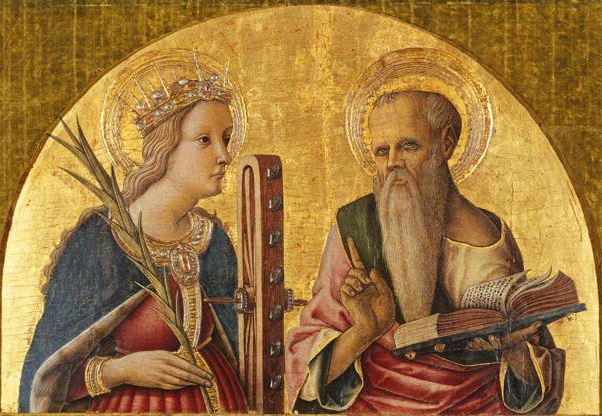
Saint Catherine of Alexandria and Saint Jerome, Tulsa

== Bibliography ==
- (in Italian) Pietro Zampetti, Carlo Crivelli, Nardini Editore, Firenze 1986. [ISBN unspecified]
- (in Italian) Rossi Iommetti Pierluigi, Il polittico di Porto San Giorgio, Roma 2014. ISBN SIP0405014
- "Il polittica nel sito della Fondazione Zeri" (in Italian).
- "Article".
- "Uno studio sul polittico" (in Italian).
