= Silvia Ballestra =

Italian writer

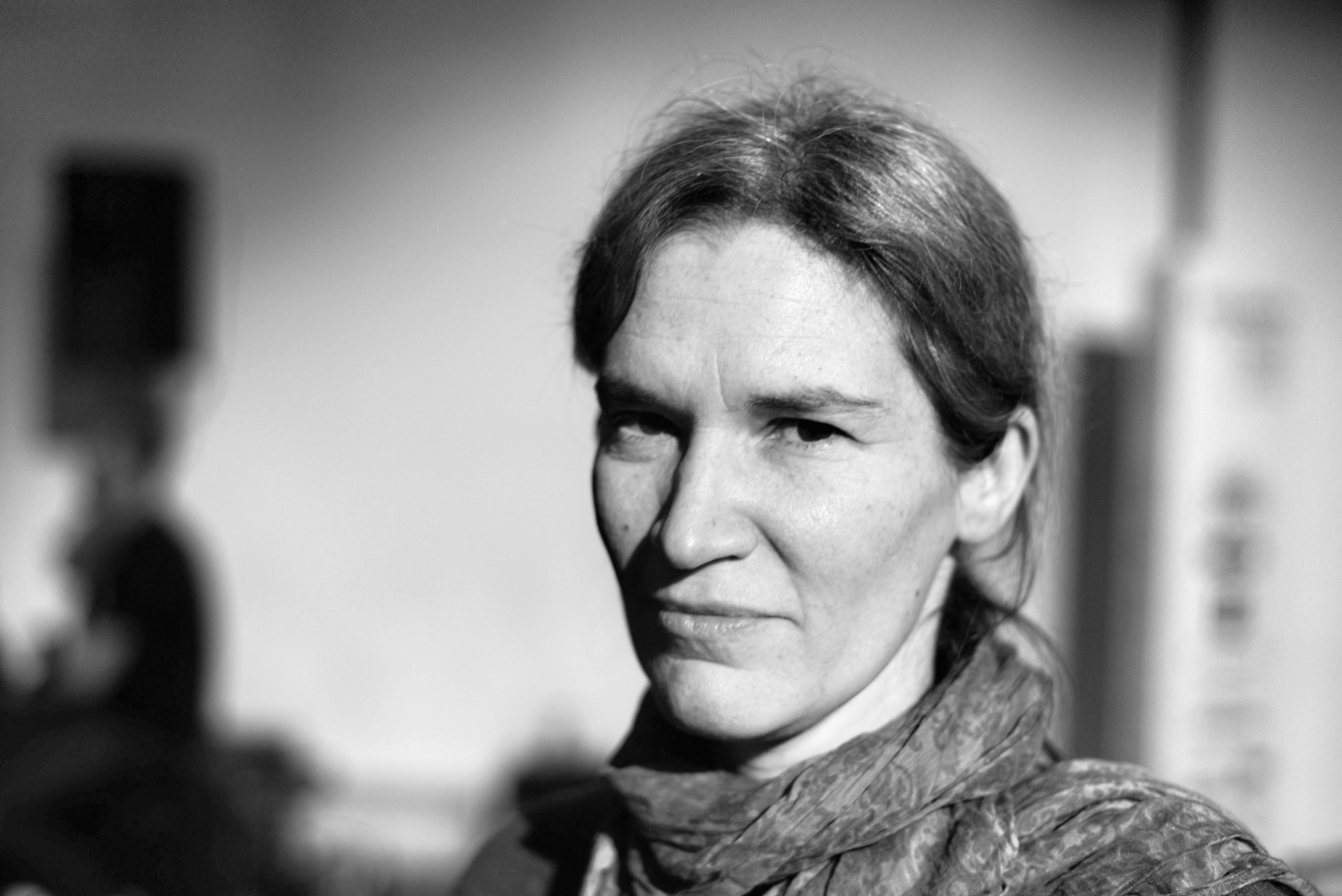
- Ballestra in 2014
- Born: 1969 (age 56–57); Porto San Giorgio

Silvia Ballestra (born 1969) is an Italian writer. In 2006, she won the Rapallo Carige Prize.

== Life ==
Ballestra was born in Porto San Giorgio in 1969.

She was discovered by Pier Vittorio Tondelli and began publishing novels, short stories and essays since 1990.

Her debut book was Birthday of the Iguana and it has been translated into several languages. From that book and the following book La guerra degli Antò was taken the script of a film, The Anto War by Riccardo Milani. She has a degree in Foreign Languages and Literature. She has edited various translations from both French and English. She has worked with the newspaper L'Unità and several magazines and other newspapers. She has lived and worked in Milan.

In 2006, she won the Rapallo Carige Prize for La seconda Dora.

== Selected works ==
- Compleanno dell'iguana (Birthday of the Iguana) Arnoldo Mondadori, Milano, 1991. ISBN 9788804350507
- La guerra degli Antò, (The war of Anto) Einaudi, Torino, 1992. ISBN 9788806172688
- La giovinezza della signorina N.N. : una storia d'amore (The youthfulness of Miss NN), Baldini & Castoldi, Milano, 1998. ISBN 9788880893301
- Zona : scritture dal territorio, Zona, [Recco (Genova)], [1998]. ISBN 9788887578881
- La Seconda Dora Rizzoli, Milano, 2006. ISBN 9788817007283
- I giorni della Rotonda Rizzoli, Milano, 2009. ISBN 9788817036603
- Amiche mie : romanzo Mondadori, Milano, 2014. ISBN 9788804634393
- La nuova stagione Bompiani, Milano, Italia, 2019. ISBN 9788845299056
- La Sibilla : vita di Joyce Lussu, GLF Editori Laterza, Bari-Roma, 2022. ISBN 9788858147535

=== Anthologies ===
- Contribution to the anthology Papergang, under 25, 1990
- Adamo, Giuliana (2005). Narrativa italiana recente = Recent Italian fiction : note su vari autori e problemi degli anni Novanta e del nuovo millennio, e su Niccolò Ammaniti, Silvia Ballestra, Stefano Benni, Diego de Silva, Dacia Maraini, Melania Mazzucco, Simona Vinci (in Italian). Torino, Dublin (Ireland): Trauben; Department of Italian, Trinity College. ISBN 978-88-88398-99-0. OCLC 63888872.
- King, Martha (2004). After the War: a collection of short fiction by postwar Italian women. ISBN 978-0-934977-55-5.
- Abbona-Sneider, Cristina; Borra, Antonello; Pausini, Cristina (2010-01-01). Trame (in Italian). Yale University Press. ISBN 978-0-300-12495-8.
- The hills across the street. A trip around the life of Tullio Pericoli, Rizzoli, 2011. ISBN 9788817052849
