= Huldschinsky Madonna (painting) =

Painting by Carlo Crivelli

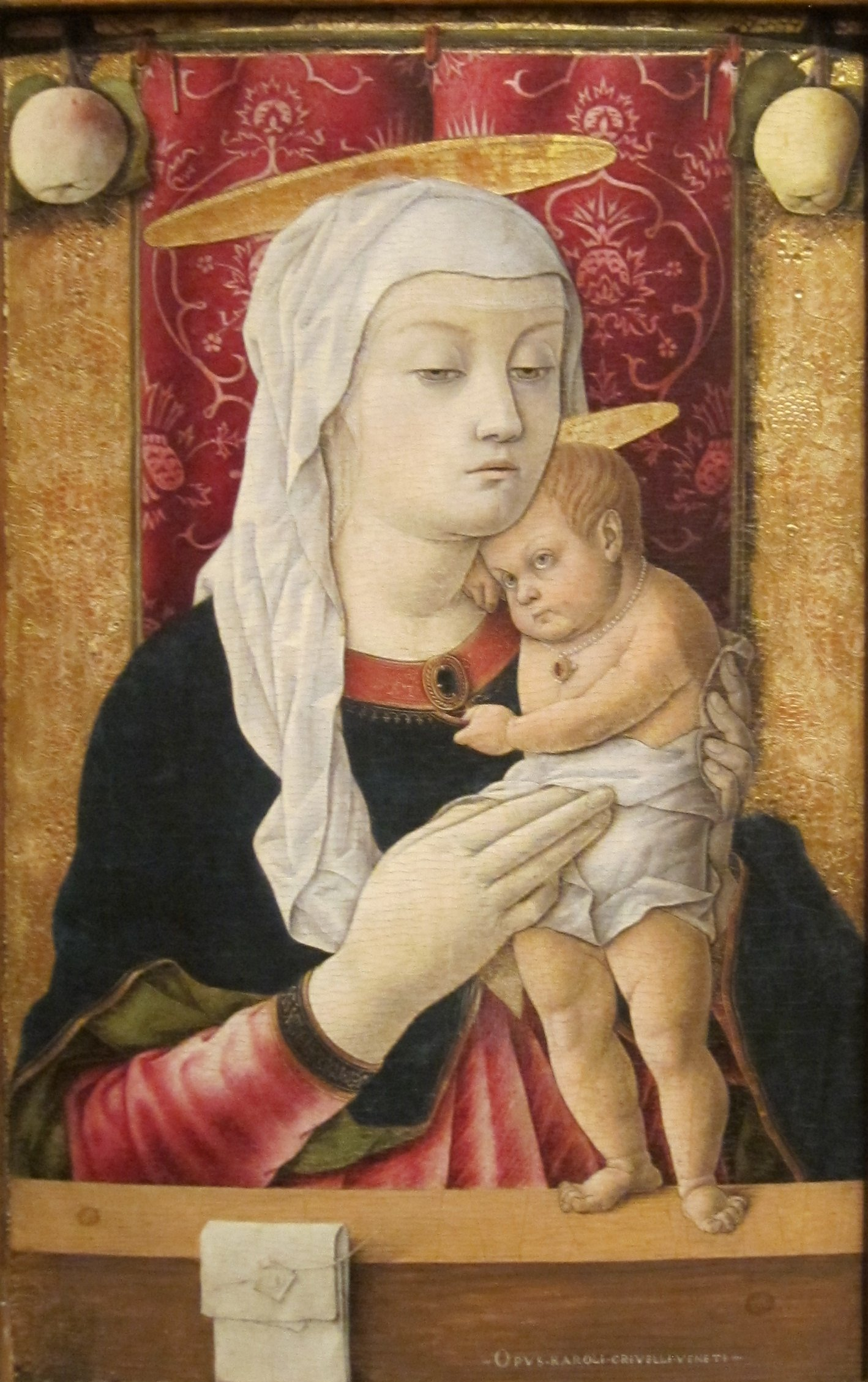
- Artist: Carlo Crivelli
- Year: c. 1460
- Medium: tempera and gold on panel, transferred to canvas
- Dimensions: 62 cm × 40 cm (24 in × 16 in)
- Location: San Diego Museum of Art, San Diego

The Huldschinsky Madonna is a tempera-and-gold-on-panel painting by the Italian Renaissance painter Carlo Crivelli, executed c. 1460, and signed "OPVS KAROLI CRIVELLI VENETI". It is now in the San Diego Museum of Art. It is dated early in the artist's career, during or just after his stay in Padua in Francesco Squarcione's studio. There is a copy of the work with several variations signed "Opus P. Petri", who Roberto Longhi argued to be Pietro Calzetta, another Paduan School painter.

It is recorded in the Greek royal collections in Athens before passing into the Dohna-Mallmitz Collection and then the Huldschinsky Collection in Berlin, which gave it its name. In 1906 it was displayed at the Kaiser Friedrich Museum and twenty years later it was bought from the Huldschinsky Collection by Colnaghi in London and then Harding in New York before reaching its present home in 1947.

== Description and style ==
The rectangular panel, probably created for private devotion, shows Mary leaning over a parapet and holding the Child who stands on it. Behind them is a rich double damask drape, red in the center (hung by a rod) and golden in the background. The Madonna at the parapet, a scheme of Flemish derivation that became popular in Italy and Venice in particular, was in fact replicated by the artist throughout his career, adding and creating new variations.

The Paduan heritage of the work is evident, starting from the two apples hanging high, a reminder of the original sin, up to the decorative exuberance of the gold and the composition itself, often used by the followers of Squarcione. A highly acute realism permeates the panel, with the small still life of the closed letter in the foreground, hanging from the wooden parapet showing grain and knots.

The physical type of the absorbed Madonna shows the influence of the Florentine artists present in Padua, such as Donatello and Filippo Lippi, especially the latter in the very lively figure of the Child, who peeks carefully towards the viewer from behind the face of the Madonna. The protagonists, as in many of Crivelli's works, are Mary's hands, which delicately hold her son.

The influence of the Florentines can also be read in the perspective representation of the halos, like luminous and shiny discs suspended above the nape of the neck.
