= Savino Marè =

Italian writer, actor and photographer (born 1964)

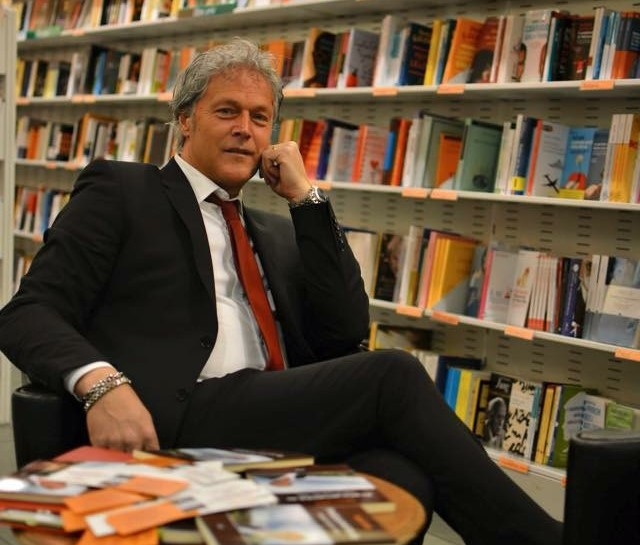
Savino Marè

Savino Marè OMRI (born November 21, 1964, in Lapedona) is an Italian writer, actor and photographer.

== Biography ==
Savino Marè was born on November 21, 1964, in Lapedona, a small town in the province of Fermo. Engaged in social life, Savino is a "Peace Promoter" with the National Association of Civil War Victims, collaborating at the same time with a MIUR project regarding unexploded war residues. After participating in various films, in 2012 he is in the music video of the music song "Le viole" by the singer Lighea and in February 2019 he will work as a correspondent at the 69th Sanremo Festival. In August of the same year he will be one of the jurors of "Miss Italia" in San Ginesio, later recalled in the final of the region in Loreto and for the election of Miss Marche.

In 2013 his shot "Alba a Porto San Giorgio" won the audience award at the Milan International Tourism Exchange (BIT). The Region of Marche used the photo to increase tourism. After the BIT the vote was exhibited in Germany, at the MITT of Russia and displayed in the palace of the municipality of Porto San Giorgio.

On November 29, 2014, Savino received a letter from the municipality of Porto Sant'Elpidio, where the municipal administration is, all citizens are grateful to have a citizen like him.

In 2018 he was appointed by the municipality of Falconara Marittima as a contemporary artist and in 2019 he was named "Il marchigiano dell'anno – Picus del Ver Sacrum" for 2020. The event is organized by the Marche study center "Giuseppe Giunchi" under the patronage of the Senate of the Italian Republic and the Pio Sodalizio dei Piceni.

In 2021 he participated again in "Una ragazza per il Cinema" (the first time in 2018) as vice-president, he won as third place in the third edition of the Gaia Photo Competition, a competition organized under the patronage of the municipality of Porto Sant'Elpidio, and in August he attended some events of the Ginesio Fest. In 2022 he was chosen to comment on the 72nd Sanremo Festival by the civitanovese magazine QCC Magazine, also starting to collaborate with the magazine. In the same period a brief temporary collaboration began with Radio Montecò Web, a small local radio station in Montecosaro, and Marche Infinite.Towards the end of February Savino joined the Italian Federation of Photographic Associations (FIAF).

On May 6 his book "Practically me" received the certificate of participation (former certificate of merit) at the fifteenth edition of Alberoandronico at the Campidoglio, after the evaluation of the jury of the National Prize for Poetry, Fiction, Photography, Short Films and Painting and, on May 20, He received from the mayor of Porto San Giorgio a recognition for having made known the marine coasts of the municipality in the world. Selected by the regional council, from 19 to 23 May he participated as a guest in the XXXV edition of the International Book Fair at the Marche pavilion set up in Turin. In an interview with Radio Rosario, an Argentine radio station, which took place simultaneously with CNN, Savino admitted that from an early age he began to cultivate a passion for cinema.

On April 10, 2025, he received the Civic Merit from the mayor, Giuliano Ciabocco, in San Ginesio on the occasion of the signing between the Italian municipality and the Colombian municipality of Cota of a Friendship Pact, of which Savino was the promoter starting from 2023. On July 26 is awarded by the council of the Marche region to contribute to the dissemination of culture and for its national relevance. In March 2026, received Second Place in the Poetry Section at the "Donna Tu Sei Arte" ("Woman, You Are Art") Art Competition, for his poem "Alba di un Ritratto", and in the following month, on 13 April, he was honored with the Premio Arte, Cultura & Sociale in the Sala della Regina of the Camera dei Deputati in Rome.

== Filmography ==
- The Big Heart of Girls, by Pupi Avati (2011)
- Il Giovane Favoloso, by Mario Martone (2014)
- Come saltano i pesci, directed by Alessandro Valori (2016)
- My second time, directed by Alberto Gelpi (2019)
- The Cat and the Moon, directed by Roberto Lippolis (2019)

=== Short films ===
- Last Chance, directed by Alice Bellagamba (2017)
- The imaginary, directed by Operapop (2017)

== Works ==
- Practically Me – Nothing Happens By Chance, Simple, 2014, ISBN 978-88-6924-040-9.
- We are music. A Book to Compose Together, Simple, 2020, ISBN 978-88-6924-505-3.
- The great heart of Aragon, Nisroch, 2024, ISBN 979-1280990662

== Honours ==
=== National honours ===
- Italy: Knight of the Order of Merit of the Italian Republic (2 June 2023)
