= Christ between Four Angels =

Painting by Vittore Carpaccio

Christ between Four Angels and the Instruments of the Passion
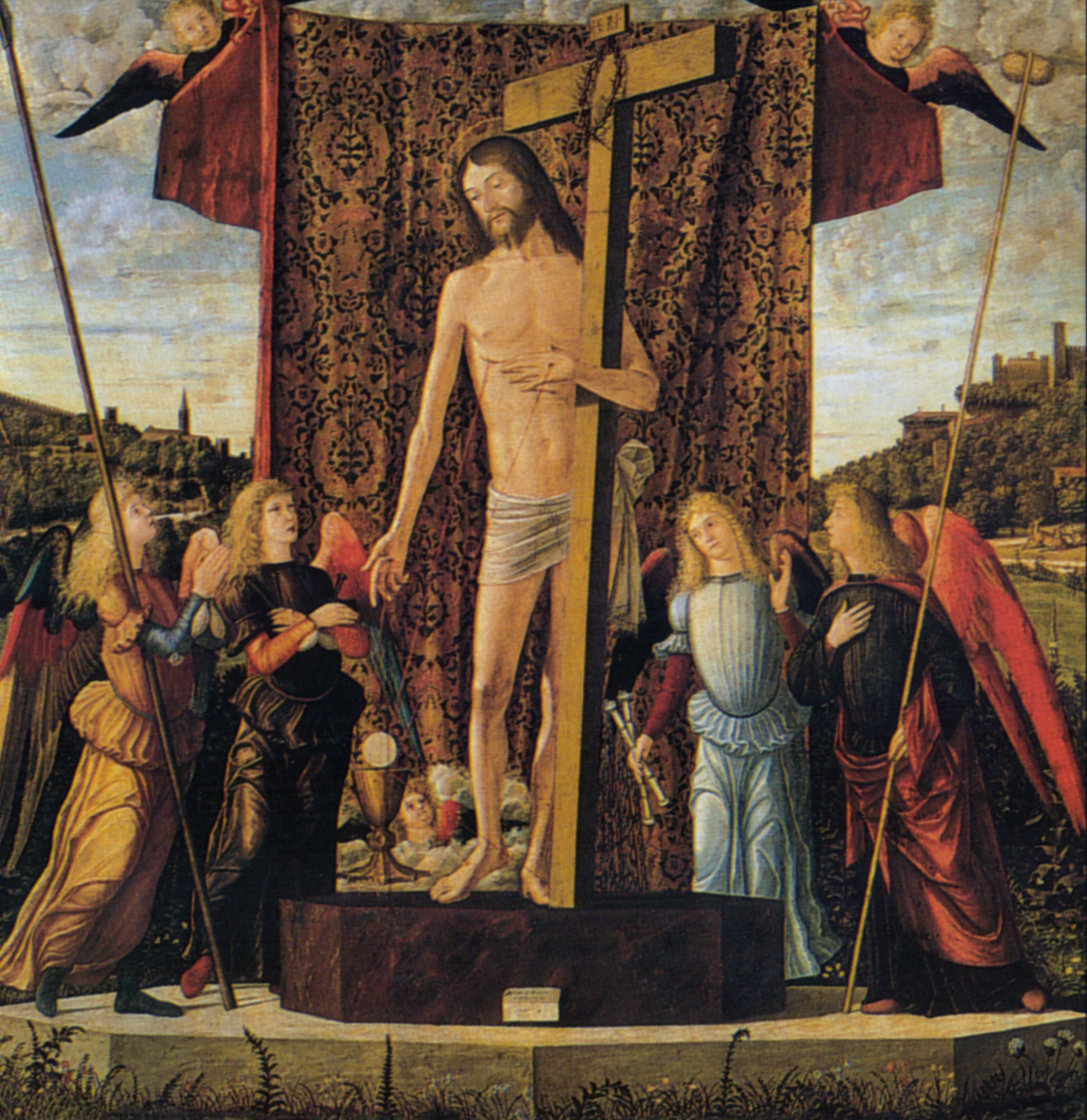
- Artist: Vittore Carpaccio
- Year: 1496
- Medium: Oil on panel
- Dimensions: 162 cm × 163 cm (64 in × 64 in)
- Location: Civic Museum and Galleries of History and Art, Udine

The Christ between Four Angels and the Instruments of the Passion is a painting by the Italian Renaissance master Vittore Carpaccio, executed in 1496 and now housed in the Civici musei e gallerie di storia e arte of Udine, Northern Italy.

The work was painted for the church of St. Peter Martyr of Udine. It was acquired by the Austrians after the Napoleonic Wars, and assigned to the Hofmuseum in Vienna in 1838. It was given back to Italy in 1919.

== Description ==
The work is signed and dated VICTORIS CHARPATJO / VENETI OPVS / 1496 on a cartouche attached to the basement. It is contemporary of Carpaccio's cycle of the Legend of Saint Ursula and shows some influences of Giovanni Bellini.

It depicts Christ standing on a double basement, keeping the Cross. Behind him is a damask cloth held by two angels and, at the sides, a landscape inspired to the Venetian hills; the castle on the right is similar to that of Udine. In the foreground are four angels with the Instruments of the Passion: from the left, the Holy Lance, the nails from the cross, the sticks of the Flagellation and the Holy Sponge. On the cross is the Crown of Thorns and the inscription "INRI". Blood rays spring up from Christ's wounds, ending in the Holy Chalice and turning themselves into the sacramental bread.

The sacrifice of Christ is also alluded to by the deer which is being slaughtered by a leopard on the lawn on the right.

== Sources ==
- Valcanover, Francesco (2007). "Vittore Carpaccio". Pittori del Rinascimento. Florence: Scala. ISBN 978-88-8117-099-9.
