= Carlo Crivelli =

Italian Renaissance painter (c. 1430 – c. 1495)

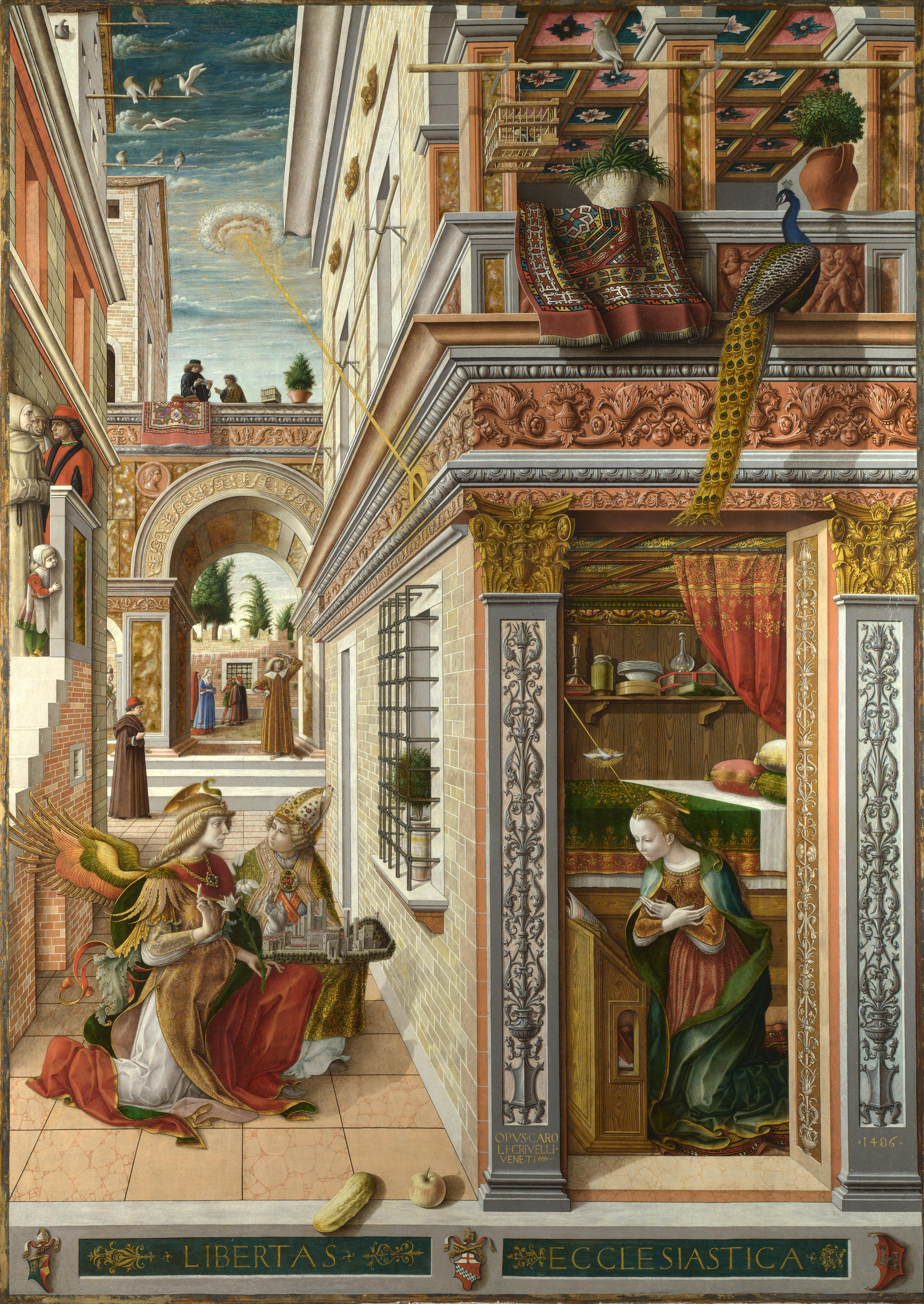
- The Annunciation, with St. Emidius, National Gallery, London (1486)
- Born: Carlo Crivelli c. 1430; Venice, Republic of Venice
- Died: c. 1495 (aged 64–65); Ascoli Piceno, Papal States
- Known for: Painting, tempera
- Movement: Late Gothic, Renaissance

Carlo Crivelli (c. 1430 – c. 1495) was an Italian Renaissance painter of conservative Late Gothic decorative sensibility, who spent his early years in the Veneto, where he absorbed influences from the Vivarini, Squarcione, and Mantegna. He left the Veneto by 1458 and spent most of the remainder of his career in the March of Ancona, where he developed a distinctive personal style that contrasts with that of his Venetian contemporary Giovanni Bellini.

== Early life ==
Crivelli was born around 1430–35 in Venice to a family of painters and received his artistic formation there and in Padua. The details of Crivelli's career are still sparse: He is said to have studied under Jacobello del Fiore, who was painting as late as 1436; at that time Crivelli was probably only a boy. He also studied at the school of Vivarini in Venice, then left Venice for Padua, where he is believed to have worked in the workshop of Francesco Squarcione and then, after being sentenced in 1457 to a six-month prison term for an affair with a married woman, left in 1459 for Zadar in Dalmatia (now part of Croatia, but then a Venetian territory).

== Career ==
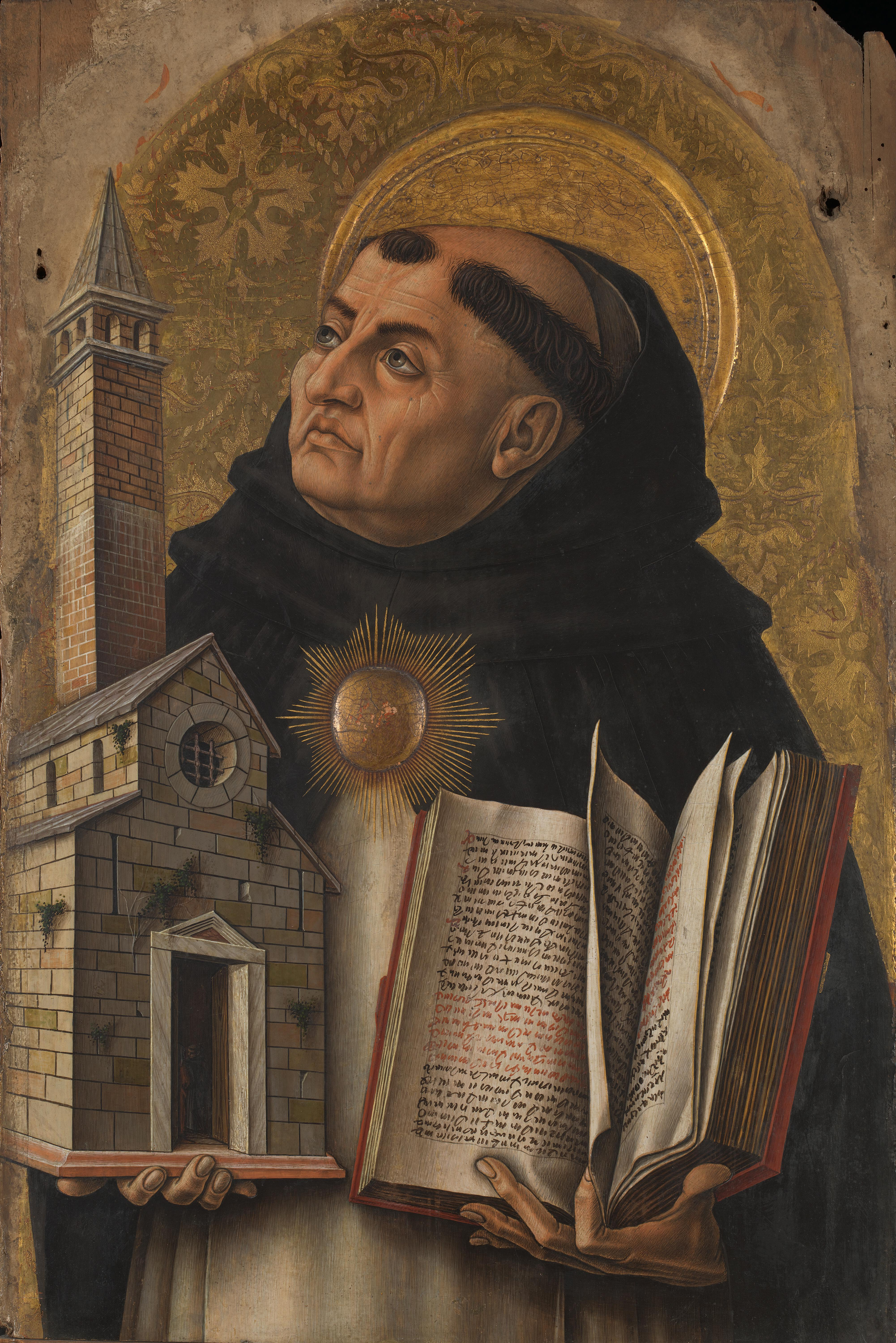
St Thomas Aquinas, 1476

He was master of his own shop when sent to prison for adultery in 1457. The dates he signed on the pictures that survive extend from 1468 on an altarpiece in the church of San Silvestro at Massa Fermana near Fermo to 1493 on The Dead Christ between St John, the Virgin and Mary Magdalene in Milan's Brera Gallery.

Though the artist advertised his Venetian origins with his signature, often some variation on Carolus Crivellus Venetus ('Carlo Crivelli of Venice'), Crivelli seems to have worked chiefly in the March of Ancona, and especially in and near Ascoli Piceno. Only two pictures can be found today in Venice, both in the church of San Sebastiano.

He painted in tempera only, despite the increasing popularity of oil painting during his lifetime, and on panels, though some of his paintings have been transferred to canvas. His predilection for decoratively punched gilded backgrounds is one of the marks of this conservative taste, in part imposed by his patrons. Of his early polyptychs, only one, the altarpiece from Ascoli Piceno, dated 1473, survives in its entirety in its original frame, and still in its original location (the city's Cathedral). All the others have been disassembled and their panels and predella scenes are divided among several museums.

An amorphous band of contemporaries, imitators and followers, termed Crivelleschi, reflect to varying degrees aspects of his style.

== Work ==
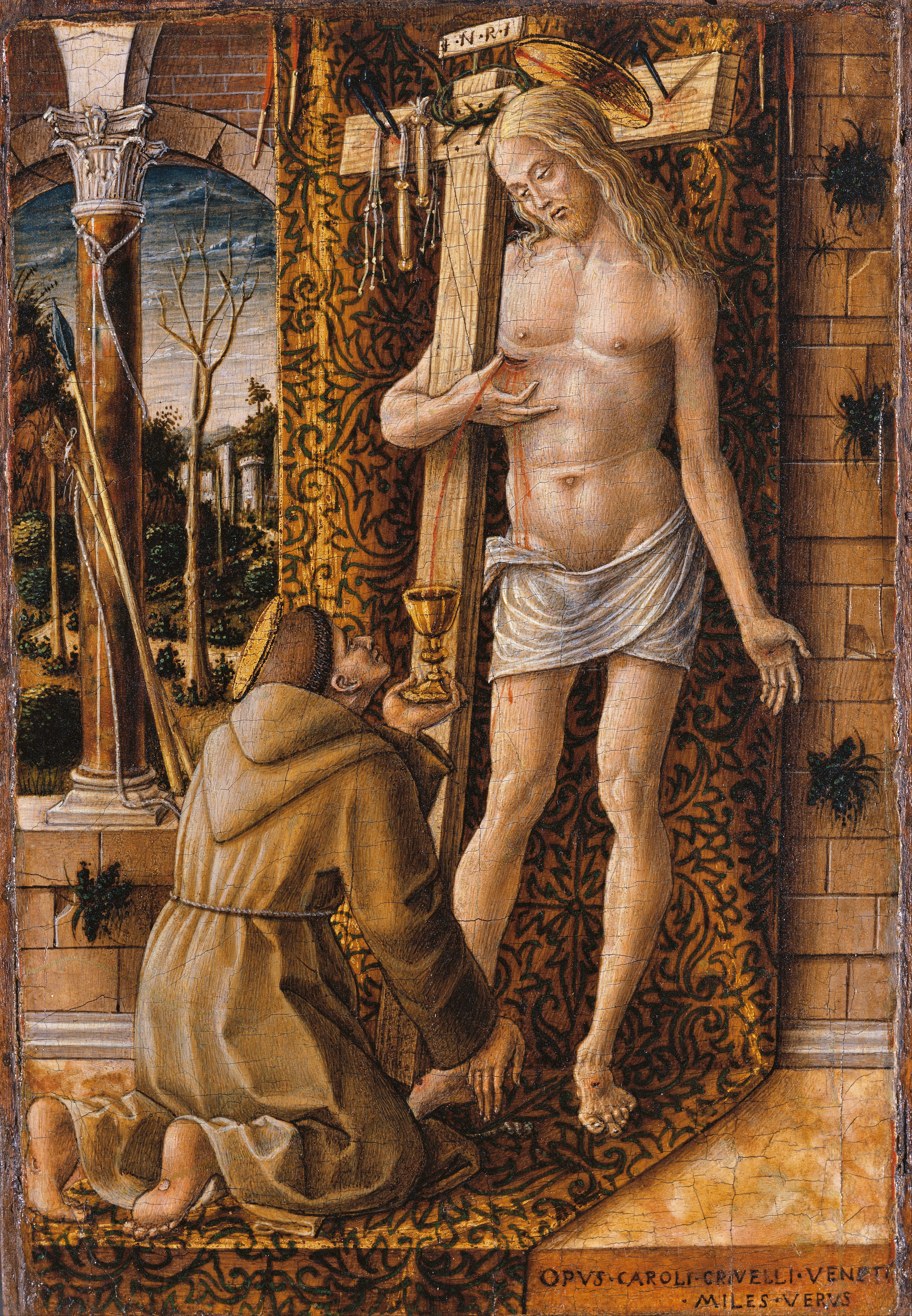
Saint Francis with the Blood of Christ, 1480–1486

Unlike the naturalistic trends arising in Florence during his lifetime, Crivelli's style continues to represent the courtly International Gothic sensibility. His urban settings are jewel-like and full of elaborate allegorical detail. He favored verdant landscape backgrounds, and his works can be identified by his characteristic use of fruits and flowers as decorative motifs, often depicted in pendant festoons, which are also a hallmark of the Paduan studio of Francesco Squarcione, where Crivelli may have worked.

His paintings have a linear quality identified with his Umbrian contemporaries. Crivelli is a painter of marked individuality. Unlike Giovanni Bellini, his contemporary, his works are not "soft", but clear and definite in contour with marked attention to detail. His use of trompe-l'œil, often compared with that found in the works of Northern Renaissance painters like Rogier van der Weyden, includes raised objects, such as jewels and armor modeled in gesso on the panel.

Commissioned by the Franciscans and Dominicans of Ascoli, Crivelli's work is exclusively religious in nature. His paintings consist largely of Madonna and Child images, Pietà, and the altarpieces known as polyptychs that were increasingly unfashionable. Often filled with images of suffering, such as gaping wounds in Christ's hands and side and the mouths of mourners twisted in agony, Crivelli's work fulfills the spiritual needs of his patrons. These ultra-realistic, sometimes disturbing qualities have often led critics to label Crivelli's paintings "grotesque", much like his fellow Northern Italian painter, Cosimo Tura. His work attracted numerous prestigious commissions and must have appealed to the taste of his patrons.

Carlo Crivelli died in the Marche (probably Ascoli Piceno) around 1495. Vittorio Crivelli, with whom he occasionally collaborated, was his younger brother. Pietro Alemanno, a painter who immigrated to the March of Ancona from Germany/Austria, was his pupil and collaborator. Donato Crivelli, who was also a pupil of Jacobello and was working in 1459, may be of the same family as Carlo.

== Reputation ==
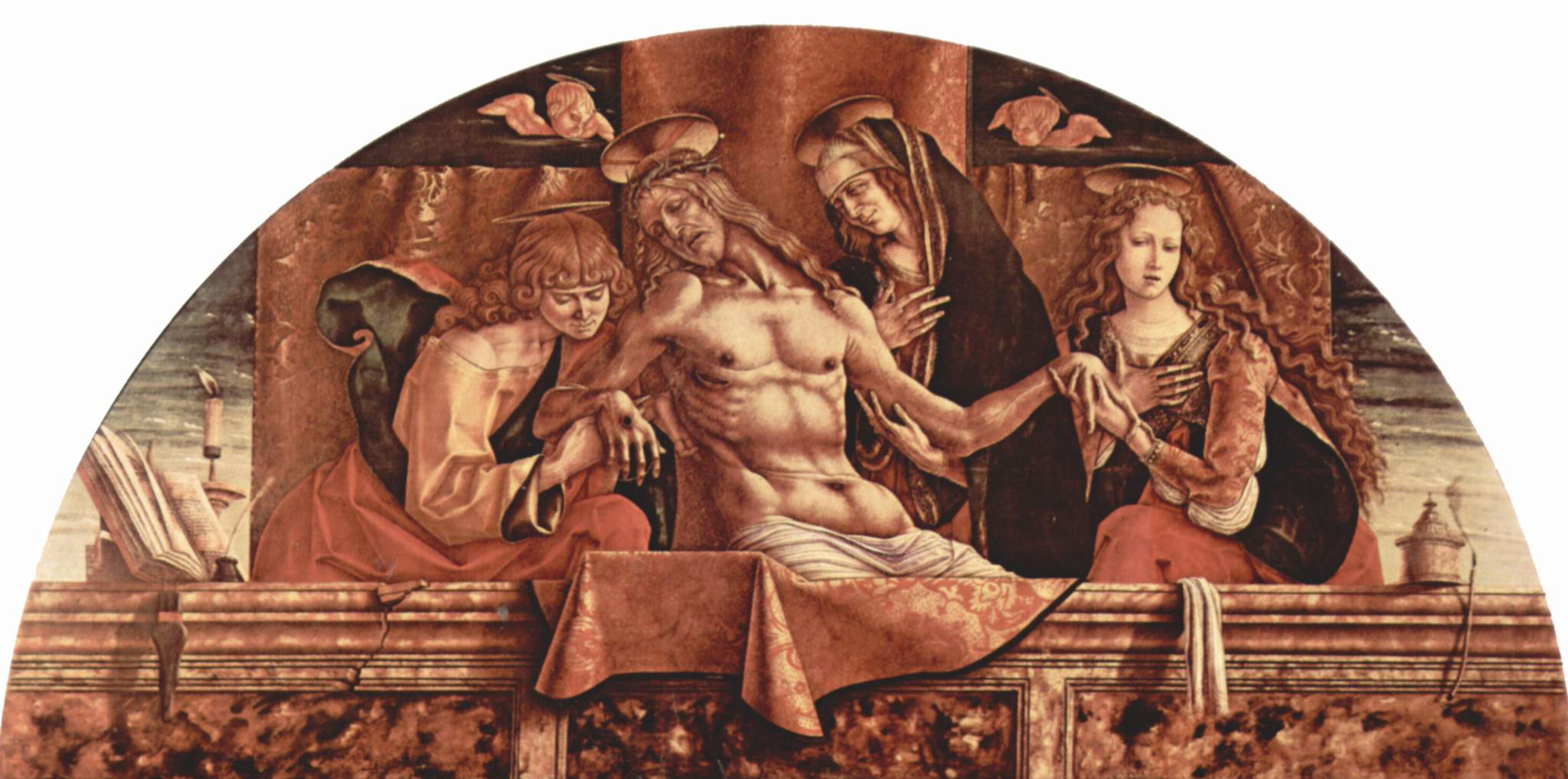
Pietà from the San Pietro di Muralto Altarpiece, 1493

His work fell out of favor following his death, and Vasari's Lives of the Most Excellent Painters, Sculptors, and Architects, which is notably Florentine in its outlook, does not mention him. He had something of a revival, especially in the UK, during the time of the pre-Raphaelite painters, several of whom, including Edward Burne-Jones, admired his work. His reputation faded with that movement, but recent writings on his work and a rehanging of his work in the National Gallery, London, have brought him renewed attention.

Susan Sontag in Notes on "Camp" (1992) wrote: "Camp is the paintings of Carlo Crivelli, with their real jewels and trompe-l'œil insects and cracks in the masonry."

== Works ==
- 1472 Altarpiece, now divided up between a number of galleries in the United States and Europe
- Adoration of the Shepherds, Musée des Beaux-Arts de Strasbourg
- The Annunciation, with Saint Emidius, 1486, National Gallery, London. Possibly his most famous painting.
- An Apostle, c. 1471–73, Metropolitan Museum of Art, New York
- Ascoli Piceno Altarpiece (or Saint Emidius Altarpiece), 1472–73, Cathedral of Saint Emidius, Ascoli Piceno. The only altarpiece entirely surviving, with its original XVth century carved wooden frame.
- Beato Ferretti, 1489, National Gallery, London
- Dead Christ, Vatican Gallery
- Enthroned Madonna, St. Jerome and St. Sebastian, 1490
- The Immaculate Conception, 1492
- Lamentation over the Dead Christ, 1485, Museum of Fine Arts, Boston
- Madonna and Child, 1480, Metropolitan Museum of Art, New York
- Madonna and Child, 1460, Verona
- Madonna and Child, 1480–1486, Ancona
- Madonna and Child, Church of San Giacomo Maggiore in Massignano
- Madonna and Child Enthroned, 1472, Metropolitan Museum of Art, New York
- Madonna and Child with Saints, 1490
- Madonna and Saints, 1491, Berlin
- Madonna of the Candle, Brera of Milan
- Madonna of Poggio Bretta, c. 1472, 71x50 cm, Ascoli Piceno, Diocesan Museum of Ascoli Piceno
- Madonna with child and saints, Monte San Martino in Marche
- Mary Magdalene, 1480, Rijksmuseum, Amsterdam
- Pietà, 1476, Metropolitan Museum of Art, New York
- Saint Dominic, 1472, Metropolitan Museum of Art, New York
- Saint Francis with the Blood of Christ, 1480–1486
- Saint George Slaying the Dragon, 1470
- Saint James Major, part of an altarpiece, 1472, Brooklyn Museum
- Saint Stephen from the Demidoff Altarpiece, 1476, National Gallery, London
- San Giacomo, 1472
- St Thomas Aquinas, 1476, National Gallery, London
- Virgin and Child with Saints Francis and Sebastian, 1491
- Virgin Annunciate, 1482, Frankfurt

Another of his principal pictures is in San Francesco di Matelica.

== Gallery of paintings ==
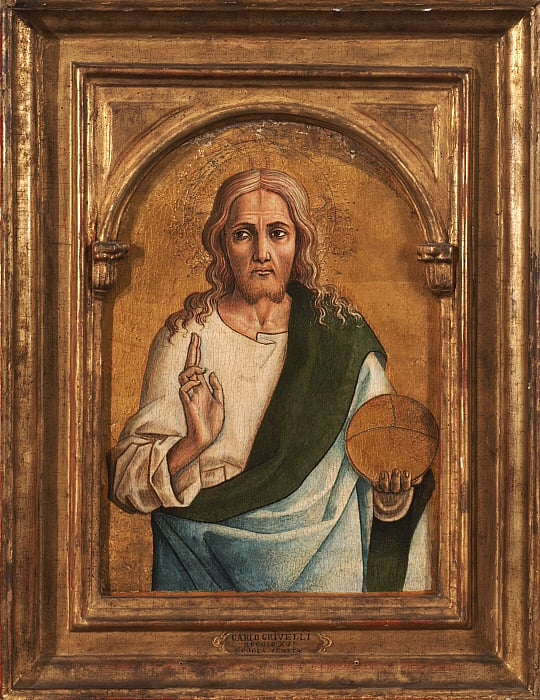
Salvator Mundi (1470-1472), tempera and gold possibly with oil on panel, 12 5/8 x 9 3/16 in. (32 x 23.4 cm), Clark Art Institute

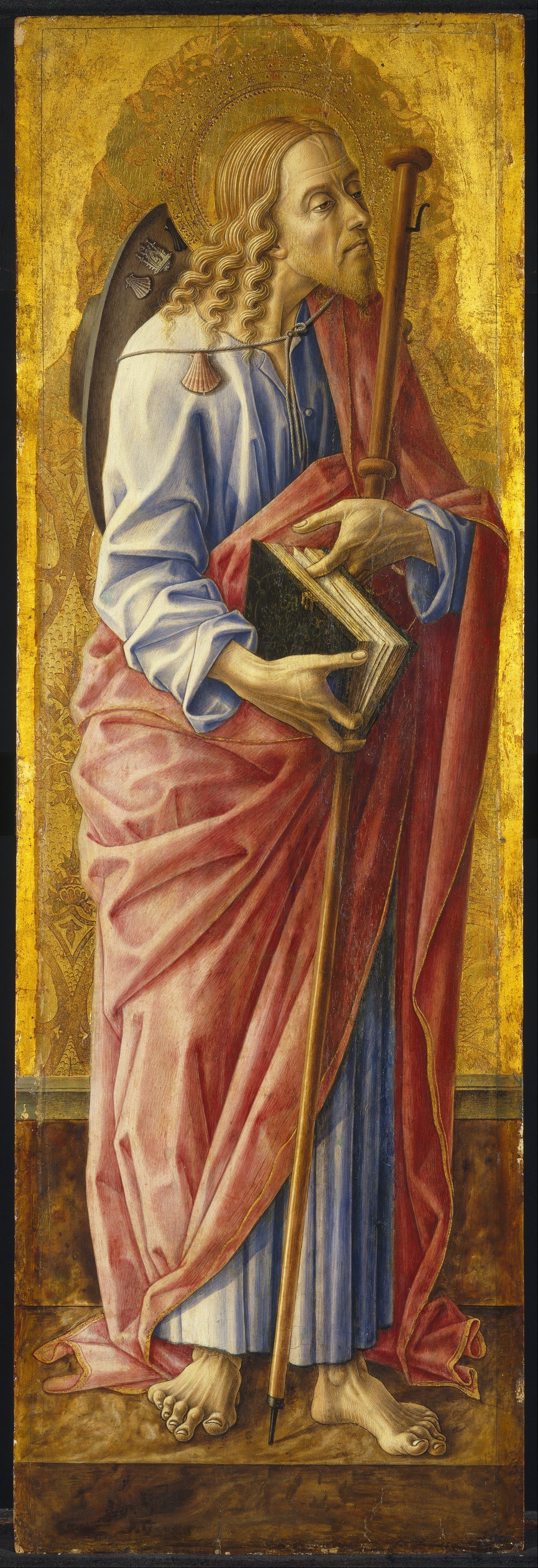
Saint James Major, 1472

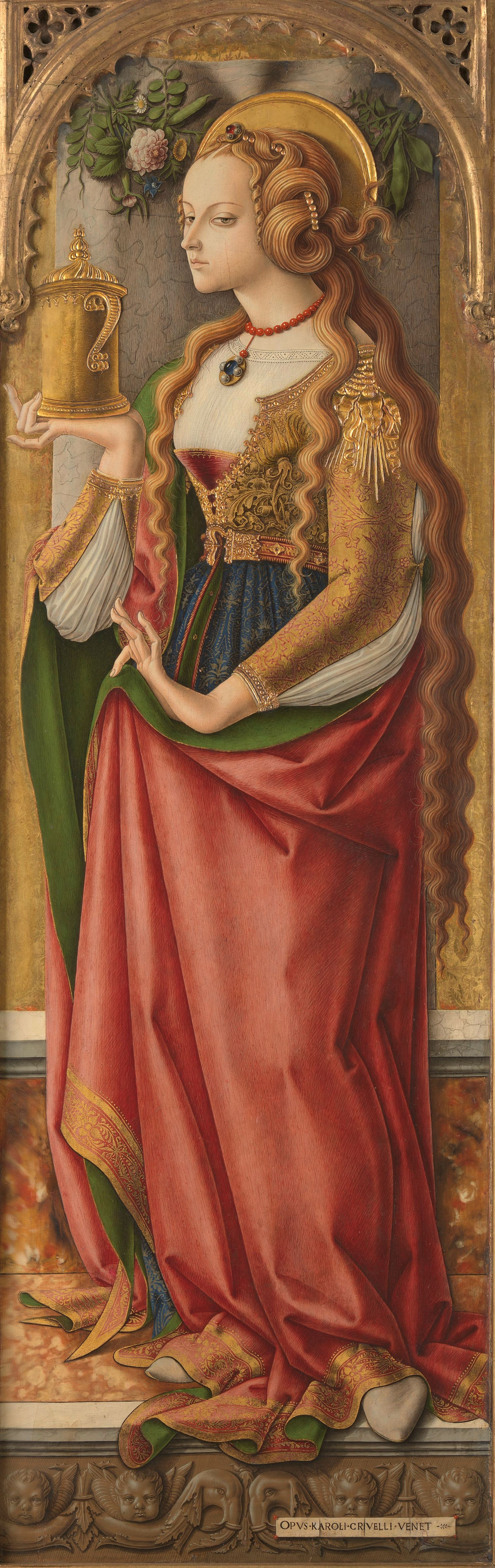
Mary Magdalene, 1480

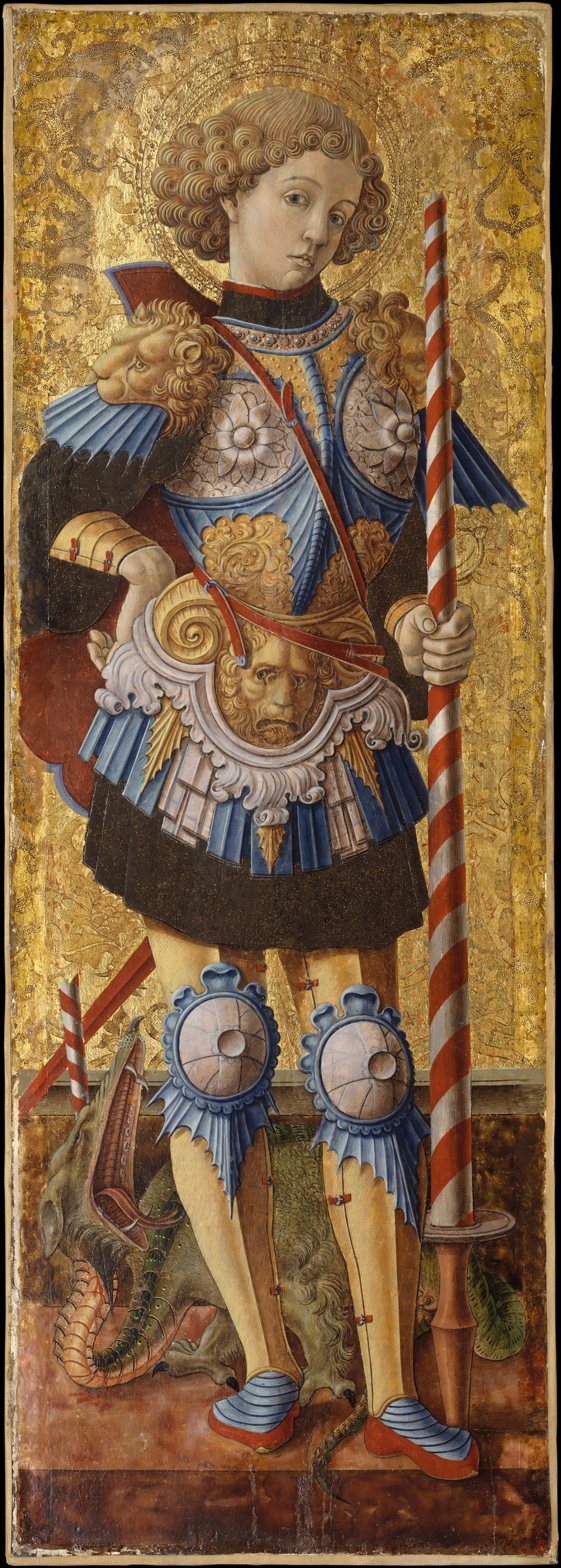
Saint George, 1472

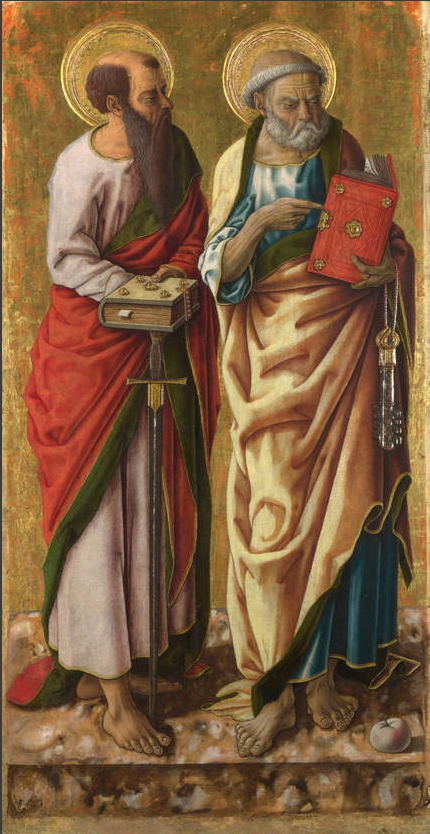
Saints Peter and Paul, part of the Porto San Giorgio Altarpiece, 1470

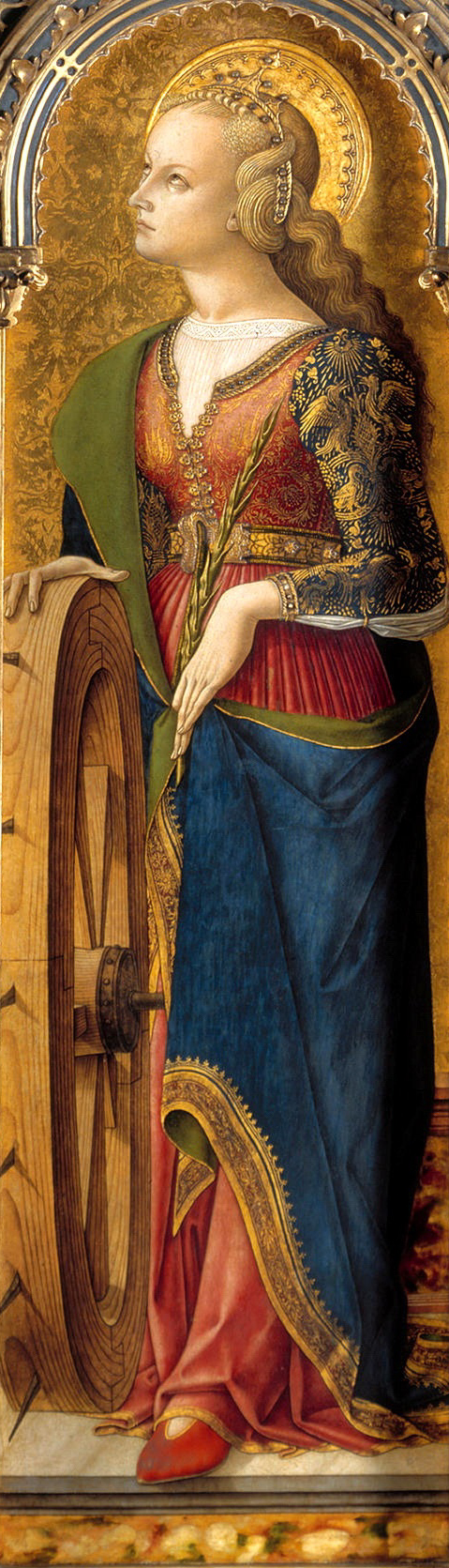
Saint Catherine, 1476
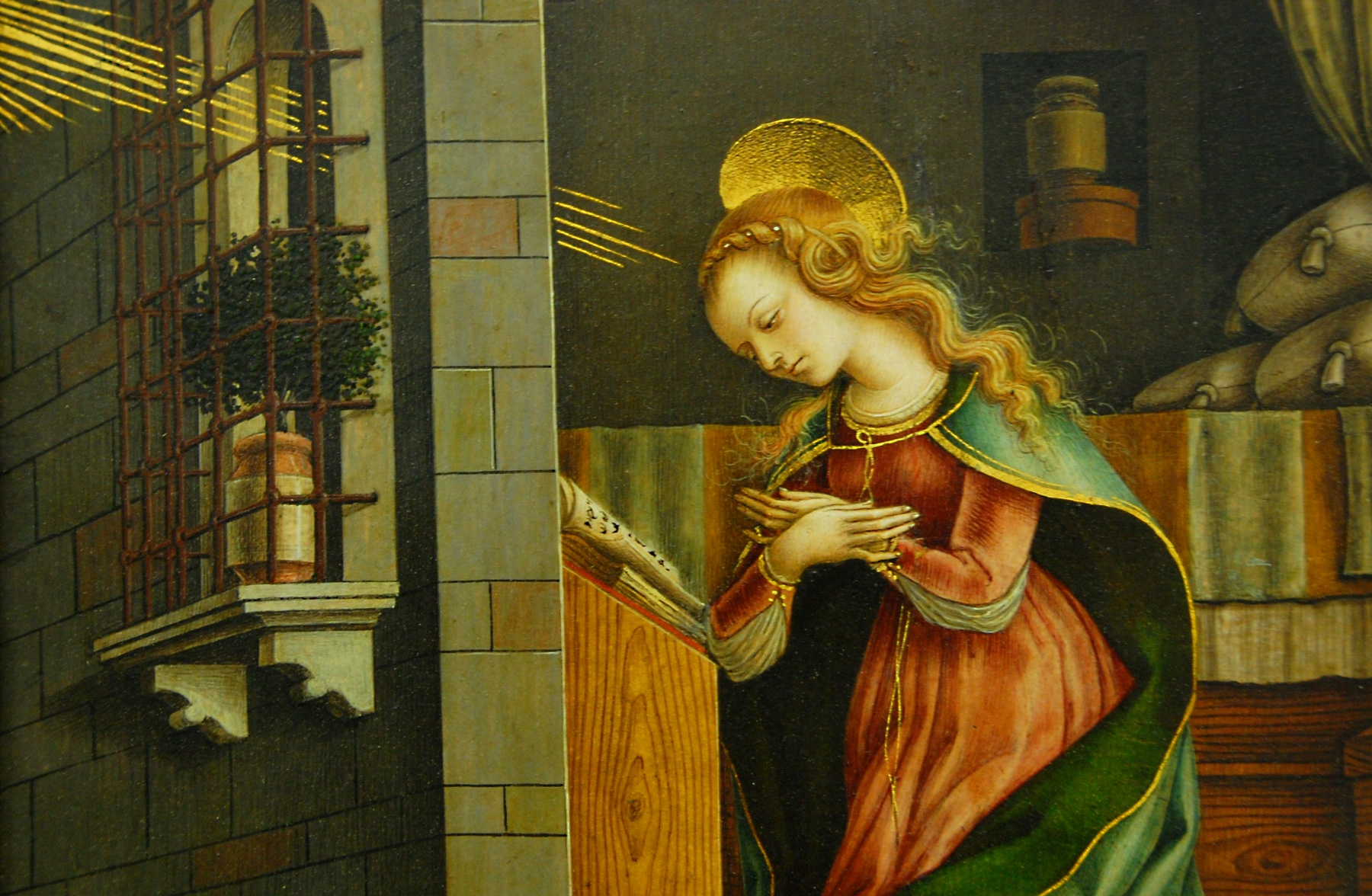
The Virgin Annunciate, 1482 (detail)

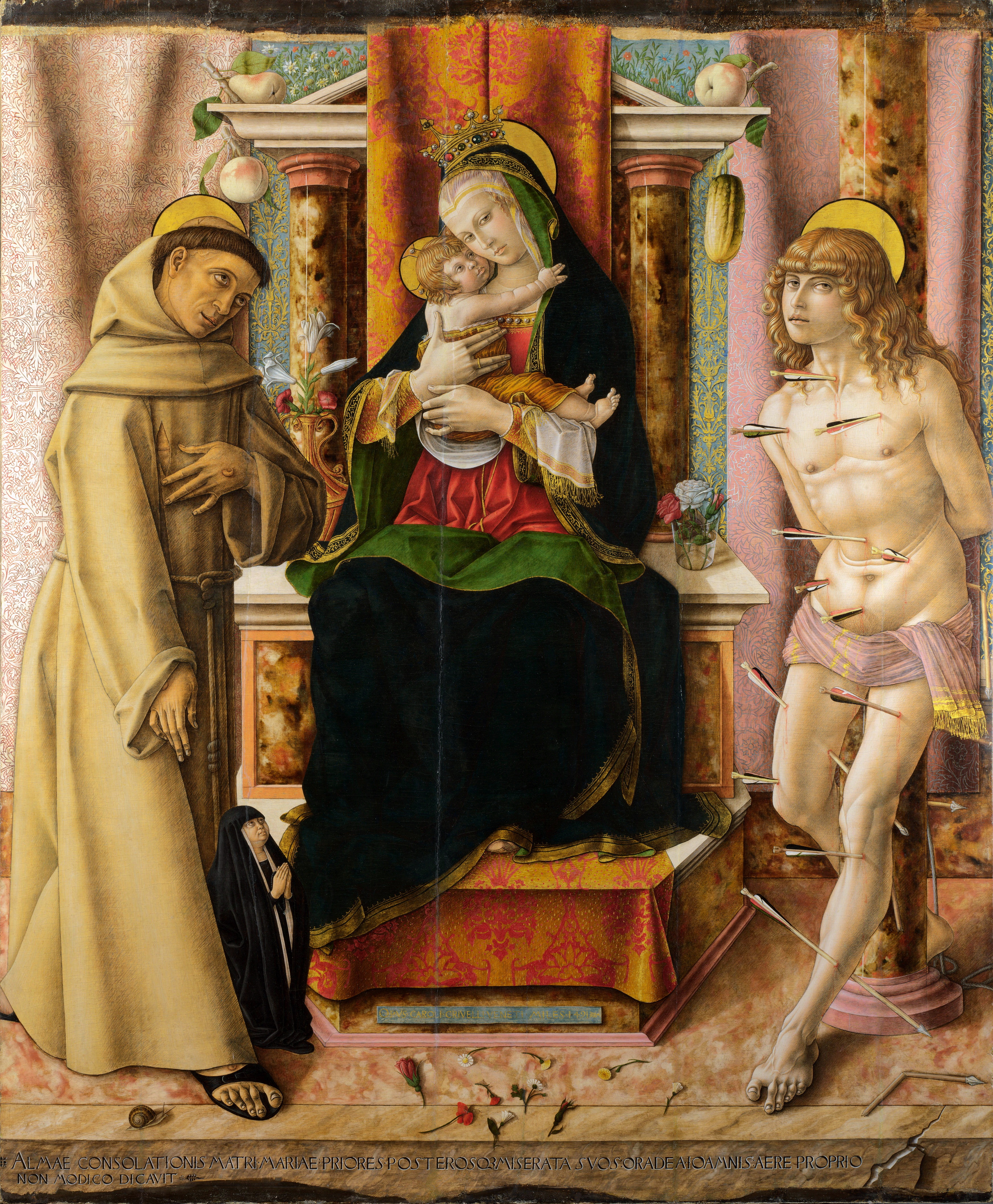
The Virgin and Child with Saints Francis and Sebastian, 1491

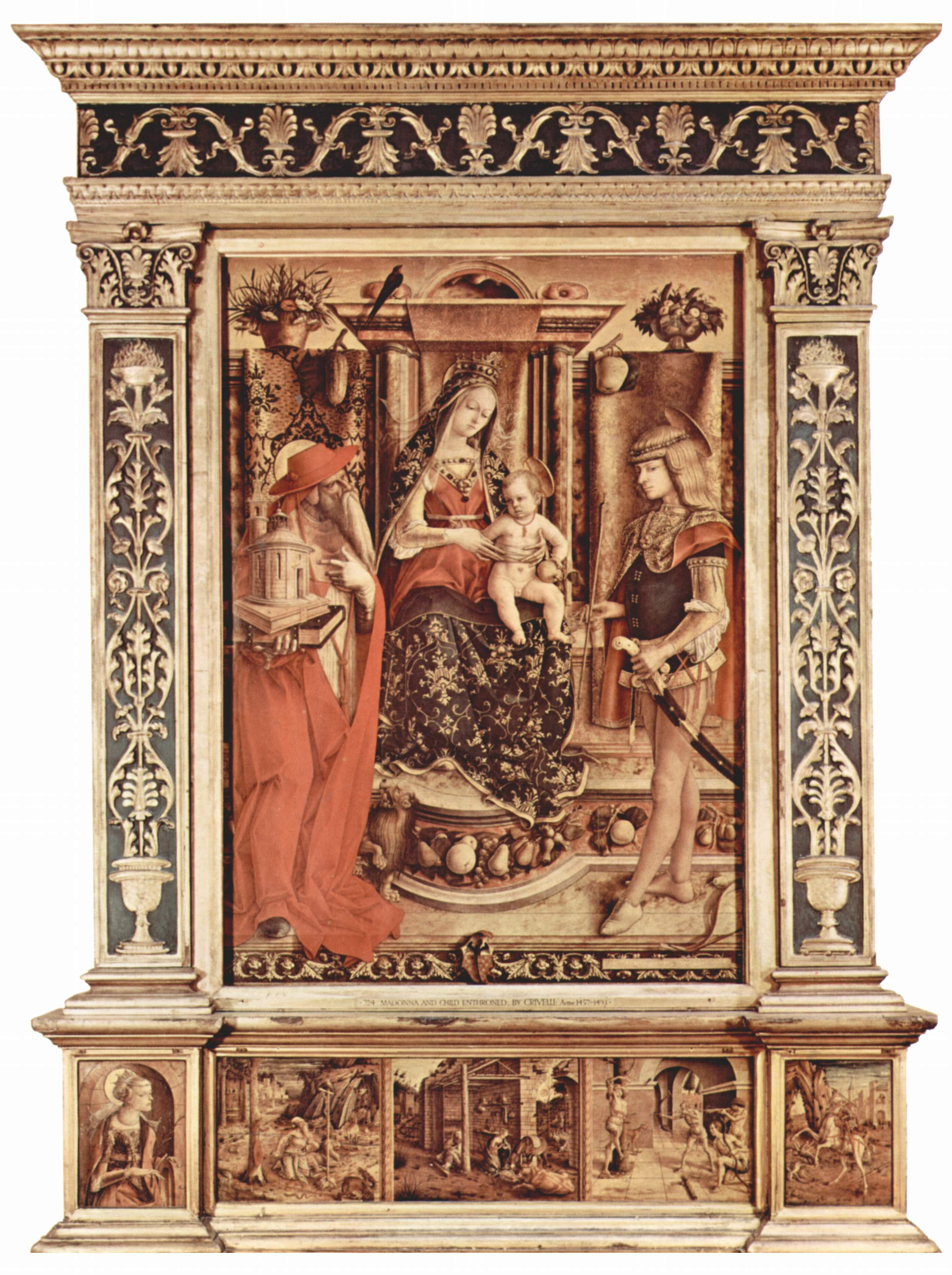
Enthroned Madonna, St. Jerome and St. Sebastian, 1490
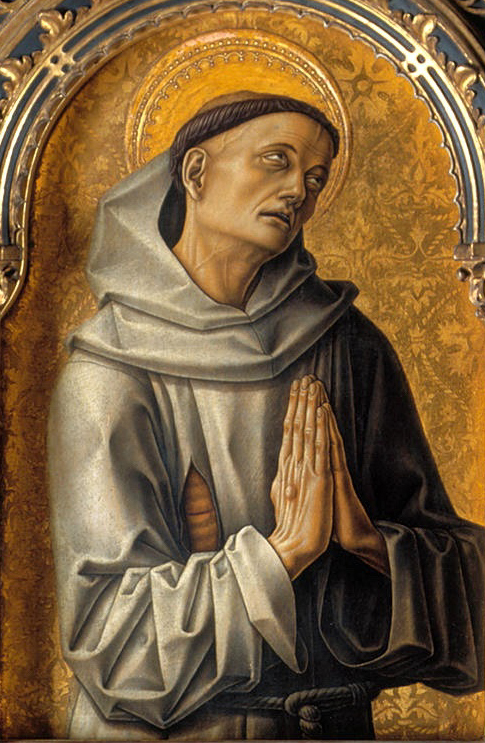
St. Francis, 1476

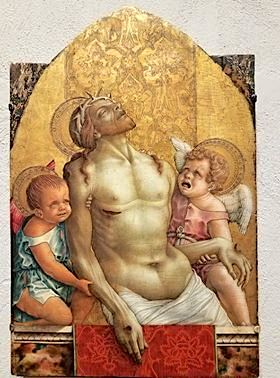
Dead Christ Supported by Two Angels, late 1470s, Philadelphia Museum of Art

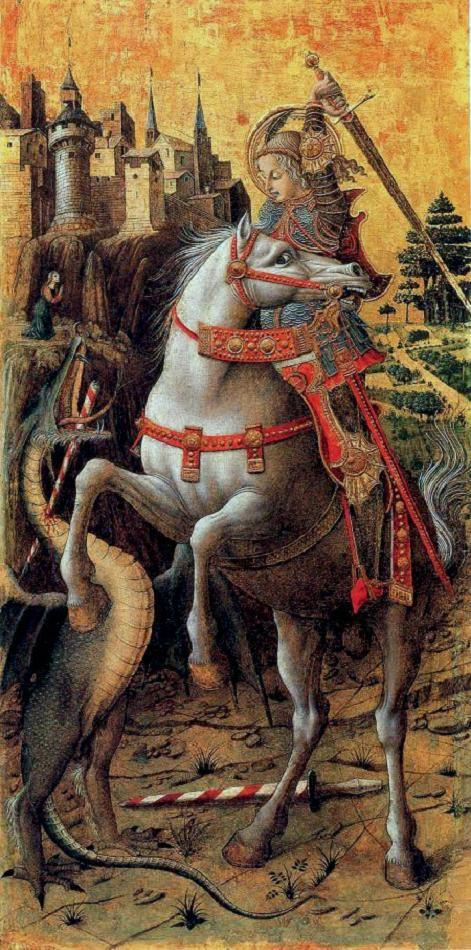
Saint George Slaying the Dragon, part of the Porto San Giorgio Altarpiece, 1470

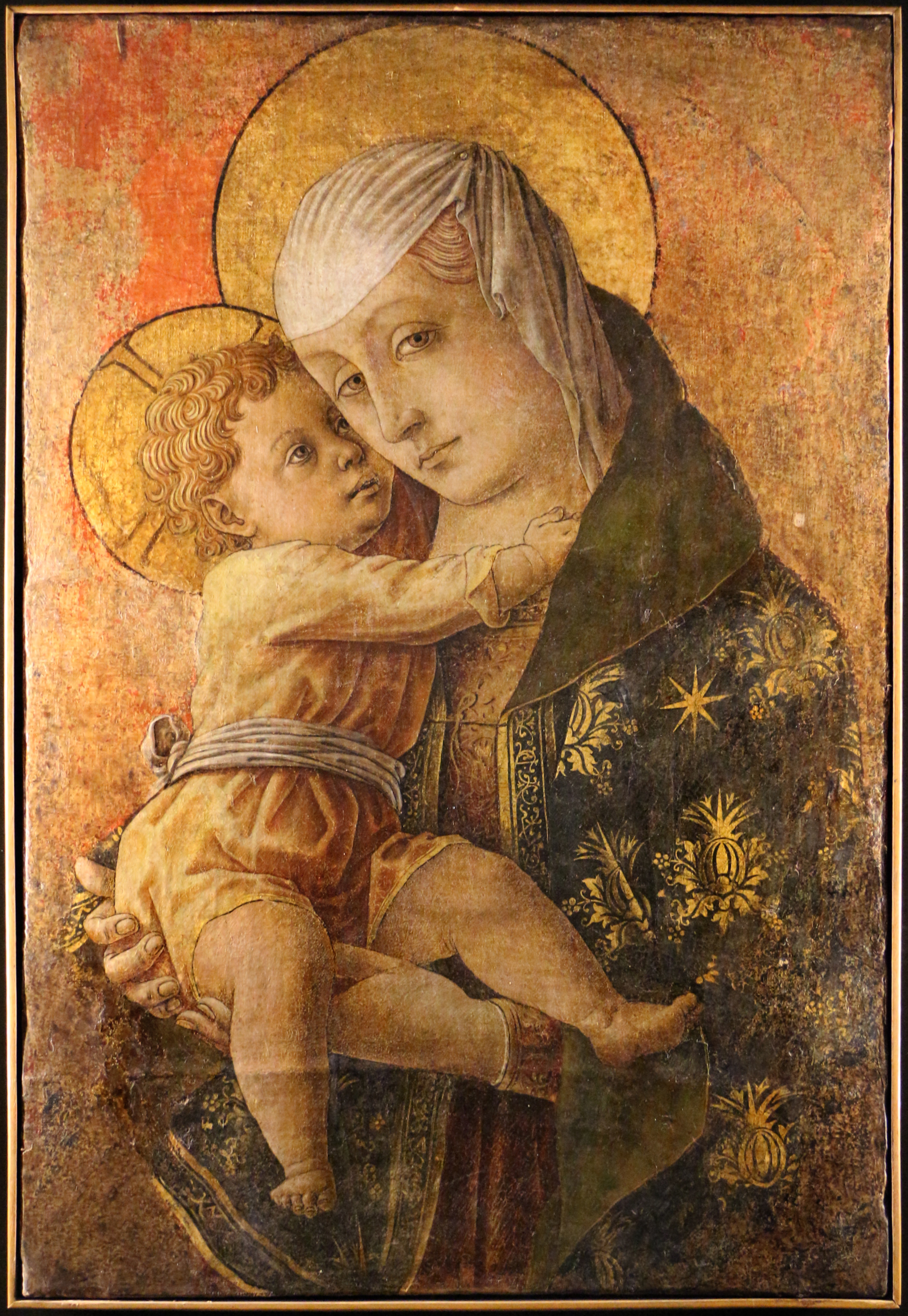
Madonna with Child, c. 1470, Macerata

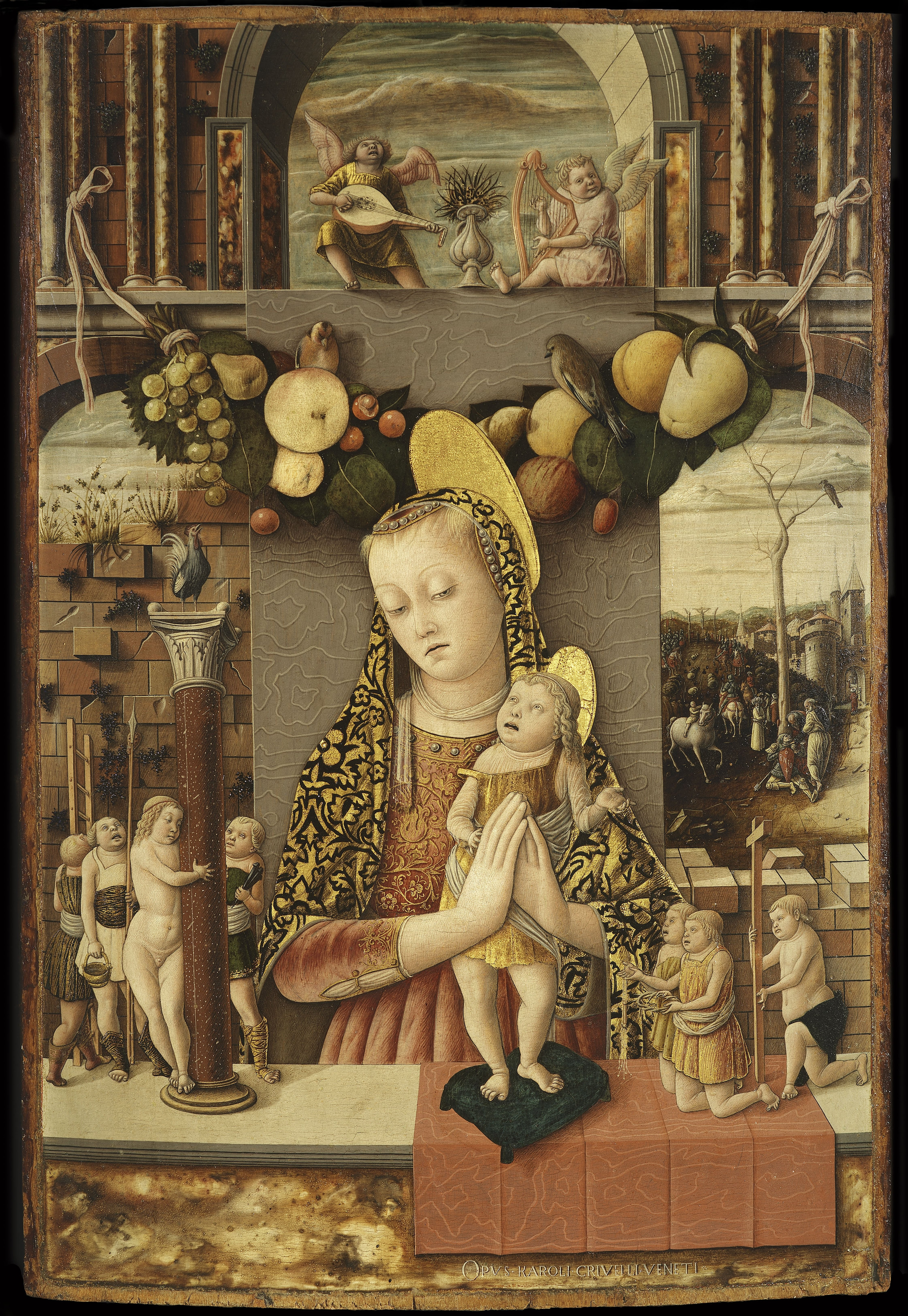
Madonna and Child, 1460, Verona

Madonna and Child, 1480, Metropolitan Museum of Art, New York City

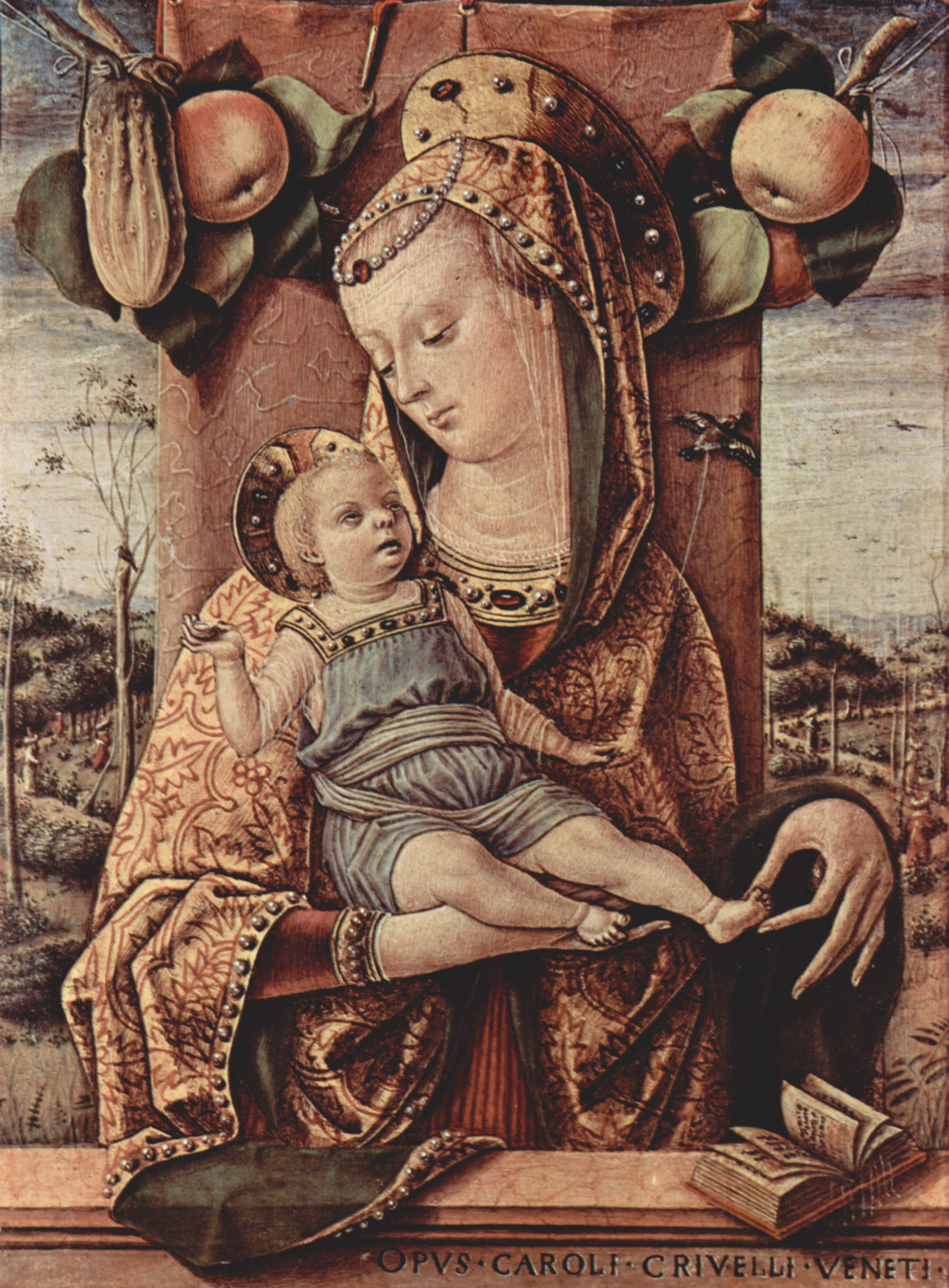
Madonna and Child, 1480–1486, Ancona

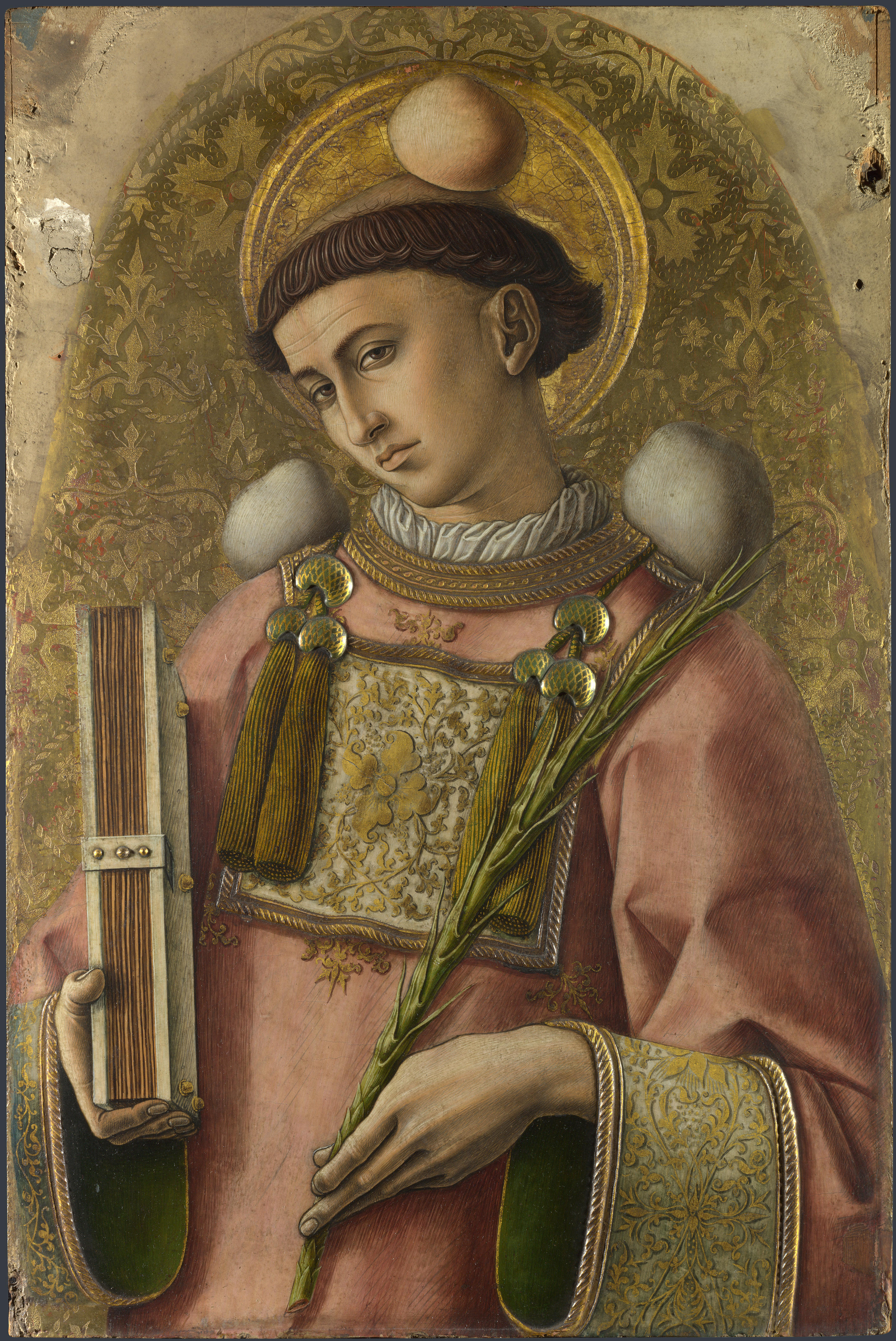
Saint Stephen, 1476, with three stones and the martyrs' palm

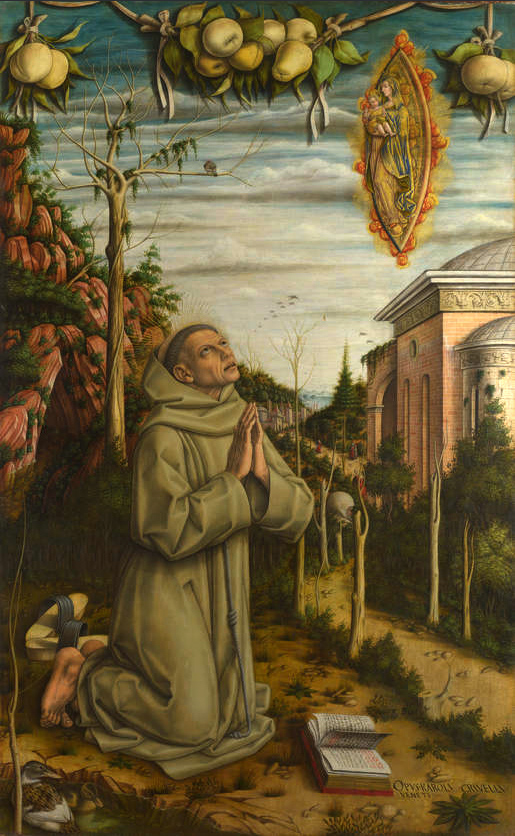
Beato Ferretti (The Vision of the Blessed Gabriele), c. 1489, National Gallery

== See also ==
- Crivelli carpet
- Huldschinsky Madonna (painting)

== Sources ==
- Encyclopedia of Artists, volume 2, edited by William H.T. Vaughan, 2000, ISBN 0-19-521572-9
- Italian Art, edited by Gloria Fossi, ISBN 88-09-01771-4, 2000
