= Steinbrener/Dempf & Huber =

Steinbrener/Dempf & Huber, founded in 2001, is an Austrian group of artists consisting of sculptor Christoph Steinbrener, photographer and graphic designer Rainer Dempf and architect Martin Huber. It was founded in 2001.

== Public projects and exhibitions ==
In 2005, the Delete! project in Vienna's Neubaugasse involved covering all commercial signs (including business signs and advertising posters) with yellow paper.

The subsequent project series Copy/Paste took the opposite approach: advertising, corporate logos and PR posters were made highly visible, albeit with a shift of context and deliberate misplacement. The Church of St. Ursula in Linz was transformed into a Starbucks store (Pass the Buck) during this project series.

In 2008, Jesuitenkosmos concealed Andrea Pozzo's ceiling painting in Vienna's Jesuit Church beneath a modern secular heavenly structure.

This method of displacement resulted in the 2009 exhibition Trouble in Paradise at Vienna's Schönbrunn Zoo, for which Steinbrener/Dempf & Huber installed foreign objects (cars, toxic waste barrels, railway tracks) in the animal enclosures, highlighting the confrontation between nature and civilization.

The Freeze! exhibition opened at the Vienna Museum of Natural History in June 2012; it attempted to replace the romantic view of animal and bird depictions with a realistic view of the modern conditions of growing civilization. For this show, Steinbrener/Dempf & Huber revived an old natural science display technique, the diorama. In collaboration with the museum's taxidermists, they presented snapshots of wild animals, which are usually familiar only in Internet videos or exotic travel documentaries, in urban settings.

In 2015, they mounted an Ibex on the head of the 43 metres (141 ft)-tall Bismarck monument in Hamburg, drawing attention to resurgent German nationalism. The piece was titled Capricorn Two.

In 2016, almost at the same time, the Viennese artist collective inaugurated two highly conspicuous "commentaries" on the architecture of their city, the sculptures Sign of the Times (on the façade of the Hotel InterContinental) and Lunch Atop (on the roof of a Viennese high-rise).

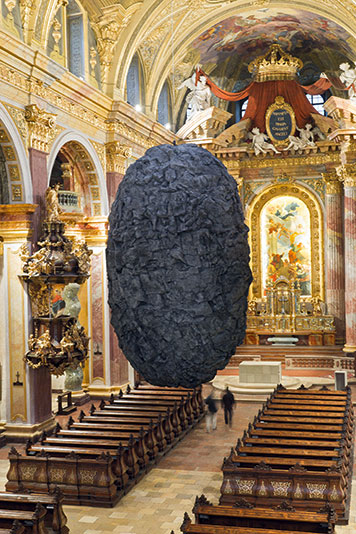
To be in Limbo

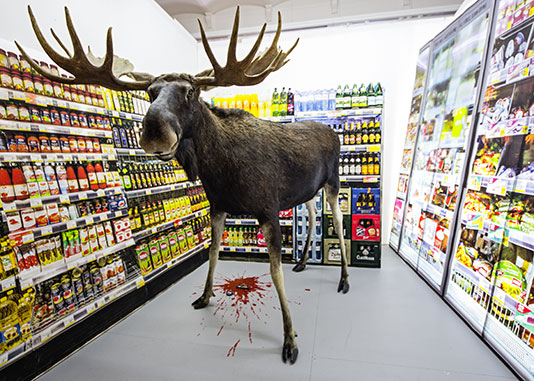
Freeze

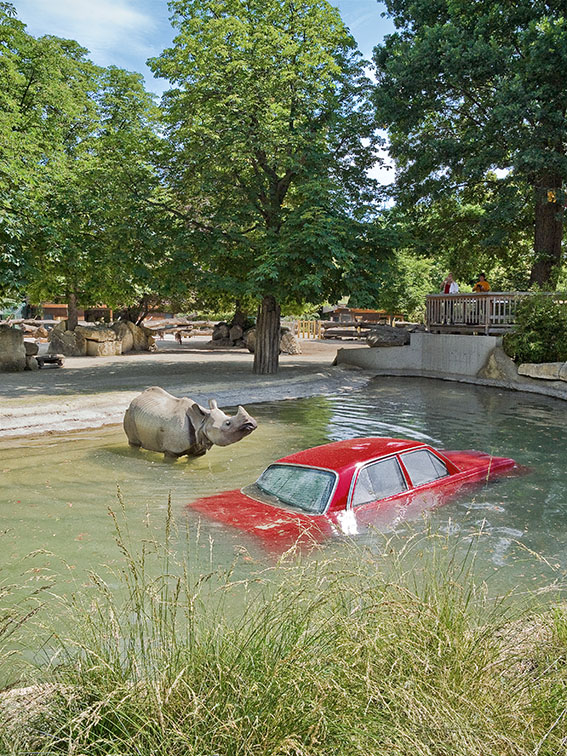
Trouble in Paradise

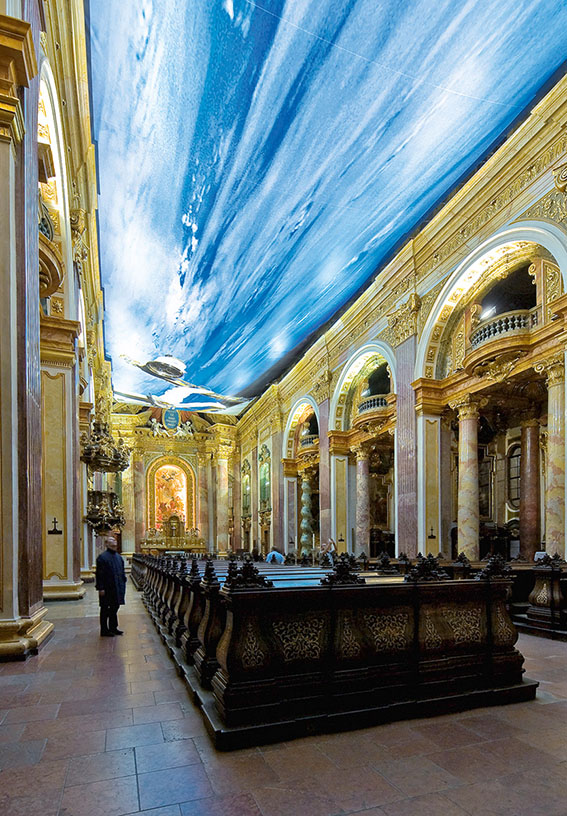
Jesuitenkosmos

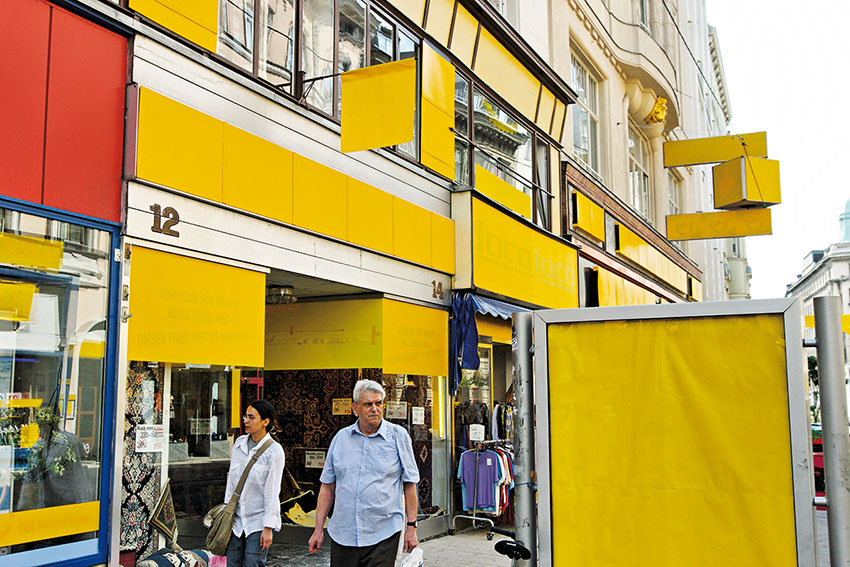
Delete!

== Studio works ==
Steinbrener/Dempf & Huber have created a few series of large-format photographs in recent years. One series shows images of dioramas made in collaboration with the taxidermists of the Natural History Museum in Steinbrener/Dempf & Huber's studio. In another, they developed "miniature dioramas" that also serve as three-dimensional sketches. The carefully arranged "Tierstücke" (animal pieces) in the classical 17th-century Flemish style focused exclusively on the figurative representation of mounted animals, using staged gestures and postures to unite elements that are zoologically incongruous.

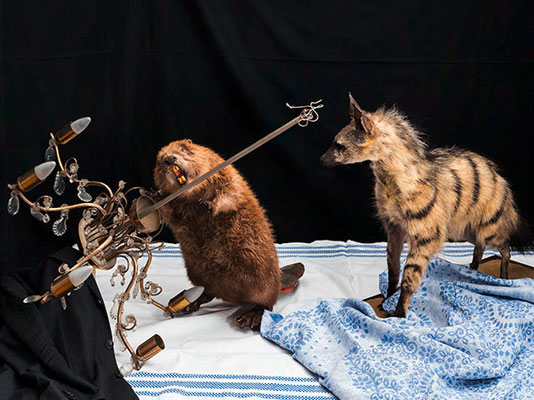
still life

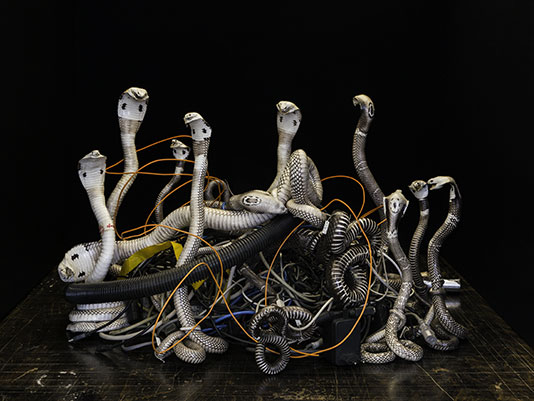
still life

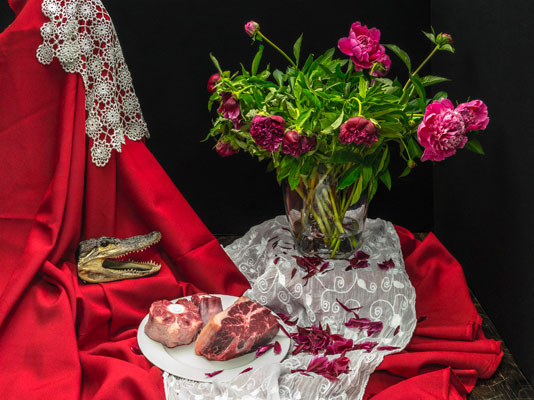
still life

=== Works ===
- Kasimir, Paul und andere : Wolfgang Zinggl, Galerie Niels Ewerbeck, Wien 1993.
- Duke Ellington und andere Samples : Nieglhell, Seyfarth, Triton Verlag, Wien 1996.
- Köpfe : Rainer Fuchs, Peter Assmann, Ulrike Sulikovsky, Johann v.Rauch, Christian Scheib u.a., Triton-Verlag, Wien 1997.
- Unternehmen Capricorn : Hans Ulrich Reck, Christian Reder u.a., Triton-Verlag, Wien 2001.
- Operation Figurini : Ausstellungszeitung mit Beiträgen u.a. Erika Weinzierl, Anton Pelinka, Rainer Fuchs, Martin Prinzhorn, Catrin Pichler, Wien 2002.
- Operation Figurini – Dokumentationsfilm, Regie: Erwin Wagenhofer; Produktion: Allegro-Film, Wien 2003.
- Delete : Siegfried Mattl (Hrsg.), mit Beiträgen von Karl-Heinz Stierle, Tom Holert, Chantal Mouffe, James Donald, Bernhard Kellner, Klaus Theweleit, Orange Press, Freiburg 2005.
- Delete – Dokumentationsfilm von Erwin Wagenhofer, 2005.
- Trouble in Paradise : Skulpturen in den Gehegen des Tiergarten Schönbrunn, mit Beiträgen von Ernst Strouhal, Dorothee Bauerle-Willert, Dagmar Schratter u.a., Orange Press, Freiburg 2009.
- Wem gehört die Stadt, Wien – Kunst im öffentlichen Raum seit 1968 : Verlag für moderne Kunst Nürnberg, 2009.
- Parabol No. 6, Don't dare' : Section a, 2011.
- Kartographisches Denken : Christian Reder (Hg.), Edition Transfer bei SpringerWienNewYork, 2012.
- Public Art Vienna, Aufbrüche – Werke – Interventionen : Roland Schöny (Hg.), Verlag für moderne Kunst Nürnberg, 2012.
- Vorsicht Kunst: Politik trifft Kunst – Zum Verhältnis von politischer und kultureller Bildung : Anja Besand (Hg.), Bundeszentrale für politische Bildung, 2012.
- Drei im Blau – Kunst und Glaube : Gustav Schörghofer, Residenz Verlag, 2013.
- Salon der Hoffnung : Nikolaus Schaffhausen, Österreichische Präsidentschaftskanzlei/Kunsthalle Wien, 2013.
- Hier & Jetzt I Hic & Nunc – 900 Jahre Stift Klosterneuburg : Stift Klosterneuburg (Hg.), 2014.
