= Piazza Montanara (Rome) =

Ancient square in Rome, Italy

- Square
- Piazza Montanara in an engraving by Giuseppe Vasi (1752).
- Features: Theatre of Marcellus, Fountain
- Location: Rome, Italy
- Interactive map of Piazza Montanara

Piazza Montanara was an ancient and picturesque square of Rome (Italy) located at the foot of the Tarpeian Rock, in close proximity to the Capitolium and partially bounded by the Theatre of Marcellus.
Now it has completely disappeared following the demolition of the Fascist era, to create the initial stretch of Via del Mare, later called Via del Teatro di Marcello. The destruction of Piazza Montanara was part of a larger project of "isolation" of the Capitoline Hill, which ended up completely erasing the district of medieval origin that surrounded its east and south-east slopes.

== History ==
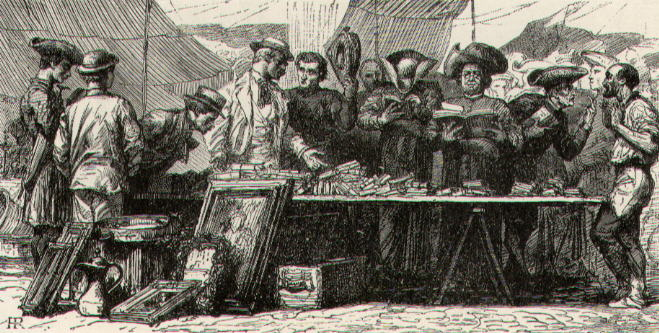
The old flea market in Piazza Montanara by Henri Regnault (1860s).

Located in the district known in the Middle Ages with the name ad Elephantus – from a bronze statue of Elephas herbarius which rose nearby in Roman times, as an emblem of the adjacent Forum Holitorium – the memory of the square is now handed down by the very short stretch, called Via Montanara, which leads to Piazza di Campitelli.
From the square, through Via dei Sugherari (no more existing as well), which followed for a while the curves of the Theatre and reached the Catena di Pescheria (now Via del Foro Piscario), it was possible to reach the nearby Piazza di Pescheria at the Porticus Octaviae, while the continuation of the former Via Montanara and Via Tor de' Specchi gave access to the foot of the Cordonata of the Capitolium and to the church of Santa Rita (which was dismantled and rebuilt on one side of the current Via Montanara); on the south side, the square was connected to Santa Maria in Cosmedin by the straight Via Bocca della Verità, which passed in front of San Nicola in Carcere.

The square was along the street with the same name and on the border of the Rioni Sant'Angelo and Campitelli and, given its centrality, it was in the past a crowded gathering place for people from the surrounding countryside and hills and also from outside the Papal States, which from the early hours of the morning gathered there offering themselves as labour force; moreover, given the low literacy of those workers, it was also much frequented by scriveners who gave their services for the drafting of letters and other acts of various kinds.

=== The fountain ===
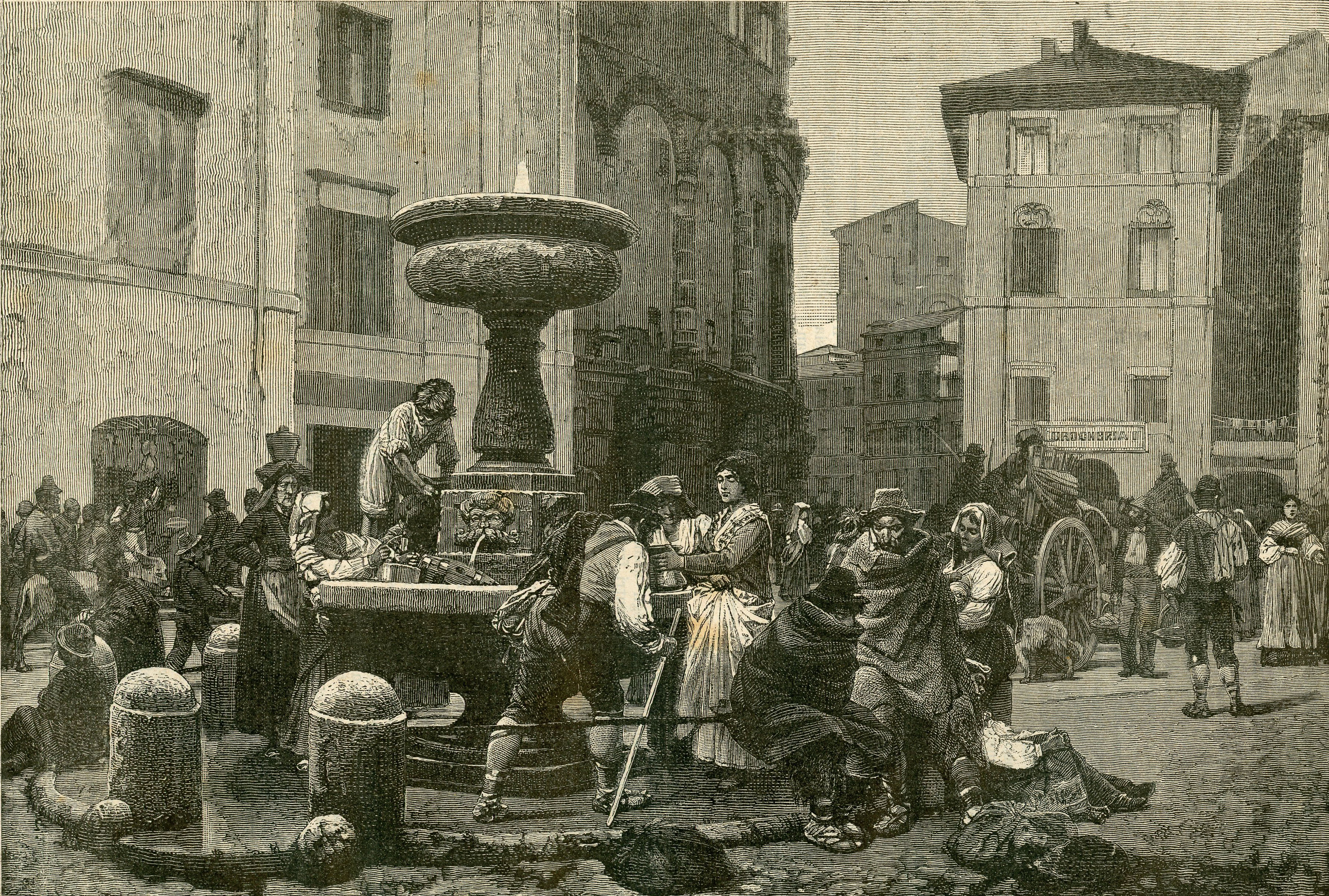
Popular life of old Rome – Piazza Montanara, a woodcut from L’illustrazione popolare showing the square with the fountain (1886).

The fountain of the Aqua Virgo, built in 1589 to a design by Giacomo Della Porta, rose in the center of the square until the 1930s. It was surrounded by several taverns, as well as boxes for tumblers and puppeteers.
Following the demolition work, it was moved to the Orange Garden on the Aventine and after forty years, in 1973, to its current location in Piazza di San Simeone along Via dei Coronari, in front of Palazzo Lancellotti.

=== Former appearance ===
The square was particularly scenic due to the number of workshops (coalmen, butchers and more) that overlooked it and were located, as evidenced by numerous prints and photographs of the time, inside the arches in the basement of the Theatre of Marcellus: such arches were partly walled up and then restored to its original forms after the great demolition works of the area.
The ground level of the square is now recognizable by the line that joins the pillars of the first order of the Theatre at the point of greatest wear and was the same as the current street level; the street, however, occupy a marginal part of the former square, so that the archaeological area is now at the foot of the building and occupies the space of a large part of the square but at a much lower level, due to the same works that involved the grading of the whole area close to the Theatre and which freed it entirely from the occlusions arguably made as early as the 13th century.

The square was crossed by the first service of public transport in town, that is a horse-drawn omnibus which since 1845 connected Piazza Venezia to San Paolo Fuori le Mura.

== The square in literature ==
- The square is mentioned in three Sonnets by Giuseppe Gioachino Belli: one dedicated to Er segretario de Piazza Montanara (a public scrivener) and two dedicated to Santaccia de Piazza Montanara (a prostitute).

== See also ==
- Theatre of Marcellus
- Capitoline Hill
- Cordonata (Rome)
- Tarpeian Rock
- Santa Rita da Cascia in Campitelli
- Fountain of Piazza San Simeone
