= Church of the Gesù, Montepulciano =

Roman Catholic church in Tuscany, Italy

Coordinates: 43°05′34.4″N 11°46′56.1″E

The church of the Gesù, also known as the Parish church of the Santissimo Nome di Gesù, is a Baroque style, Roman Catholic church located on Via di Voltaio #101 in central Montepulciano, region of Tuscany, Italy.

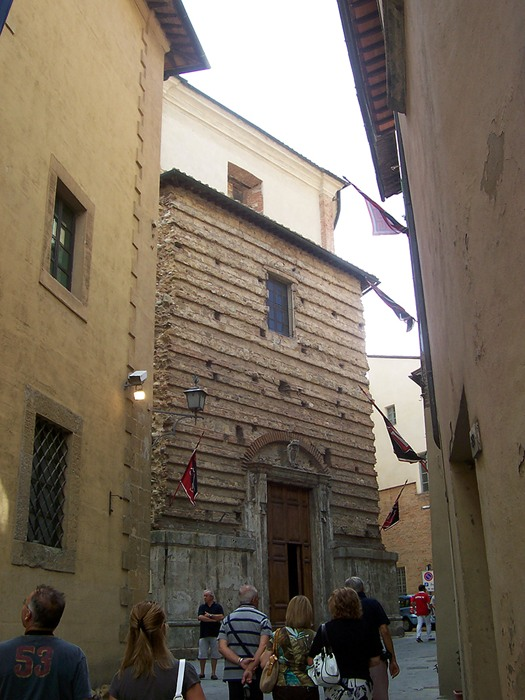
Facade of the Gesù'.

== History ==
The Jesuit Order, who commissioned this church, after some initial travails, firmly settled in Montepulciano in 1606. The set up an office in the oratory of the Compagnia della Croce, near the present church, and by 1630 had set up a school. Seeking to attach a church to the school, they commissioned this church at the site of the Oratory of the Tre Ave. Construction only began by 1691, with plans for a circular layout with a large dome, designed by Giovanni Battista Origoni. However concerns with the soundness of the ambitious design in this hilltop town with steep borders, caused them to recruit a design from the fellow Jesuit, Andrea Pozzo, who had shown success in creating the interior illusion of a dome in Sant'Ignazio, Rome. Between 1702 and 1703, he worked in Montepulciano. Ultimately the church was completed in 1713 with the dome design of Sebastiano Cipriani.

The exterior facade remains in unfinished brick, except for the portal. The interior has an elaborate Baroque decoration. The elliptical shape recalls the layout of Borromini's San Carlino alle Quattro Fontane in Rome, with rhythmic uses of columns and pilasters. The stucco-work was completed by Francesco Notari, with four stucco statues by Bartolomeo Mazzuoli, two flanking each side chapel. The cupolina and "trompe l’oeil" side altars were painted by Antonio Colli. The apse, depicting the Glory of the Holy Name of Jesus (1901), was frescoed by Sallustio Tarugi.

Other churches highly influenced by Borromini's San Carlino include Santa Rita da Cascia in Campitelli.
