= Fountain of Piazza San Simeone =

- Fontana di piazza San Simeone
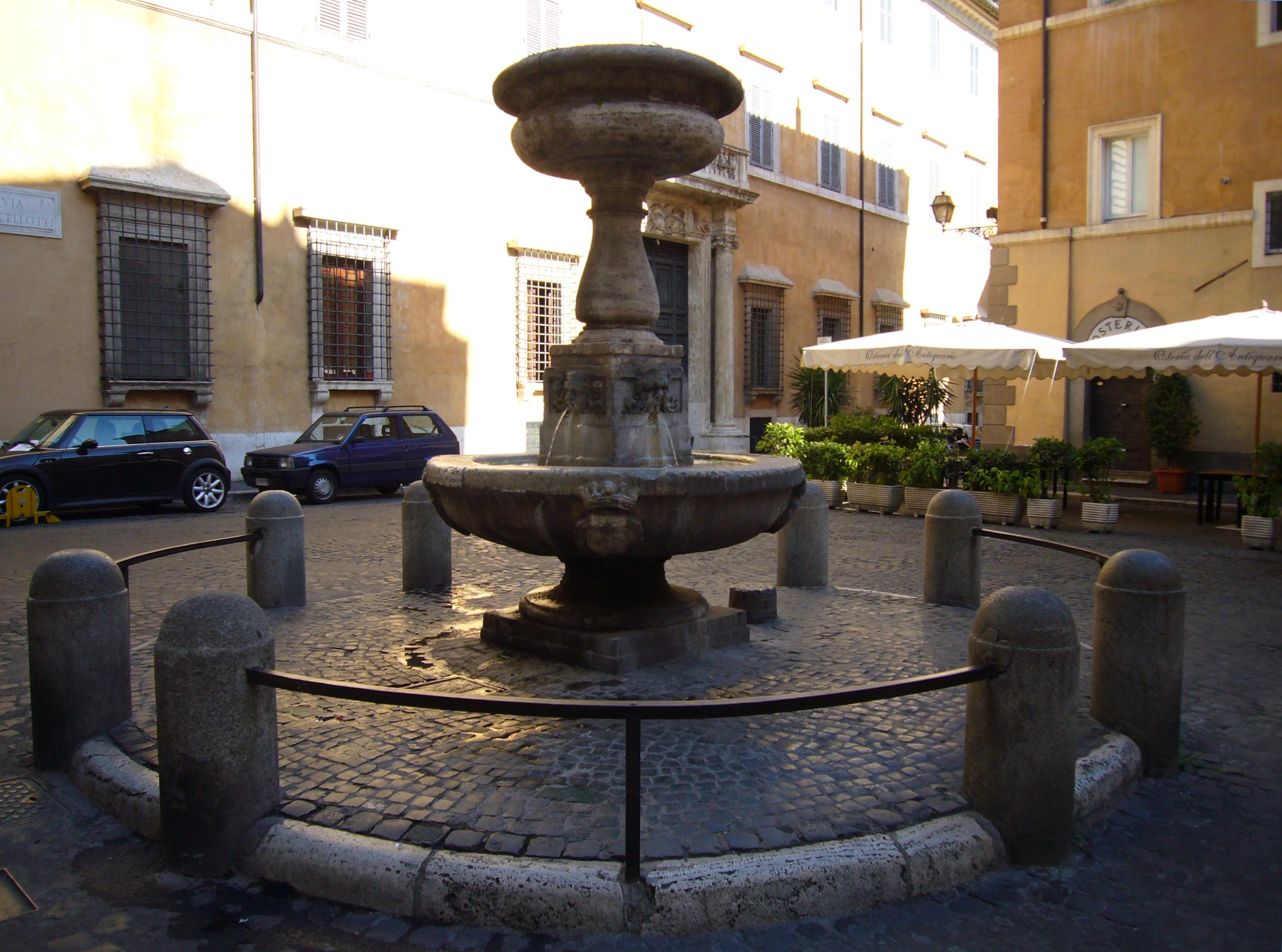
- The fountain in 2009
- Features: Popular fountain, basin with four mascheroni, coats of arms of Consevatori of Rome
- Design: Giacomo Della Porta
- Builder: Pietro Gucci
- Completed: 1829
- Location: Piazzetta San Simeone, Rome
- Interactive map of Fountain of Piazza San Simeone

The Fountain of Piazza San Simeone (Italian: Fontana di piazza San Simeone) is a fountain in Piazza San Simeone, Rome, Italy.

== Description ==
The fountain is located in Piazzetta San Simeone, next to Via dei Coronari and Via San Simeone, next to Palazzo Lancellotti.

Its use was intended for the common people, in the context of the now demolished Piazza Montanara. The design of the fountain is due to Giacomo Della Porta in 1589. The fountain was made by the stonemason Pietro Gucci. At that time, the fountain was linked to Aqua Virgo.

At the end of 17th century, a second basin was added to the fountain, together with four sculpted masks (mascheroni).

In 1829 the basin was changed and decorated with the coats of arms of the Conservatori and the Prior of the Caporioni in charge at that time (Paolo Carandini, Odoardo De‘ Quintili, Paolo Martinez and Pietro De’ Vecchi).

After the demolition of the Piazza Montanara in Rome during the years 1930s, the fountain was moved to Orange Garden on the Aventine and, in 1973 -then after 40 years- moved again to the current location of Piazzetta San Simeone.

== Gallery ==
Piazza Montanara with the Fountain depicted by Giuseppe Vasi.

== See also ==
- List of fountains in Rome
