= Illusionistic ceiling painting =

Artistic tradition

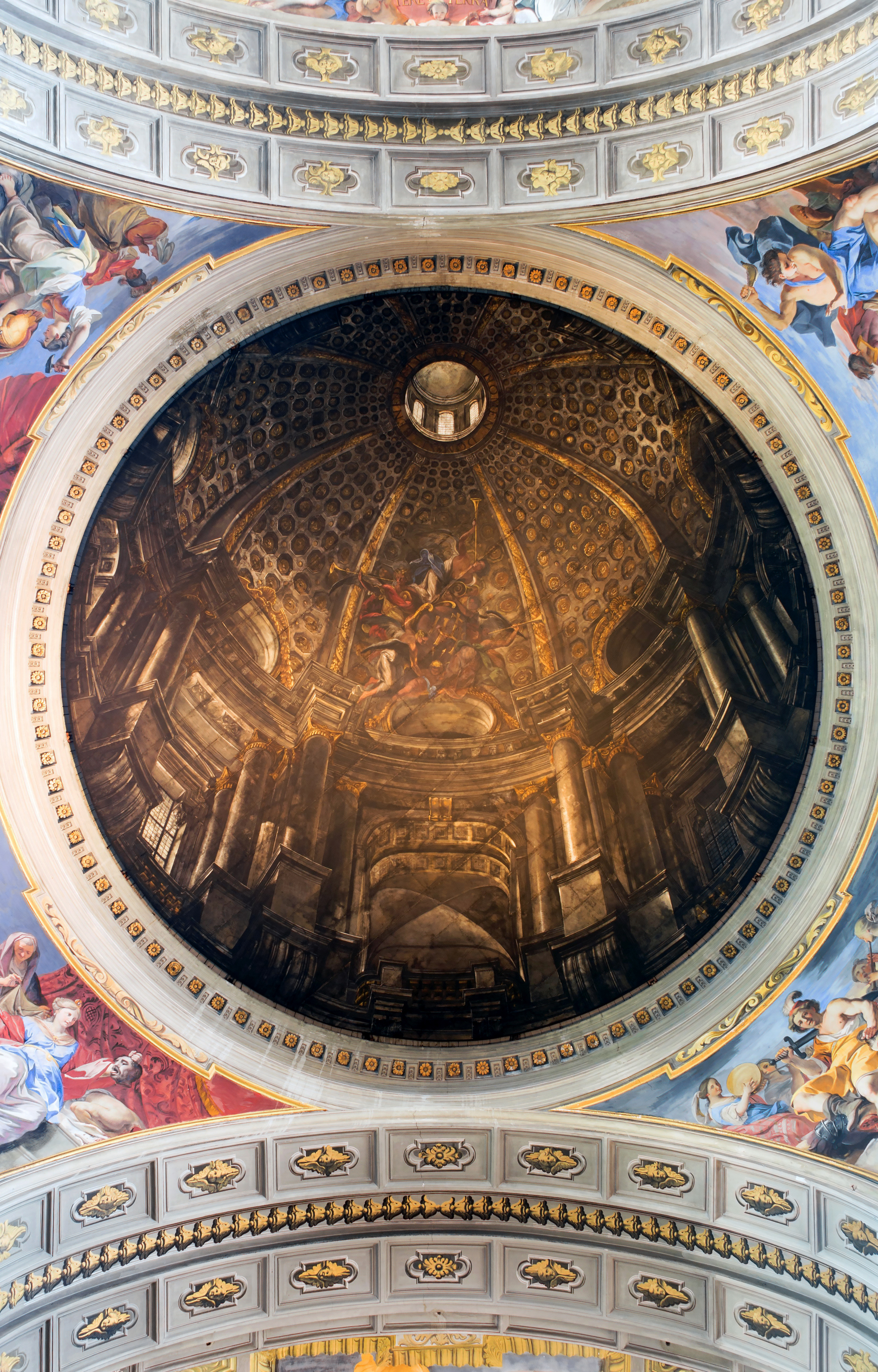
The illusionistic perspective of Andrea Pozzo's trompe-l'œil dome at Sant'Ignazio (1685) creates an illusion of an actual architectural space on what is, in actuality, a slightly concave painted surface.

Illusionistic ceiling painting, which includes the techniques of perspective di sotto in sù and quadratura, is the tradition in Renaissance, Baroque and Rococo art in which trompe-l'œil, perspective tools such as foreshortening, and other spatial effects are used to create the illusion of three-dimensional space on an otherwise two-dimensional or mostly flat ceiling surface above the viewer. It is frequently used to create the illusion of an open sky, such as with the oculus in Andrea Mantegna's Camera degli Sposi, or the illusion of an architectural space such as the cupola, one of Andrea Pozzo's frescoes in Sant'Ignazio, Rome. Illusionistic ceiling painting belongs to the general class of illusionism in art, designed to create accurate representations of reality, as well as the general class of painted ceilings.

== Di sotto in sù ==
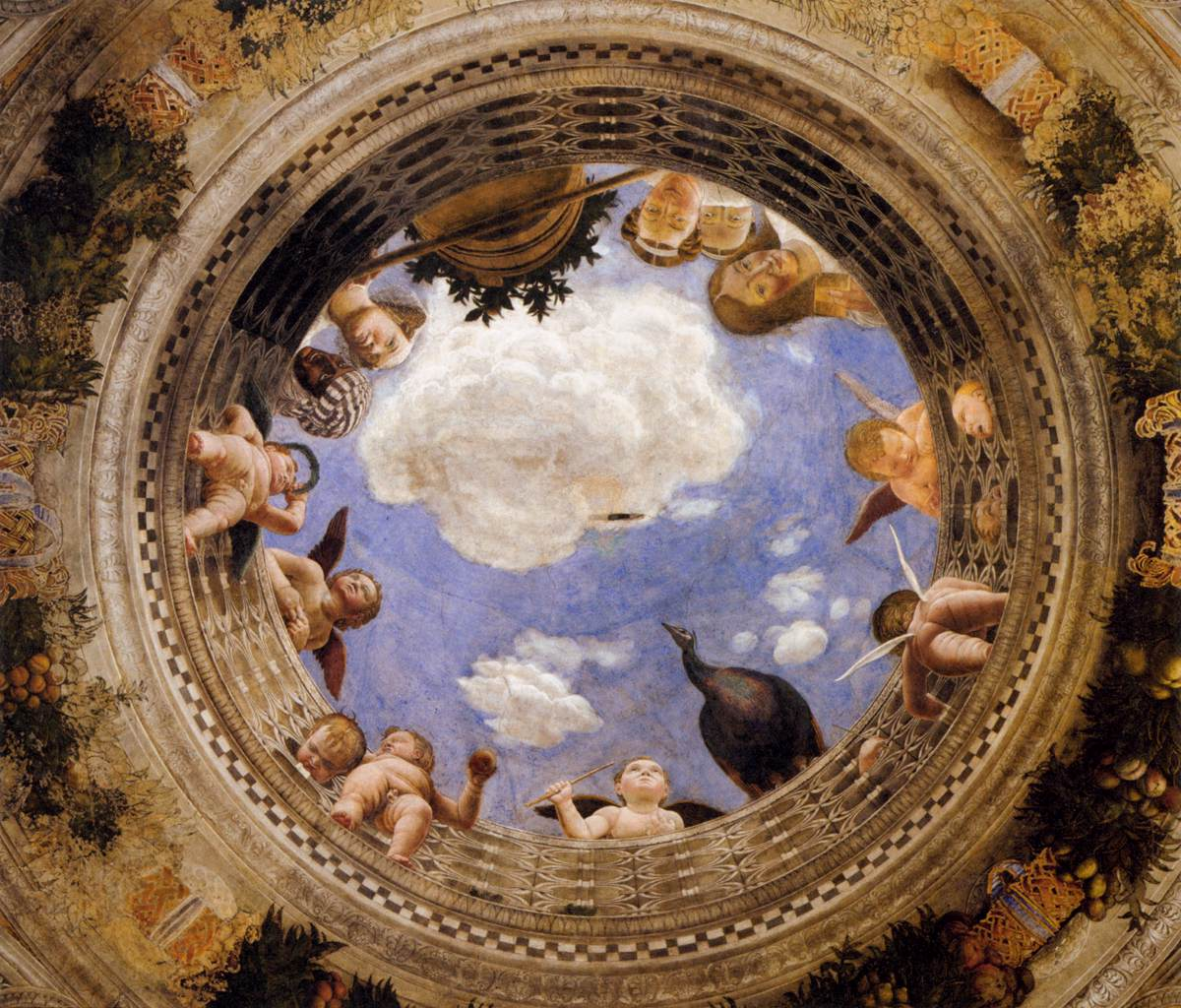
Andrea Mantegna, di sotto in sù ceiling fresco in the Camera degli Sposi of the Ducal palace, Mantua

Di sotto in sù (or sotto in su), which means "seen from below" or "from below, upward" in Italian, developed in late quattrocento Italian Renaissance painting, notably in Andrea Mantegna's Camera degli Sposi in Mantua and in frescoes by Melozzo da Forlì. Italian terminology for this technique reflects the latter artist's influence and is called prospettiva melozziana ("Melozzo's perspective"). Another notable use is by Antonio da Correggio in the Parma Cathedral, which foreshadows Baroque architectural grandeur.

The technique often uses foreshortened figures and an architectural vanishing point to create the perception of true space on a painted, most often frescoed, ceiling above the viewer.

== Quadratura ==
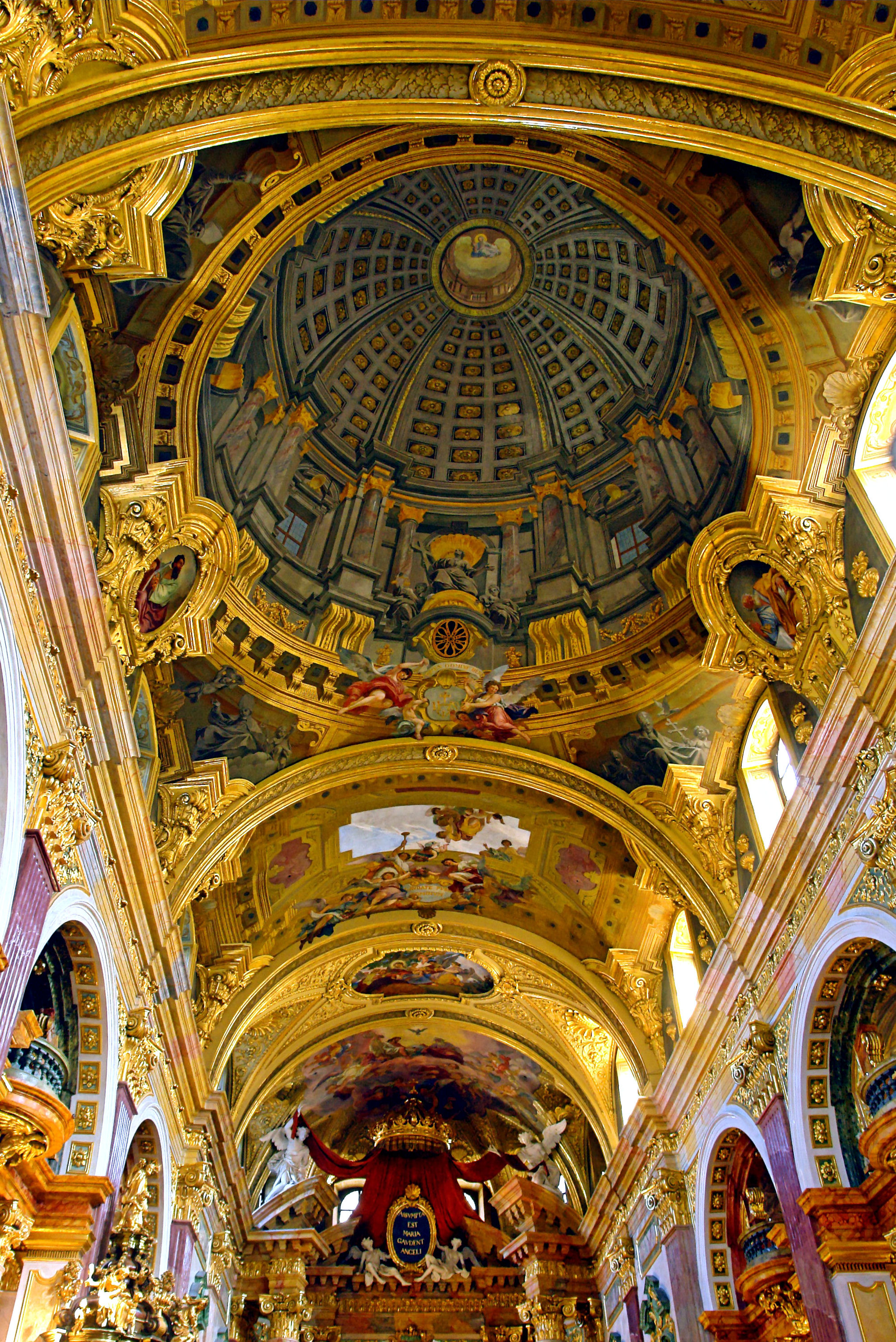
Ceiling of the Jesuit Church, Vienna by Andrea Pozzo (1703)

Quadratura, a term which was introduced in the seventeenth century and is also normally used in English, became popular with Baroque artists. Although it can also refer to the "opening up" of walls through architectural illusion, the term is most commonly associated with Italian ceiling painting. Unlike other trompe-l'œil techniques or precedent di sotto in sù ceiling decorations, which often rely on intuitive artistic approaches to deception, quadratura is directly tied to seventeenth-century theories of perspective and the representation of architectural space. Due to its reliance on perspective theory, it more fully unites architecture, painting and sculpture and gives a more overwhelming impression of illusionism than earlier examples.

The artist would paint a feigned architecture in perspective on a flat or barrel-vaulted ceiling in such a way that it seems to continue the existing architecture. The perspective of this illusion is centered towards one focal point. The steep foreshortening of the figures, and the painted walls and pillars were and are used to create an illusion of deep recession; a heavenly sphere or even an open sky. Paintings on ceilings could, for example, simulate statues in niches or openings revealing the sky.

Quadratura may also employ other illusionistic painting techniques, such as anamorphosis.

Examples of illusionistic painting include:

- Andrea Pozzo at Sant'Ignazio, Rome and the Jesuit Church, Vienna. He wrote the standard theoretical work of his artistic ideas in the two volumes of Perspectiva pictorum et architectorum Andreae Putei a societate Jesu (Rome, 1693–1700).
- Holy Cross Church in the town of Brzeg, Poland,
- Pietro da Cortona at the Palazzo Barberini,
- Gianbattista Tiepolo in the Ca' Rezzonico in Venice, Villa Pisani at Stra, and the throne room at the Royal Palace of Madrid.

Other examples were by Paolo Veronese at Villa Rotonda in Vicenza and Baldassare Peruzzi in the Villa Farnesina of Rome.

== Development ==
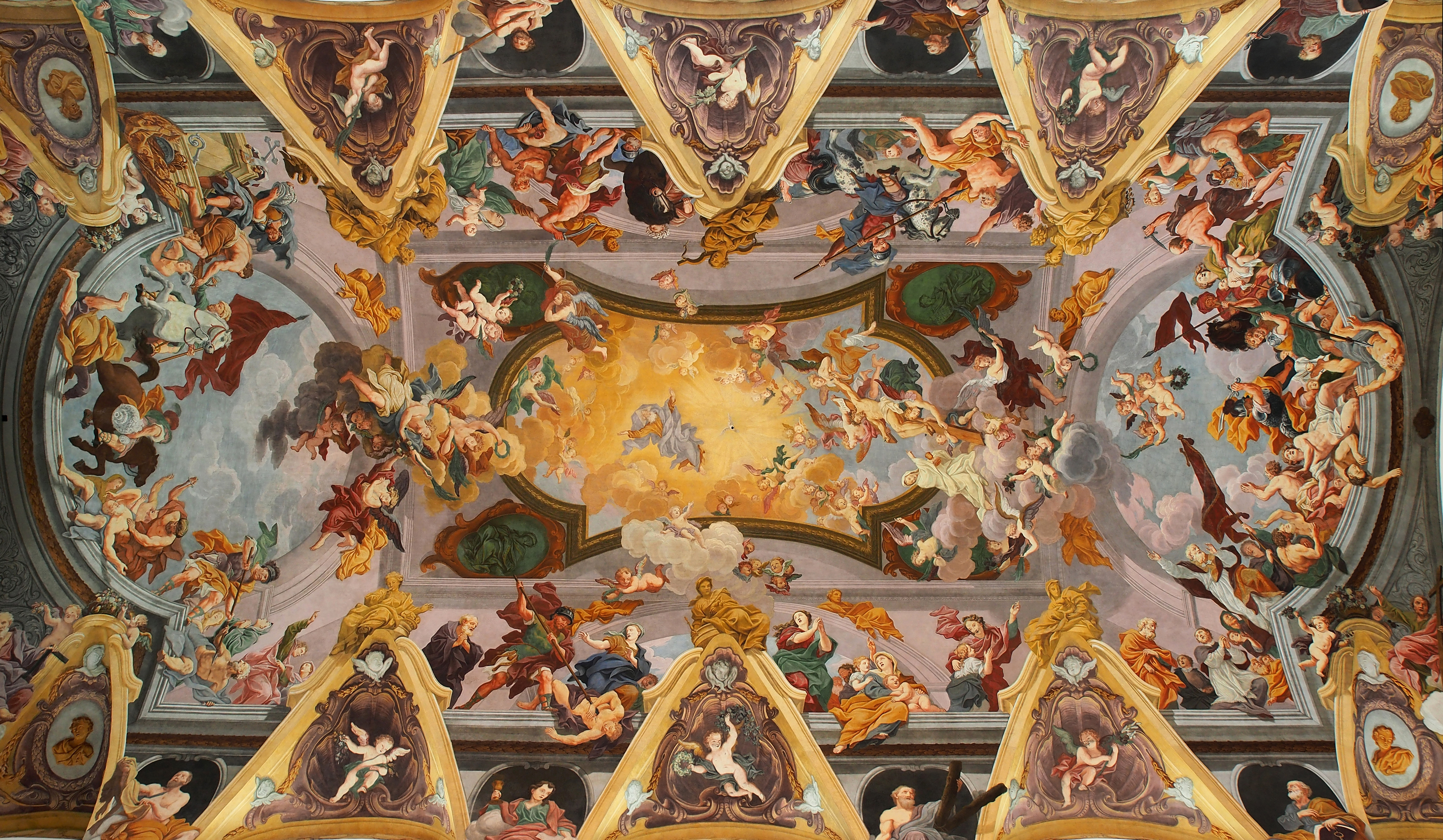
The ceiling in Ljubljana Cathedral, painted by Giulio Quaglio the Younger in 1705–06

Italian Renaissance artists applied their confidence in handling perspective to projects for ceilings and overcame the problems of applying linear perspective to the concave surfaces of domes in order to dissolve the architecture and create illusions of limitless space.

Painted and patterned ceilings were a Gothic tradition in Italy as elsewhere, but the first ceiling painted to feign open space was created by Andrea Mantegna, a master of perspective who went to Mantua as court painter to the Gonzaga. His masterpiece was a series of frescoes that culminated in 1474 in the Camera degli Sposi of the Ducal Palace. In these works, he carried the art of illusionistic perspective to new limits. He frescoed the walls with illusionistic scenes of court life, while the ceiling appeared as if it were an oculus open to the sky, with courtiers, a peacock, and putti leaning over a balustrade, seen in strongly foreshortened perspective from below;di sotto in sù. This was the prototype of illusionistic ceiling painting that was to become an important element of Italian Baroque art.

Correggio at Parma took the illusionistic ceiling a step farther in his frescoes of Christ and the Apostles for the cupola at the San Giovanni Evangelista and in the Assumption of the Virgin in the dome of the Parma Cathedral, which is Correggio's most famous work (1520–24); in these frescos Correggio treats the entire surface as the vast and frameless vault of heaven in which the figures float. In a visual continuity between the architectural interior and its painted surfaces, Corregio's clouds and figures appear to inhabit the same architectural space in which the spectator stands.

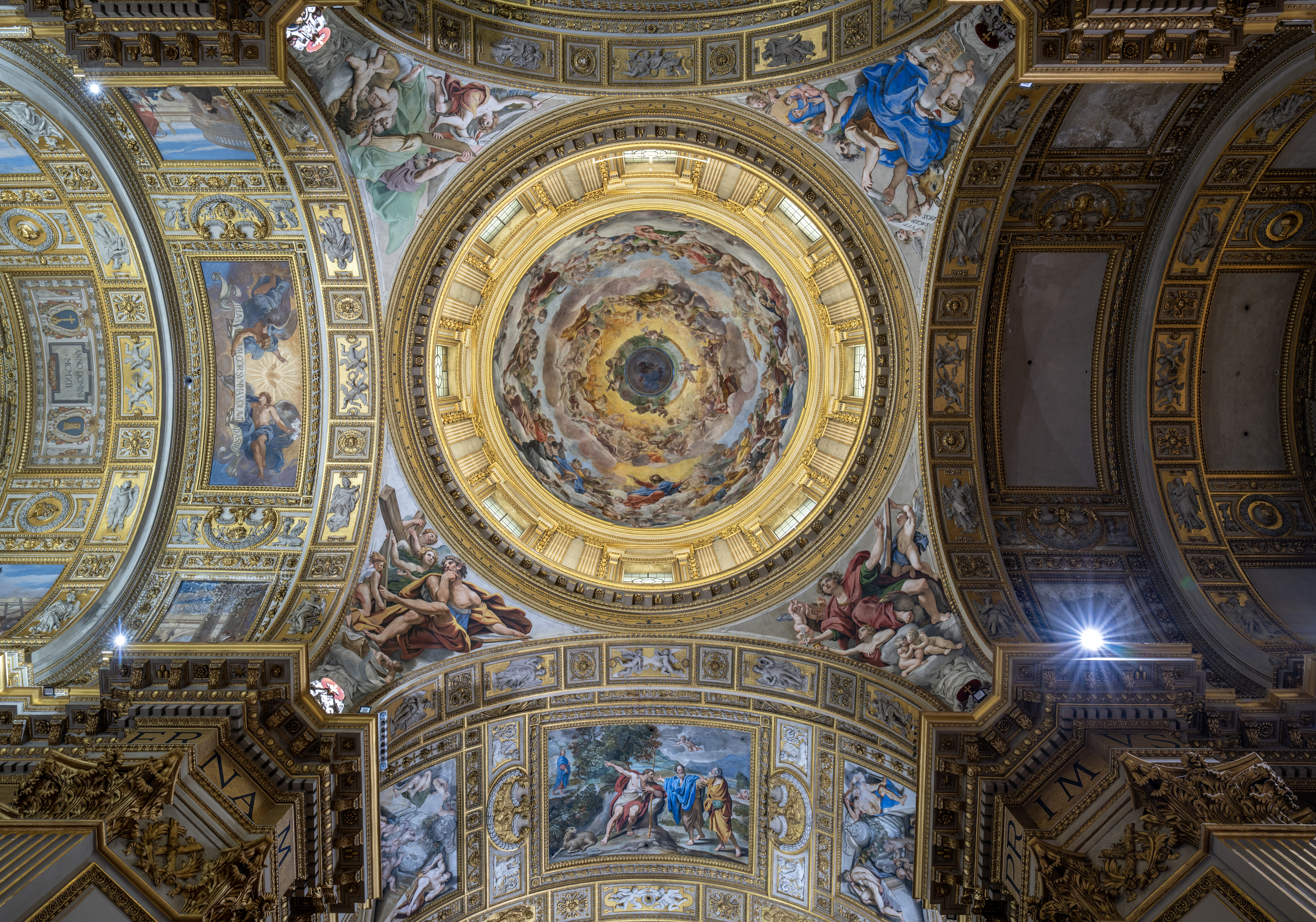
Dome of Sant'Andrea della Valle

In Baroque Rome, the long-standing tradition of frescoed ceilings received a push from the grand projects in Palazzo Farnese under the guidance of Annibale Carracci and his team, but the figural subjects were still enclosed within multiple framed compartments (quadri riportati), and the perspective of subjects seen from below was not consistently taken into consideration.

From 1625 to 1627 Giovanni Lanfranco, a native of Parma who knew Correggio's dome, painted the enormous dome of the church of Sant'Andrea della Valle with an Assumption of the Virgin that overwhelmed contemporary spectators with its exuberant illusionistic effects and became one of the first High Baroque masterpieces. Lanfranco's work in Rome (1613–1630) and in Naples (1634–1646) was fundamental to the development of illusionism in Italy.

Pietro Berrettini, called Pietro da Cortona, developed the illusionistic ceiling fresco to an extraordinary degree in works such as the ceiling (1633–1639) of the gran salone of Palazzo Barberini. From 1676 to 1679 Giovanni Battista Gaulli, called Baciccio, painted an Adoration of the Name of Jesus on the ceiling of the Church of the Gesù, the Jesuit headquarters in Rome. From 1691 to 1694 Andrea Pozzo painted the Entrance of Saint Ignatius into Paradise on the nave vault of Sant'Ignazio, Rome, with theatricality and emotion.

== See also ==
- The Loves of the Gods (Carracci)
- Johann Paul Schor
- Allegory of Divine Providence and Barberini Power (Cortona)
- Paul Troger, leading Austrian exponent of the 18th century
