= Jesuit Church, Vienna =

Church in Vienna, Austria

Jesuit Church
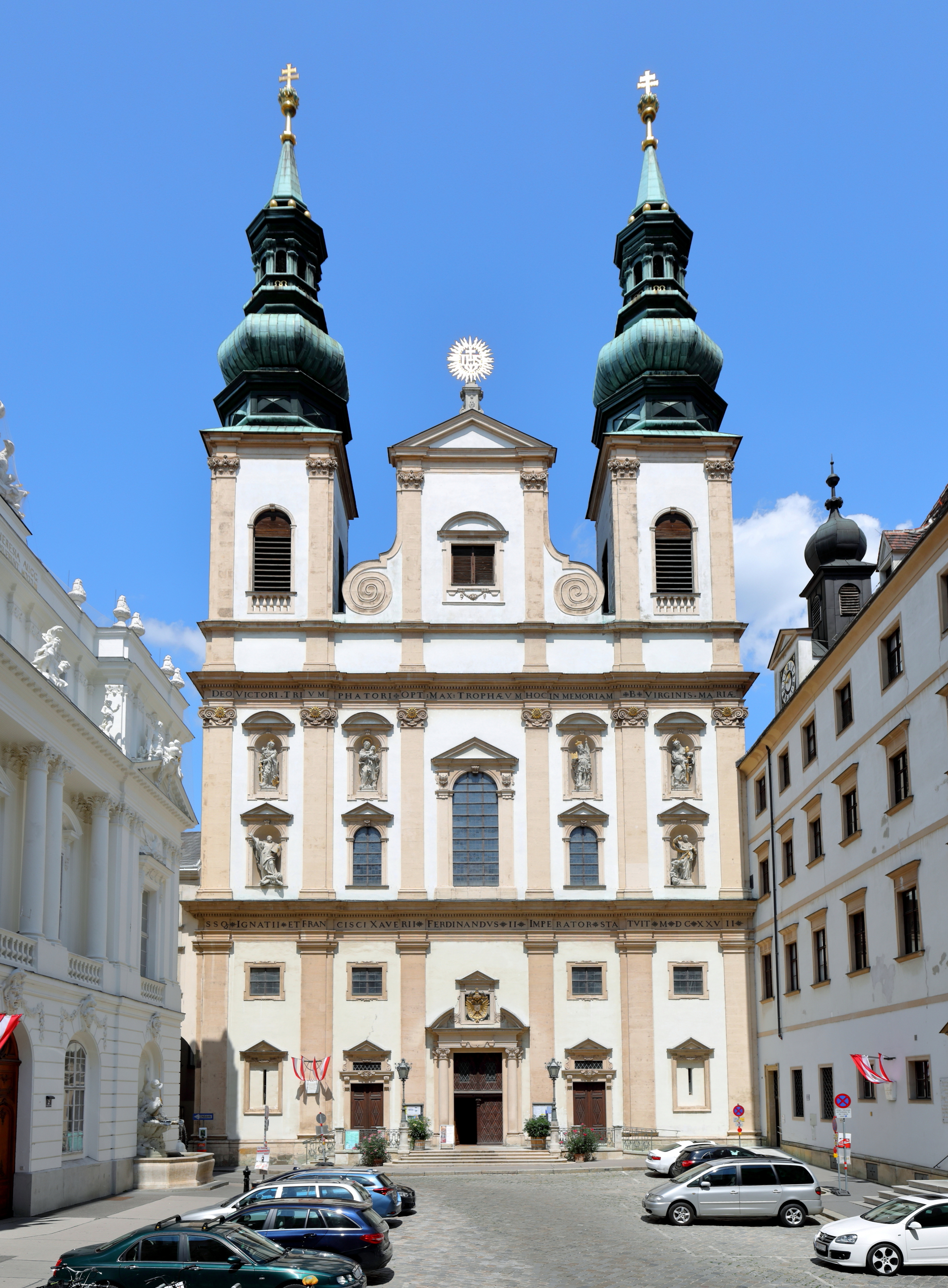
- Jesuit Church in Vienna, Austria

- Location within Vienna Location within Austria

Religion
- Affiliation: Catholic Church
- Leadership: P. Gustav Schörghofer, SJ
- Year consecrated: 1627

Location
- Location: Vienna, Austria
- State: Vienna
- Coordinates: 48.208972°N 16.377167°E

Architecture
- Architects: Brother Andrea Pozzo, S.J.
- Type: Church
- Style: Baroque
- Groundbreaking: 1623
- Completed: 1627

Specifications
- Direction of façade: SWS
- Length: 55 m (180 ft)
- Width: 25 m (82 ft)
- Width (nave): 13 m (42.7 ft)

Website
- jesuitenkirche-wien.at

The Jesuit Church (German: Jesuitenkirche), also known as the University Church (German: Universitätskirche), is a two-floor, double-tower church in Vienna, Austria. Influenced by early Baroque principles, the church was remodeled by Andrea Pozzo between 1703 and 1705. The Jesuit Church is located on Dr. Ignaz Seipel-Platz, immediately adjacent to the old University of Vienna buildings.

== History ==
The Jesuit Church was built between 1623 and 1627 on the site of an earlier chapel, at the time when the Jesuits merged their own college with the University of Vienna's philosophy and theology faculty. The emperor broke ground for both college and church, with the church itself dedicated to Saints Ignatius Loyola and Francis Xavier.

In 1703, Brother Andrea Pozzo, S.J., an architect, painter, and sculptor, and a master in the quadratura, was requested by Emperor Leopold I to redecorate the church. He added twin towers and reworked the façade in an early Baroque style with narrow horizontal and vertical sections. The design of the windows, narrow niches (with statues), and the small central part of the façade deviate from the Baroque style of the towers. Pozzo died unexpectedly in 1709, just before he was to move to Venice, and was buried in the church.

After the completion of the work, the church was re-dedicated to the Assumption of Mary.

== Interior ==
Despite its relatively austere exterior, the interior is remarkably opulent with ersatz marble pillars, gilding and a number of allegorical ceiling frescoes. The semicircular vault ceiling was divided in four bays with paintings in perspective, using illusionary techniques. Executed by Andrea Pozzo in 1703, the remarkable trompe-l'œil dome, painted on a flat part of the ceiling, is a masterpiece.

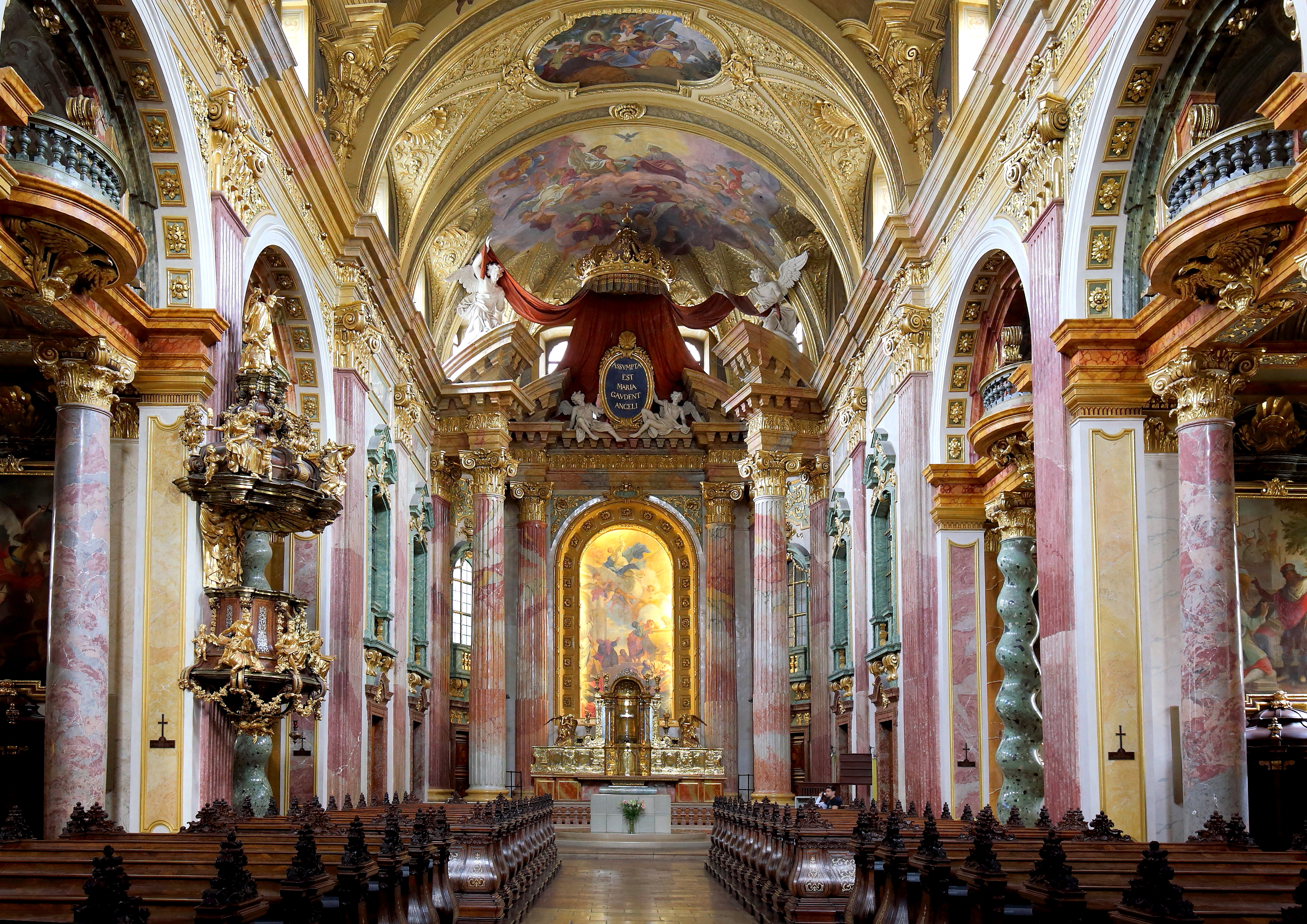
Interior of Jesuit Church

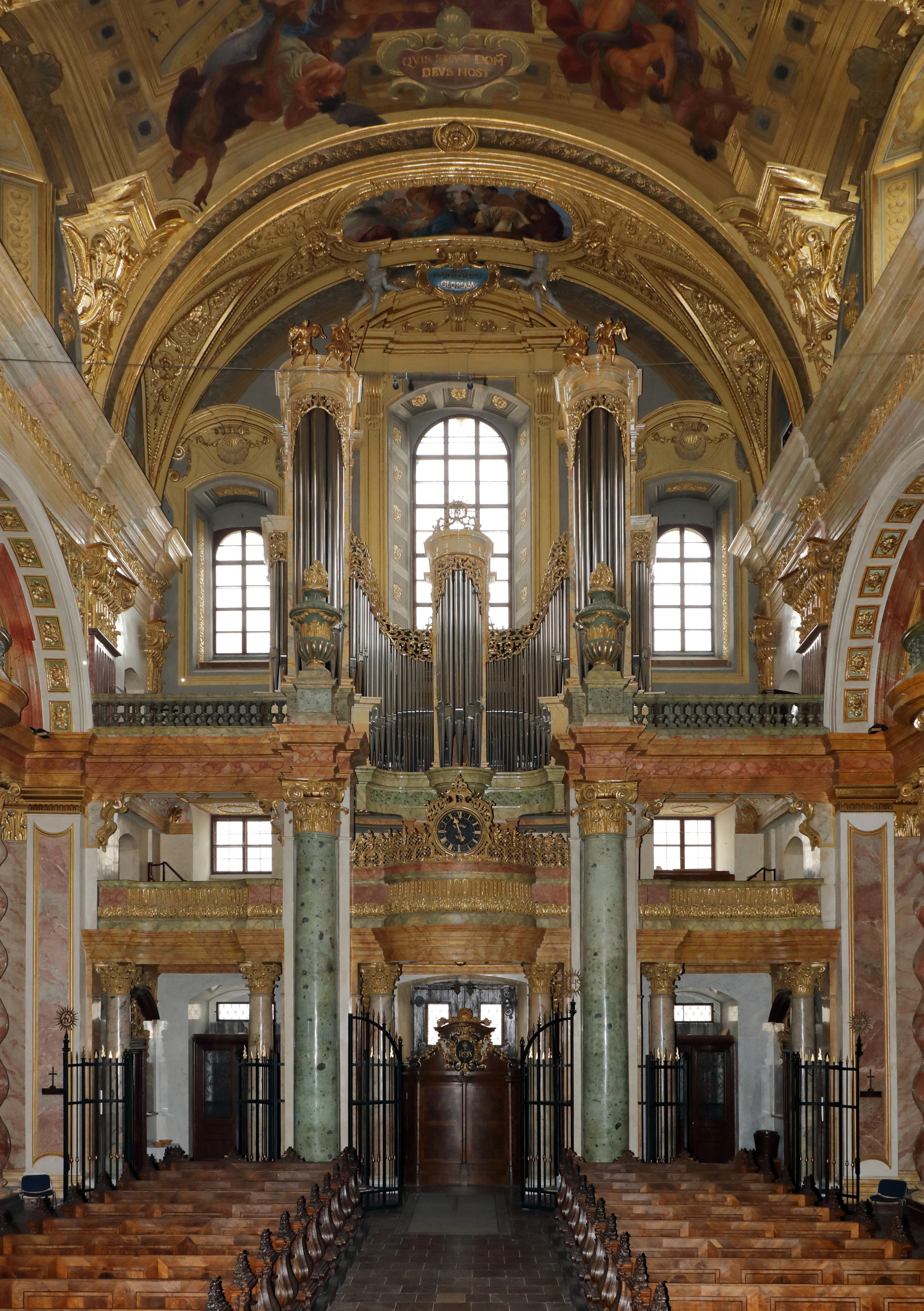
Organ loft

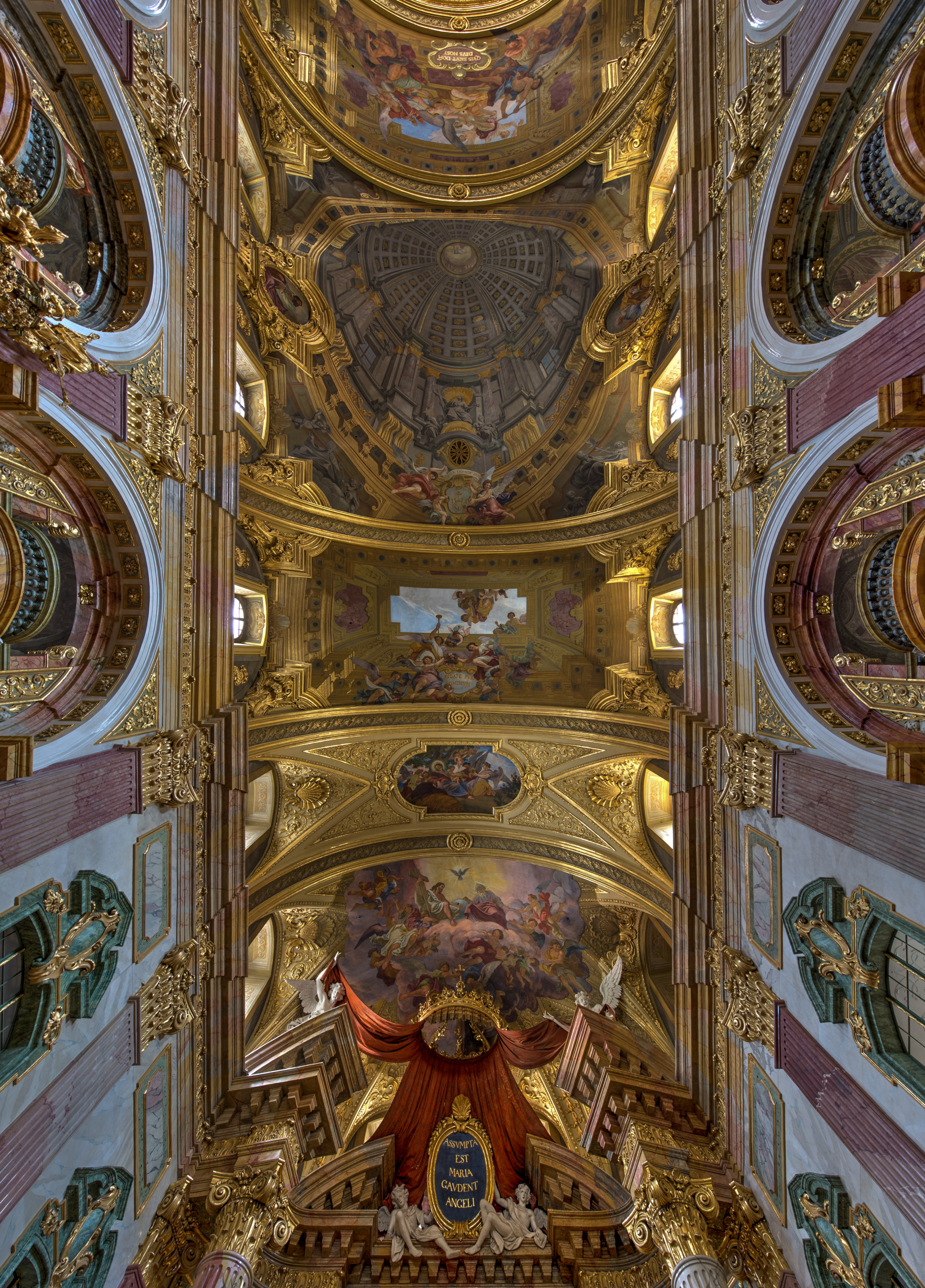
Fresco with trompe-l'œil dome by Andrea Pozzo

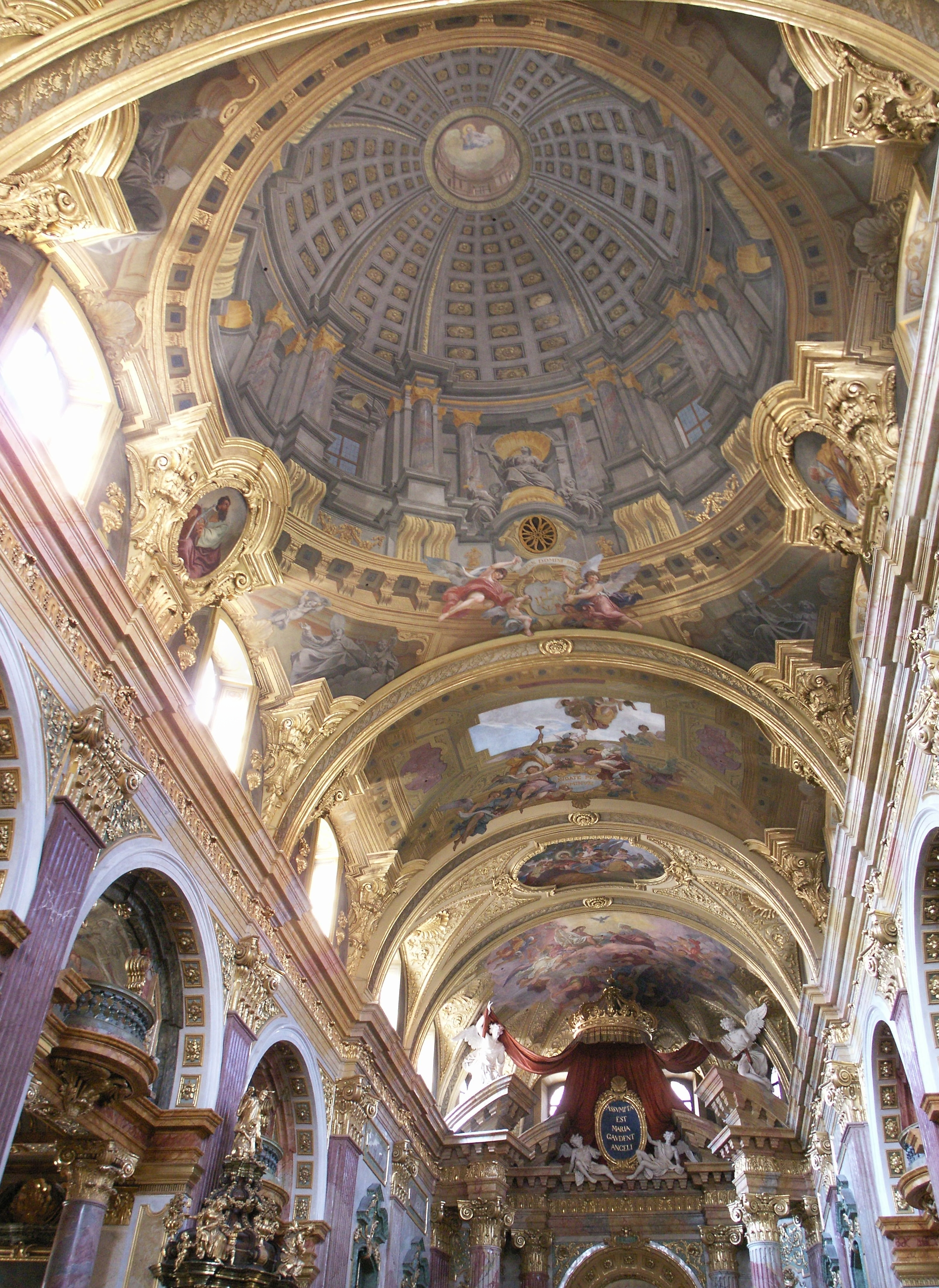
Ceiling view from the entrance

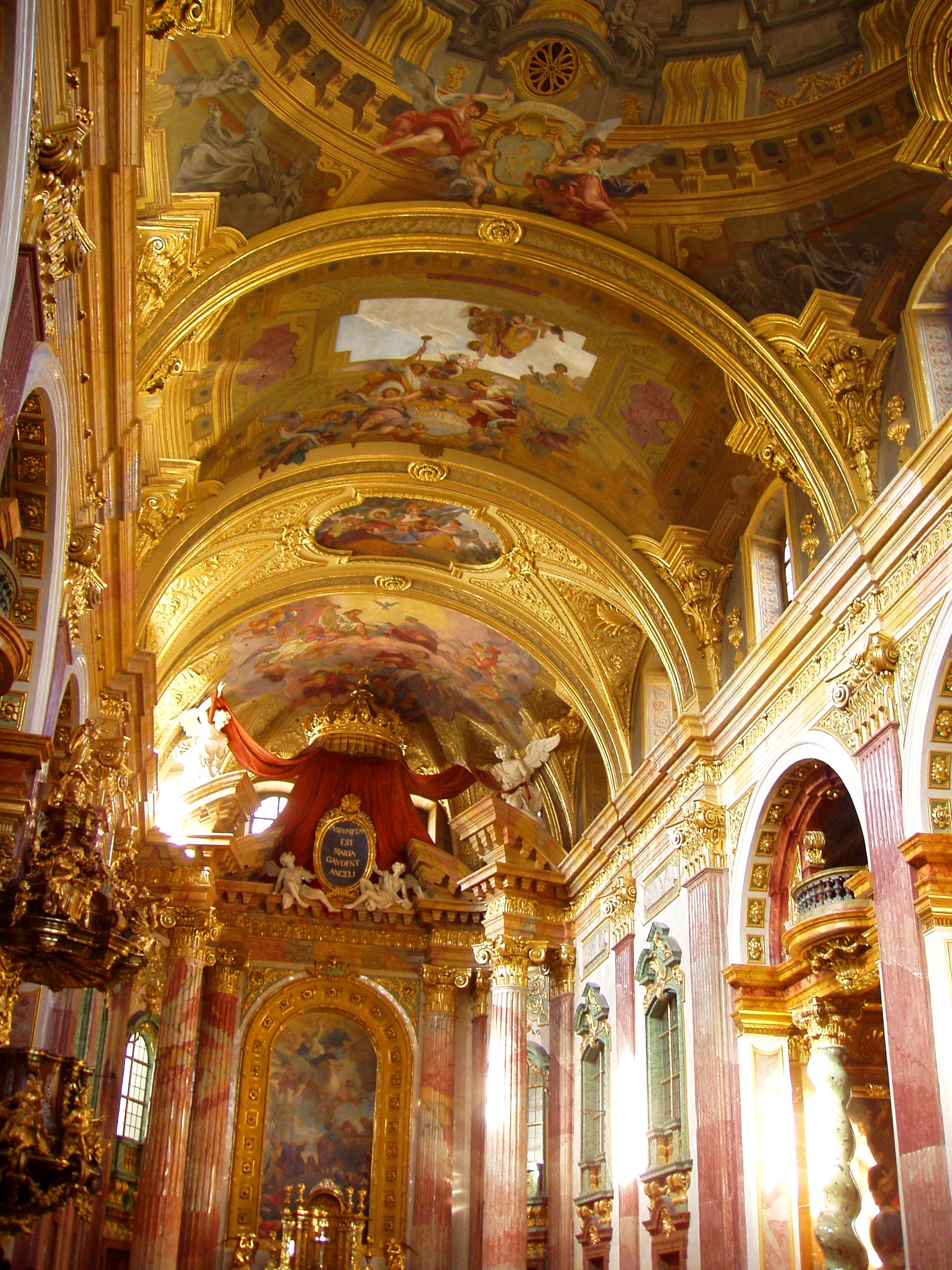
General view of interior

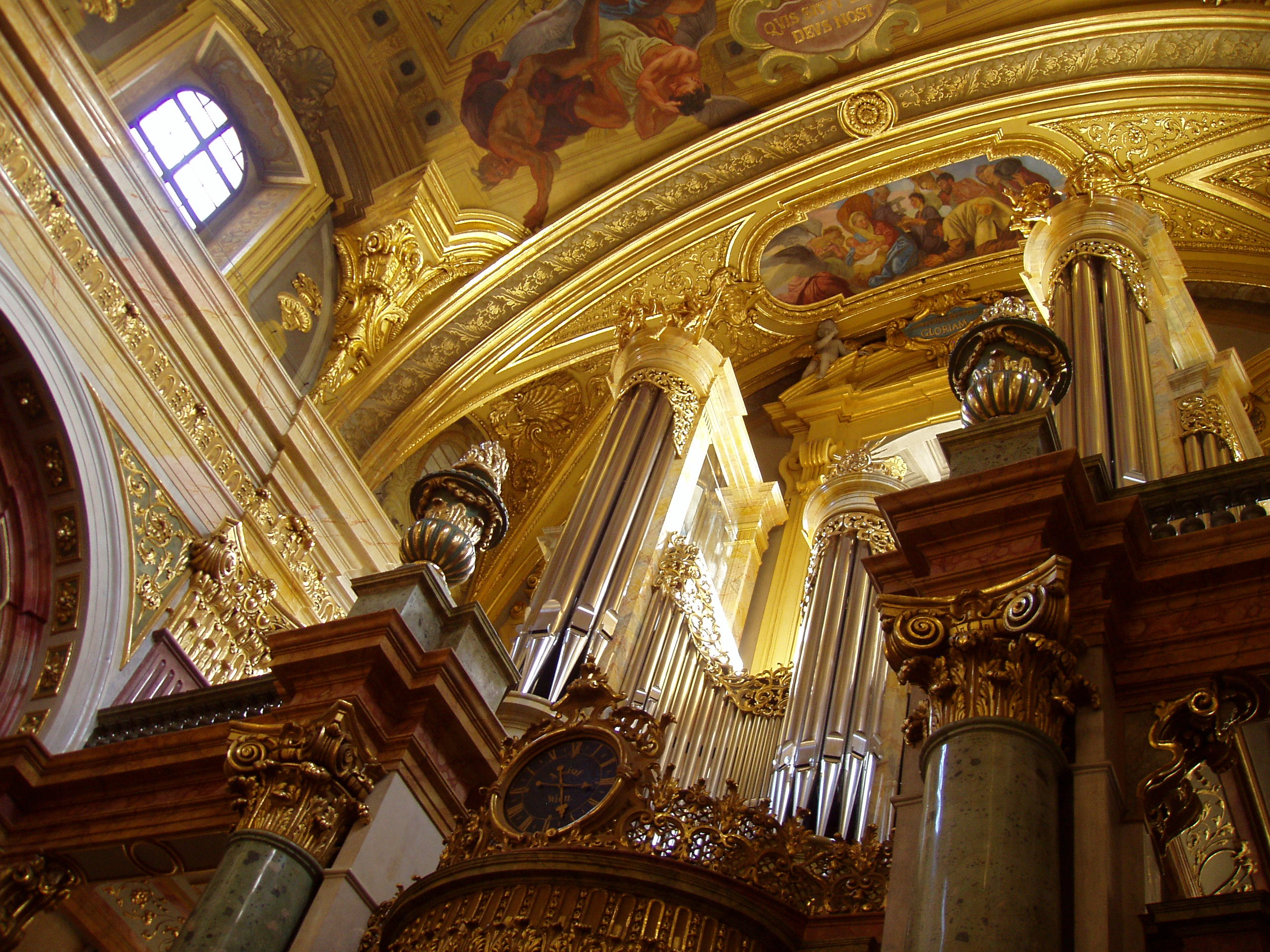
Interior detail with organ

Immediately adjacent is the Aula (great hall) of the Vienna's university, where Beethoven's Seventh Symphony had its premiere.

== See also ==
- List of Jesuit sites
