= Sebastiano Cipriani =

Italian architect

Sebastiano Cipriani (1662–1738) was an Italian architect active in the late-Baroque period mainly in Rome.

== Biography ==
He was born in Siena, but moved to Rome in 1683 to work in the studio of Carlo Rainaldi. He worked with Rainaldi in 1686-1690 in the completion of the Palazzo Mancini in Via del Corso Rome. His proposal for the main altar to the titular saint in Sant'Ignazio was not adopted, instead the design of Andrea Pozzo was selected. Cipriani was active in the design of funeral catafalques for prominent figures. He helped complete, along with Giovanni Battista Contini, the Oratory of San Filippo in Macerata. He died in Rome.
