= Santa Rita da Cascia in Campitelli =

Church building in Rome, Italy

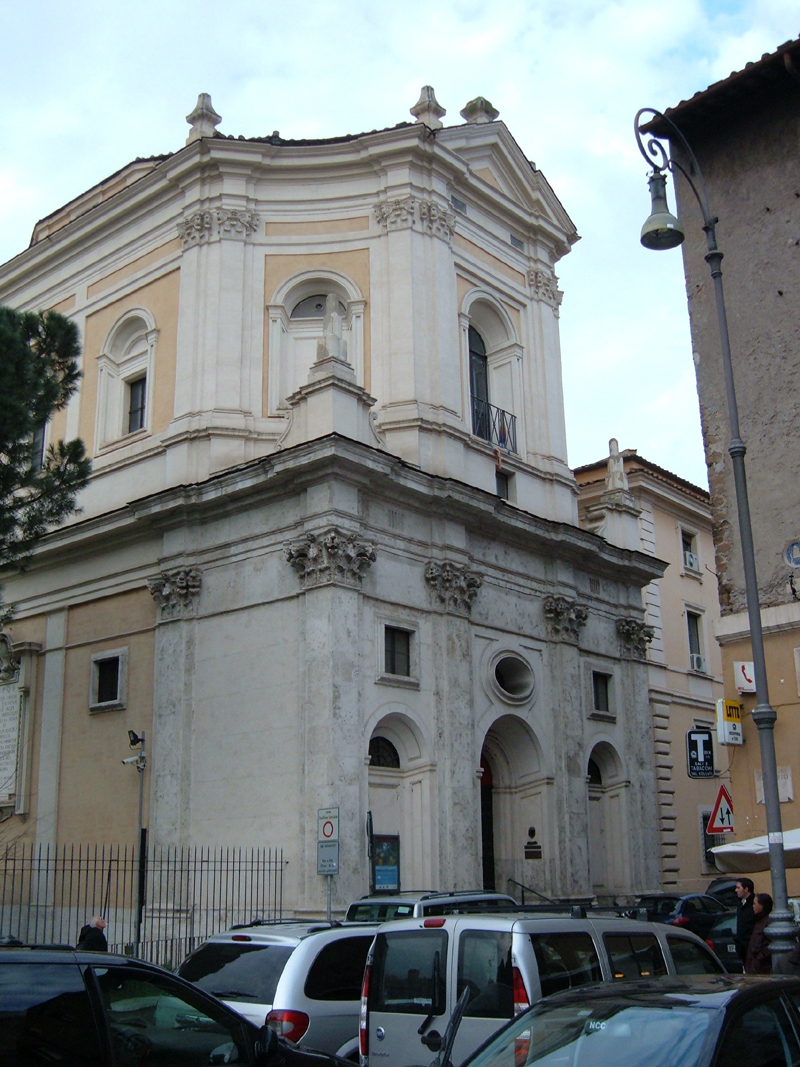
- Facade
- Click on the map for a fullscreen view
- 41°53′33″N 12°28′48″E
- Location: Rome
- Country: Italy
- Denomination: Roman Catholic

History
- Consecrated: 1643

Architecture
- Architect: Carlo Fontana
- Architectural type: Church
- Style: Baroque

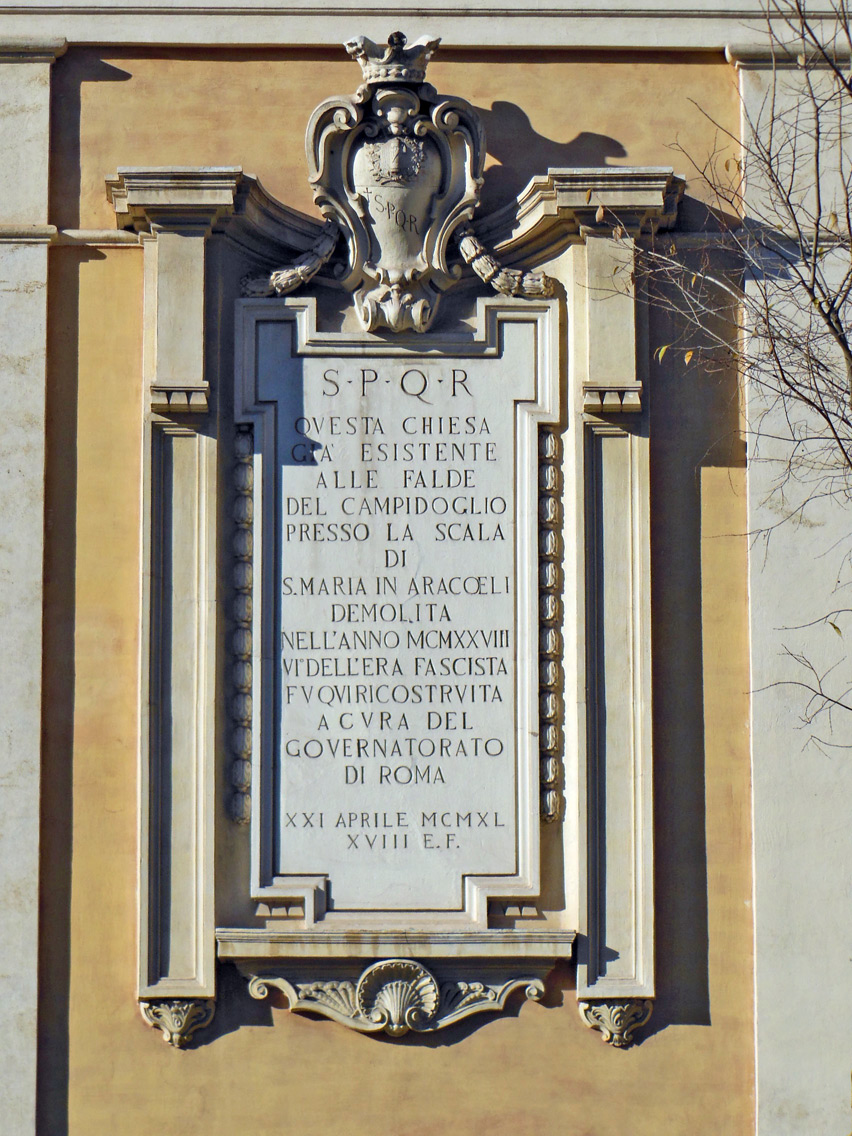
The plaque on the left side of the church, commemorating the relocation

The Chiesa di Santa Rita da Cascia in Campitelli is a deconsecrated church in Rome (Italy), in the rione Sant'Angelo; it is located in Via Montanara, at the crossroad with Via del Teatro Marcello. The church formerly rose on the preexisting church of San Biagio de Mercato, dating at least to the 11th-century. The remains of St Blaise putatively were discovered during the dismantling of Santa Rita.

== History ==
The church was built in 1643 by architect Carlo Fontana in place of a former church, built by the family Bucabella in the 11th century, and rose at the base of the staircase of Santa Maria in Aracoeli, on its left side. It was dedicated to Saint Blaise. Pope Alexander VII entrusted the church to the brotherhood of the Holy Thorn of the Cross of Jesus. It became property of a confraternity of individuals from Cascia, who advocated for the veneration of the then blessed Rita. The codedication to Saint Rita of Cascia, in addition of Saint Blaise, was added only in 1900, the year of her canonization.

In 1928, as a consequence of the demolitions in the area to make space to the Via del Mare (now Via del Teatro di Marcello), the church was dismantled piece by piece and deposited with the aim of rebuilding it in the same place. Nonetheless, in 1940 the church was rebuilt in its present location, as remembered by a commemorative stone on the left side of the building.

Questa chiesa già esistente alle falde del Campidoglio presso la scala di S. Maria in Aracoeli demolita nell'anno 1928, VI dell'era fascista, fu qui ricostruita a cura del Governatorato di Roma. 21 aprile 1940 XVIII E.F.

(This church, already existing at the slopes of the Capitoline Hill close to the staircase of S. Maria in Aracoeli, demolished in the year 1928, VI of the fascist era, was rebuilt here by Rome Governorate. April 21st 1940. XVIII E.F.)

The church is now deconsecrated and used for meetings, conferences and concerts.

== Description ==
The façade is decorated with lesenes and stuccoes. The interior is on the Greek cross plan with a convex rhomboidal map, like the one of San Carlo alle Quattro Fontane. The apse, deeper than the side chapels, still houses the baroque altar made of polychrome marbles and a stained glass window depicting Saint Rita of Cascia. The dome is in the middle.

Other churches highly influenced by Borromini's San Carlino include Church of the Gesù, Montepulciano and the Church of the Abbey of the Holy Spirit at Monte Morrone, Sulmona.

== Bibliography ==
- F. Titi, Descrizione delle Pitture, Sculture e Architetture esposte in Roma, Rome 1763
- M. Armellini, Le chiese di Roma dal secolo IV al XIX, Rome 1891
- C. Hulsen, Le chiese di Roma nel Medio Evo, Florence 1927
- Anna Maria Affanni, Demolizione e ricostruzione della Chiesa di S. Rita da Cascia in Gli anni del Governatorato (1926-1944), pp. 131–137, Collana Quaderni dei monumenti, Rome, Edizioni Kappa, 1995. ISBN 88-7890-181-4.
- M. Quercioli, Rione XI S. Angelo, in AA.VV, I rioni di Roma, Newton & Compton Editori, Milano 2000, Vol. II, pp. 726–765.
- C. Rendina, Le Chiese di Roma, Newton & Compton Editori, Milan 2000, p. 324.
