= Orange Garden, Rome =

Garden in Rome, Italy with excellent views of the city

Coordinates: 41.8851°N 12.4804°E

Giardino degli aranci
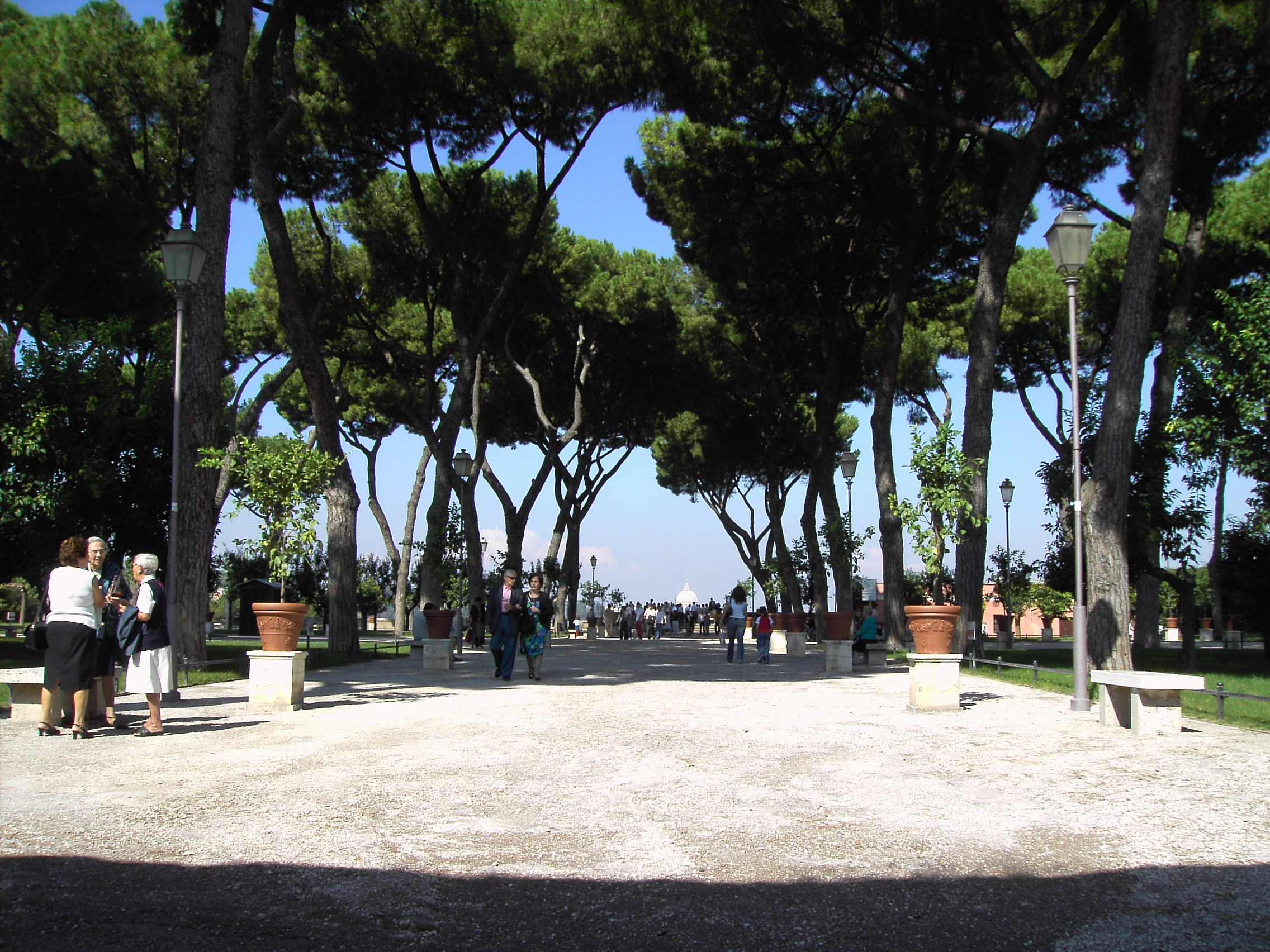
- Click on the map for a fullscreen view
- Type: Urban park
- Nearest city: Rome

The Orange Trees Garden (Italian: Giardino degli aranci) is the name used in Rome to describe the Parco Savello. It is about 7,800 square meters and is located on the Aventine Hill. The park offers an excellent view of the city. The garden, as it is today, was designed in 1932 by Raffaele De Vico. It was constructed to offer public access to the view from the side of the hill, creating a new ‘’belvedere’’, to be added to the existing viewpoints in Rome from the Pincian Hill and the Janiculum.

== History ==
The garden, whose name comes from the many bitter orange trees growing there, extends over the area of an ancient fortress built near the basilica of Santa Sabina by the Savelli family between 1285 and 1287, which, in turn, was built over an old castle constructed by the Crescentii in the tenth century. The garden is bordered by a wall that once surrounded the Savelli castle and other remains of the castle can also be still seen.

Orange trees and the terrace at the Orange Garden, Rome

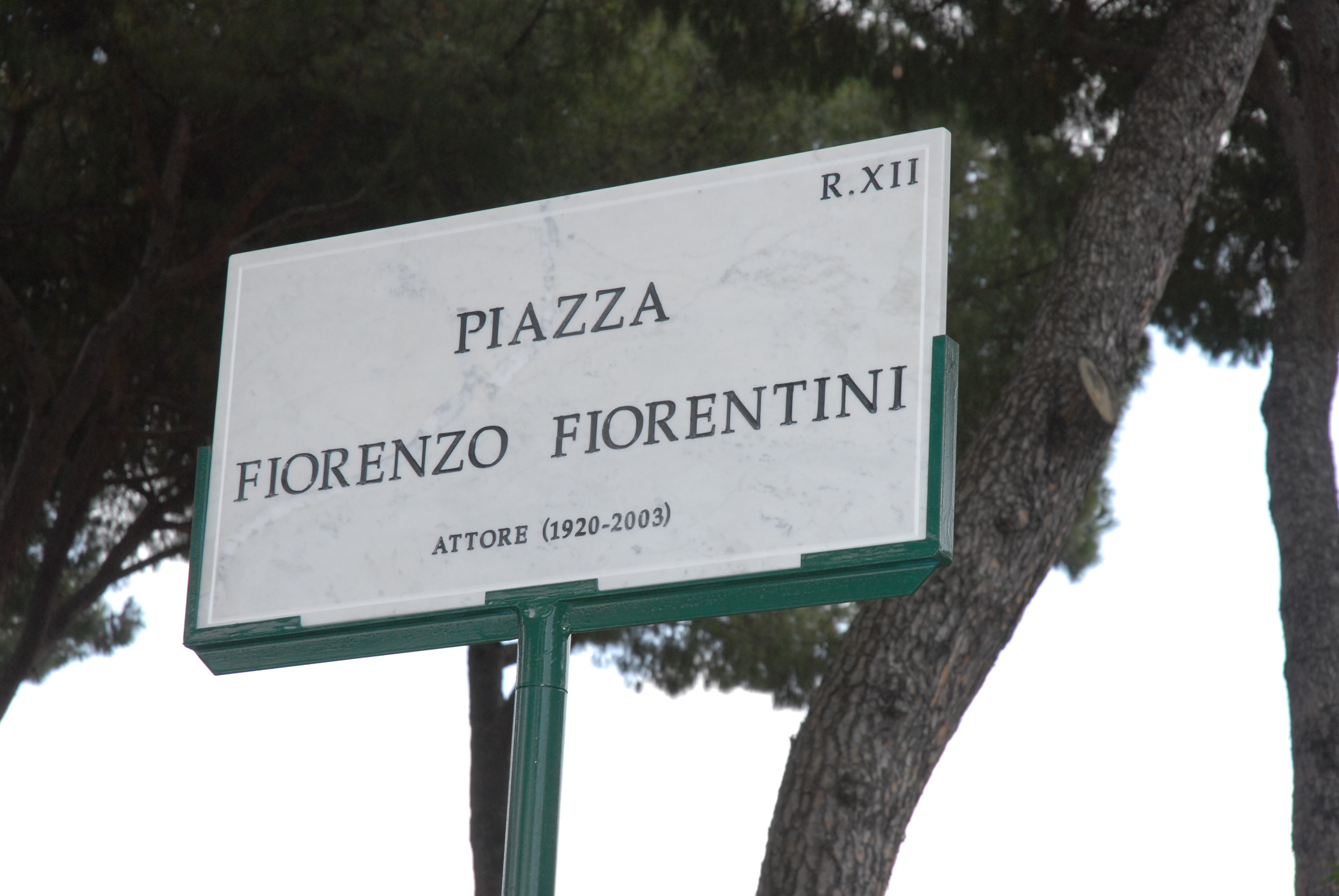
The street sign commemorating Fiorenzo Fiorentini

The castle was later given to the Dominican Order from Santa Sabina, which transformed it into a monastery, and the small park into a vegetable garden. According to legend Saint Dominic gave the garden its first orange tree, after transporting a sapling from Spain. Legend also tells that Saint Catherine of Siena picked the oranges from this tree and made candied fruit, which she gave to Pope Urban VI.

== Modern park ==
Fountain at the entrance to the Orange Garden

The garden setting is very symmetrical, with a central avenue aligned with the viewpoint, and later named in honour of the actor Nino Manfredi. The central square is named after another Roman actor, Fiorenzo Fiorentini, who for many years led the ongoing summer theatre season in the park.

The fountain at the entrance in Piazza Pietro D'Illiria is made up of two separate pieces: a Roman thermal bath, and a monumental marble mask originally carved to adorn a fountain built in 1593 by Giacomo della Porta for a cattle market (Campo Vaccino) in the centre of Rome. The mask has a long history. After the dismantling in 1816 of the Campo Vaccino fountain, it was recovered and from 1827 used to decorate a fountain erected on the right bank of the Tiber. This fountain was demolished in 1890 and the sculpture was kept in municipal warehouses until being moved to its present location.

== Panorama ==
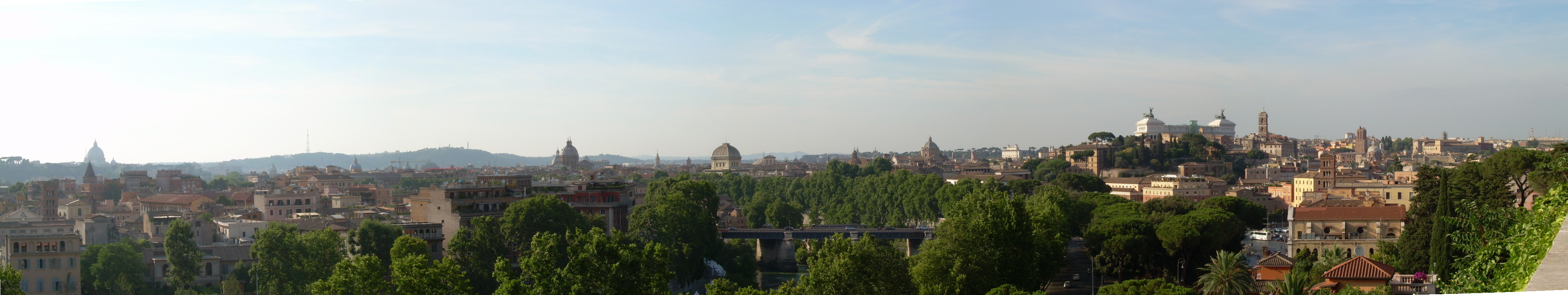
View from the Orange Trees Garden, 2007.

== See also ==
- List of parks and gardens in Rome
