= Diocesan museum of Ascoli Piceno, Italy =

Museo Diocesano
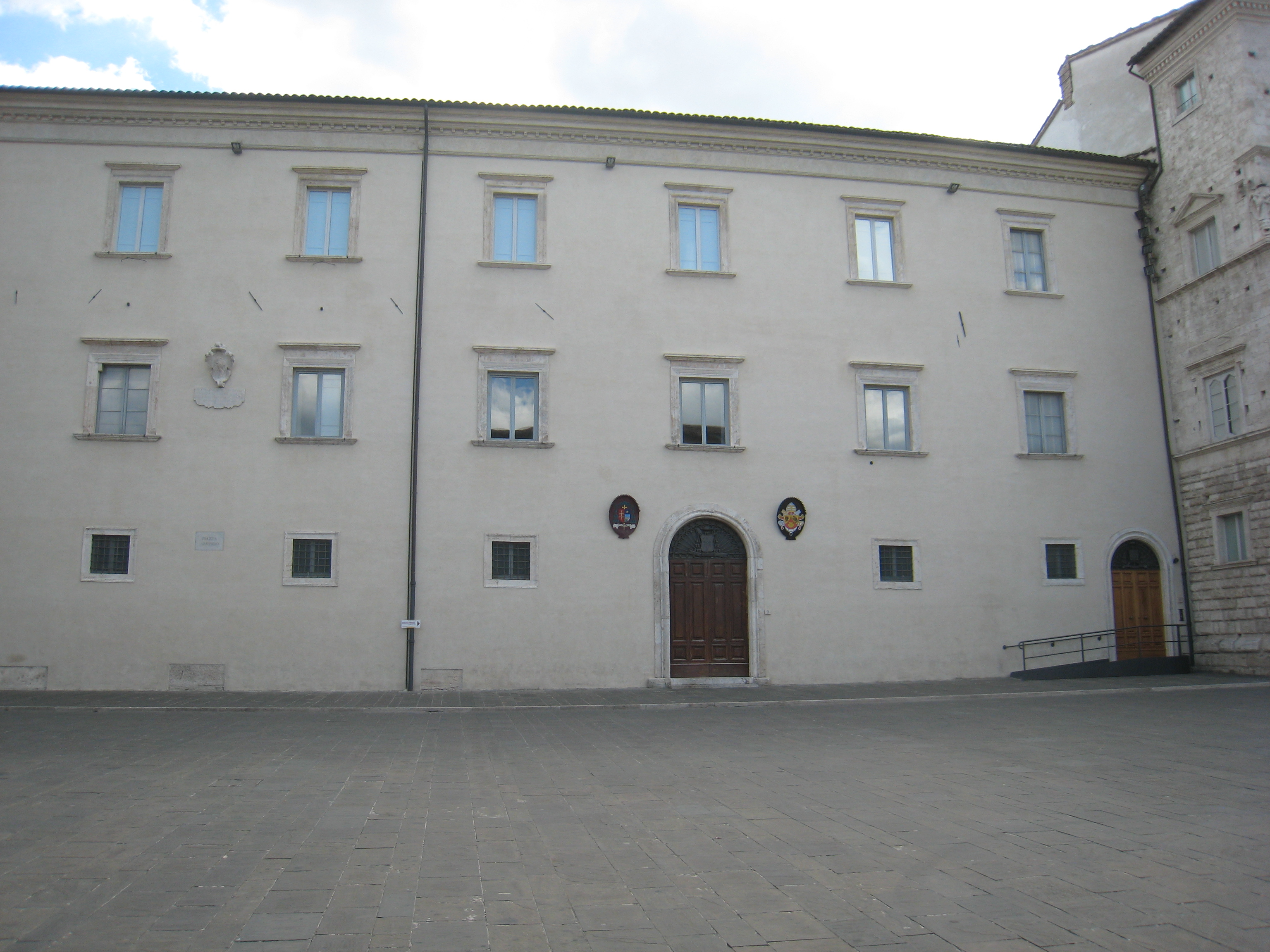
- Location: Palazzo Vescovile, Ascoli Piceno, Italy
- Type: art museum palazzo museum religious museum
- Visitors: 2,000 (2018)
- Website: Official website

The Diocesan Museum in the Italian town of Ascoli Piceno is located in one wing of the ecclesiastical palazzo, which also contains the city's pinacoteca and the state archeological museum.

Created with the aim of reuniting and preserving as much of the artistic patrimony of the diocese of Ascoli-Piceno as possible, the museum was opened in 1961 by bishop Marcello Morgante. The space consists of seven areas that house wooden and stone sculpture, paintings on canvas and wood, silver and sacred vestments made by the minor schools of the city that had a notable growth in the 1400s. There is also notable Florentine art of the 16th century. Many of the objects come directly from the city of Ascoli, while others were recovered from elsewhere in the diocesan territory. As a whole, the collection includes works from the 13th century to the present day.

== Rooms in the Museum ==
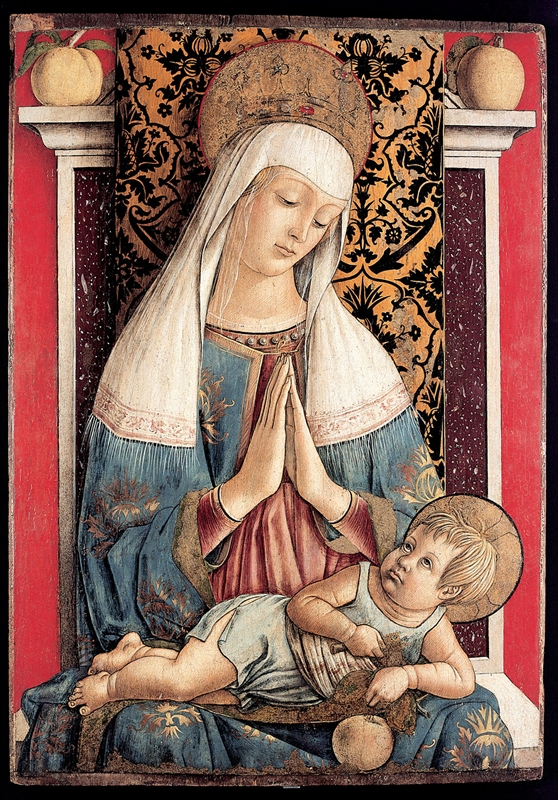
Carlo Crivelli, The Madonna of Poggio Bretta (c.1472)

- The entrance contains a terracotta polychrome cross dated to between 1430 and 1450;
- The gallery runs through the entire museum space and contains numerous objects made with precious metals. Of note are: a processional cross from a local shop made prior to the 16th century and showing a clear influence of the Abruzzo-Sulmona region; a wooden box with ivory decoration that represents the parable of The wise and foolish virgins; a portrait of Girolamo Bernerio by Venceslao Correggioli; two silver statues, one of Saint Emidio by Pietro Vannini, and the other of the Madonna of Loreto from the 17th century by goldsmith Curzio Compagni of Florence;
- Room 1 contains mostly paintings from the Venetian painter Carlo Crivelli, who was active in the region of Ascoli from 1468, and his most important student, Pietro Alamanno. Among the works by Crivelli is the Madonna of Poggio Bretta made between 1470 and 1472, and by Alamanno is the tavola cuspidata of 1485, brought here from Cerreto di Venarotta. Also found here is an interesting antependium textured with silk and gold thread from the end of the 15th century which comes from the cathedral of Ascol.
- Room 2 contains painted works by Cola dell'Amatrice among which is a panel painting of Saint Victor from 1517.
- Rooms 3 and 4 contain Baroque works among which are paintings by Carlo Allegretti, Ludovico Trasi, and Nicola Monti of the Miracle of Christ from the 18th century.
- Room 5 (known as the Room of Eden) was the residence of the Vicar General of Ascoli and its name comes from the columns of travertine that represent Adam and Eve. Also found here are the Arm-reliquary of Saint Emygdius made by Pietro Vannini in the 15th century, several Baroque paintings, and a 15th-century coffered ceiling decorated with rosettes.

== Specific Highlights ==
=== St. Emygdius statue by Pietro Vannini ===
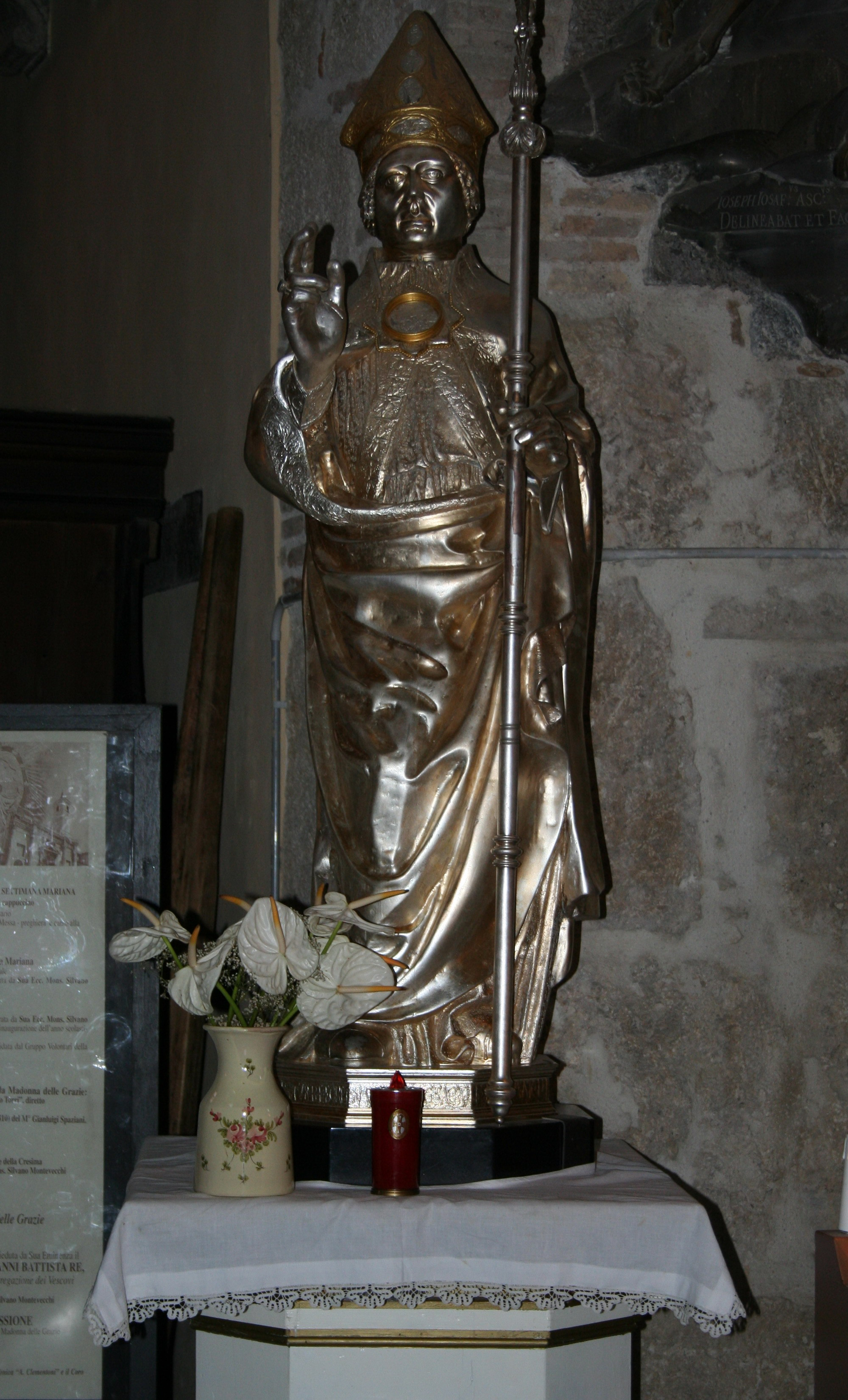
A silver statue of Saint Emygdius in the Cathedral of Ascoli Piceno similar to the one by Pietro Vannini

This statue was made in 1482, the year that Pope Sixtus IV granted «libertas ecclesiastica» to the city of Ascoli. On the octagonal base of the statue is written: «Ex quo libertas porta est asculea cumque iustitia rutilans ensis in urbe sumptibus hoc sacre residentum atque ere catedre Petri et Francisci celte refulget opus». The inscription contains the names of both Peter (which refers to Peter Vannini) and Francis (which refers to Francis di Paolino of Offida), but most likely the sole artist of the work is the former.

The statue is 152 cm in height and made with embossed silver. The statue shows the patron saint of Ascoli in his pontifical garb giving a blessing with his right hand, while in his left hand he holds his crosier. Added in the 17th century, well after the statue's creation, the crosier was donated by Cardinal Bernerio as indicated by the coat of arms depicted at the end of the handle.

The folds in the cloth of his garments are particularly well-done; on the front of the mitre are incised six oval forms showing images of the four saints of Ascoli. The edges of the stole and cope are richly woven in relief, and the work of the hood is decorated with floral motifs. The round clip of the cope, centred inside a starred perimeter, has an engraving indicating the moment in which Pope Marcello I consecrated the saint as a bishop. This statue, along with the arm-reliquary and the beheading stone (preserved in the little shrine of Sant'Emidio Rosso), are among the icons most venerated by the faithful of the city of Ascoli.

=== Saint Emygdius arm-reliquary by Pietro Vannini ===
The arm-reliquary of Saint Emygdius is made of gold-plated silver, stands 87 cm high, in the shape of an arm ending in the hand of blessing, contains a relic of Saint Emygdius. The arm rises up from a base in the shape of a hexagonal star made of superimposed disks. The reliquary, attributed by Emile Bertaux to goldsmith Pietro Vannini, was made in the 15th century and commissioned by the priest Giovanni di Filippo, as written in its inscription: «HOC OPUS FECIT FIERI DOMINUS IHOANNES PHILIPPI SAC.»

The hand, which shows a precious episcopal ring on its ring finger, appears wrapped up among the pleats of a glove in a portion of the hem of which is inscribed in gothic characters: «IESUS AUTEM TRANSIENS P.R.». The part of the forearm is covered by the silver sleeve of a shirt brocaded in leaf and flora designs affixed with a silver ribbon. On the inside of the ribbon can be read: «AVE MARIA». The trim is held together by a golden clip in which are embedded four rubies and four emeralds. At the centre can be seen a stylized representation of the city of Ascoli with a bridge and many towers that rise above and in front of a Roman she-wolf.

=== The 16th-century Florentine crosier ===
This crosier, 180 cm in height, is made of embossed silver by the masters of Florentine gold-work of the 16th century. It was donated to the Capitolo di Ascoli by Girolamo Bernerio, a cardinal who belonged to the Dominican order. The renaissance design is usually attributed to Giorgio Vasari. It is made of a long handle ending in a precious spiral that is composed of acanthus leaves that encompass at the center a small Christ Child giving a blessing. The figure of the Baby Jesus is set up at the base of a little iconic temple with columns and pediments. Under the pediments are four small niches that hold images of the Madonna of Loreto, Saint Emygdius, Saint Francis, and Saint Dominic. In the portion over the pediments, inside the tympanum, are the coats of arms of Cardinal Bernerio and of the city of Ascoli.

== See also ==
- Ascoli Piceno
- Piazza Arringo

== Bibliography ==
- Antonio Rodilossi, Ascoli Piceno città d'arte, "Stampa & Stampa" Gruppo Euroarte Gattei, Grafiche STIG, Modena, 1983, pp. 77 – 78;
