= Allegretti =

Allegretti is an Italian surname. Notable people with this surname include:

- Antonio Allegretti (1840–1918), Italian sculptor
- Carlo Allegretti (16th–17th century), Italian painter
- Joel Allegretti, American poet and fiction writer
- Mario Allegretti (1919–1945
- Riccardo Allegretti (born 1978), Italian soccer player
