= Piazza Arringo =

Coordinates: 42.8534°N 13.5776°E

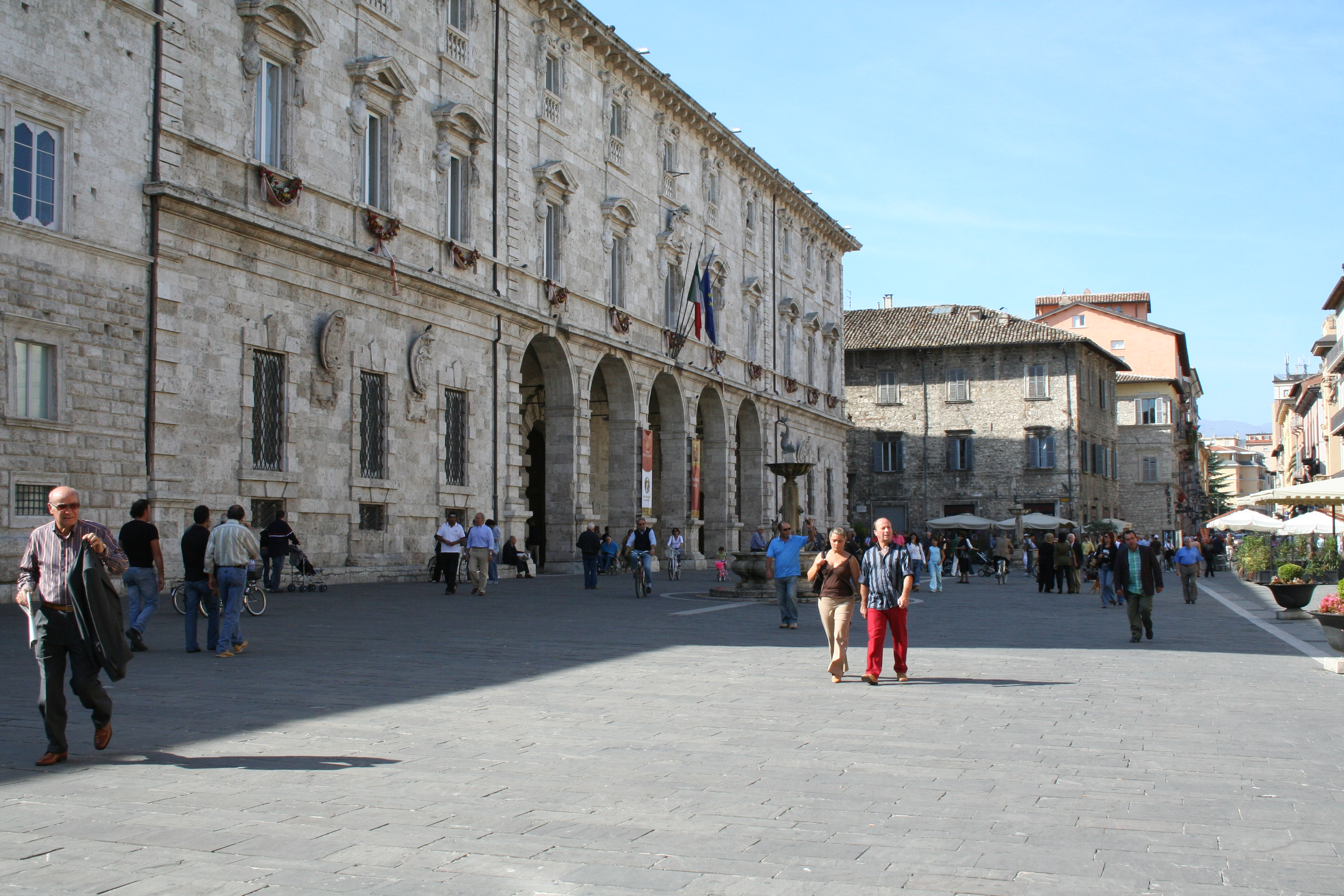
Piazza Arringo

The Piazza Arringo, also known as the piazza dell'Arengo, is the oldest monumental piazza in the city of Ascoli Piceno.

Rectangular in form, numerous important monuments face the piazza including: the palazzo Fonzi, the palazzo dell'Arengo from the 13th century (also known as the palatium Aringhi), the Bishop's residence, the Cathedral of Saint Emygdius, the baptistery of Saint John, the diocesan museum, and the palazzo Panichi.

== History ==
The piazza's name comes from the Middle Ages when Ascoli became a free comune and used this site for public meetings of the parliament, also known as arringhi, arenghi or arringhe: an assembly of citizens gathered to deliberate. This became the most important center of public events and social life of the city, and several authors name it as the place of the ancient Roman forum of Ascoli.

Giuseppe Marinelli says that in 1152 a platform was erected in the piazza that would be used by public speakers. It was here that St. Francis of Assisi, in 1215, and later St. James of the Marches (in 1446 and 1471) spoke to the citizens of Ascoli.

In 1355, after the expulsion of Galeotto I Malatesta and Vanni di Vendibene, the Statues of the People were drawn up to replace the Statues of the Comune.

In the middle ages at the center of the piazza was a gigantic elm tree. The administrators of the town would come together underneath the tree to discuss town business. From Francesco Bartonini d'Arquata's chronicles of Ascoli, we learn that on February 7, 1369 the great elm was blown down in a great storm that hit the city. Bartolini wrote: «cecidit ulmus maxima et antiquissima, quae stabat in arengho». The tree was replaced by a new one which had to be replaced in 1373. Documents of the era speak of this last tree up until the end of the 15th century. The tree remained there for about a century, but when this one died it was not replaced.

The piazza has been used for military parades, games, and tournaments related to religious festivals linked to the city's patron saint, Saint Emygdius. Among these it is worth mentioning that of 1462, made famous by the victory of the noble woman, Menichina Soderini, who beat Ludovico Malvezzi of Bologna in a horse riding competition.

In 1882 Nicola Cantalamessa made a sculpture of King Victor Emmanuel II which was placed in the piazza. After the second world war the statue of the king was removed and can now be seen in the public gardens.

Today in the piazza two elliptical fountains made of travertine can be found. They were made by Giovanni Jecini and embellished with bronze sculptures by Giorgio Paci.

== Image gallery ==
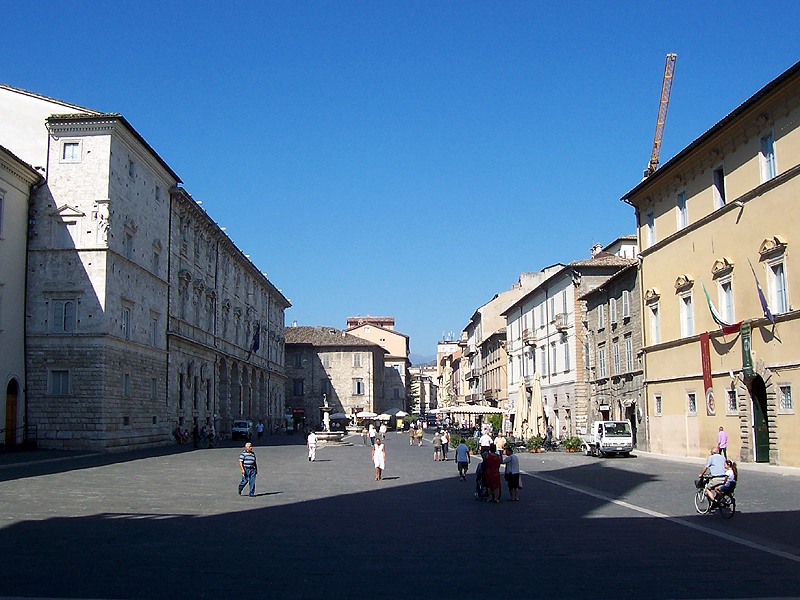
The piazza

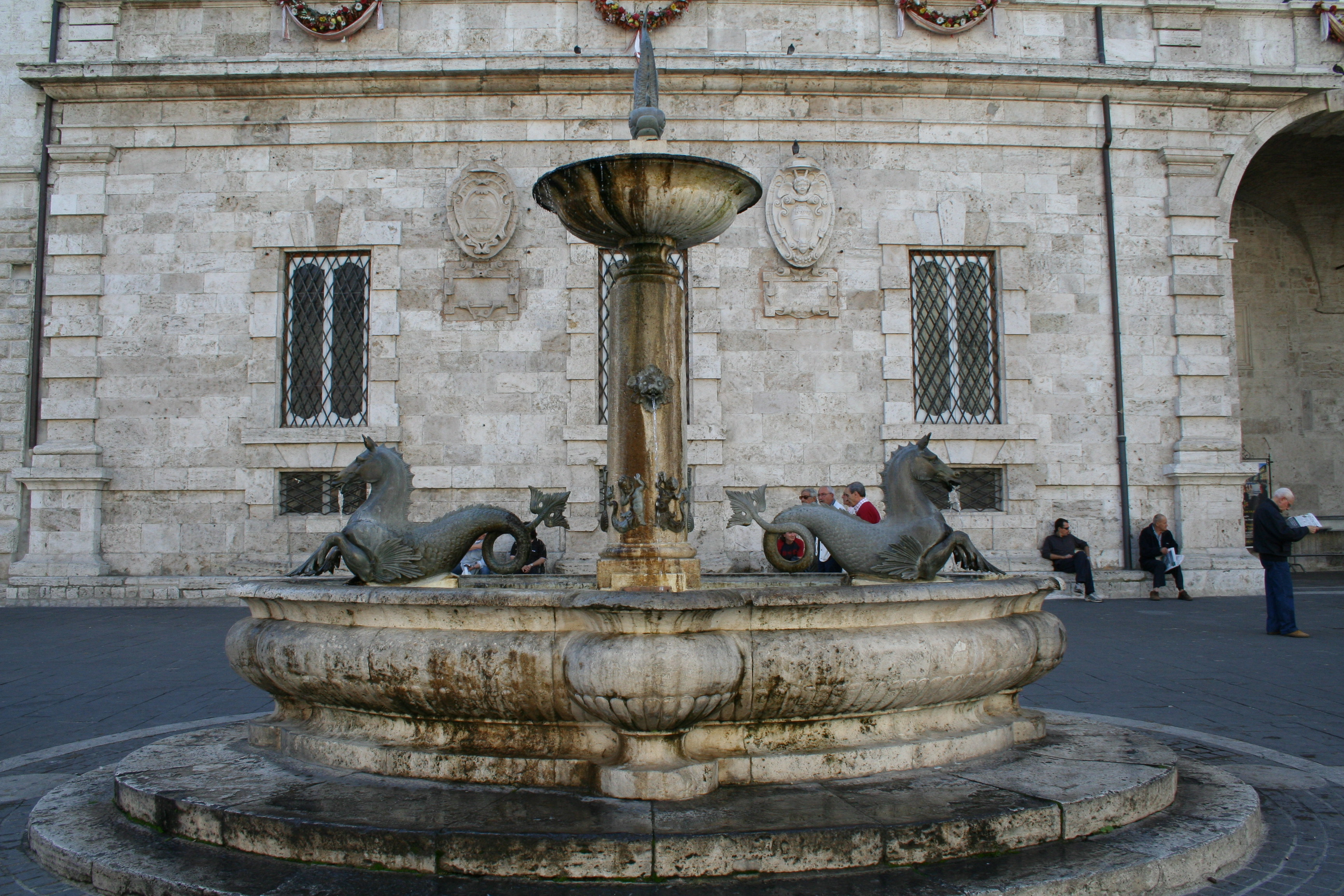
One of the two fountains in the piazza

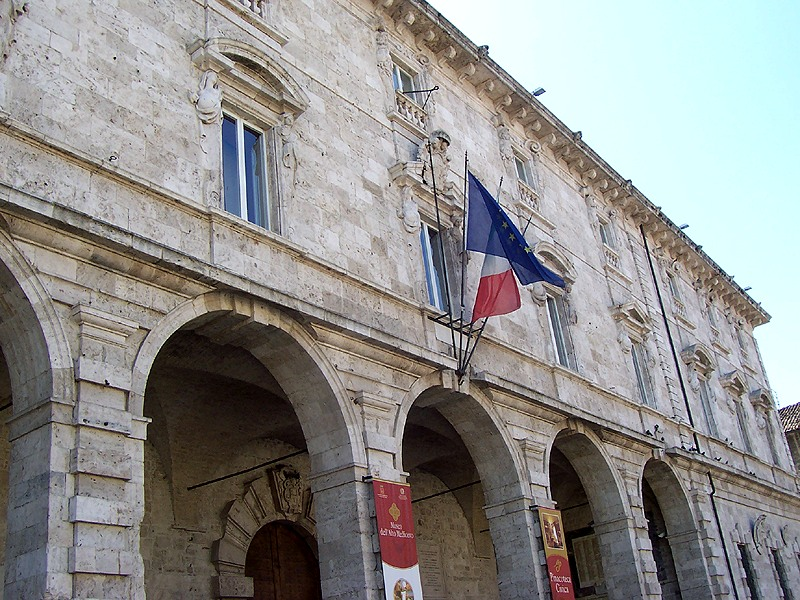
The town hall

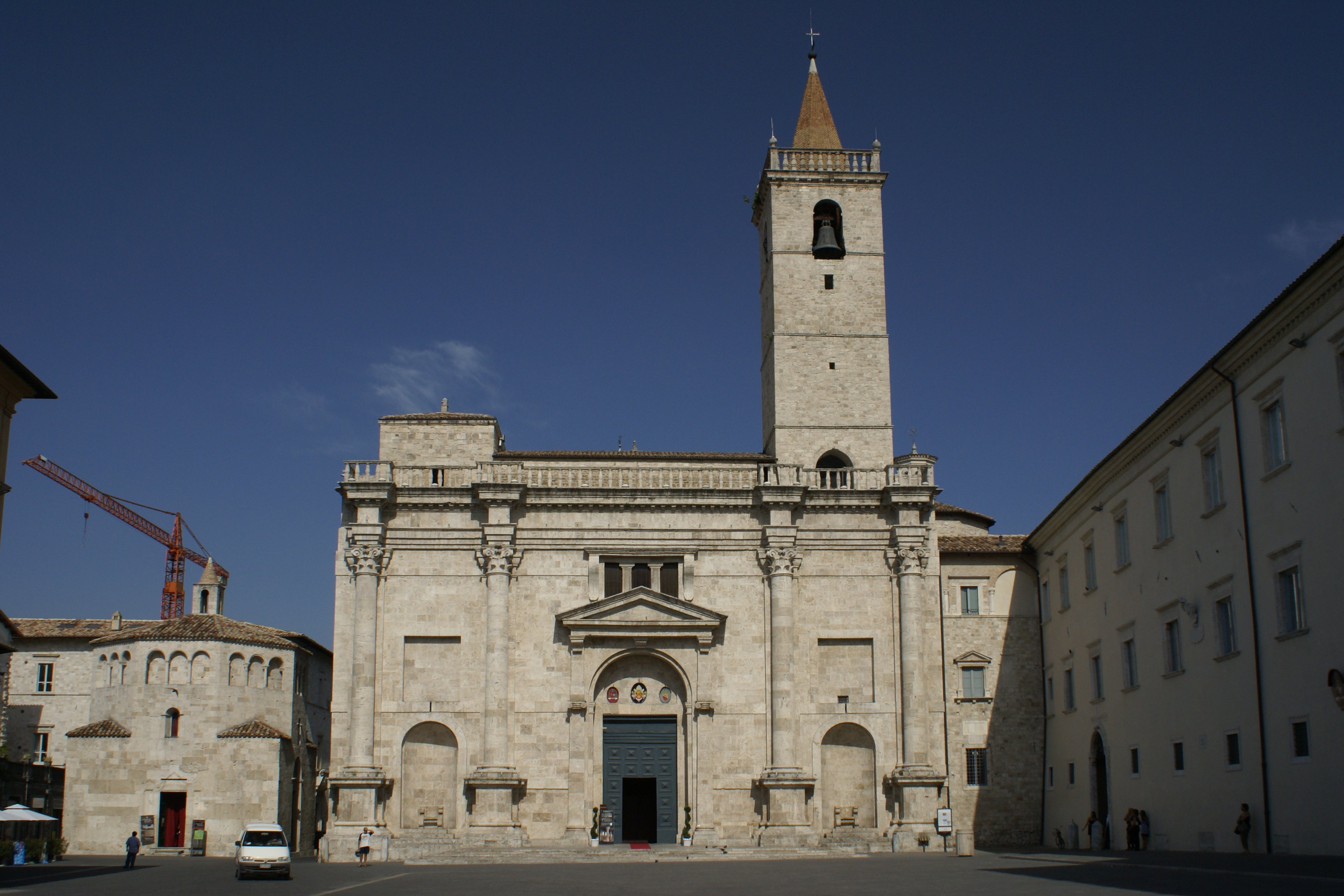
Ascoli cathedral, named for Saint Emygdius

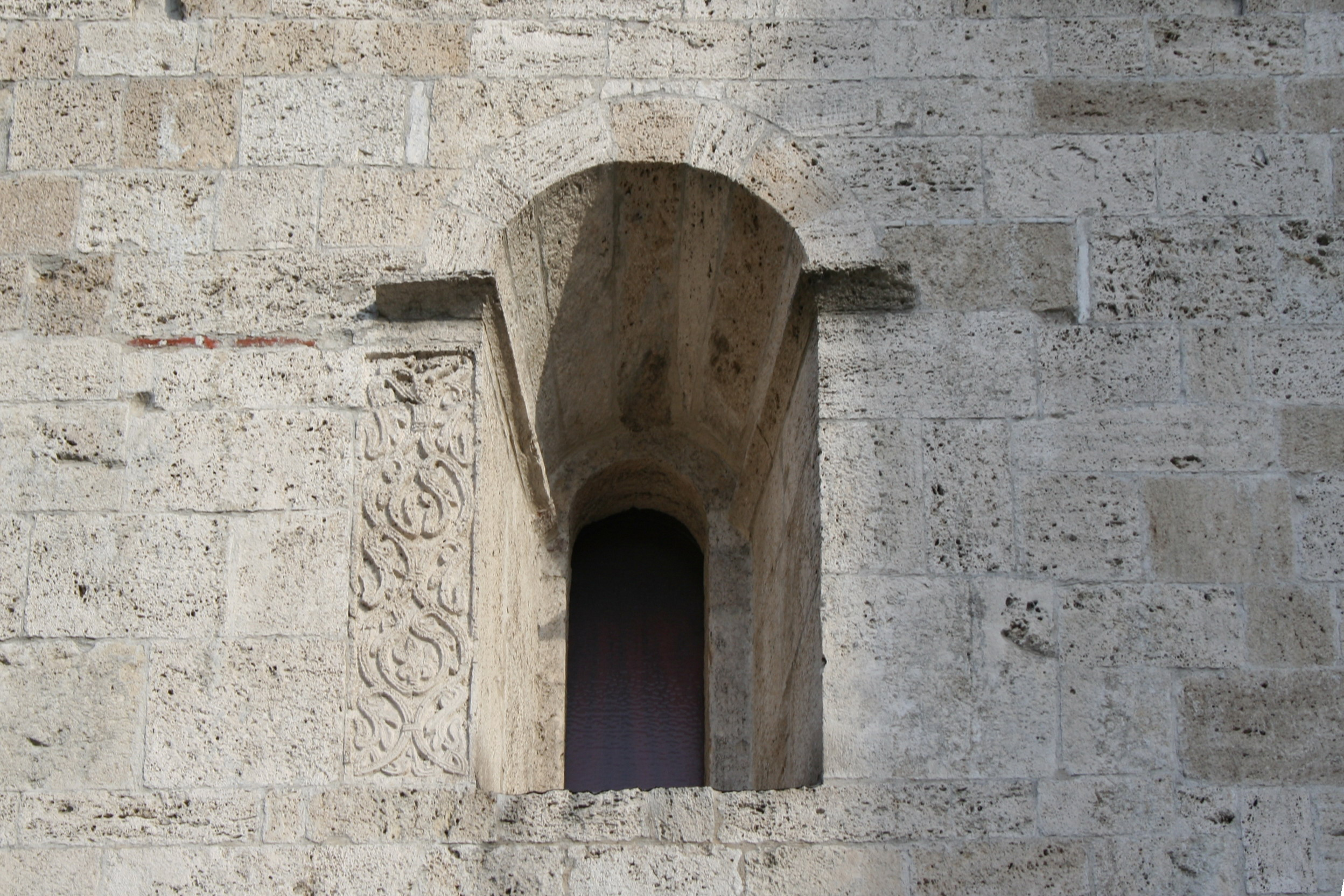
One of the windows of the Baptistery of St. John

== Bibliography ==
- Sebastiano Andreantonelli, Historiae Asculanae Liber V, Padova, Typis Matthaei de Cadorinis, 1673, pp. 206.
- Antonio Rodilossi, Ascoli Piceno città d'arte, "Stampa & Stampa" Gruppo Euroarte Gattei, Grafiche STIG, Modena, 1983, pp. 55.
- Giannino Gagliardi, Le piazze di Ascoli, Cassa di Risparmio di Ascoli Piceno, Cinisello Balsamo, Amilcare Pizzi, 1996.
- Giuseppe Marinelli, Dizionario Toponomastico Ascolano - La Storia, i Costumi, i Personaggi nelle Vie della Città, D'Auria Editrice, Ascoli Piceno, marzo 2009, pp. 40 – 41, 318.

== Related links ==
- Ascoli Piceno
- Saint Emygdius
- Ascoli Piceno Cathedral
- Diocesan museum of Ascoli Piceno, Italy

== Other links ==
- Virtual tour cronologico di Piazza Arringo a 360° URL consultato il 7 gennaio 2012
- Video stereoscopico cronologico Piazza Arringo URL consultato il 7 gennaio 2012
- La storia per immagini. Piazza Arringo di Ascoli Piceno URL consultato il 13 febbraio 2012
