= Nebotičnik =

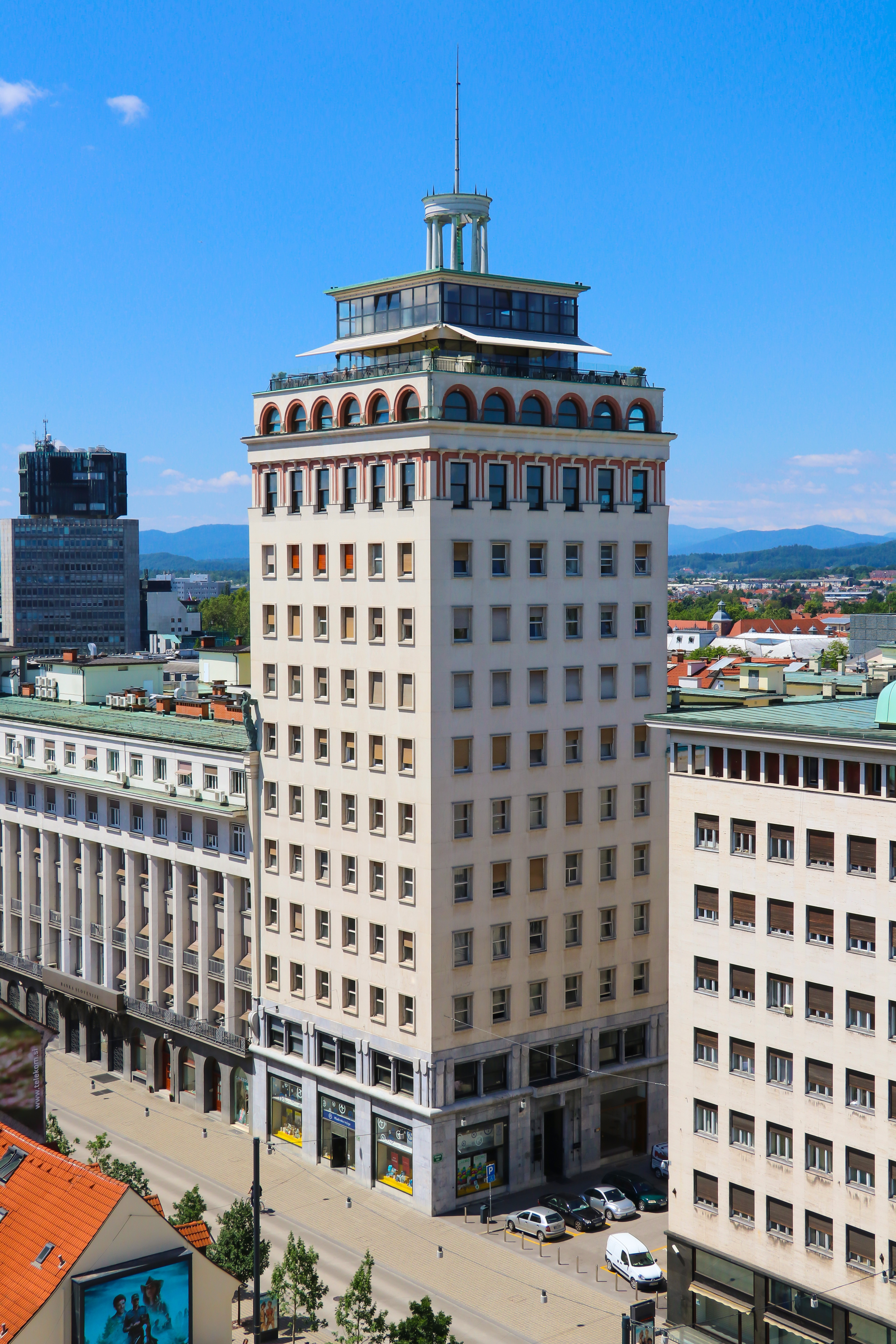
- The Nebotičnik building from Slovene Street (Slovenska cesta)
- Interactive map of the Nebotičnik area

General information
- Type: Multi-use
- Location: 1 Štefan Street (Štefanova ulica); Ljubljana, Slovenia
- Coordinates: 46°03′12″N 14°30′13″E
- Construction started: 1931
- Completed: 1933
- Opening: 21 February 1933

Height
- Roof: 70.35 m (231 ft)

Technical details
- Floor count: 13
- Lifts/elevators: 3

Design and construction
- Architects: Vladimir Šubic, Ladislav Kham, Ivo Medved, Marjan Mušič, Marjan Sever, Bojan Stupica
- Structural engineer: Stanko Dimnik
- Main contractor: Ljubljana Construction Company

Nebotičnik (Slovene: [nɛbɔtiːtʃniːk]; English: the Skyscraper) is a prominent high-rise located in the centre of Ljubljana, Slovenia, and is one of the city's most recognisable landmarks. Its thirteen storeys rise to a height of 70.35 m (231 ft). It was designed by the Slovenian architect Vladimir Šubic for the Pension Institute, the building's investor. Construction began on 19 April 1931 and the building opened on 21 February 1933. It was, upon completion, the tallest building in the Kingdom of Yugoslavia, and the ninth-tallest high-rise in Europe. It was and would remain for some time the tallest residential building in Europe.

Predominantly a place of business, the Nebotičnik skyscraper is home to a variety of shops on the ground floor and first storey, and various offices are located on floors two to five. The sixth to ninth floors are private residences. Located on the top three floors are a café, bar and observation deck. The café reopened in July 2010, while the bar and a new restaurant opened on 2 September 2010. Floors nine to thirteen were sold in auction on 12 June 2007 by the Pension Fund Management (KAD) for €2,120,000 to the Australian company Terra Australis. The company hoped to restore the Nebotičnik skyscraper to its former glory.

== Architecture ==
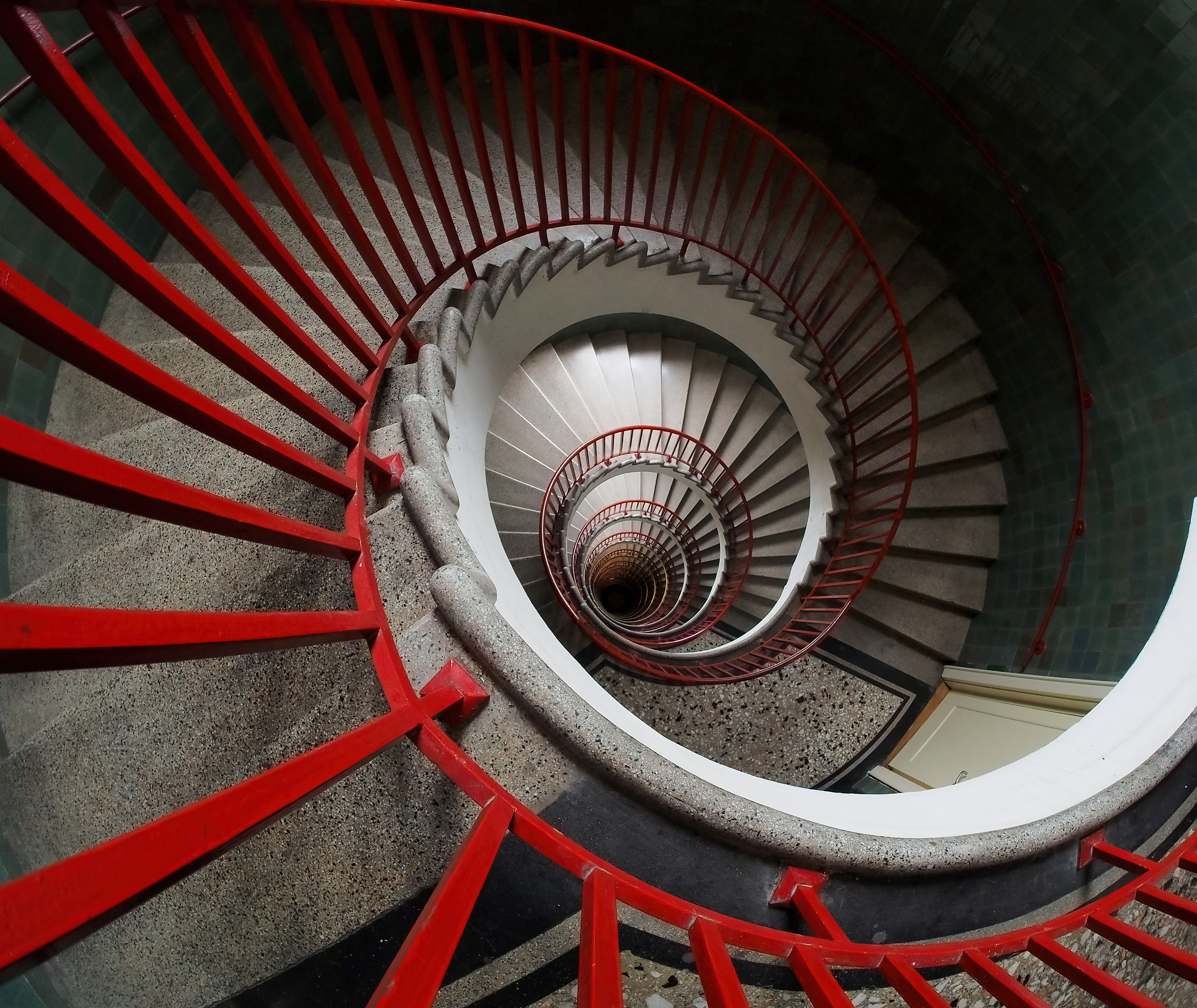
Art déco spiral stairs

The Nebotičnik building, originally designed as an eight-storey structure, was designed by Vladimir Šubic, with assistance from Ladislav Kham, Ivo Medved (pavilion on the terrace), Marjan Mušič (tempietto on top), Marjan Sever, and Bojan Stupica (fittings of the cafe). The building was decorated with sculptures by Lojze Dolinar (the female figure on the side façade in the height of the sixth floor), Boris Kalin (the relief above the main entrance), and France Gorše (four bronze heads in the main hall). Its design is based on the neoclassical and art-deco styles, and is crowned with pilasters on the upper floors. Its design follows the classical tripartite division of tall buildings pioneered by the American architect Louis Sullivan—it is composed of a base designed to interact with the street and pedestrians, a homogeneous shaft, and a crown, topped by a cylindrical colonnade with a mounted flag pole, which was added after the completion of the tower. The façade is interrupted by evenly distributed rectangular windows framed in stone, an accentuated ground level and first floor, and semi-circular windows in the café on the eleventh storey.

The entrance on the ground floor leads to a lobby lined with Karst marble. Upper storeys are accessible by elevator or the spiral stairway at the centre of the building. Two of the elevators are fast and lead visitors to the café on the upper floors, while the third is slower and leads to the residential levels. The stairway terminates at the tenth floor.

The façade is adorned by a four-metre (13 foot) tall sculpture of a woman, the work of the Slovenian sculptor Lojze Dolinar, to help alleviate the connection between the tower and the lower bank next to the tower. Sculptures in the loggia were designed by the Slovenian sculptor France Gorše. Located to the west of the Nebotičnik building is a six-storey residential structure, designed by the same architect.

== Construction ==
Construction of the Nebotičnik building, ordered by the Pension Institute, was controversial. Being the first building to surpass the Baroque silhouette of city's bell towers, some residents of Ljubljana feared it would spoil the skyline, and labelled the building a "freak". The building is located on the site of a medieval monastery, and while preparing its foundation, contractors came across a 13th-century well. A verse by Oton Župančič was inscribed in the foundation stone at the beginning of its construction in 1931.

The geological survey for the construction of the building and geological supervision were carried out by Karel Hinterlechner. The statics were calculated by the engineer Stanko Dimnik, who was also the responsible engineer. The strictest set of Japanese anti-seismic criteria was followed in the design of the building, therefore it is supported by 16 pilings each extending 18 m (59 ft) into the ground. This makes the Nebotičnik building one of the most earthquake-proof in Ljubljana.

The building was constructed with reinforced concrete, and features many technological elements which were innovative at the time. It has central heating by automatic fuel oil burners, and water is supplied to the top seven floors by automatic pumps. The café has pressure ventilation, and hot water is supplied from the basement. The works were led by the master builder Ivan Bricelj, the director of the Ljubljana Construction Company.

== See also ==
- List of tallest buildings in Slovenia
