= Tempietto =

Tempietto (Italian: "small temple") generally means a small temple-like or pavilion-like structure and is a name of many places in Italy:

- Tempietto del Bramante in Rome, a tomb by Donato Bramante
- Villa Barbaro#Church (Tempietto Barbaro) at Maser, a church planned by Palladio
- Tempietto of Sant'Antonio, Rimini, a baroque church in Rimini
- Temple of Aesculapius (Villa Borghese) (called also Tempietto of Aesculapius) in Rome, built by Antonio Asprucci and his son Mario Asprucci
- Temple of Clitumnus or Tempietto del Clitunno, an early medieval church in Pissignano
- Tempietto del Petrarca, Canossa, a commemorative structure in Selvapiana
- Sant'Emidio alle Grotte or Tempietto, a Baroque church in Ascoli Piceno
- Sant'Emidio Rosso or Tempietto Sant'Emidio Rosso, a church of Ascoli Piceno
- Sanctuary of Santa Maria infra Saxa, Genga and Tempietto Valadier by Giuseppe Valadier
- Oratorio di Santa Maria in Valle, previously called the Tempietto longobardo, Valle
- Pitigliano § Tempietto, a cave in Pitigliano
- Tempietto di Santa Croce (Bergamo), small Romanesque chapel, Bergamo
- Tempietto di San Fedelino sul Lago Mezzola, 10th to 11th-century small church in Via San Fedelino
- Rucellai Sepulchre or Tempietto del Santo Sepolcro or Tempietto Rucellai, a funerary chapel inside of the church of San Pancrazio, Florence
