= Sant'Emidio alle Grotte =

Roman Catholic church in Ascoli Piceno, Italy

Coordinates: 42°51′41″N 13°34′38″E

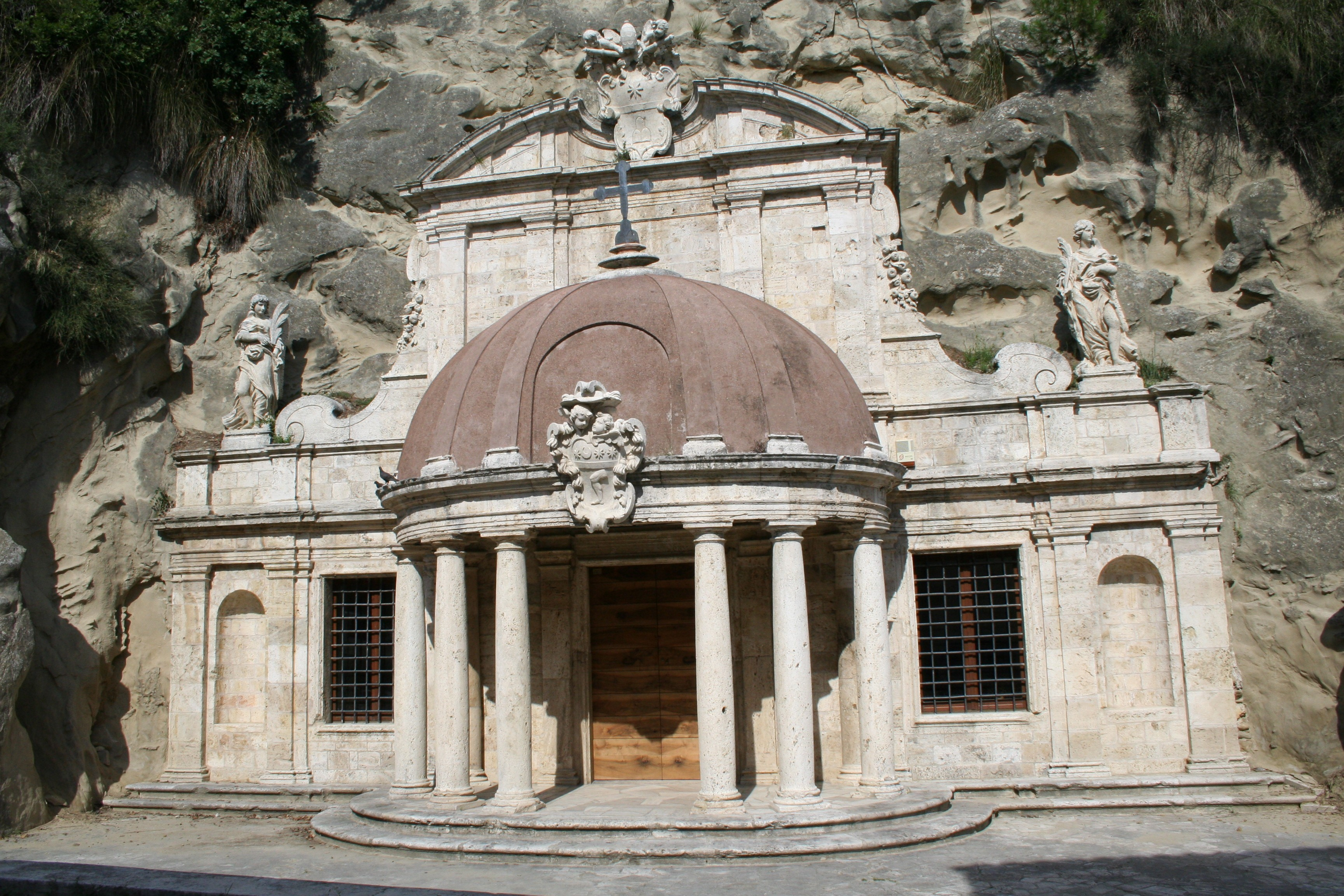
The facade of Sant'Emidio alle Grotte.

Sant'Emidio alle Grotte is a Baroque church in Ascoli Piceno, Italy.

Its name refers to Saint Emygdius (Emidius). According to legend, after having been beheaded in 309 near the current church of Sant'Emidio Rosso, the saint walked here with his head in his hands to be buried. The church (known as tempietto, meaning "small temple", for its small size) was built in 1717–1720/21 by commission of bishop Giovanni Gambi, a relative of Pope Clement XI. It consists of a travertine façade which precedes three grottoes housing the saint's sepulture, which have been turned into oratories.
