= Ascoli Piceno Baptistery =

Roman Catholic church in Ascoli Piceno, Italy

Coordinates: 42.8537661°N 13.5762911°E

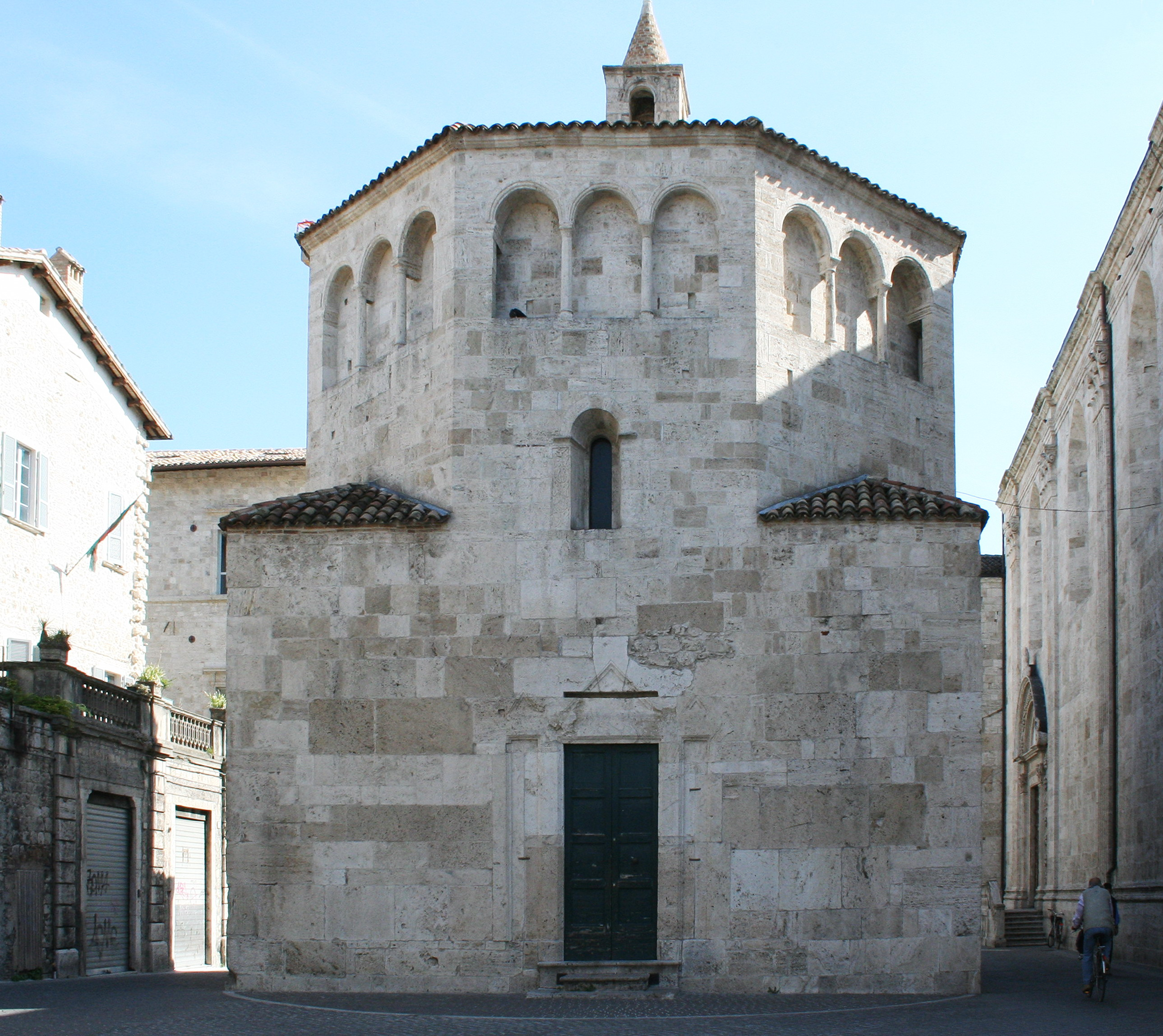
Ascoli Piceno Baptistery

The Ascoli Piceno Baptistery (Italian: Il battistero di San Giovanni di Ascoli Piceno), also known as the baptistery of Saint John, is a religious building found on the eastern end of the piazza Arringo at the center of Ascoli Piceno and sitting next to and just north of the cathedral dedicated to St. Emygdius, the city's patron saint.

The structure, simple and austere in its architectural form, perfectly represents the Romanesque style in Ascoli, and, being ranked among the best examples of Italian works of art, is included in the list of Italian national monuments (r.d. n.7033 del 20/07/1890).

== History ==
The beginning of the baptistery's construction is difficult to date accurately, but archeological finds from 1828 and other excavations between 1870 and 1880 suggest that the interior of the structure was a pagan temple on Ascoli's forum which may have been dedicated to Hercules.

According to Giambattista Carducci, the temple was used as a baptistery already by the 6th century. He also notes that its octagonal form is like the baptistery of Saint John in Florence, of the Arian baptistery of Ravenna, and of the Lateran baptistery in Rome built by Constantine.

The baptistery's first restoration came prior to the 9th century, with interventions following in the 10th and 11th centuries as shown in the triangular decorations and the framing of the principal entrance. Most recently, the interior of the baptistery was restored in 2006.

== Architecture ==
The baptistery is constructed of large, square blocks of travertine, some of which were taken from earlier structures. Visible at the base of the eastern side are the remains of a Roman wall. It is a freestanding structure with a massive, square base containing entrances on two sides. The tiburio (the upper part of the structure designed to shape and protect the cupola within) is octagonal in shape, decorated with four small windows, and crowned with a square lantern, also containing windows to allow light inside. Each side of the tiburio is decorated with a blind arcade containing three round arches, with exception of the east facing side which contains a pair of arcades with only two arches each. All of these arcades were added during the 12th century.

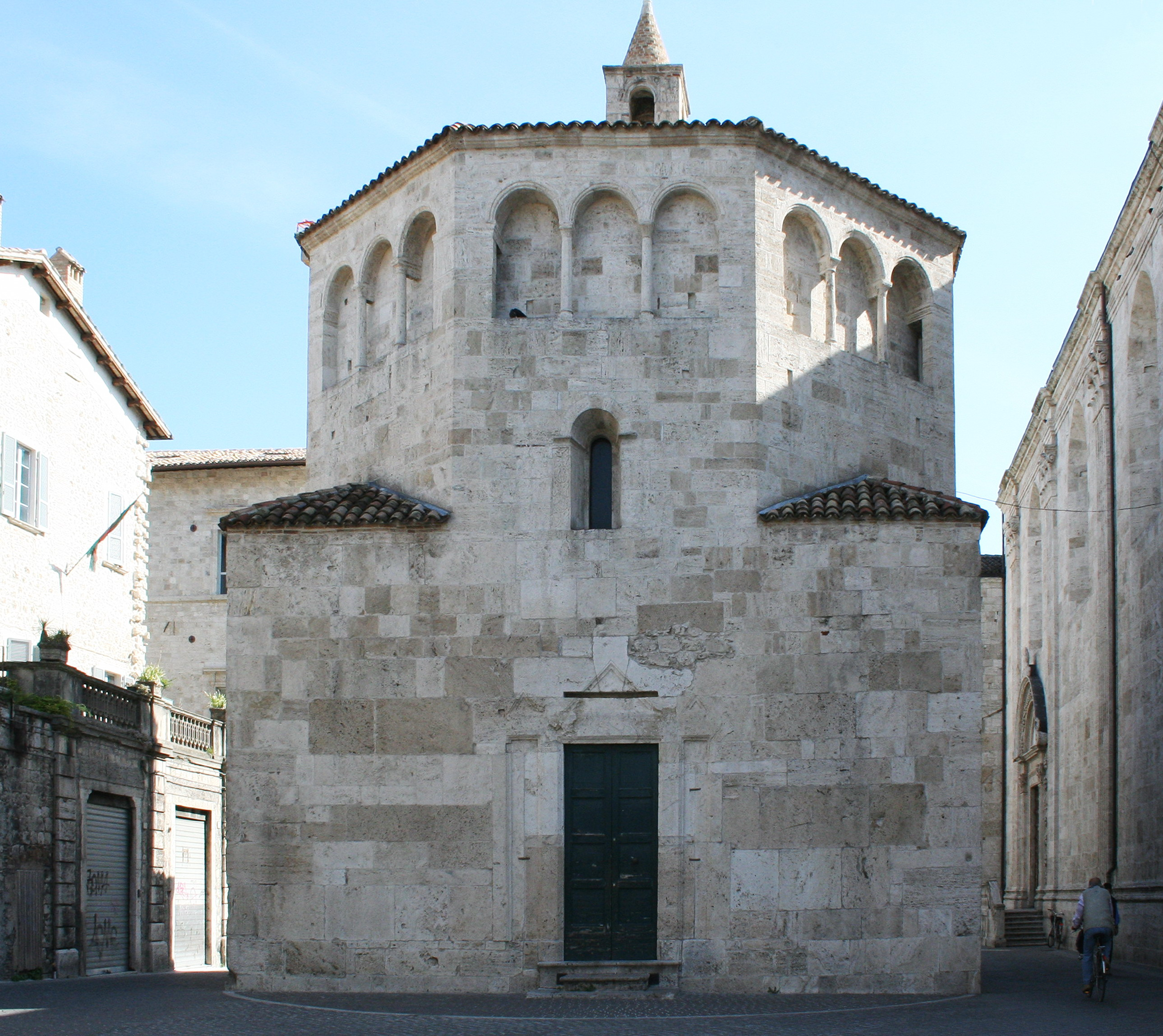
Main entrance of the Baptistery

The original monument had three entrances symbolizing the Holy Trinity as well as the Three Churches: the church militant, composed of all the baptized faithful to Christ and the Pope; the church penitent, which includes all the souls in purgatory that are being prepared for heaven; and the church triumphant, comprising the saints and angels. Today the baptistery has two entrances. The main entrance, found on piazza Arringo, is flanked by two recessed rectangular forms, and the architrave above is decorated with three recessed triangles, one large triangle in the center which is marked by a wide horizontal slit, and two small ones on the sides. The other entrance faces the cathedral door known as the La porta della Musa, and contains stone work from various periods, including Romanesque capitals and an bas-relief architrave that contains a knotted cord (a type of decoration that was very diffuse around the year 1000).

The interior of the baptistery has an irregular, octagonal shape, typically Roman, with niches that correspond to the angles of the square base. The octagonal walls measure about 5,5 meters each; the dimensions of the interiore are 9,14 x 9 meters. Inside at the center of the floor, directly below the oculus of the cupola, is a slightly raised circular pool, dated to the 5th or 6th century but rediscovered only in 1839, that was used by Christians for baptism by immersion. This unique spot was used for the baptism of both men and women who were assisted, respectively, by deacons and deaconesses. On the right side is a baptismal font from the 14th or 15th century, set on top of a twisted column. On the altar is a painting of the Baptism of Christ, a 16th-century oil on canvas, attributed to Venceslao Corrigioli di Reggio.

== Symbolism ==
The historian Mario Sabatucci has attributed a symbolic reading to the form of Ascoli's baptistery according to Christian doctrine. According to his interpretation, the square base represents the earth and its four elements (air, earth, fire, and water), the four points of the compass, the four seasons, and the four periods of a human life-span. The octagonal tiburio calls to mind baptism as described by St. Peter in his first letter: (3,20-21) « while God patiently waited to receive them, in Noah's time when the ark was being built. In it only a few, that is eight souls, were saved through water. It is the baptism corresponding to this water which saves you now ... » The round cupola, like a circle or a sphere, represents eternity and paradise.

== Images ==
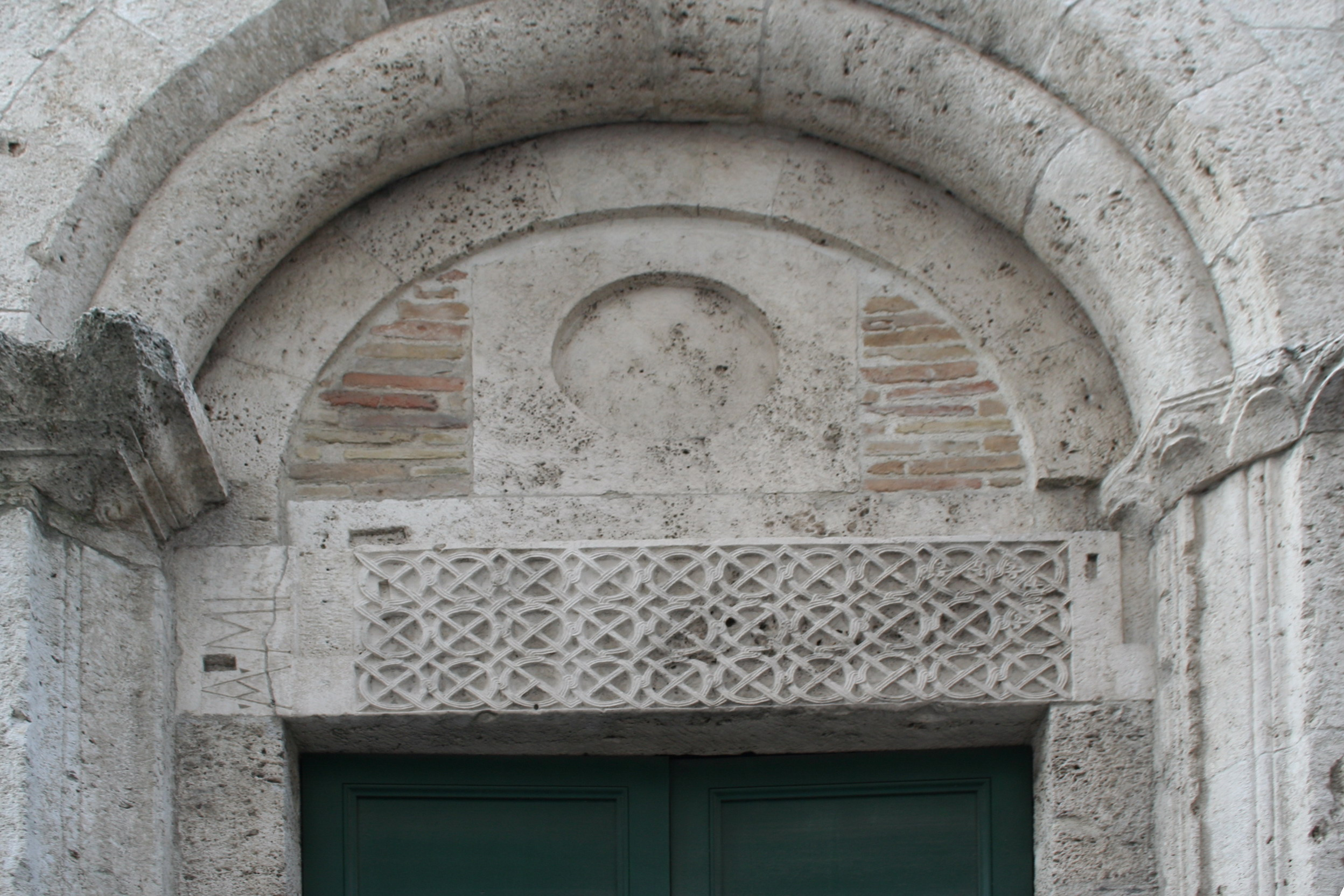
Architrave with bas-rilief and traces of knotted cord

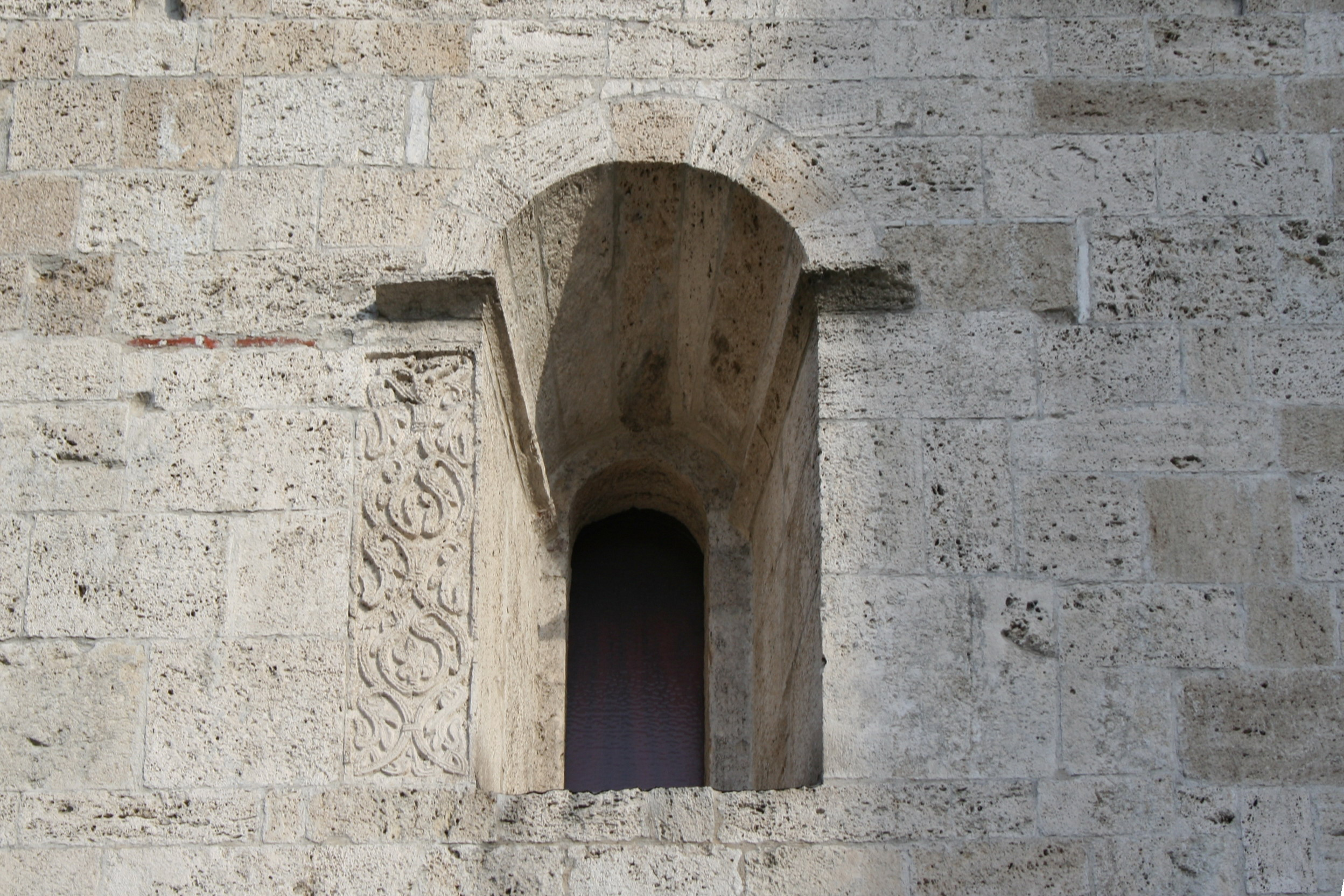
Single window above the entrance facing the piazza Arringo

== See also ==
- Baptistery
- Ascoli Piceno Cathedral
- Piazza Arringo
- Porta della Musa
- Ascoli Piceno

== Bibliography ==
- Giambattista Carducci, Su le memorie e i monumenti di Ascoli nel Piceno, Fermo, S. Del Monte, 1853, pp. 88–91;
- Antonio Rodilossi, Ascoli Piceno città d'arte, "Stampa & Stampa" Gruppo Euroarte Gattei, Grafiche STIG, Modena, 1983, p. 73;
