= Vladimir Šubic =

Slovene architect

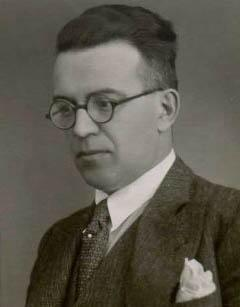
- Born: May 23, 1894; Ljubljana, Duchy of Carniola, Austria-Hungary
- Died: September 16, 1946 (aged 52); Lukavac, PR Bosnia and Herzegovina, FPR Yugoslavia
- Occupation: Architect

Vladimir Šubic (23 May 1894 – 16 September 1946) was a Slovene architect. He designed several moderate functionalist buildings in Ljubljana, most notably the Nebotičnik skyscraper, which was the tallest building in Yugoslavia upon its completion. His architectural design was rational and economic, following metropolitan patterns and American high-rise examples.

== Life ==
Šubic was born in Ljubljana, then the capital of the Duchy of Carniola, part of Austria-Hungary, and baptized Vladimir Ivan Viljem Šubic. He began his studies at the Technical University of Vienna in 1912, studying mechanical engineering. He studied shipbuilding at the University of Graz a year later, and in 1919 enrolled in the department of architecture at the Czech Technical University in Prague. He passed his final examinations in 1922 and began his career as an architect and engineer.

He returned to Ljubljana, then part of the Kingdom of Serbs, Croats and Slovenes and soon became a successful architect. His interest in contemporary architectural developments led him to design the first Slovene skyscraper, based on the most recent architectural developments.

After World War II his career became endangered because of his liberal worldview, regarded as hostile by the new communist authorities. He was first imprisoned on secret charges and sentenced to forced labor, and then released and denied work. In 1946, he was sent by the Titoist regime of the Federal People's Republic of Yugoslavia to the work brigade in Bosnia, to work as an engineer on the construction of the Brčko-Banovići railway line. He died in Lukavac building the line the same year under unknown circumstances, although the cause of death was officially reported as "infarction". He is buried in the Škofja Loka cemetery.

== Buildings ==
Vladimir Šubic was the architect of many buildings. Below is a list of his more notable accomplishments:

- The Nebotičnik high-rise
- The Koehler Mansion
- The Meksika apartment house
- The Chamber of Labour (Delavska zbornica), now the seat of the Slovenian Cinematheque
- Several apartment blocks for the Pension Fund Institution (Pokojninski zavod)
- The tomb for the Jelačin family
- The Šubic Mansion
- The Palace of Trade
- The Grafika Palace
- The Palace of Trade Academy
- The Udarnik Cinema in Maribor
- "Putnikov paviljon" in Celje
