= Ascoli Piceno Cathedral =

Roman Catholic church in Ascoli Piceno, Italy

Coordinates: 42.8535°N 13.5786°E

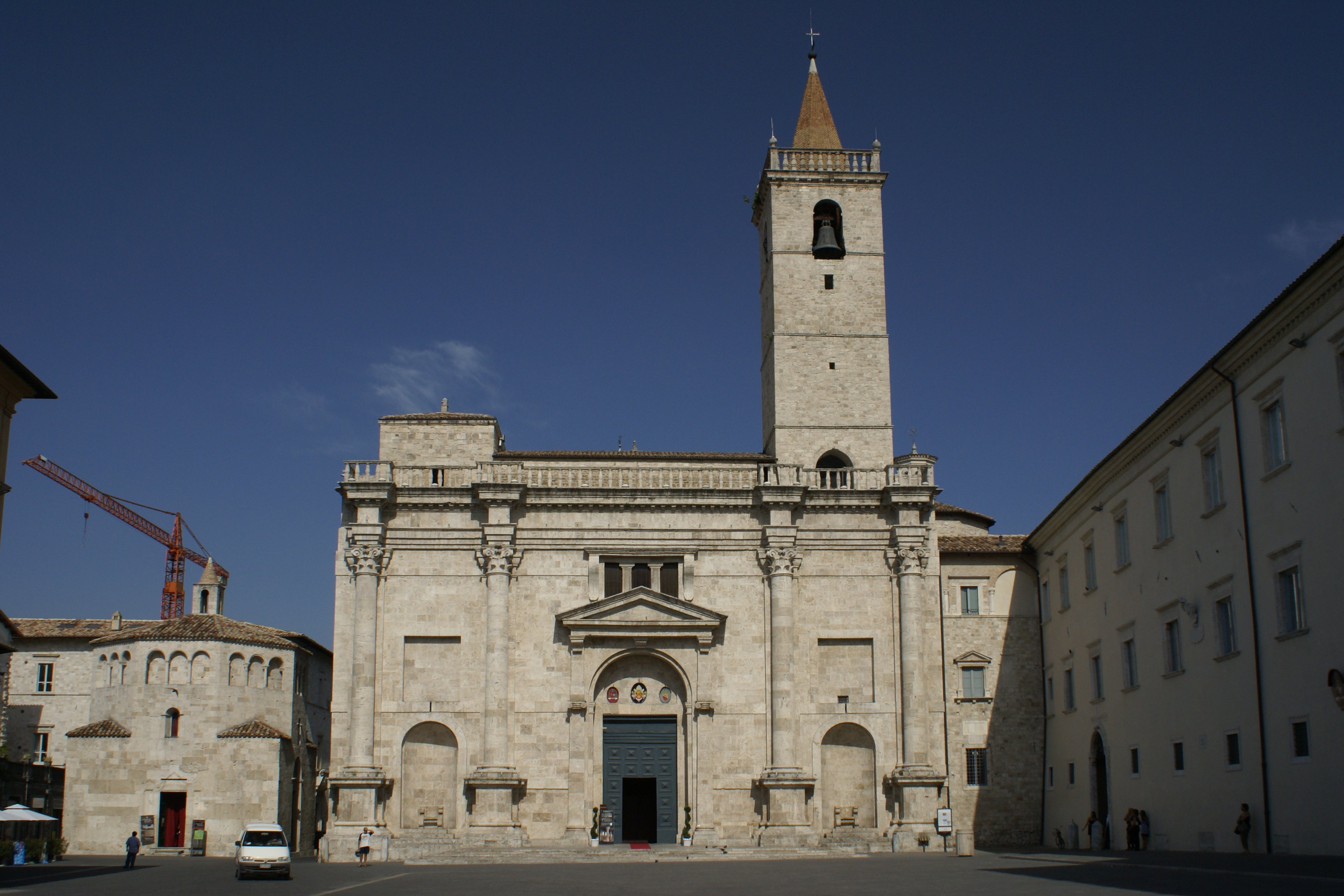
Ascoli Piceno Cathedral with its baptistery to the left

Ascoli Piceno Cathedral (Italian: Duomo di Ascoli Piceno; Cattedrale di Sant'Emidio) is a Roman Catholic cathedral dedicated to Saint Emygdius in Ascoli Piceno, Marche, Italy. It is the episcopal seat of the Diocese of Ascoli Piceno.

== See also ==
- Catholic Church in Italy
