= Mario Allegretti =

Italian partisan

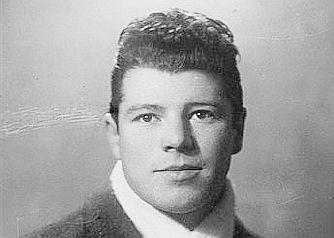
- Born: 6 September 1919; Vignola, Kingdom of Italy
- Died: 10 April 1945 (aged 25); Prignano sulla Secchia, Italian Social Republic
- Military career
- Allegiance: Kingdom of Italy
- Branch: Royal Italian Army
- Service years: 1941–1943
- Rank: Second Lieutenant
- Commands: 34th Partisan Brigade "Monte Santa Giulia"
- Conflicts: World War II
- Awards: Gold Medal of Military Valour (posthumous)

Mario Allegretti (Vignola, 6 September 1919 – Saltino, 10 April 1945) was an Italian soldier and Resistance leader during World War II.

== Biography ==
He was born in Vignola, province of Modena, on 6 September 1919, the son of Antonio Allegretti and Rosa Vedovelli, and after graduating in law from the University of Modena, in December 1941, he was called up for service in the Royal Italian Army during the Royal Italian Army and assigned to the 33rd Tank Regiment, stationed in Parma, with the rank of second lieutenant, after attending an officer's course in Bologna. After the fall of Fascism, during the short rule of the Badoglio government, he joined the Action Party together with his brother Franco.

Following the proclamation of the armistice of Cassibile and the German occupation of Italy, he avoided capture by the Germans in Parma and started to organize the first Justice and Freedom partisan groups on Monte Santa Giulia, in the Modenese Apennines. He was arrested in June 1944 but released by the intervention of the CLN, reaching the partisan groups operating in the area of Montefiorino, Ospitaletto, Pianorso and Are Vecchie. Due to his courage he quickly rose in rank and was given command of the "Italia Libera" partisan group and from November 1944 that of the 34th Partisan Brigade "Monte Santa Giulia", part of the "Modena Montagna" Partisan Division. On 10 April 1945 he was killed in action while leading an attack on a German machine-gun post – after having already silenced another two – during the defense of Monte Santa Giulia. He was posthumously awarded the Gold Medal of Military Valor.
