= Lojze Dolinar =

Slovene sculptor

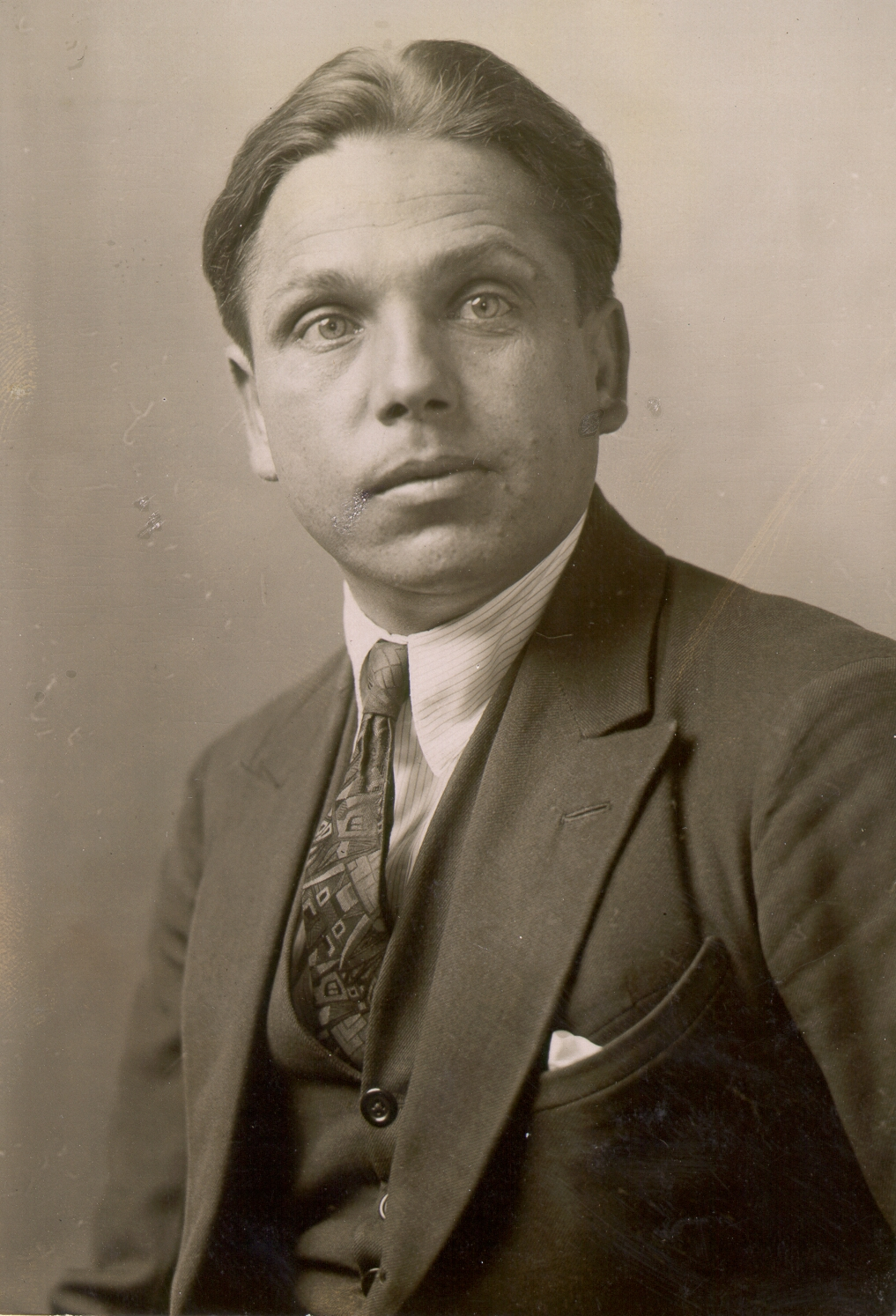

Lojze Dolinar (April 19, 1893 – September 9, 1970) was a Slovenian sculptor recognized for his impact on local and global 19th- and 20th-century art. When he moved to America he worked in architectural plastic art and thereafter in antique and modern art. In 1931 he went to Belgrade and between World War I and World War II he became one of the most sought-out monument sculptors. In 1946 he joined the Belgrade Fine Arts Academy and three years later got a professorship there. Among others he was taught by Alojzij Repič and worked with Jože Plečnik.

== Sculptures ==
1. The Blind One
2. Portrait of Rihard Jakopič
3. Janez Evangelist Krek's tombstone
4. Revolution monument, statues in Slovenian Square, Kranj
5. Two Calvary monuments in Ljubljana
6. Ivan Hribar, Sphinx and Joy
7. Fallen student-soldiers monument
8. Moses
9. A Shepherd

In 1966 his works were showcased in a Kranj special museum at the Town Hall. In 1969 he received the Prešeren Award.
