= Carlo Allegretti =

Italian painter

Carlo Allegretti (16th-17th century) was an Italian painter, mainly of sacred subjects.

== Biography ==
Allegretti was born in Monteprandone, and trained in Venice, following the style of Giacomo Bassano. In the Province of Ascoli, he left a number of works including in the church of San Agostino in Monteprandone, an Offida and an Adoration of the Magi; in the church of San Bartolomeo at Ascoli Piceno, a Martyrdom of San Bartholomew (1605–1608). His masterwork is considered to be the triptych of the Adoration of the Magi (1611) in the Cathedral of Sant'Emidio at Ascoli Piceno.
