= Emygdius =

Trier-born Roman bishop and martyr (279–309)

Saint Emygdius
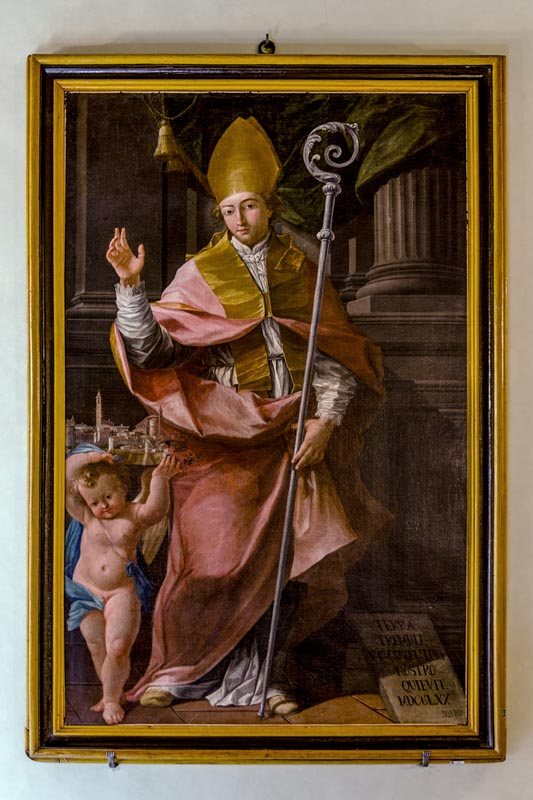
- Born: c. 279 AD; Trier
- Died: c. 309 AD (aged 29–30)
- Venerated in: Roman Catholic Church, Eastern Orthodox Church
- Major shrine: Ascoli Piceno
- Feast: 5 August; 18 August
- Attributes: Episcopal robes; palm; supporting a crumbling wall or building
- Patronage: Ascoli Piceno; Guardiagrele; Naples (co-patron); Los Angeles; invoked against earthquakes

Saint Emygdius (Latin: Emidius, Æmedius, Emigdius, Hemigidius; Italian: Sant'Emidio; c. 279 – c. 309 AD) was a Christian bishop who is venerated as a martyr. Tradition states that he was killed during the persecution of Diocletian.

== Life ==
His hagiography states that he was a pagan of Trier who became a Christian. He travelled to Rome and cured the paralytic daughter of his host Gratianus, who had let him stay with him at his house on Tiber Island. Gratianus' family then converted to Christianity.

Emygdius also cured a blind man. The people of Rome believed him to be the son of Apollo and carried him off by force to the Temple of Asclepius on the island in the Tiber, where he cured many of the sick. Emygdius declared himself a Christian and tore down the pagan altars, destroying a statue of Asclepius. He also converted many to Christianity; this enraged the prefect of the city.

He was made a bishop by Pope Marcellus I (or Pope Marcellinus), and sent to Ascoli Piceno.

On his way to Ascoli, Emydgius made more conversions, and performed a miracle where he made water gush out of a mountain after striking a cliff. Polymius, the local governor, attempted to convince Emygdius to worship Jupiter and the goddess Angitia, the patroness of Ascoli. Polymius also offered him the hand of his daughter Polisia. Instead, Emygdius baptized her as a Christian in the waters of the Tronto, along with many others.

Enraged, Polymius decapitated him on the spot now occupied by the Sant'Emidio Rosso temple, as well as his followers Eupolus (Euplus), Germanus, and Valentius (Valentinus). Emygdius stood up, and carried his own head to a spot on a mountain where he had constructed an oratory (the site of the present-day Sant'Emidio alle Grotte). After Emygdius' martyrdom, his followers attacked Polymius' palace and pulled it down.

== Veneration ==
His hagiography was written probably by a monk of Frankish origin in the eleventh century, after the rediscovery of the saint's relics, which had been conserved in a Roman sarcophagus. However, his hagiography was attributed to his disciple Valentius, who was martyred with him. The cult of Saint Emygdius is ancient, documented by churches dedicated to him since the eighth century. The translation of his relics from the catacomb of Sant'Emidio alle Grotte to the crypt of the cathedral happened probably around the year 1000 under Bernardo II, bishop of Ascoli Piceno.

In 1703, a violent earthquake occurred in the Marche, but did not affect the city of Ascoli Piceno. The city's salvation was attributed to Emygdius. He was thenceforth invoked against earthquakes, and the city dedicated a church to him in 1717. Other towns have also appointed him as patron, erecting statues in his honour in their churches (L'Aquila, 1732; Cingoli, 1747; San Ginesio, 1751; and Nocera Umbra, 1751). All Catholic churches in the State of California are mandated to commemorate his feastday, invoking his protection against earthquakes.

Emygdius is considered to have protected Ascoli from other dangers. A dazzling vision of Emygdius is said to have deterred Alaric I from destroying Ascoli in 409. The troops of Conrad II, Holy Roman Emperor passed through the region in 1038 carrying the plague; Bernardo I, bishop of Ascoli, invoked Emydgius' aid and the plague stopped. During World War II, on 3 October 1943, Emygdius is said to have protected the city against German movements against the Italian partisans.

== Gallery ==
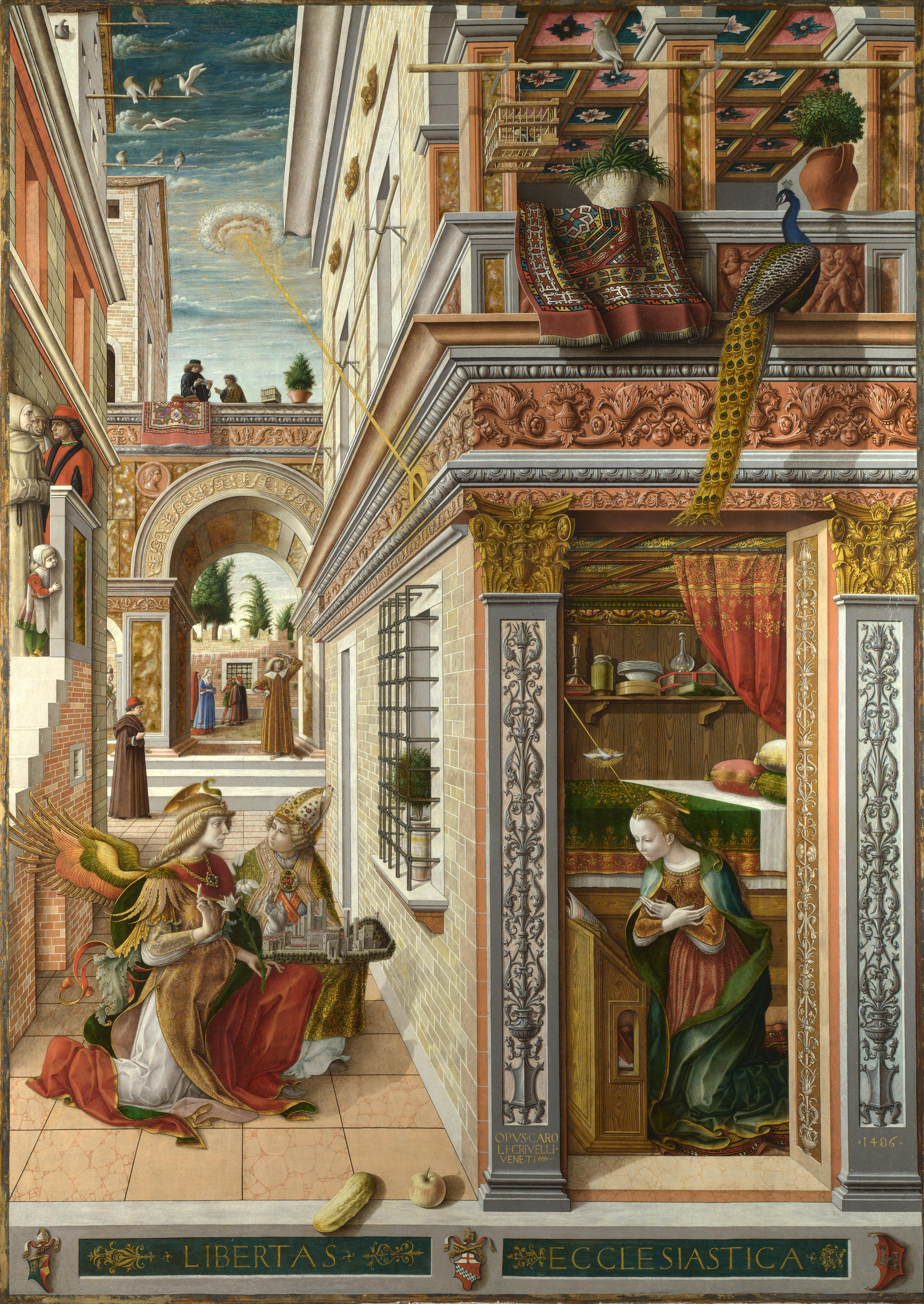
Annunciation with St. Emygdius (1486) by Carlo Crivelli

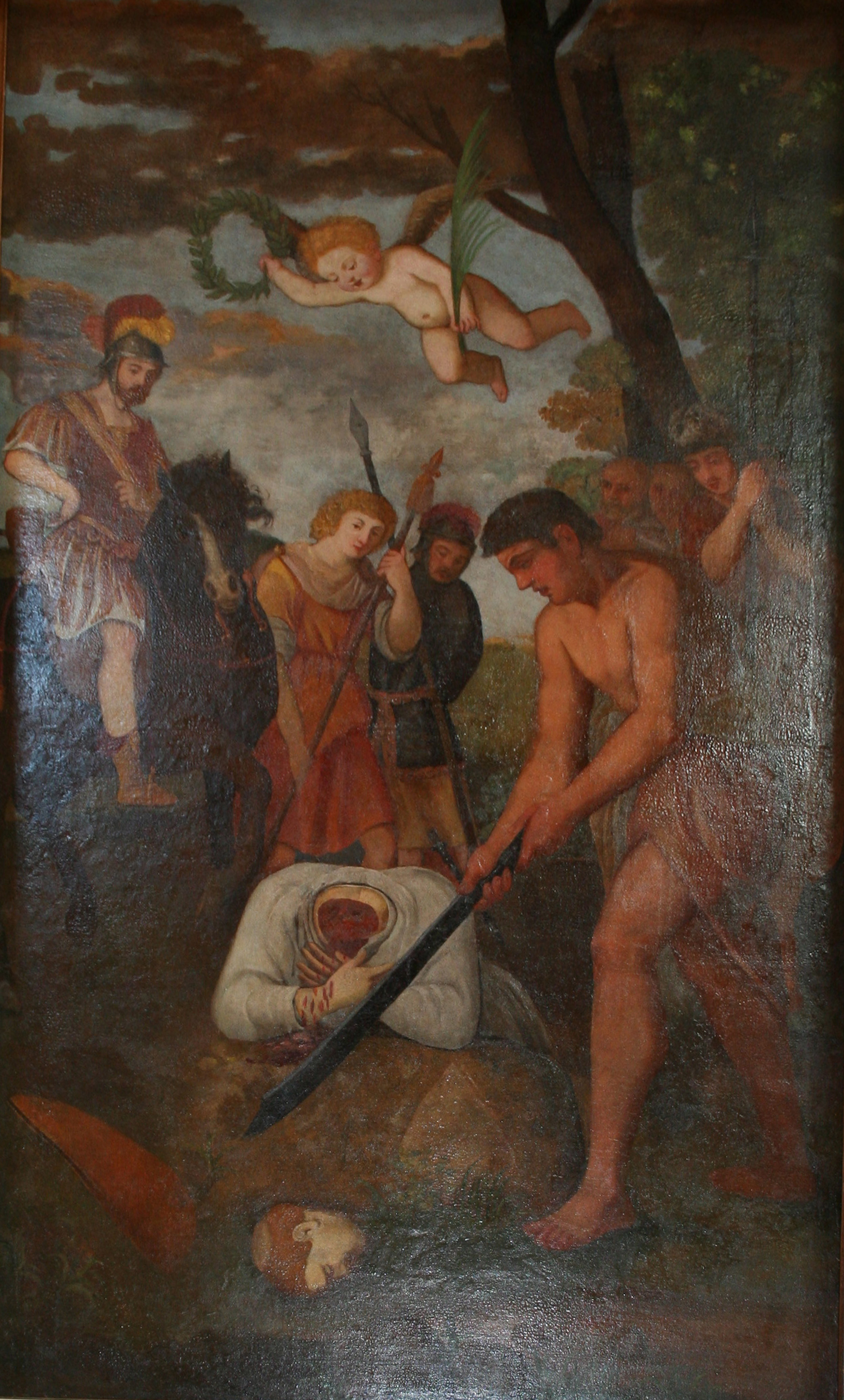
The decapitation of Saint Emygdius

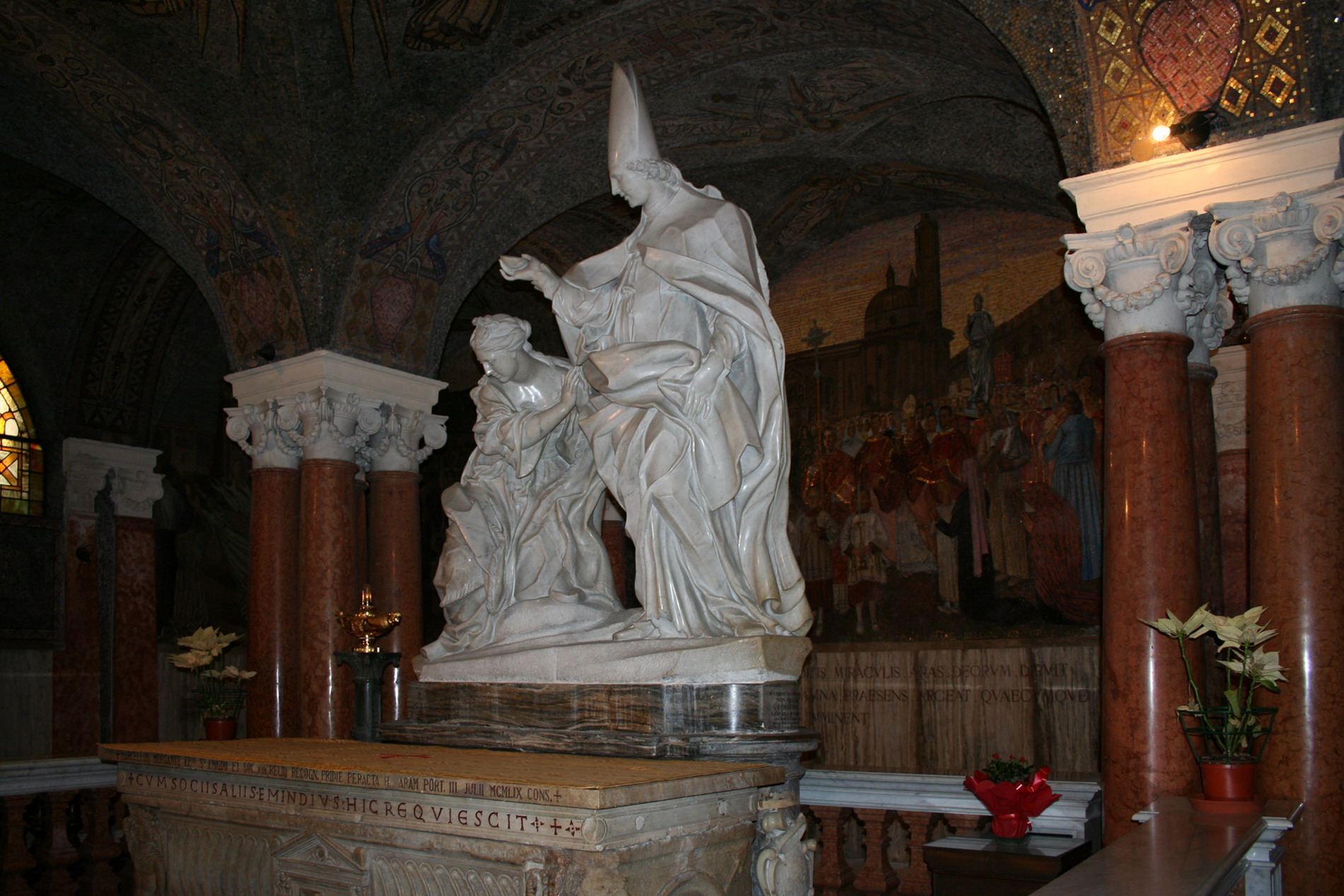
Statue of Saint Emydgius converting Polisia

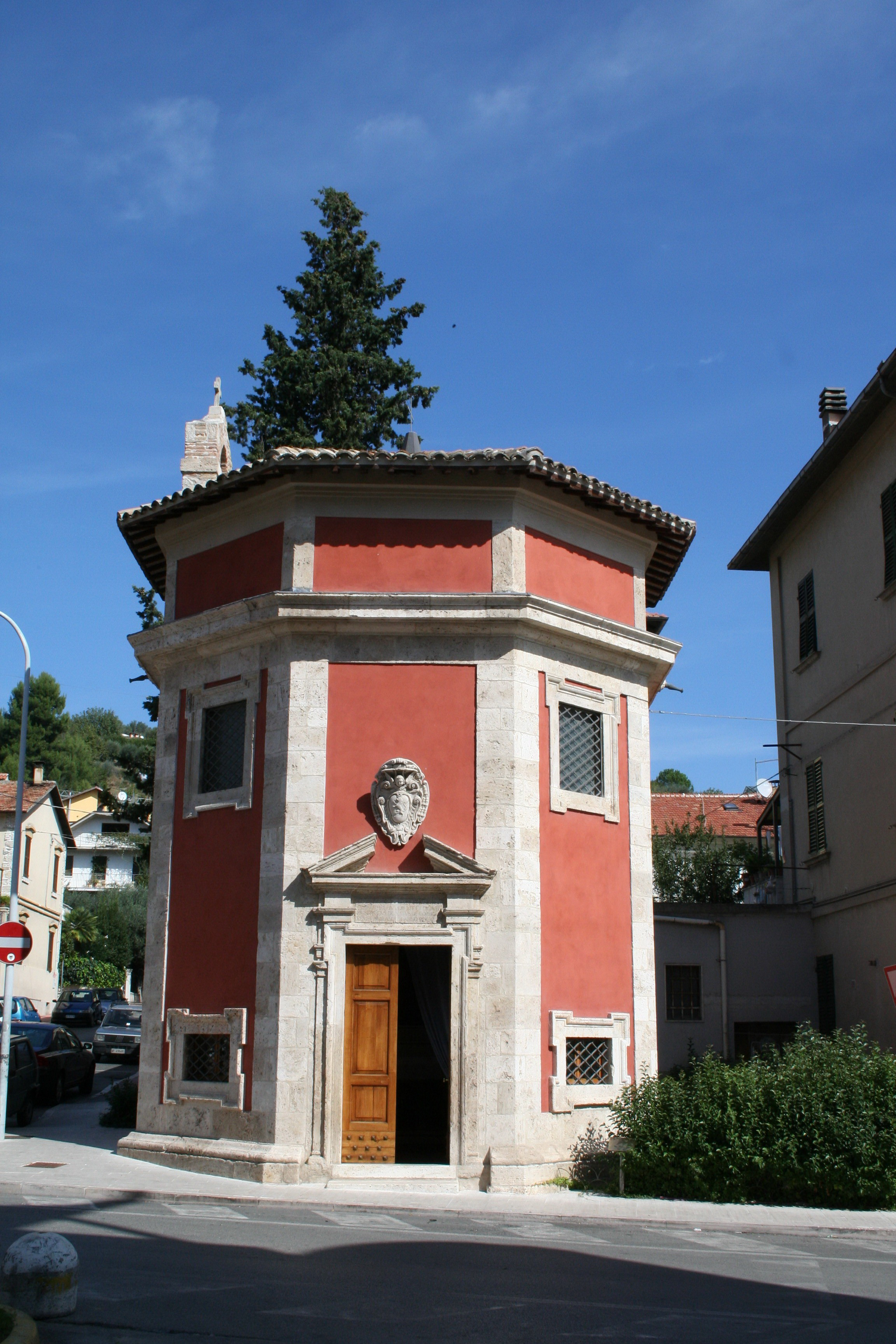
Sant'Emidio Rosso temple, Ascoli Piceno, built on the supposed spot of Emygdius' martyrdom
