= Sant'Emidio Rosso =

Roman Catholic church in Ascoli Piceno, Italy

Coordinates: 42°51′36″N 13°34′13″E

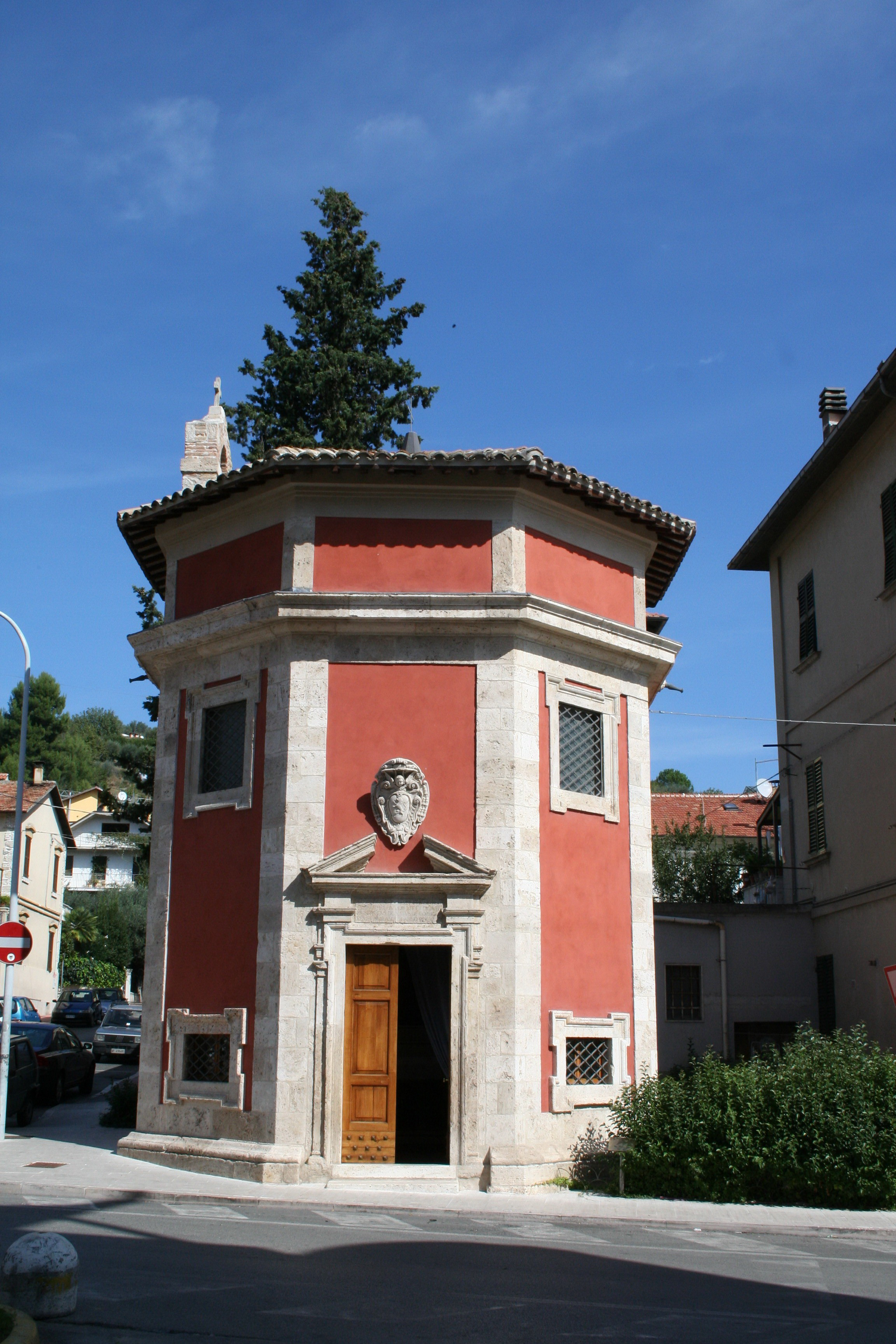
The tempietto of Sant'Emidio Rosso.

The Sant'Emidio Red Temple (Tempietto Sant'Emidio Rosso) is a church of Ascoli Piceno in Italy. Its name refers to Saint Emygdius (Emidius), patron saint of the city.
