= Ciccarelli =

Ciccarelli is an Italian surname. Notable people with the surname include:

- Alejandro Ciccarelli (1811–1879), Italian-born Chilean painter
- Aliguccio Ciccarelli (fl. 15th century), Italian painter
- Antonio Kim Ciccarelli (born 1974), Italian economist and businessman
- Dino Ciccarelli (born 1960), Canadian hockey player
- Dion Ciccarelli (born 1967), American stock car racing driver
- Margot Ciccarelli (born 1993), Brazilian jiu-jitsu competitor
- Mattia Ciccarelli (1481–1543), Italian nun
- Michael Ciccarelli (born 1996), Canadian snowboarder
- Ray Ciccarelli (born 1970), American stock car racing driver
- Tavio Ciccarelli (born 2006), Canadian soccer player

== See also ==
- Cicarelli
