= Cinzia Ferrini =

Italian professor of philosophy

Cinzia Ferrini (born October 1956) is an Italian professor of philosophy at the University of Trieste and a member of Academia Europaea.

== Life and work ==
Ferrini earned an M.A. in Philosophy with highest honors (110/110 e lode) from the University of Rome "La Sapienza" in 1982, with a thesis on La categoria della Misura nella Scienza della logica di Hegel (The Category of Measure in Hegel's Science of Logic), supervised by F. Valentini and co-supervised by N. Merker In 1989, Cinzia Ferrini completed a Ph.D. in Philosophy at the same university with a dissertation on Logica dell'Essere e concetto di Natura nel sistema hegeliano (The Logic of Being and the Concept of Nature in the Hegelian System), under the supervision of L. Lugarini.

== Selected publications ==
=== English ===
- Ferrini, Cinzia (2012). "Hegel on Nature and Spirit: Some Systematic Remarks". Hegel-Studien. 46: 117–150. ISSN 0073-1587. JSTOR 26593118.
- Ferrini, Cinzia (2011), "The Transition to Organics: Hegel's Idea of Life", A Companion to Hegel, John Wiley & Sons, Ltd, pp. 203–224, doi:10.1002/9781444397161.ch9, ISBN 978-1-4443-9716-1
- Ferrini, Cinzia (2009). "From Geological to Animal Nature in Hegel's Idea of Life". Hegel-Studien. 44: 45–94. ISSN 0073-1587.
- Ferrini, Cinzia (2009), "Reason Observing Nature", The Blackwell Guide to Hegel'sPhenomenology of Spirit, Oxford, UK: Wiley-Blackwell, pp. 92–135, doi:10.1002/9781444306224.ch5, ISBN 978-1-4443-0622-4

=== Italian ===
- Dai primi hegeliani a Hegel: per una introduzione al sistema attraverso la storia delle interpretazioni (in Italian). La città del sole. 2003. ISBN 978-88-8292-202-3.
- L'invenzione di Cartesio. La 'disembodied mind' negli studi contemporanei: eredità o mito?. ITA. 2015. ISBN 978-88-8303-709-2.

==== Critical editions ====
- Ferrini, Cinzia (1995). Guida al 'De orbitis planetarum' di Hegel ed alle sue edizioni e traduzioni. La pars destruens: confutazione dei fondamenti della meccanica celeste di Newton e dei suoi presupposti filosofici. CHE. ISBN 978-3-258-05253-3.

==== Editorials ====
- Eredità kantiane (1804-2004): questioni emergenti e problemi irrisolti (in Italian). Bibliopolis. 2004. ISBN 978-88-7088-472-2.
