= Dagoberto Ortensi =

Italian civil engineer

- Born: 16 March 1902; Jesi, Province of Ancona, Kingdom of Italy
- Died: 11 August 1975 (aged 73); Rome, Italy
- Occupation: Civil engineer

Dagoberto Ortensi (16 March 1902 – 11 August 1975) was an Italian civil engineer. His work was part of the art competitions at the 1936 Summer Olympics and the 1948 Summer Olympics.

== Life and career ==
Ortensi graduated in engineering from the Polytechnic University of Turin in 1925. In the 1930s, he became a key figure in architecture and urban planning, participating in major national competitions, such as the Palazzo del Littorio and the Palazzo della Civiltà Italiana in Rome. In 1932, he collaborated with Raffaello Fagnoni and Enrico Bianchini on the Mussolini Stadium in Turin.

After earning a teaching qualification in architectural technology at the University of Rome in 1942, Ortensi focused on designing sports facilities, including stadiums and pools, across Italy. His notable works, often in collaboration with Fagnoni and Bianchini, include the municipal stadiums in Grosseto and Arezzo.

Ortensi also received recognition in the 1948 Olympic Art Competitions and is best known for designing the large velodrome for the 1960 Rome Olympics. In 1961, he became a professor at the University of L'Aquila. He died in Rome on 11 August 1975.

== Sources ==
- "Dagoberto Ortensi". Urbanisti italiani. Istituto Nazionale di Urbanistica. 1954. p. 249.
- Maria Canella; Sergio Giuntini, eds. (2009). Sport e fascismo. Milan: FrancoAngeli.
- Alessandra Capuano (2005). Temi e figure nell'architettura romana 1944-2004. Rome: Gangemi Editore.
- Maria Luisa Neri, ed. (2012). L'altra modernità nella cultura architettonica del XX secolo. Rome: Gangemi Editore.
