= Raffaello Fagnoni =

Italian architect

- Born: 29 April 1901; Florence, Italy
- Died: 4 May 1966 (aged 65); Florence, Italy
- Occupations: Architect, urban planner

Raffaello Fagnoni (29 April 1901 – 4 May 1966) was an Italian architect and urban planner.

A graduate in Rome, he contributed to the founding of the Faculty of Architecture in Florence. His works include churches, public buildings, residential neighborhoods, sport facilities, and urban interventions. He was also involved in university development projects and infrastructure, maintaining a prominent role in Italy's architectural and academic scene until his death in Florence in 1966. His work was part of the architecture event in the art competition at the 1936 Summer Olympics.

== Works (selection) ==
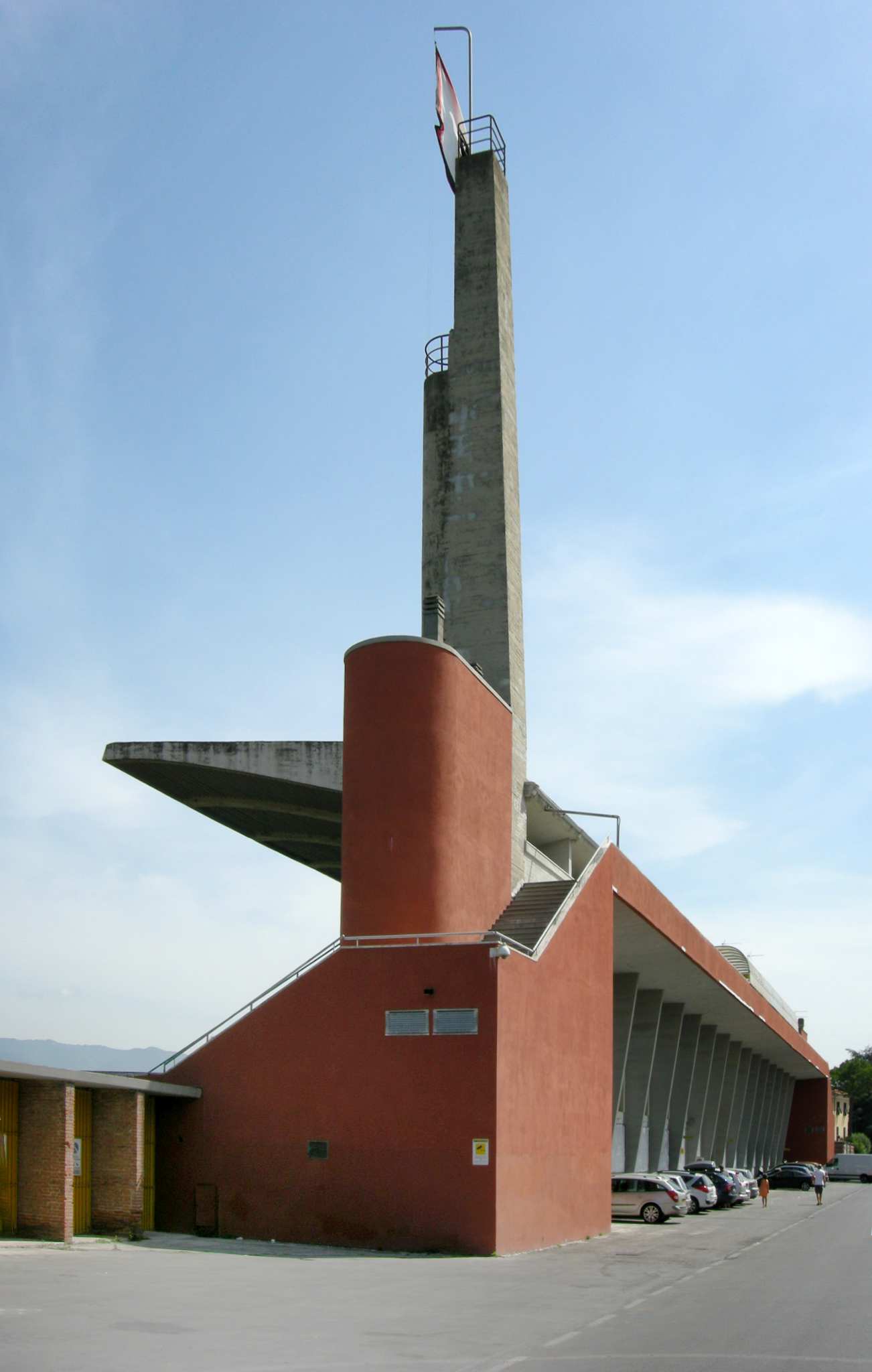
Porta Elisa Stadium in Lucca

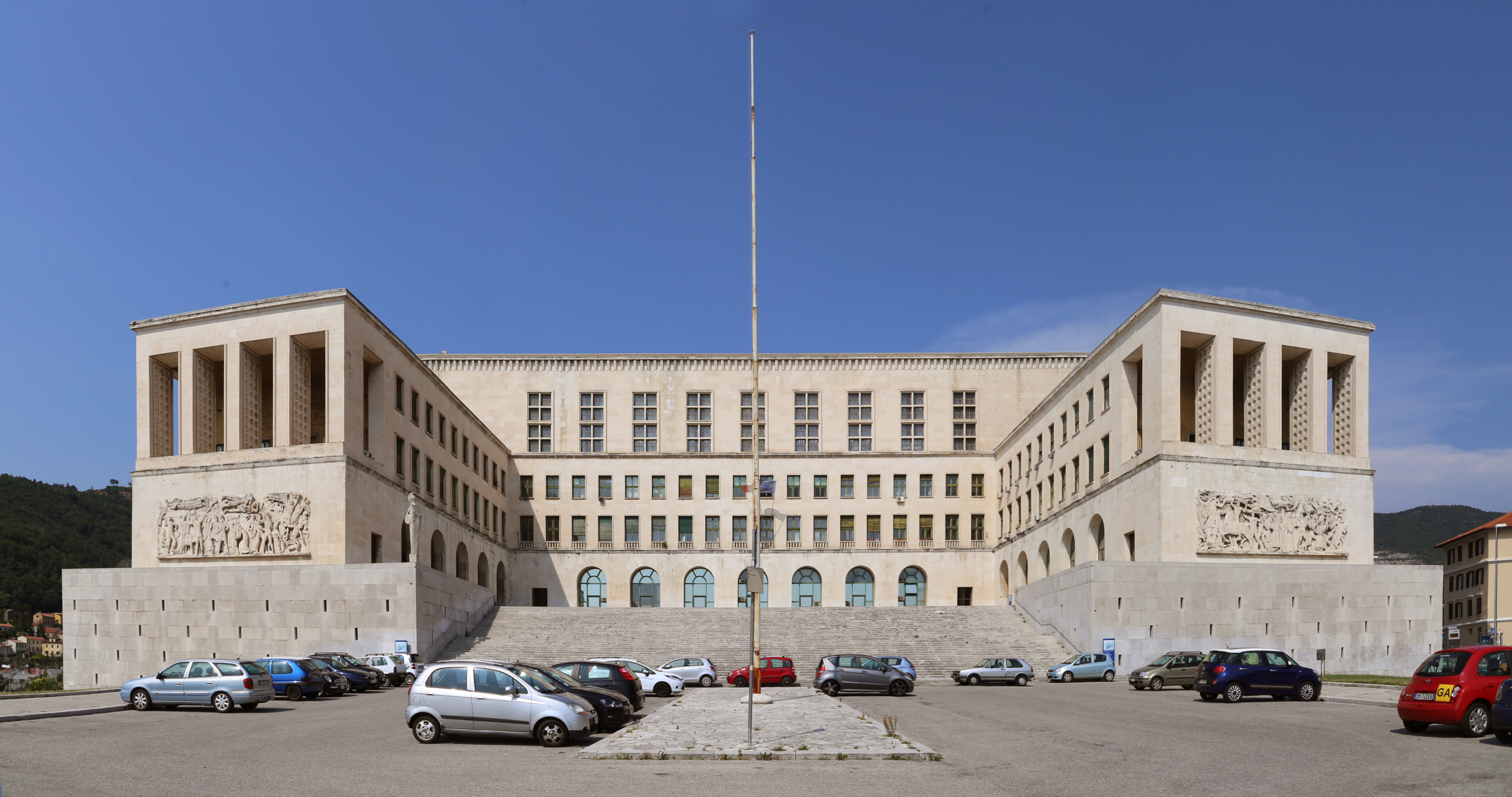
University Building, Trieste

- Restoration of the church of San Francesco, Pistoia (1926-1931)
- Male orphanage "Vittorio Alfieri", Asti (1930-1932)
- Casa del Fascio in Settignano, Florence (1929-1930)
- Opera Nazionale Balilla Building, Pistoia (with Giovanni Michelucci, 1928-1930)
- Master plan of the city of Faenza (with Enrico Bianchini, 1931)
- Olympic Stadium, Turin (with Bianchini and Dagoberto Ortensi, 1933)
- Master plan and expansion of the city of Asti (with Bianchini, 1933)
- Porta Elisa Stadium, Lucca (with Bianchini, 1934)
- Royal School of Aeronautics in Florence (with Bianchini, 1937)
- University Building, Trieste (with Bianchini and Umberto Nordio) (1938-1942)
- Casa del Fascio "Dante Rossi", Florence (1938-1940)
- Municipal Stadium, Grosseto (with Bianchini and Ortensi, 1948)
- Church of San Domenico, Cagliari (1949-1954)
- Credito Italiano Building, Livorno (1950-1954)
- Parish church of Iglesias (1951)
- Basilica of Santa Maria Assunta, Montecatini Terme (with Pierluigi Spadolini, Alfonso Stocchetti and Mario Negri, 1953-1958)
- Church of the Beata Vergine Santa Maria Addolorata, Carbonia (1954)
- Church of Gesù Divin Lavoratore, Rome (1954-1960)
- INA-CASA Coteto neighborhood, Livorno (1954-1961)
- Management Office for the Autostrada A1, Florence (1958-1962)
- CEP La Rosa neighborhood, Livorno (with Spadolini, Stocchetti and Enrico Cambi, 1958-1961)
- New obstetric-gynecological clinic at Careggi Hospital, Florence (with Spadolini, Stocchetti and Cambi, 1959-1961)
- Renovation of the Faculty of Letters at the University of Florence (1959-1962)
- Multipurpose building for the Parish of Santa Maria in Settignano, Florence (1960-1961)
- Pavesi Autogrill at Antella, Florence (1961-1962)
- INAIL Building, Florence (1963-1966)
- Church of San Giuseppe Artigiano in Montebeni, Fiesole (1965-1966)

== Sources ==
- Vittorini, Rosalia (1994). "FAGNONI, Raffaello". Dizionario Biografico degli Italiani (in Italian). Vol. 44: Fabron–Farina. Rome: Istituto dell'Enciclopedia Italiana. ISBN 978-88-12-00032-6.
