= Darko Bratina =

Italian sociologist, film theorist and politician

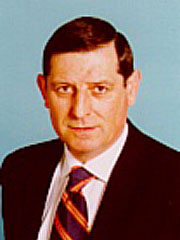
Diodato "Darko" Bratina

Darko Bratina (30 March 1942 – 23 September 1997) was an Italian sociologist, film theorist and politician of Slovene ethnicity. Between 1992 and 1997, he served as member of the Italian Senate.

== Early life and intellectual endeavours ==
He was born to a Slovene-speaking family in Gorizia, Italy. Because of the Fascist Italianization laws, his parents could not baptise him with a Slovene name, so he was named Diodato Bratina, which remained his official name throughout his life. His Slovene name was Božidar, but mostly used his nickname Darko.

He attended Slovene language elementary and middle high school in Gorizia, before enrolling in the University of Trieste, where he studied civil engineering. During the stay in Trieste, he became interested in social sciences and philosophy. He left the study of engineering, and enrolled in the University of Trento where he studied study sociology at the prestigious High Institute of Social Sciences (Istituto Superiore di Scienze Sociali), where he met his eventual wife, with whom he had three children. He graduated with a thesis on the comparative social structure of ethnic minorities in Europe. He continued as a lecturer at FIAT Industrial Administrative School. During his stay in Turin, he became influenced by the thought of the Christian left intellectual Felice Balbo who sought to combine Marxist activism and the Catholic doctrines of faith.

In the same years, Bratina became interested in film theory. He organized several regional film festivals throughout northern Italy (especially in Veneto, Trentino, and his native Friuli-Venezia Giulia). Among others, he translated the Sociology of Film of the Canadian sociologist Ian Jarvie from English to Italian.

Starting from mid '70s, he lectured social theory at the University of Trieste, and later on he also collaborated in several research projects with the Slovene Research Institute (SLORI), which he directed in the '80s. After the decomposition of former Yugoslavia and Soviet Union in 1991, he was a fervent supporter of the integration of new member states into the European Union. On the local level, he proposed the gradual administrative and infrastructural unification of the Italian town of Gorizia with the bordering Slovenian towns of Nova Gorica and Šempeter, thus establishing a transnational metropolitan area.

== Political career ==
Bratina first entered politics in 1984, when he ran for the European Parliament as an independent candidate within the list of Italian Communist Party (PCI) with the support of the Slovene Union. Although he was not elected, his candidature was a success, as he received the highest number of preferential votes in the whole Friuli-Venezia Giulia. In 1991, he joined the Democratic Party of the Left. In the parliamentary elections of 1992, he ran successfully for the Italian Senate, despite not being supported by the Slovene Union this time. He was re-elected twice, in the elections of 1994 and again in 1996. From November 1996 until his death in September 1997, he also served as member of the Parliamentary Assembly of the Council of Europe.

He died of heart attack during a visit to Obernai, France, near Strasbourg, where he had just had a speech at the Council of Europe in the same morning. After a by-election, Demetrio Volcic replaced him in the Italian Senate.

== Sources ==
- Biographical entry in the 'Primorski slovenski biografski leksikon', pp. 488-489
