= Trieste Courthouse =

Building in Trieste, Italy

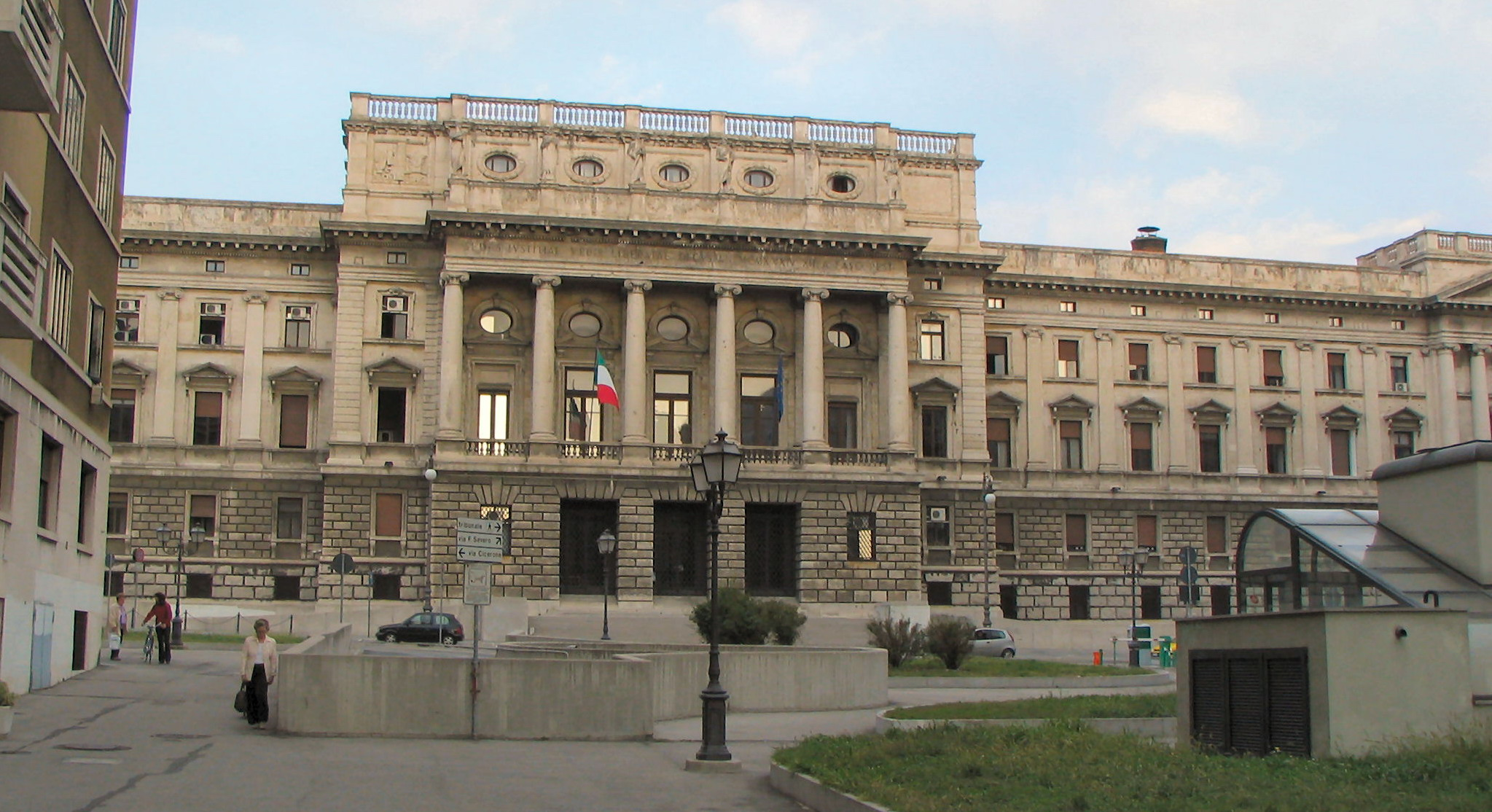
- Interactive map of the Trieste Courthouse area

General information
- Location: Trieste, Friuli-Venezia Giulia, Italy
- Coordinates: 45°39′18.4″N 13°46′46.1″E
- Construction started: 1912
- Completed: 1934
- Inaugurated: 27 October 1929; 96 years ago

Design and construction
- Architects: A. Spinnler, Enrico Nordio, Umberto Nordio

The Trieste Courthouse (Palazzo di Giustizia) is a building located on Via Foro Ulpiano in Trieste, Italy.

== History ==
The idea of building a single structure to house the judicial offices was conceived in 1895, but construction did not begin until 1912 due to bureaucratic and financial delays between local authorities and the Austro-Hungarian government. The initial project was designed by architect Spinnler of the Building Directorate for Justice Palaces in Marburg an der Drau.

World War I interrupted the construction, which was later resumed and revised following Trieste's incorporation into the Kingdom of Italy. In 1919, the Royal Government of Venezia Giulia tasked architect Enrico Nordio with reworking the facades and interiors, while maintaining the overall design of the building. The palace was inaugurated on 27 October 1929 but was not fully completed until 1934, when six statues of Roman law scholars, created by sculptors Franco Asco and Marcello Mascherini, were placed on the rooftop.

In May 1945, the palace was occupied by the Germans and later besieged by Italian partisans and Allied troops. After the German surrender, Yugoslav troops established a military government in Trieste and set up a People's Court, which was later dissolved by the Anglo-Americans following the Belgrade Agreement (9 June 1945), leading to the creation of the Allied Military Government. With the Treaty of Peace in 1947, the Free Territory of Trieste was established, divided into Zone A (under Anglo-American administration) and Zone B (under Yugoslav control). However, the appointed governor was never named, and administration remained under military command. In 1954, with the London Memorandum, Trieste was finally returned to Italian administration, restoring normal judicial organization.

In 1960, architect Umberto Nordio oversaw the reconstruction and furnishing of the Court of Assizes, completing the architectural and symbolic work on the building.

== Description ==
The courthouse stands on an area previously known as Piazza dei Foraggi (or del Fieno), now Foro Ulpiano. The building is a grand monumental complex, constructed in a classical style but later modified in a nationalist key after Trieste's transition to Italy.

The original design featured an austere and symmetrical facade with a front colonnade and a series of internal courtyards. The 1919 design by architect Enrico Nordio focused mainly on decorating the facades, internal staircases, and courtyards, while preserving the existing structure.

The palace was completed with large staircases, beams for elevators, and, most notably, six monumental statues of famous Roman jurists placed on the rooftop. These statues―Salvius Julianus, Gaius, Julius Paulus, Papinian, Tribonian, and Ulpian―gave their name to the new square in front of the building, Foro Ulpiano, which replaced the old name in 1919.

The interior of the building was progressively finished through the 1960s, with particular attention given to the reconstruction of the Court of Assizes, which was redesigned by Umberto Nordio, who also oversaw its furnishings.
