= Enrico Bianchini =

Italian engineer (1903–1971)

- Born: 30 July 1903; Robbio, Province of Pavia, Kingdom of Italy
- Died: 24 October 1971 (aged 68); Florence, Italy
- Occupation: Civil engineer

Enrico Bianchini (30 July 1903 – 24 October 1971) was an Italian civil engineer. His work was part of the architecture event in the art competition at the 1936 Summer Olympics.

== Life and career ==
Born in Robbio, in the province of Pavia, on 30 July 1903, Bianchini completed his early studies in Massa. He initially attended the art history course at the University of Pisa (1920–1922) before enrolling in the School of Engineering in Rome, where he graduated in civil engineering on 22 April 1926. From August of that year, he worked with the engineering firm Poggi, Gaudenzi & C., which later hired him as a designer and site manager in 1927, a role he held until 1938. During this time, he oversaw numerous projects, including industrial buildings, cinemas, and bridges.

Between 1929 and 1931, he collaborated on the construction of artistic features of the A11 Highway with the Saverio Parisi firm.

Bianchini also partnered with architect Raffaello Fagnoni for nearly two decades. Together, they drafted urban plans for Pisa, Faenza, and Asti; contributed to the Mussolini Stadium in Turin and the municipal stadium in Lucca; restored historical buildings; and designed public works such as Carabinieri barracks and railway stations. Bianchini focused on reinforced concrete structures, such as the University of Trieste building and various Fascist-era projects in Florence and other cities.

After 1938, he became technical director of the SACIP company. Post-World War II, Bianchini led the construction of industrial, residential, and civic projects, including factories, stadiums, public housing, and power plants across Tuscany. He also worked independently on villas and residential complexes in the region.

== Sources ==
- Gabriella Carapelli, ed. (2006). L'archivio di Enrico Bianchini, ingegnere e impresario. Un capitolo della storia del cemento armato in Toscana. Florence: Mandragora.
- Elisabetta Insabato; Cecilia Gelli, eds. (2007). Guida agli archivi di architetti e ingegneri del Novecento in Toscana. Florence: Edifir.
