= MIB School of Management Trieste =

Private management university in Italy

MIB Trieste School of Management
- Motto: Recta Tueri (Latin)
- Motto in English: Protect the Right
- Type: Private
- Established: 1988; 38 years ago
- Affiliations: Association of MBAs, European Foundation for Management Development
- Dean: Andrea Tracogna
- Location: Trieste, Friuli-Venezia Giulia, Italy
- Campus: Urban
- Colors: Green and white
- Website: http://www.mib.edu/

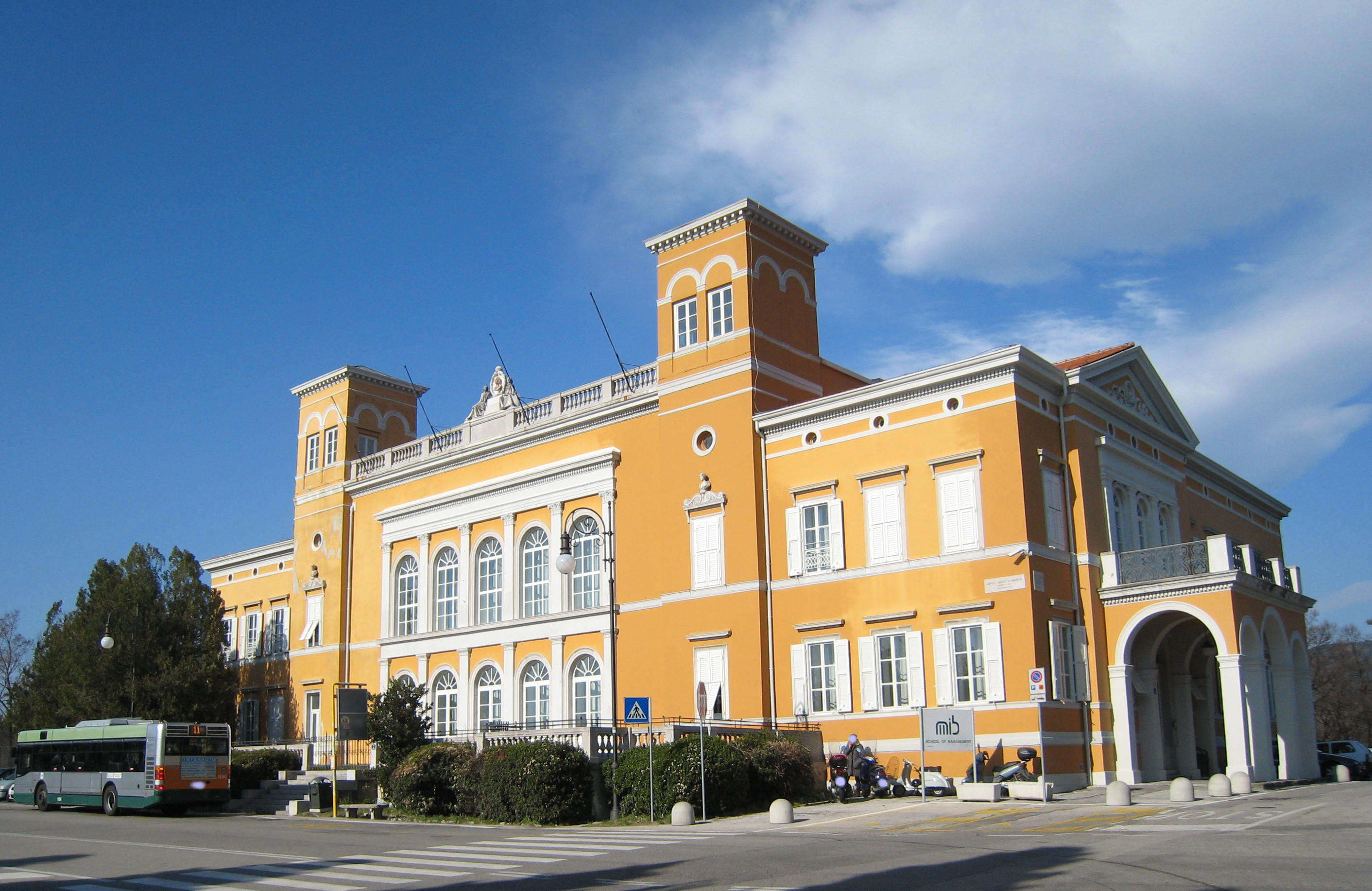
Ferdinandeo's Palace, the headquarters of the School

MIB School of Management Trieste is an international business and management university located in Trieste, Italy. The School was founded in 1988 as a bridge institution between universities, research centers and the business world. It has since become one Italy's leading management schools, specializing in International Master of Business Administration degrees, as well as degrees in business innovation and insurance. The School has an international profile, as 51% of attendants are international students from over 100 countries.

== History ==
MIB began its history as an initiative between major companies and the academic world in 1988. Within two years the school was offering its first masters programs in international business. Over time, the school has become much more globalized, with a focus on English-language programs and an emphasis on the international business landscape. The school currently has partnerships with organizations such as the University of Trieste, the Generali Group, Allianz, KPMG, and Illy.

MIB has an active presence in the insurance sphere, as it is home to the Centre for Insurance Research, whose goal is to "propose itself as a partner for private and public organizations to promote the sector's growth and innovation, increase its social contribution, and spread the insurance culture." Additionally, MIB is known for its focus on digital innovation and emerging global trends.

== Current Programs ==
MIB currently offers the following programs:

- International Master of Business Administration - double degree with the University of Trieste
- Executive Master of Business Administration (with an option to specialize in Business Innovation)
- Master in Insurance & Risk Management
- Executive Master in Insurance & Finance

In addition, the School offers open programs including an executive program in agile management engineering, and a wine business management program. MIB also offers the Origini Italia program, which allows descendants of Italian emigrants to travel to Trieste and complete an export management and entrepreneurial development program, free of charge.

== Campus ==
MIB Trieste is located at the Ferdinandeo palace, built in 1858 in honor of Emperor Ferdinand I of Austria. The building came under the possession of the School in 1997, with restoration completed in 1999. In 2010 the School expanded into a modern Pavilion across from the Ferdinandeo.
