= Enrico Nordio =

Italian architect (1851–1923)

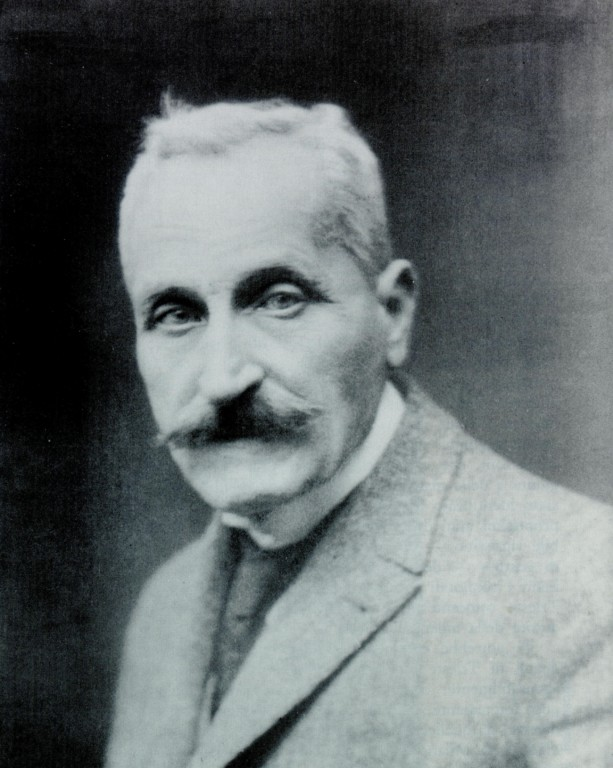
- Born: Federico Nordio; 24 September 1851; Trieste, Austria-Hungary
- Died: 3 December 1923 (aged 72); Trieste, Kingdom of Italy
- Occupation(s): Architect, restorer

Enrico Nordio (24 September 1851 – 3 December 1923) was an Italian architect and restorer.

== Life and career ==
Though named Federico at birth, he was known as Enrico in memory of his late twin brother. He studied painting and drawing under Karl Friedrich Haase before apprenticing with architect-engineer Giovanni Righetti. He later attended the School of Architecture at the Academy of Fine Arts in Vienna under Friedrich von Schmidt, participating in major restoration, including the Vienna City Hall and St. Stephen's Cathedral.

From 1879 to 1889, Nordio directed the vocational school of stonework in Trento and was involved in restoration work, including the city's cathedral. Returning to Trieste in 1887, he taught at the Imperial-Royal School of Applied Arts and designed important buildings such as the Cassa di Risparmio building (1891–94), the Creditanstalt building (1907–10), and the Courthouse (1913), later completed by his son Umberto.

His architectural style transitioned from historicism to incorporate Neo-Renaissance and early modernist elements. As a conservator for the Austrian Central Commission from 1902 until his death, he oversaw monument preservation in Istria and the Adriatic region. He died in Trieste in 1923.

== Sources ==
- Contessi, Gianni (1992). "Enrico Nordio". In Sergio Polano; Luciano Semerani (eds.). Guida critica all'architettura contemporanea. Friuli Venezia Giulia. Venice: Arsenale. pp. 47–53.
- Scarrocchia, Sandro (2013). "NORDIO, Enrico". Dizionario Biografico degli Italiani (in Italian). Vol. 78: Natta–Nurra. Rome: Istituto dell'Enciclopedia Italiana. ISBN 978-88-12-00032-6.
