= Stadio Olimpico Grande Torino =

Stadium at Turin, Italy

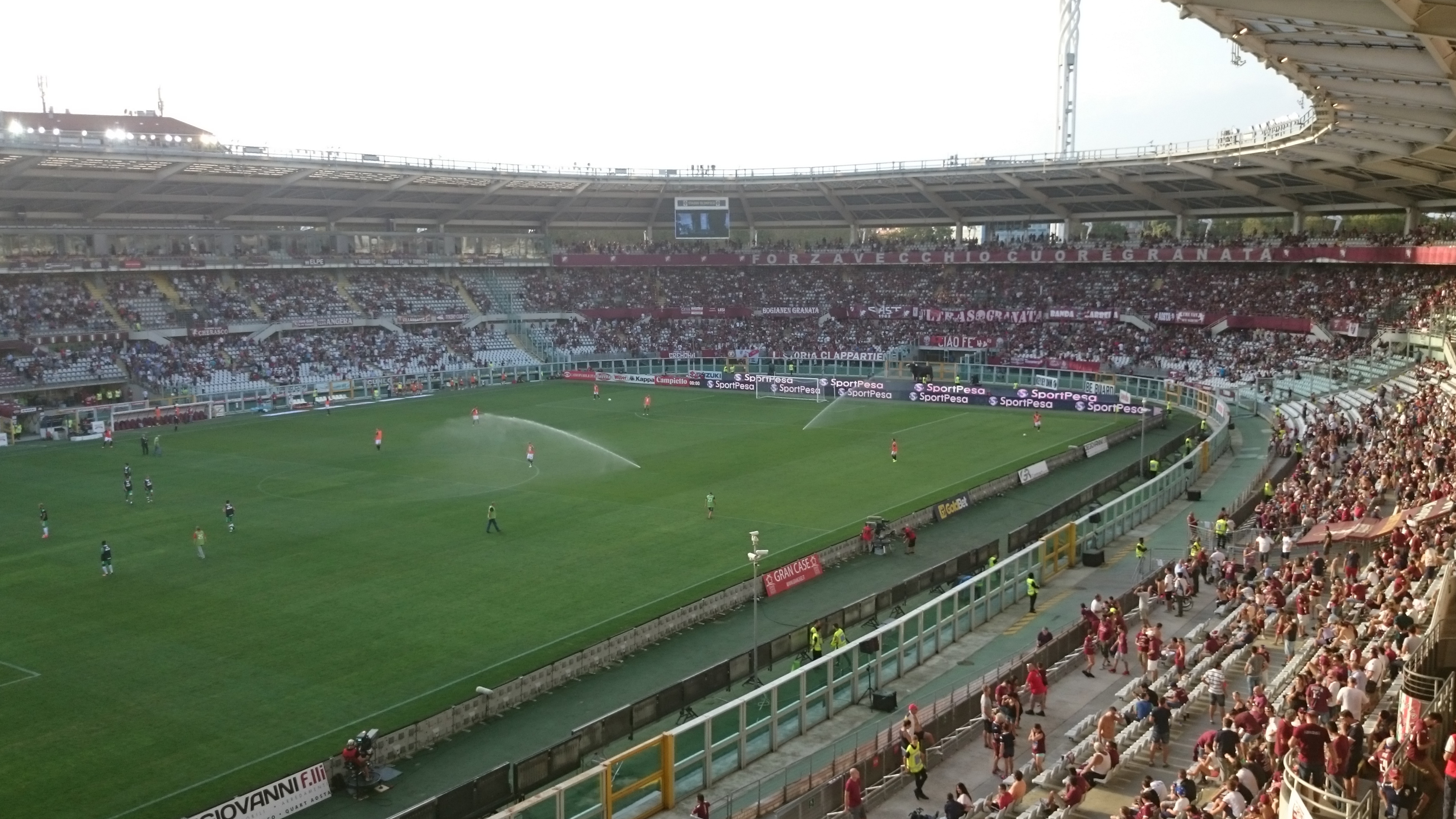
- UEFA
- Interactive map of Stadio Olimpico Grande Torino
- Full name: Stadio Olimpico Grande Torino
- Former names: Stadio Municipale Benito Mussolini; Stadio Comunale Vittorio Pozzo
- Location: Turin, Italy
- Coordinates: 45°2′30″N 7°39′0″E
- Owner: City of Turin (1933–present)
- Capacity: 28,177
- Surface: Grass
- Field size: 105 m x 68 m

Construction
- Built: September 1932 – May 1933
- Opened: May 14, 1933; 93 years ago
- Renovated: 2006; 20 years ago
- Architects: Raffaello Fagnoni, Enrico Bianchini, Dagoberto Ortensi

Tenants
- Torino (1958–1959, 1963–1990, 2006–present); Juventus (1933–1990, 2006–2011); Italy national football team (selected matches)

The Stadio Olimpico Grande Torino (English: Great Turin Olympic Stadium), named after the Grande Torino team, is a multi-purpose stadium located in Turin, Italy. It is the home ground of Serie A club Torino Football Club. The stadium is located in Piazzale Grande Torino, in the district of Santa Rita, in the south-central area of the city. The stadium is currently rated by UEFA as a Category 4 stadium, the highest ranking possible.

Constructed in the 1930s, and originally known as the Stadio Municipale Benito Mussolini (or colloquially the Stadio Municipale) and later the Stadio Comunale, it was the home of Juventus and Torino until the 1990s, when it was abandoned in favour of the bigger and more modern Stadio delle Alpi. After a sixteen-year stint without Serie A football, the stadium was renovated and renamed the "Stadio Olimpico" on the occasion of the 2006 Winter Olympics. In a reversal of 1990, both Juventus and Torino moved back to the Olimpico during the demolition of the Stadium and the construction of the Juventus Arena at the same place, with Juventus using it until the end of the 2010–11 season, and Torino retaining it as their home stadium to the present day.

== History ==
=== The original project: Stadio Municipale Benito Mussolini ===
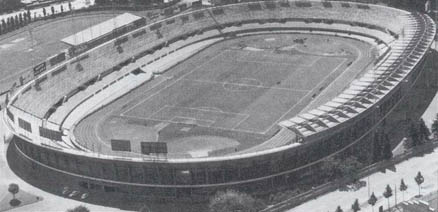
Aerial view of the Municipal stadium during the 1930s

The stadium was originally named after Benito Mussolini, and was built to host the Littoriali Games of the fascist year XI, held in 1933 and the World Student Games in the same year.

The Municipal Administration, to shorten the construction time, announced a competition and divided the work among three companies: the stadium (stands, bleachers, and internal works) was entrusted to Saverio Parisi of Rome (and designed by the architect Raffaello Fagnoni and engineers Enrico Bianchini and Dagoberto Ortensi); the athletic field, the Tower of Marathon, and the ticket offices to Eng. Vannacci and Lucherini (project architect Brenno Del Giudice, Prof. Colonnetti and Eng. Vannacci), and the indoor pool to the Eng. E. Faletti Company (project architect Bonicelli and Eng. Villanova). The Eng. Guido De Bernardi Company undertook the preparation of fields and slopes.

Work began in September 1932. The stadium was inaugurated on 14 May 1933 by the Secretary of the National Fascist Party, Achille Starace, at the beginning of the Littoriali. The first soccer match played in the new stadium was between Juventus and Hungary's Újpest FC (6–2), the return leg of the quarter-finals of the Central European Cup, on 29 June 1933.

=== Stadio Mussolini during the 1930s ===
The original design stage consisted of an ellipsoid ring whose major perimeter was about 640 metres. The base consisted of a tier of white granite, on which a red plaster plinth rested. The 45 degree sloped stands were formed of the same material, delimiting three glass strips for the lighting of the interior, and crowned by a white parapet. Large windows overlooked the field, bounded by concrete pillars that supported the terminal cantilever, which protruded by more than three meters with an inclination of 45 degrees. Access to the interior were made through 27 openings, the main of which led to the grandstand, equipped with a weatherproof roof. The parterre was partly covered by cantilevered terraces that projected over it and was slightly raised in the farthest part from the field.

The playing field measures 70 x 105 metres, surrounded by an athletics track with six lanes, and pits for the shot put and discus, track for the long jump and the top corner. Initially, the curves of the athletics track were designed with three centres. After protests from the national executive Massimo Cartasegna (who had participated as an athlete in the 1908 Summer Olympics), they were redesigned to a single centre. The result, however, was that the track had an abnormal length of 446.38 metres.

=== The post-war municipal stadium ===
After the stadium's inauguration it hosted several matches of the 1934 FIFA World Cup, held in Italy. In the 1934–35 season, the Stadio Olimpico di Torino began to host matches for the League Cup.

From the late 1950s, until the 1989–90 season, the stadium hosted the home games of both Turin teams in the Italian championship. The stadium was then abandoned in favor of the Stadio delle Alpi, built for the 1990 FIFA World Cup. Between 1935 and 1986, Juventus were Italian champions 16 times (including five consecutive titles between 1931 and 1935), and won the Coppa Italia seven times, several international titles, and one UEFA Cup (1976). For their part, between 1935 and 1976, Torino were six-time Italian champions (also with five consecutive titles, between 1945 and 1949), and won four Italian Cups in the stadium.

From 1938 until the late 1950s, the stadium also housed the headquarters of the provisional Automobile Museum (opened in 1939).

It served as the main venue of the Summer Universiade two times in 1959 and 1970, hosted the 1970 Women's World Cup Final. In the 1980s the stadium was renamed "Vittorio Pozzo", in homage to the coach who was twice World Champion with the Italy national football team in 1934 and 1938, who also coached Torino between 1912 and 1922.

With the construction of bigger and more modern Stadio delle Alpi, the Communale Stadium was used less, only accommodating the Juventus coaching activities (until 2003) and, from 2004, those of Torino.

=== Reconstruction for the 2006 Winter Olympics ===
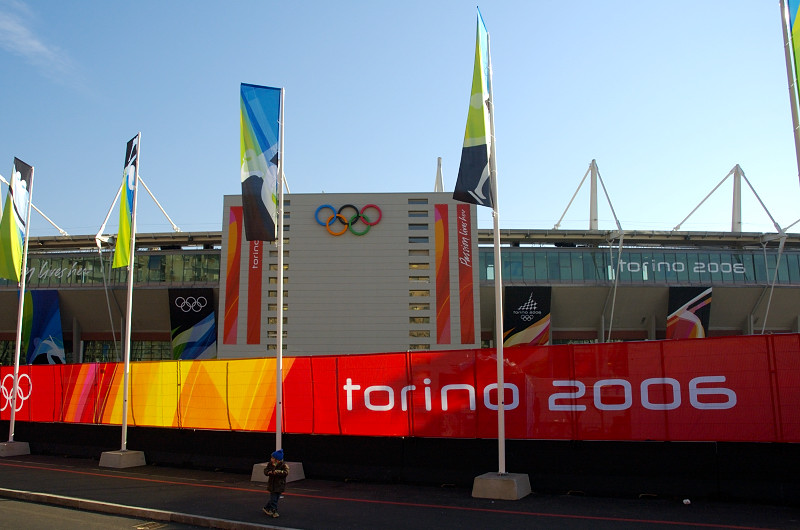
The stadium during the 2006 Winter Olympics

In 1998, when Turin was bidding to host the 2006 Winter Olympics, the Stadium and its surroundings were originally planned to be involved in the event, as the opening and closing ceremonies are originally scheduled for the Stadio Delle Alpi and a multiuse arena was planned to be built in another neighborhood of the city. Eventually, the city ended up winning the bid process and when the plans were executed it was realized that they would not be viable.In this way, several possibilities were studied, but like other cities that hosted the Games, it was decided to rehabilitate the City's Municipal Stadium, which was in terrible conditions. And this involved building a new multipurpose arena in the area next to an outdoor pool that was only used in the summer months.

Following agreements with the City and the involved parts, entrusted the Stadio delle Alpi to Juventus, the Municipal Stadium was assigned to Torino, and had to be reconstructed and would be operational in late 2005. As a change of host venue to the opening and closing ceremonies of the 2006 Winter Olympics The agreement still involved the construction of a multipurpose arena to receive ice hockey games and remain as a legacy in the city. However,due to the non-registration of the company grenade Championship (sanctioned definitively 9 August 2005), the City of Turin is the owner of the stadium after the complete reconstruction.

The renovation project, supervised by Verona architects Giovanni Cenna Architetto e Arteco, based on Barcelona's Estadi Olímpic Lluís Companys restoration project, maintained the existing structures, subject to the constraints of the Superintendency of Environmental and Architectural Heritage, and added new structures to complete the coverage of the entire structure, and a third ring of tiers structurally continuous with the existing roof and with a closed section hosting 44 boxes. Approximately one third of the lining of the roof is translucent plastic, to avoid as much as possible damage caused to the turf due to less sunlight from the shadow of the roof. The total capacity is 27,168 seats, all covered and seated, lower more than the half of the original capacity (originally the facility could accommodate 65,000 people standing) to meet modern safety standards.

For the opening and closing ceremonies of the Olympic Games and the opening of the Paralympics, around 8,000 temporary chairs were placed on the stadium field, in addition to huge metallic structures that were added to be used during the events. With this, totaling a capacity of 35,000 people to meet the minimum requirements of the International Olympic Committee and transform the ceremonies into something more intimate than the previous ones.

The modernization efforts, included in the internal structure of the Stadium, a new main building on the ground floor of a commercial area of 1,163 square meters; in the north-west, also restored and relocated were the center of sports medicine, all services and offices. Outside was built a new Olympic Park and a new multipurpose arena that hosted the ice hockey tournament during the Winter Olympics. The building and all the whole area around was designed by Arata Isozaki of Japan.

The renovation of the stadium cost near 30 million euros. The Olympic Stadium was officially opened in on 29 November 2005 in a ceremony attended by representatives of italian and local government, the International Olympic Committee members and the TOROC.

=== Return of football (2006–present) ===
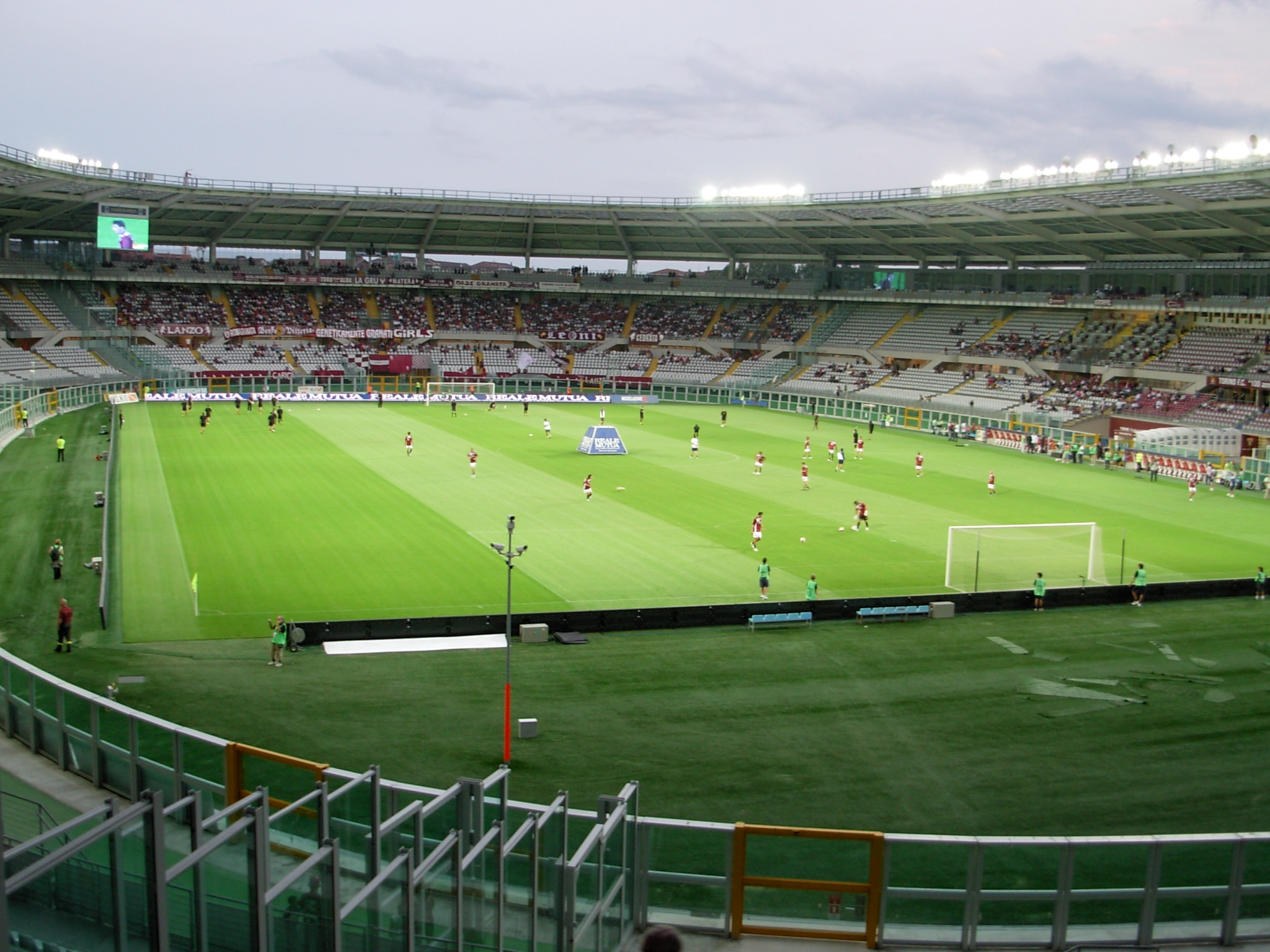
A Torino match in 2007

After the 2006 Winter Olympics, the stadium returned to hosting football matches of Torino and Juventus. In 2011, Juventus moved to its new stadium, Juventus Stadium, on the site of Stadio delle Alpi. At the end of the ground-share, Torino can decide to purchase the facility and could rename it "Olympic Stadium Grande Torino", said Mario Pescante on the occasion of the inauguration of the renovated stadium.

Despite having physically eliminated the athletics track (in its place is a carpet of synthetic grass), the distance between the stands and the pitch has not changed. This caused disappointment among fans, who would have preferred to have the stands closer to the field, as in United Kingdom. However, during the restructuring held after the Winter Olympics, a new parterre was built, bringing the crowd closer to the front rows. 80 seats are reserved for disabled spectators in wheelchairs, including 64 located in two tribunes raised in the parterre of the first ring of separate stations, 12 in the grandstand and 4 in the boxes.

The Olympic Stadium was the first stadium in Italy to fully comply with the dictates of the "Pisanu Law" on stadium security. More than 80 surveillance cameras allow the police to locate and identify perpetrators of violence. The glass enclosure that separates the field from the spectators area, is movable. It is 2.2 metres (7 ft 3 in) high, but during games that do not raise risk of public policy may be lowered to 1.1 metres (3 ft 7 in). Furthermore, the use of technology was high: heating coils were placed below the field for use during cold temperatures and, in case of rain, an automatic system can cover the ground.

During its first two years of use, from 2006 to 2008, two separate security zones separated the opposing fans; the actual capacity was limited to 25,500 seats. During the summer of 2008 extensive renovations were made, in view of the return of Juventus to the Champions League. 1,350 new seats were installed on strategic places, in four rows behind the first row of the gallery, creating a new ring on the area of the old track. To promote visibility of spectators in these new rows, barriers have been lowered to 1.10 meters, compared to the previous 2.20 meters. Finally, 650 seats were recovered with the downsizing of guest areas. The capacity thus became approximately 27,500 seats.

During the summer of 2009, more work was performed. The parapet separation was lowered to 1.10 meters in all sectors and 444 new seats were added in the parterre, bringing the total stadium capacity to 27,994 seats. Moreover, in the summer of 2012, have been eliminated also the barriers that divided the Curva Maratona with Maratona Laterale (formerly the guest's sector in the home matches of Juventus in the same season moved to the new Juventus Stadium), allowing a further increase in capacity from 27,994 places in 2009, to 28,140 today.

In April 2016, the Olimpico was renamed the Stadio Olimpico Grande Torino in honour of the side from the 1940s.

== Stands ==
=== Curva Maratona (Curva Nord) ===
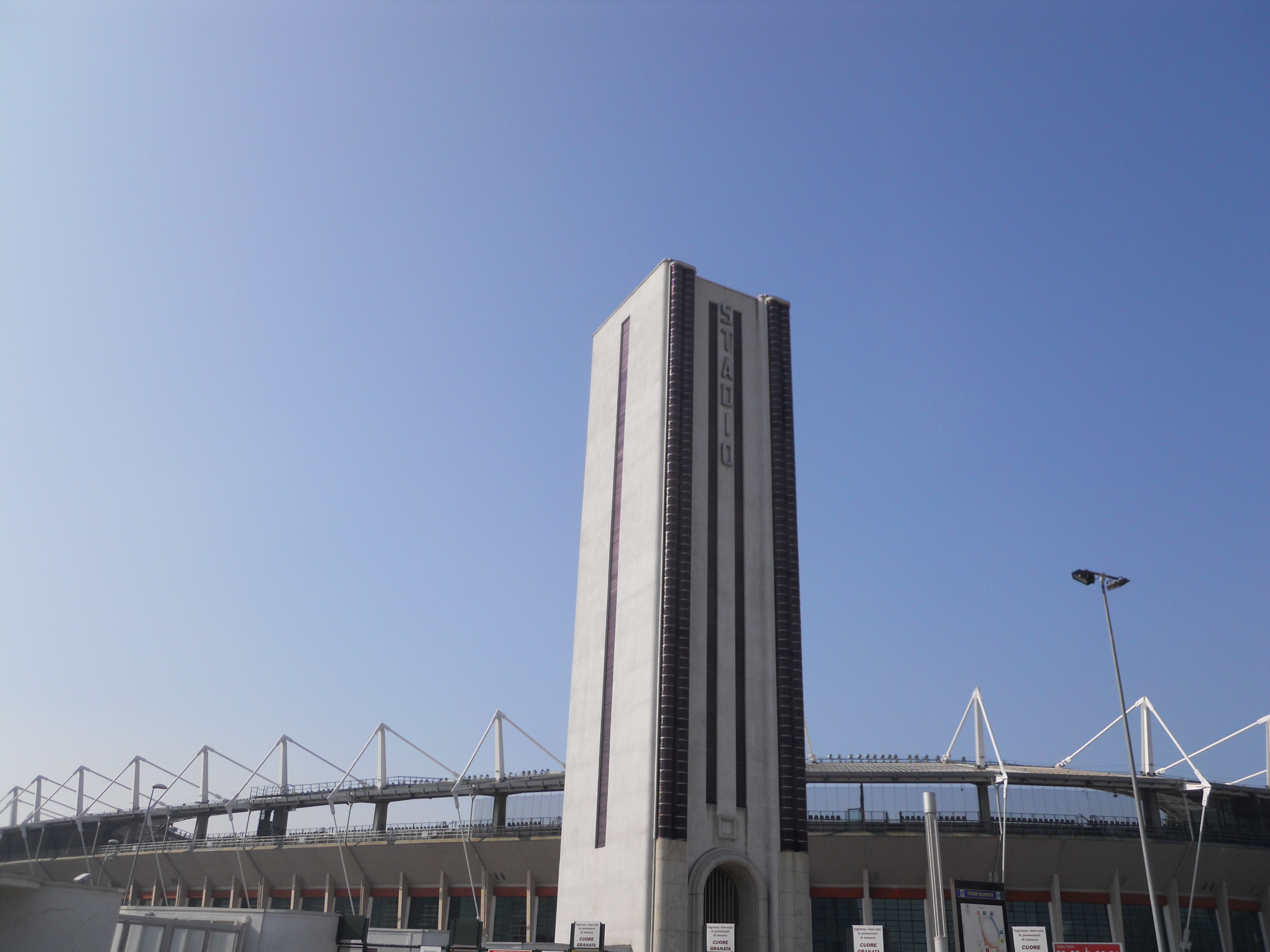
The Torre Maratona after the renovations of 2006

This section of the stadium is traditionally occupied by the nuclei of the most enthusiastically organised Torino supporters during home games. This name has been attributed to the presence, since the time of the Municipal Stadium, in the area behind the curve itself, of a high tower. This tower was planned to mark the finished of the Turin Marathon and other street races and events held in the city.

=== Curva Primavera (Curva Sud) ===
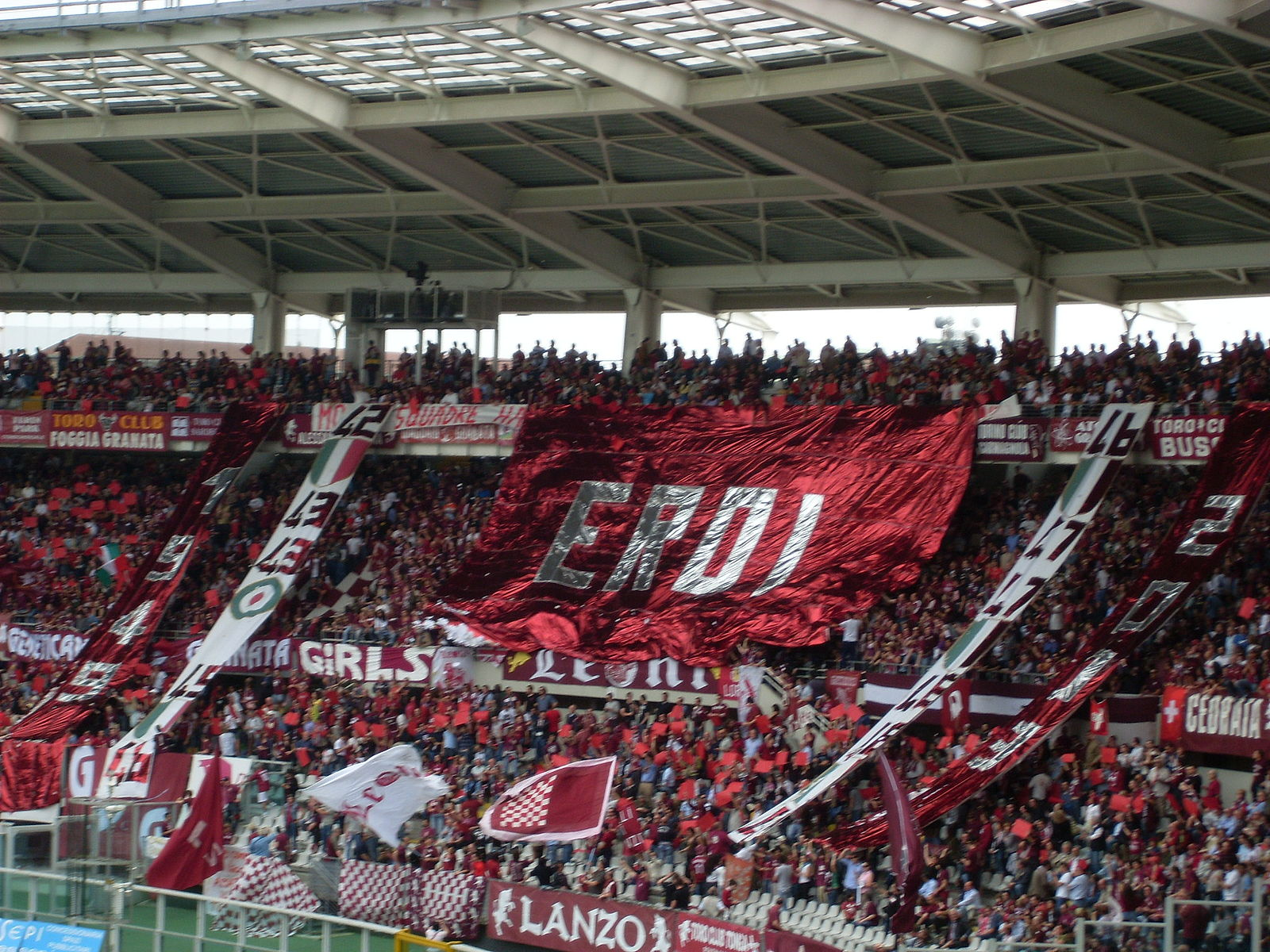
Torino fans in the Curva Primavera

Since reopening the facility after the Winter Olympics in 2006, the south bend was renamed the Curva Primavera in honour of the Torino youth teams. In Italian, this literally translates to "Spring Curve".

=== Distinti Est ===
The Distinguished East (the east area of the stadium) has been the meeting place of families within the facility. On the left side is a separate sector, reserved for fans of visiting teams.

=== Distinti Ovest ===
The Distinguished West was the most expensive stand of the Olympic Stadium. The second level is where is localized the press tribunes and the boxes of the authorities

== Concerts ==
=== When named the Stadio Comunale ===
- Bob Marley & The Wailers – 28 June 1980
- Peter Tosh – 19 July 1980
- Iron Maiden – 2 September 1980
- Dire Straits – 1 July 1981
- Frank Zappa – 2 July 1982
- The Rolling Stones – 11–12 July 1982
- AC/DC – 7 September 1984
- David Bowie – 9 June 1987
- Madonna – 4 September 1987 (for 63,127 people)
- Sting – 3 May 1988
- Michael Jackson – 29 May 1988 (60 000 people)
- Bruce Springsteen & The E Street Band – 11 June 1988 ( 65 000 people)
- Pink Floyd – 6 July 1988
- Amnesty International's Human Rights Now! Benefit Concert – 8 September 1988 (The show was headlined by Bruce Springsteen and the E Street Band and also featured Sting, Peter Gabriel Tracy Chapman, Yossou N'Dour and Claudio Baglioni)
- Tina Turner – 5 May 1990

=== Stadio Olimpico ===
- Bruce Springsteen − 21 July 2009 (for 32,774)
- U2 – 6 August 2010, with Kasabian (for 42,441 people)
- Coldplay – Marina and the Diamonds – Rita Ora – 24 May 2012 (for 39,778 people)
- Muse – 28–29 June 2013 (for 65,228 people)
- One Direction – 6 July 2014 (for 38,430 people)
- Rammstein - 12 July 2022 (for 38,430)

== Other sports ==
On 9 November 2013, it hosted Italy's end-of-year rugby union international against Australia, who won 50–20.

== See also ==
- List of football stadiums in Italy
- Lists of stadiums

Events and tenants
| Preceded by Rice-Eccles Stadium; Salt Lake City | Winter Olympics; Opening and Closing Ceremonies (Olympic Stadium); 2006 | Succeeded by BC Place; Vancouver |
| Preceded by Camp Nou; Barcelona | Inter-Cities Fairs Cup; Final Venue; 1965 | Succeeded by Two legged Final |
