= Giovanni Ramponi =

Italian academic

Giovanni Ramponi (born 28 November 1956) is an Italian professor of electronics at the University of Trieste whose works have been cited more than 1513 times since 2008.
