= Cicarelli =

Cicarelli is an Italian surname. Notable people with the surname include:

- Daniella Cicarelli (born 1978), Brazilian TV show hostess and fashion model
- Fernando Chacarelli (1905–1984), Argentinean runner who competed as Fernando Cicarelli

== See also ==
- Ciccarelli
