= Luisa Accati =

Historian, anthropologist, feminist

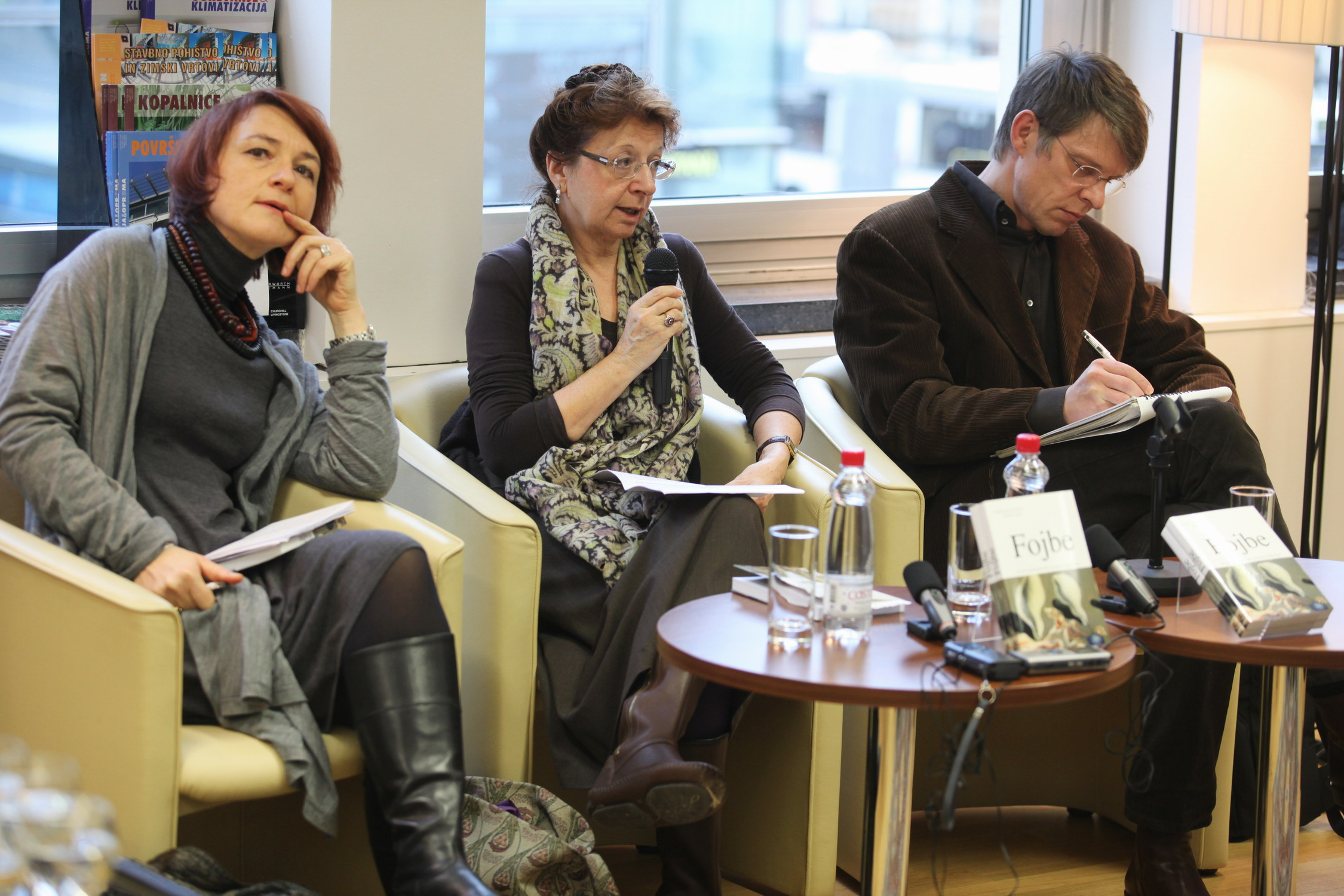
Presentation in Ljubljana, with Marta Verginella, Igor Pribac and Luisa Acatti

Luisa Accati Levi (born in 1942) is an Italian historian, anthropologist and feminist public intellectual. She taught ethnology and modern history at the University of Trieste.

She was born in Turin. After finishing her studies at the University of Turin and in Paris, she turned to the research of the historical anthropology of rural societies in Northern Italy. She has published monographs on the rural religiosity and on witch trials in the region of Friuli, and on family relations in urban and semi-urban communities in 19th century Udine. Her major contributions are in the study of the cult of Mary and its symbolical meaning for understanding the different social and political structures in Catholic and Protestant societies in Europe.

== Major works ==
- The Beauty and the Monster. Discursive and Figurative Representations of the Parental Couple from Giotto to Tiepolo. European Press Academic Publishing, 2006.
- Madri Pervasive e Figli Dominanti ("Pervasive Mothers and Dominant Sons"). European Press Academic Publishing, 2003.
