= Stadio Porta Elisa =

Multi-use stadium in Lucca, Italy

Coordinates: 43°50′52″N 10°31′2″E

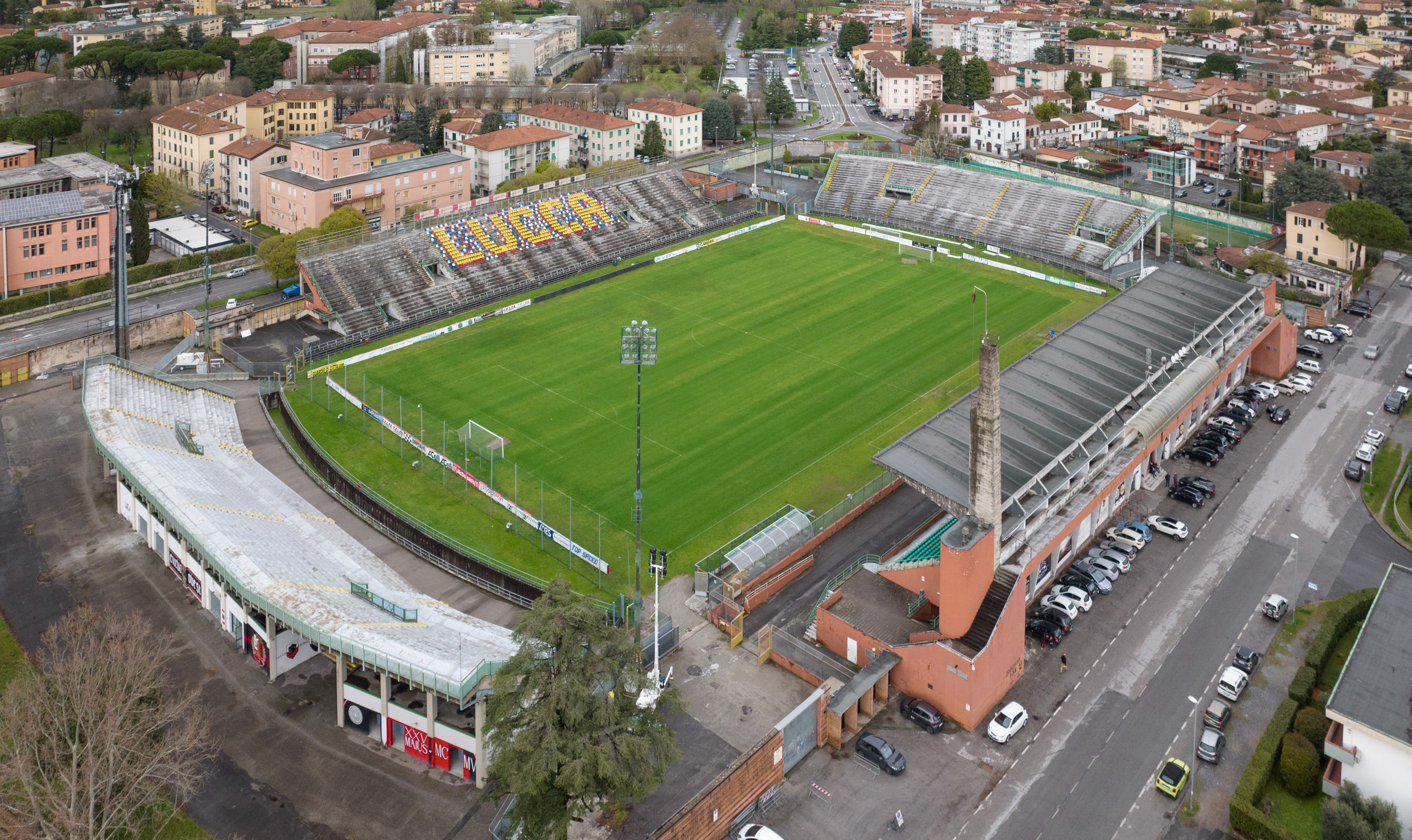
- Interactive map of Stadio Porta Elisa
- Location: Lucca, Italy
- Owner: Municipality of Lucca
- Capacity: 7,386
- Surface: Grass; 105x68m

Construction
- Opened: 1935
- Architects: Raffaello Fagnoni, Enrico Bianchini

Tenant
- A.S. Lucchese

Stadio Porta Elisa is a multi-use stadium in Lucca, Italy. It was built to hold 12,000 people in the 1930s, but safety regulations have made it so that it can only hold around 7,400 people;

== History ==
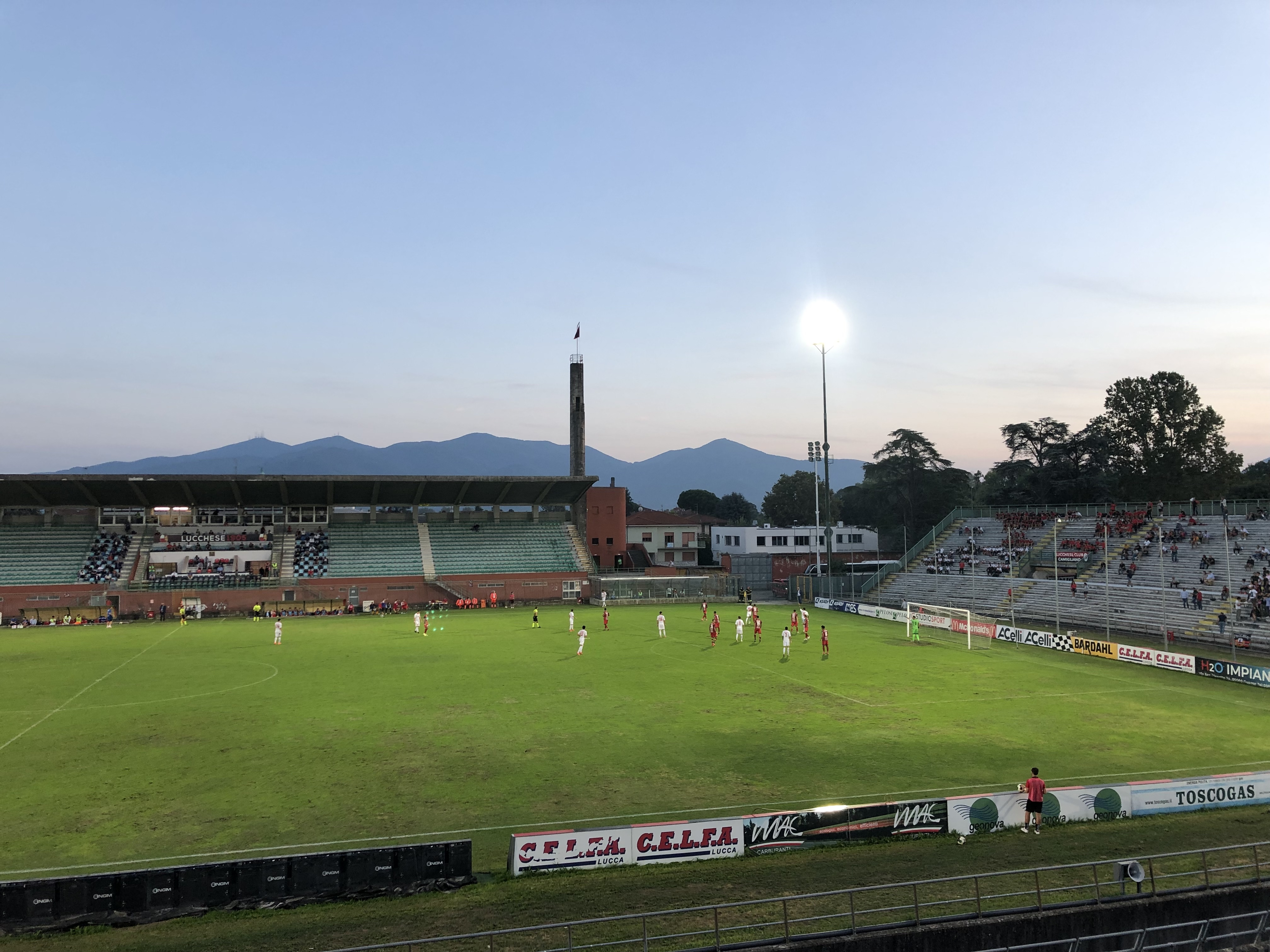
Lucchese (red) vs. Teramo (white) at Stadio Porta Elisa in 2021

The stadium was named after Porta Elisa, a gate in the east of the historic walls of Lucca, named after Elisa Baciocchi Bonaparte.

It is currently used mostly for football matches and is the home ground of A.S. Lucchese-Libertas.
