= Orto Botanico dell'Università di Trieste =

Botanical garden in Italy

Coordinates: 45°41′40″N 13°44′50″E

The Orto Botanico dell'Università di Trieste is a 4.2 hectare nature preserve and botanical garden operated by the University of Trieste in the Friuli-Venezia Giulia region of Italy.

The garden was established in 1963 on the grounds of Villa Valerio, a chocolate baron's former estate, shortly after it became university property. In 1968 two small greenhouses were added. The garden's most recent catalog was published in 1990; since then the garden has not been fully maintained.

At present, about 1 hectare is planted with specimens including Aesculus hippocastanum, Laurus nobilis, Prunus avium, and Sambucus nigra, as well as Helleborus, Polypodium, Seseli, and Valeriana. The remaining area is kept in a natural state; species include Carpinus orientalis, Centaurea forojuliensis, Pinus nigra, Quercus petraea, Quercus pubescens, as well as Dianthus tergestinus, Euphorbia characias wulfenii, Potentilla tommasiniana, Ruscus aculeatus, etc. One greenhouse contains a collection of about 80 species of succulent plants including Aizoaceae, Cactaceae, Crassulaceae, and Euphorbiaceae; the other is devoted to species of temperate climates.

== See also ==
- List of botanical gardens in Italy
