= Alfonso Stocchetti =

Italian architect

- Born: 1 September 1920; Ercolano, Province of Naples, Kingdom of Italy
- Died: 4 June 2004 (aged 83); Florence, Italy
- Education: University of Naples
- Occupation: Architect

Alfonso Stocchetti (1 September 1920 – 4 June 2004) was an Italian architect.

== Life and career ==
Stocchetti graduated in architecture from the University of Naples in 1946. After a brief experience at the Superintendence of Monuments in Ravenna (1946–1949), he moved to Florence, where he became an assistant to Raffaello Fagnoni at the chair of building layout and distribution of the University of Florence (1949). Together with Fagnoni, he participated in some notable projects, such as the new basilica of Montecatini Terme (1953–1958), alongside Pierluigi Spadolini and Mario Negri; the obstetric-gynecological clinic of the Careggi Hospital in Florence (1957–1961); and the residential district La Rosa in Livorno (1959–1961), with Spadolini and Enrico Cambi.

In the 1950s and 1960s, Stocchetti designed several churches in Tuscany: Sacro Cuore in Casini, Quarrata (1954–1957); San Martino in Avane near Cavriglia (1955), demolished after a few years to make way for the Santa Barbara Mining Company quarry; the parish complex of the Immaculate Virgin Mary in Ginestra Fiorentina (1955–1958); the parish church of San Pio V in Empoli, in collaboration with architect Father Angelo Polesello (1965–1967); and the complex with a multi-purpose hall, nursery, and church of San Pio X in San Giovanni Valdarno (completed in 1972–1974, with the addition of a bell tower in 1997).

Stocchetti also designed the Anas headquarters in Ancona (1951), the Autogrill in Serravalle Pistoiese (1962), and the fruit and vegetable market in Chioggia (1964), together with Mario Luzzetti. Noteworthy is also Villa Lorenzini, known as the "house on the cliff", in Punta Ala (Grosseto), built between 1962 and 1965.

Following Fagnoni's death in 1966, Stocchetti was appointed director of the Institute and the teaching of building layout and distribution, which in 1969 was renamed Social Architecture. In this role, he promoted various studies on building typologies, also in collaboration with the National Research Council, which resulted in the publication of the Quaderni dell'Istituto as well as a series of volumes.

Starting in the 1970s, he dedicated himself to the study and design of hospital buildings, collaborating on the projects of the Provincial Psychiatric Institutes of Grosseto (1970), the Bernabeo Hospital in Ortona (1980), and the Alfa Columbus complex in Lastra a Signa (1988-1994).

== Sources ==
- Ghelli, Cecilia (2007). "Alfonso Stocchetti". In Elisabetta Insabato; Cecilia Ghelli (eds.). Guida agli archivi di architetti e ingegneri del Novecento in Toscana. Florence: Edifir. pp. 351–355.
- Giuseppe Luigi Marini, ed. (1966). Catalogo Bolaffi dell'architettura italiana 1963-1966. Turin. pp. 548–549.
- Macci, Loris (1967). "Casa a Punta Ala". L'architettura. Cronache e storia (146): 506–511.
- Franco Magnani, ed. (1971). Ville al mare. Milan: Görlich Editore. pp. 57–61.
- Rossi Prodi, Fabrizio (2003). Carattere dell'architettura toscana. Rome: Officina.
