= Clara Lovett =

American historian

Clara M. Lovett is an American educator and the former president of Northern Arizona University.

== Early life and education ==
Born in Trieste, Italy, Lovett attended the University of Trieste in Italy and Cambridge University in the United Kingdom. Lovett moved to the United States in 1962 and received master’s and doctoral degrees from the University of Texas, Austin.

== Career ==
Lovett was a faculty member at Baruch College and the Graduate Center of the City University of New York. Other educational positions included dean of arts and sciences at The George Washington University, provost at George Mason University, and various positions at the University of Colorado, Cal State and CUNY. She was the Founding Trustee for Western Governors University (WGU).

Lovett appeared on the list of "100 Most Powerful Women" published by Washingtonian Magazine in 1989. In 1992 she received the "Virginia Educator of the Year" award. In 1993 she became president of Northern Arizona University (NAU) in Flagstaff and retired in 2001. After leaving NAU, Lovett was president and Chief Executive Officier (CEO) of the American Association for Higher Education until 2005. That year, she received the "Distinguished Contributions to Higher Education" award from the American College Personnel Association. In 2008, she received the Jeanne Lind Herberger Award from the Arizona Women’s Education & Employment association. Lovett is Chair of the Board of Directors for the Scottsdale Center for the Performing Arts.

== Publications ==
- (1972) Carlo Cattaneo and the politics of the Risorgimento : 1820-1860
- (1979) Giuseppe Ferrari and the Italian Revolution
- (1980) Women, War, and Revolution (co-author)
- (1982) The Democratic Movement in Italy, 1830-1876
- (1983) Carl Schurz, 1829-1906 : a biographical essay and a selective list of reading materials in English
- (1983) Giuseppe Garibaldi,1807-1882 : a bibliographical essay and a selective list of reading materials
- (1984) Vitality without mobility : the faculty opportunities audit
- (1985) Contemporary Italy : a selective bibliography
- (1986) Library of Congress Resources for Research on Relation Between Tuscany and the United States in the Eighteenth Century
- (1993) Listening to the Academic Grapevine, AAHE Bulletin
- (2002) The Dumbing Down of College Presidents, Chronicle of Higher Education
- (2003) Focusing on What Matters, The Magazine of Higher Learning, pp. 33–38
- (2010) American Business Schools in the Post-American World, Chronicle of Higher Education
- (2011) Trusteeship, November/December, Number: 6, Volume:19

== Personal life ==
Lovett and her husband founded the B&L Charitable Foundation. She returned to the DC area in fall 2011 and established residence in Maryland in 2012.
