= Marko Kravos =

Slovene poet, writer, essayist and translator

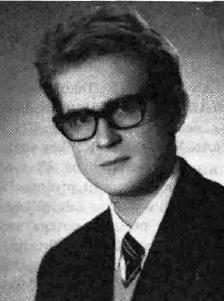
- Marko Kravos
- Born: 16 May 1943 (age 83); Montecalvo Irpino, Italy
- Occupations: Poet, writer, translator
- Writing career
- Notable works: Trinajst, Tretje oko, Jazonova sled
- Notable awards: Prešeren Foundation Award; 1982 for his poetry collection Tretje oko Astrolabio d'oro 2000 for poetry

Marko Kravos (born 16 May 1943) is a Slovene poet, writer, essayist and translator from Trieste, Italy.

He was born in Montecalvo Irpino, a small village in the Southern Italian region of Irpinia, where his family was sent to confination by the Italian Fascist regime. He spent his childhood in Trieste, where he attended Slovene language schools. After graduating in Slavic philology at the University of Ljubljana in 1969, in Slovenia (then part of Yugoslavia), he worked in several publishing houses in Trieste. He also worked as a Slovene language professor at the University of Trieste. Between 1996 and 2000, he served as president of the Slovenian section of the International P.E.N.

Kravos writes poetry, essays and children's literature, as well as screenplays for radio. He is most renowned for his lyrical poems, which have been translated into 17 languages. His most famous poem is "Jason's Trace" (Jazonova sled).

Kravos also translates from Italian, Croatian and Spanish to Slovene. He translated works by Scipio Slataper, Elio Vittorini and Octavio Paz.

== Awards ==
- 1982 Prešeren Foundation Award for his poetry collection Tretje oko
- 2000 Astrolabio d'oro award for poetry

== Notable works ==
=== Poetry ===
- Trinajst, 1966
- Pesem, 1969
- Trikotno jadro, 1972
- Obute in bose, 1976
- Paralele, 1977
- Tretje oko, 1979
- Napisi in nadpisi, 1984
- V znamenju škržata, 1985
- Sredozemlje, 1987
- Ko so nageljni dišali, 1988
- Obzorje in sled, 1992
- Sredi zemlje Sredozemlje, 1993
- Il richiamo del cucolo – Kukavičji klic, 1994
- Krompir na srcu, 1996
- Vreme za pesna – Vreme za pesem, 1998
- Jazonova sled – Le tracce di Giasone – Jazonov trag, 2000
- Sui due piedi, 2001
- Potrkaj na žaro, 2001
- Med repom in glavo, 2008

=== Prose ===
==== Prose for adults ====
- Kratki časi – Trst iz žabje perspektive, 1999
- U kratkim hlačicama, 2002

==== Prose for children ====
- Tri pravljice: ena sladka, ena rahla, ena skoraj modra, 1991
- Začarani grad, 1993
- Male zgodbe iz velikega življenja Bineta Brrvinca, 1994
- Ko je zemlja še rasla, (1996)
- Hudič iz kravjega jajca in druge mastne zgodbe, 1996
- Zlati rog, 2002
- Škrat Škrip Škrap nagaja rad, (200
- Podkovani zajec in modra oslica, 2005
- Trst v žepu: pogled na zgodovino od popka dol, 2006
- Ta prave od pet do glave, 2010

==== Translations ====
- Zlati slanik – L'aringa d'oro, 1974
- Baside – Besede, 1985
- Petrica Kerempuh, 1985
- Moj Kras, 1988
- Zimska pravljica, 1990
- Per certi versi – Po drugi strani, 1995
- V tem strašnem času, 1995
- La peicia, 1996
- Moja vojna, 2001
- Libertades minimas – Prostodušne malenkosti, 2003
- Dis ale sole e di altre parole – Iz soli in sonca in drugih besed; la nuova generazione in poesia a Trieste: nova generacija v tržaški poeziji, 2004
- Plastične pregrade, kljubovalno cvetličenje – Sintetiche siepi, ostinate inflorazioni, 2007
