= Demetrio Volcic =

Italian politician (1931–2021)

Demetrio Volcic MEP
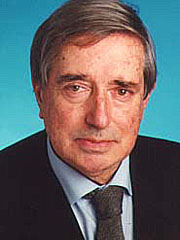
- Demetrio Volcic

Member of the European Parliament
- In office 1999–2004
- Parliamentary group: Party of European Socialists
- Constituency: North-East Italy (European Parliament constituency)

Personal details
- Born: Dimitrij Volčič; 22 November 1931 Ljubliana, Yugoslavia
- Died: 5 December 2021 (aged 90) Gorizia, Italy
- Citizenship: Italian
- Education: University of Trieste
- Profession: Journalist

Demetrio Volcic (22 November 1931 – 5 December 2021), also known in Slovene as Dimitrij Volčič, was an Italian journalist, author, and politician of Slovenian descent. He rose to prominence in the late 1960s and early 1970s as foreign correspondent for the Italian television RAI. In the late 1990s, he served as member of the Italian Senate, and later as Member of European Parliament for the European Socialist Party.

== Early life and journalist career ==
He was born Dimitrij Volčič in Ljubljana, Yugoslavia (now the capital of Slovenia) and nicknamed "Mitja". His parents were Slovene political immigrants from the Italian-administered Julian March who had moved to Yugoslavia in order to avoid the repressive policies of Fascist Italianization. Despite coming from a Roman Catholic background, his parents sent him to a Serbian Orthodox elementary school in Ljubljana. After the end of World War II, his parents moved back to Trieste, where Dimitrij finished a Slovene language high school. He studied economy at the University of Trieste.

Already in his student years, he became involved in journalism. In 1956, he moved to Rome, where he worked for the Italian national broadcast RAI. Due to his knowledge of Slavic languages and interest in Eastern Europe, he was sent as a reporter to the Communist bloc. He worked as a foreign correspondent in Prague, Vienna, Moscow, Bonn, Warsaw and finally again Moscow. He also wrote for several Italian journals, including La Stampa and La Repubblica. He wrote regular columns for the Primorski dnevnik, the Slovene language daily newspaper of Trieste. Between 1993 and 1994, he served as director of TG1, at the time the most watched news program in Italy. Between 1994 and 1996, he taught political sciences at the University of Trieste. In 1995, he received the prize "Archivio Disarmo - Golden Doves for Peace" from IRIAD.

== Political career ==
Volcic entered politics in 1997, when he successfully ran for by-election to the Italian Senate after the death of the senator Darko Bratina. He ran as an independent candidate with the support of the Democratic Party of the Left. In 1999, he was elected to the European Parliament on the list of the Democrats of the Left. As an MEP, between 1999 and 2002 he was vice-chair of the delegation to the EU-Slovenia Joint Parliamentary Committee, and from 2002 to 2004 he has vice-chair of the delegation to the EU-Armenia, EU-Azerbaijan and EU-Georgia Parliamentary Cooperation Committees. He was also a member of the committee on regional policy, transport and tourism from 1999 to 2002, and of the committee on foreign affairs, human rights, common security and defence policy from 2002 to 2004.
