= Aliguccio Ciccarelli =

Italian painter

Aliguccio Ciccarelli is another name for the Italian artist Olivuccio di Ciccarello, also known as Ciccarello d'Aliguzio (15th century) is a painter of the 15th century, allegedly active in Loreto, Camerino, and Ancona. Little biographical details are known and his identity is difficult to assign with any certainty to any work. Corrado Ferretti cites a notes by Amico Ricci and Giuseppe Vogel who saw a contemporary document by the lawyer from Recanati, Ser Giacomo di Maestro Pietruccio, about a painter (1429) in the Basilica in Loreto.

Vogel's documents that the procurator of Filippo Maria Visconti, Duke of Milan, a man named Giovanni de Carnago, commissioned from Aliguccio a painting of the Adoration of the Magi to hang in pertinentiis in the Basilica della Santa Casa in Loreto. Ricci's document stated similar commission for the price of 50 gold florins.
