= Antonio Kim Ciccarelli =

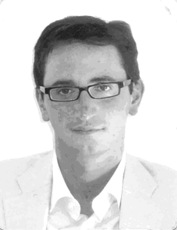
- Antonio Kim Ciccarelli
- Born: 23 February 1974 (age 52); Naples
- Occupations: Economist, businessman, author

Antonio Kim Ciccarelli (Naples 23 February 1974), is an economist and Italian businessman. He is currently professor of worldwide economy at the University of Trieste (Italy).

== Education and business career ==
He is a member of the Ciccarelli family, an influential Italian family with financial interests in many fields. Ciccarelli studied law and economy in Italy, the United Kingdom and United States. He was a Graduate in Law at University of Naples Federico II. After graduation Ciccarelli took a major in international law and international tax planning, and in the following years a master's degree at the Carnegie Institute.

He was founder with his brother Nicholas of the Swing Group, an international financial company known primarily as a venture capital company. It is involved in various fields such as tourism, hotels and resorts, information technology, consultancy services, e-commerce, and construction and development of malls and commercial centers. Headquartered in Naples, it is a multinational conglomerate with offices in Italy, England, Scotland, Brazil, Argentina, China, and India.

In 2008 Ciccarelli was named president and CEO of Carso Center for Advanced Research in Space Optics, a European laboratory that performs research and development in the field of advanced optical instrumentation and components for space applications, with participation in scientific missions in the space, in cooperation above all with the European Space Agency, NASA, and other space agencies. Carso is partner of the International Alpha Magnetic Spectrometer (AMS) project, an International Space Station particle physics experiment designed to search for and measure, with a much greater sensitivity than heretofore possible, various unusual types of matter and antimatter. AMS will be the first sensitive magnetic spectrometer in space.

Since 2014, he has been CEO of the British group Secret World, which, with over 100 million users per year, is the largest free travel guide in the world. Secret World

== Clubs and memberships ==
He was president of the Rotaract Club, Naples East, for three years. He is a member of the Round Table Club and has held many positions, including member of the board for South Italy, and served in charge of International Relations. In 2005 and 2006 He was president of the Club of Naples. He served two years as a member of the board of the young Neapolitan Industrialists of API, the Federation of the Italian small and medium Industries.

Ciccarelli is the founder and president of Malpractice Foundation, a not-for-profit organisation that defends the rights of the victims of medical malpractice. It provides free legal assistance. It is the only Foundation in the world that covers against trial risks.

== Publications ==
He is author of many works, including:

- Sustainable Development and International Law (2000)
- Project Finance in Italy (2001)
- Property Management and Asset Management(2001)
- Innovative Finance (2002)'
- Trust (2002)
- Reit – Real Estate Investment Trust
- Private Equity (2002)
- STU Società di Transformazione Urbana (2005)
- Manual of Finance for Innovation (2008)
- The Dreams in the Economy of the Twentieth Century ( 2008)
- Manuale di Finanza per l'innovazione (2008);
- Dreams and Economy (2009)

== Sources ==
- Televisa National Mexican television interview
- SF Zwei TV (Swiss television Channel) Interview
- MSN
- FusiOrari Magazine Interview
- TantaSalute.it Interview
- La Repubblica
