= Umberto Nordio =

Italian architect (1891–1971)

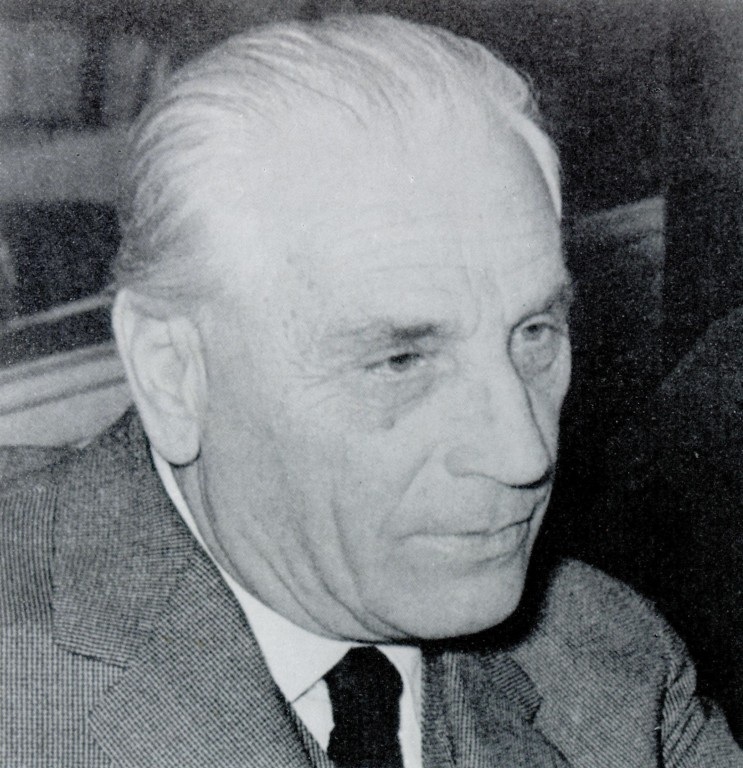
- Born: 7 March 1891; Trieste, Austria-Hungary
- Died: 28 October 1971 (aged 80); Trieste, Italy
- Education: Polytechnic University of Milan
- Occupations: Architect, naval designer

Umberto Nordio (7 March 1891 – 28 October 1971) was an Italian architect and naval designer.

== Life and career ==
Nordio was born in Trieste in 1891, then part of the Austro-Hungarian Empire, to architect Enrico. He studied at the Regio Istituto Tecnico Superiore in Milan (now Polytechnic University), earning his degree in architecture in 1919. An Italian irredentist, he volunteered for the Royal Italian Army during World War I.

After the war, Nordio returned to Trieste, where he took over his father's architectural practice. His early works include the atrium of the National Insurance Institute (1924) and the completion of the monumental Courthouse. Known for his meticulous attention to detail, he approached architecture as an integrated art form, designing everything from structural layouts to decorative elements.

Throughout the 1920s and 1930s, Nordio played a key role in shaping modern Trieste. He was involved in major urban projects such as the Foro Ulpiano area (Oberdan district), and designed important civic buildings including the Casa del Combattente and the Casa del Balilla (later GIL and Palazzo del Lavoro). His style balanced functionalism with refined craftsmanship and respect for context. He frequently collaborated with artists such as Achille Funi, Carlo Sbisà, and Ugo Carà, integrating murals, mosaics, and sculptures into his buildings.

In the late 1930s, Nordio co-designed the new campus of the University of Trieste, a symbolic project representing Italian cultural identity at the eastern border. Despite delays due to World War II, the complex was largely completed after the war, under Allied administration. He also designed the church of the Immaculate Heart of Mary (from 1939 onward), characterized by its vertical campanile and traditional basilica layout, distancing itself from contemporary sacred art debates.

Nordio continued to receive commissions after the fall of fascism. In 1955, he helped establish a state institute for ship and interior decoration, later named after both him and his father. An influential figure in Trieste's architectural scene, he taught at the local university and held national positions, including membership in the National Council of Architects and the Accademia di San Luca.

In the field of naval interiors, Nordio played a significant role—often in collaboration with architects Aldo Cervi, Vittorio Frandoli, and Romano Boico—contributing to the design and furnishing of numerous ocean liners for major international shipping companies, including Società Italia, Lloyd Triestino, Home Lines, and Holland America Line.

He died in 1971 in Trieste and was buried in the city's main cemetery.

== Sources ==
- "Nordio a Trieste. Itinerario n. 43". Domus. No. 702. 1989.
- Contessi, Gianni (1981). Umberto Nordio. Architettura a Trieste, 1926-1943. Milan: FrancoAngeli.
- Panzeri, Miriam (2013). "NORDIO, Umberto". Dizionario Biografico degli Italiani (in Italian). Vol. 78: Natta–Nurra. Rome: Istituto dell'Enciclopedia Italiana. ISBN 978-88-12-00032-6.
