= University of Trieste =

Public university in Trieste, Italy

- Università degli Studi di Trieste
- Latin: Universitas Studiorum Tergestum
- Type: Public
- Established: 1924
- Affiliations: Almalaurea, CEI University Network, Nettuno (accessed 26 February 2014)
- Rector: Prof.ssa Donata Vianelli
- Administrative staff: 1,000
- Students: 15177
- Location: Trieste, Italy; 45.6585°N 13.79318°E
- Campus: Urban
- Sports teams: CUS Trieste
- Website: www.units.it

The University of Trieste (Italian: Università degli Studi di Trieste, or UniTS, Formerly Regia Università degli Studi or The Royal University of Studies) is a public research university in Trieste in the Friuli-Venezia Giulia region in northeast Italy. The university consists of 10 departments, has a wide and almost complete range of university courses and has about 15,000 students and 1,000 professors. It was founded in 1924.

Trieste is the centre of many research facilities, with which the university is connected by cooperation agreements. Among them, there are the International School for Advanced Studies, the International Centre for Theoretical Physics, the National Institute of Oceanography, the International Centre for Genetic Engineering and Biotechnology, the Elettra Sincrotrone Trieste Facility, and the Trieste sections of the Italian National Institute for Nuclear Physics (INFN) and Italian National Institute for Astrophysics (INAF).

Moreover, the number of international inter-university co-operation agreements rapidly increased these last years. These agreements involve staff and student mobility, both within EU Programmes like the Socrates programme and agreements exclusively concerned with research activities.

== History ==
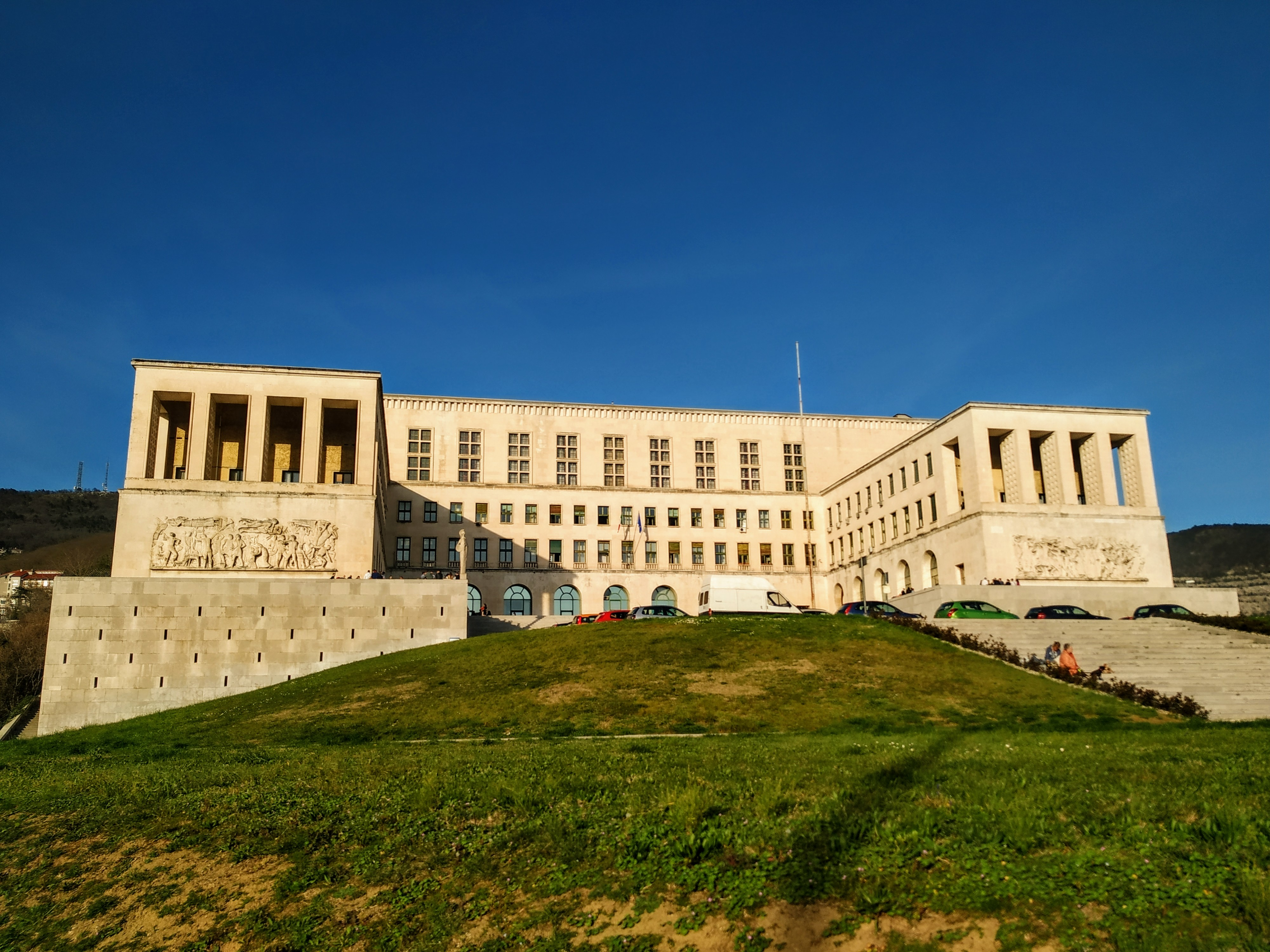
University of Trieste central building on the Scoglietto hill

Before World War I, when Trieste was still a part of the Austro-Hungarian Empire, the Italian-speaking population strongly supported the idea of building a university in the town, but Austrian authorities repeatedly rejected the proposal. After the annexation of Trieste to Italy, the already existing Superior School in Commerce was granted the same rights of similar schools in Italy, and in 1924 it was turned into a university, by king's decree (8 August 1924, n. 1338). In 1938, with the institution of the Law faculty, the second after the Economy and Commerce faculty, the university became a Studium Generale (General Studies) one, and thus was given the title of Regia Università degli Studi (The Royal University of Studies). In the same year, the construction of a new building to house the faculties began on the Scoglietto hill, in a position dominating the Old City. The building, which still hosts the directive board and some faculties, was designed by architects Raffaello Fagnoni and Umberto Nordio. The first stone was posed in a ceremony on 19 September 1938 in the presence of the Italian Prime Minister and other authorities.

World War II slowed down the planned enlargement of the university. Indeed, the faculty of Engineering, although established in 1942, was restricted to naval engineering until the end of the war, while the opening of the faculty of Literature and philosophy, planned in 1943, was postponed till 1945. After the world war, Trieste was put under the joint control of the United Kingdom and the United States of America, in preparation for the establishment of a fully independent State, the Free Territory of Trieste, which nevertheless never came to exist. The Allied Government allowed the foundation of the new Literature and Philosophy faculty, instituted the faculty of Mathematical, Physical and Natural Sciences, and completed the construction of the main building on the Scoglietto hill, inviting an emissary of the Italian government to the inauguration ceremony.

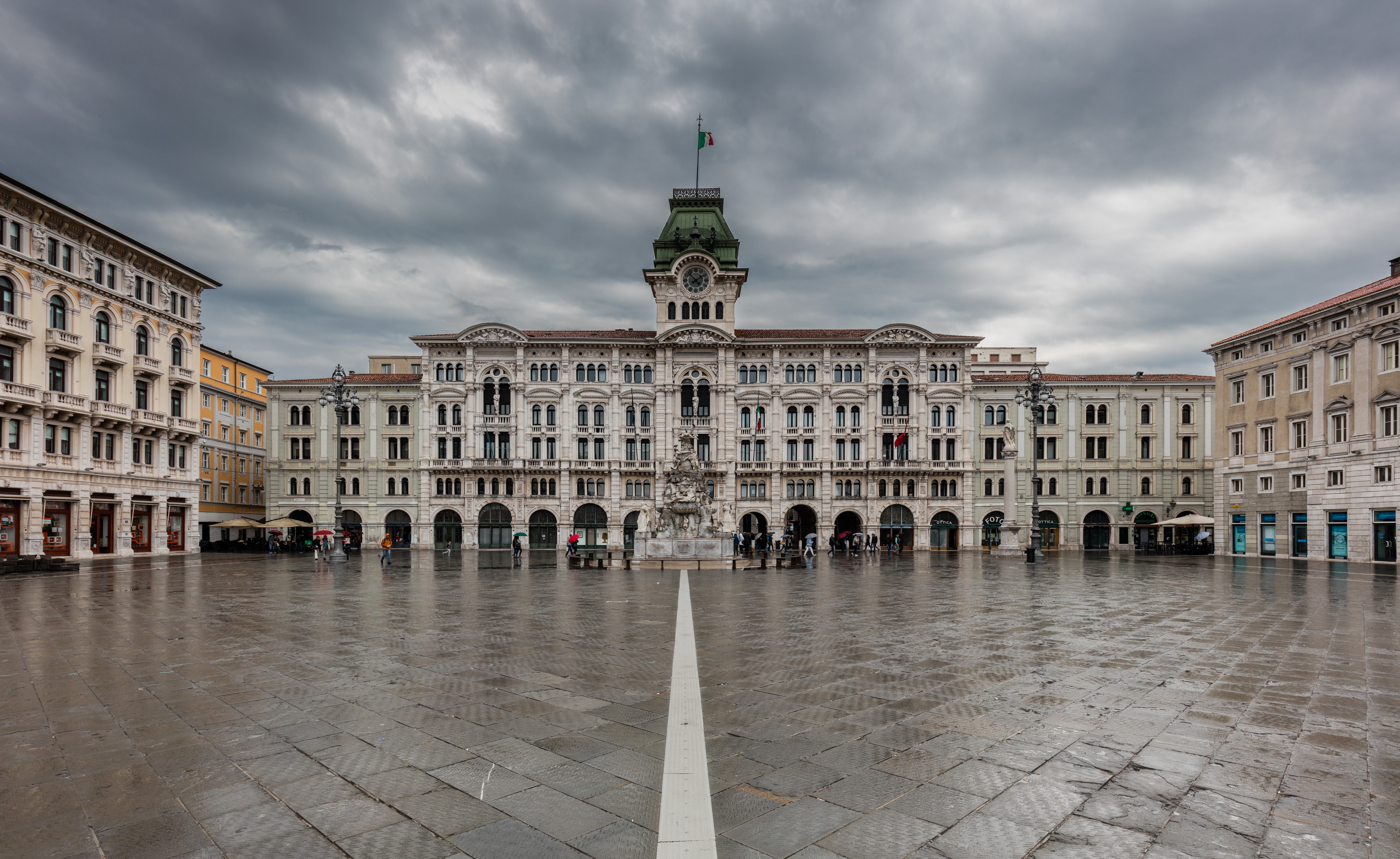
Piazza Unità d'Italia, the centre of students' life in Trieste

In 1954 Trieste was given back to Italy thanks to an agreement between the American and the Italian governments. To celebrate, the university awarded the President of the Italian Republic Luigi Einaudi a honoris causa degree in Economy and Commerce. In a short time new faculties were added (Pharmacy, Teaching Sciences, Medicine and Surgery, Political Sciences), while also new buildings were inaugurated on the Scoglietto hill and in other parts of the town. In 1978 the School of Modern Languages for Interpreters and Translators was given the status of faculty; in 1997 the faculty of Psychology and in 1998 the faculty of Architecture completed the range of faculties currently present at the university.

== Organization ==
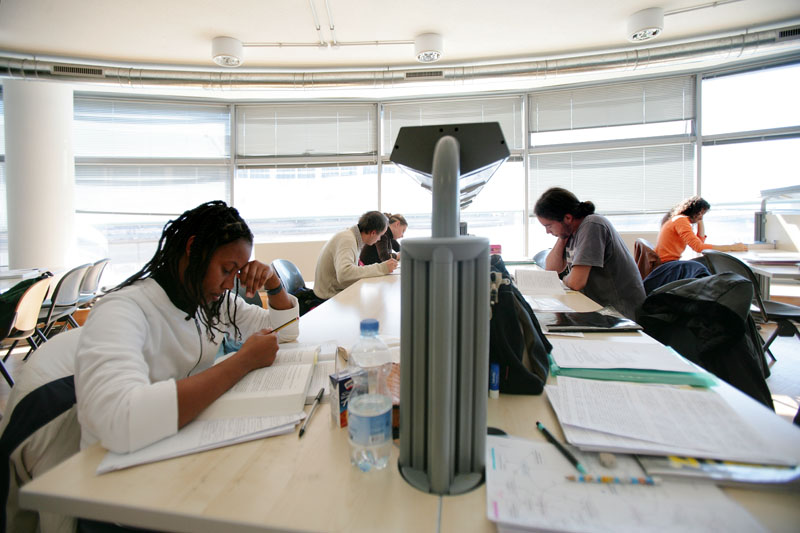
Students studying in the university facilities

These are the 10 departments into which the university is divided on the basis of the major reorganisation of the university's academic structure which took place in 2010:

- Clinical Department of Medical, Surgical and Health Sciences
- Department of Physics
- Department of Engineering and Architecture
- Department of Mathematics and Geosciences
- Department of Chemical and Pharmaceutical Sciences
- Department of Life Sciences
- Department of Economic, Business, Mathematical and Statistical Sciences
- Department of Legal, Language, Interpreting and Translation Studies
- Department of Political and Social Sciences
- Department of Humanities

A Language Centre was established as an independent service on 1 January 2003. The centre provides fundamental support in the following areas: organisation and running of taught language courses in all the Faculties of Trieste University; organisation of Italian courses (beginner, intermediate and advanced level) for Erasmus students both going abroad and coming to Trieste.

== Internationalization ==
Due to its geographical location, the university maintains cross-border cooperation agreements, particularly with institutions in neighboring Slovenia and Croatia. It offers double-degree programs and joint research initiatives within European Union educational frameworks. The university hosts international students, who are supported by the Language Centre for academic and linguistic orientation.

== Structures ==
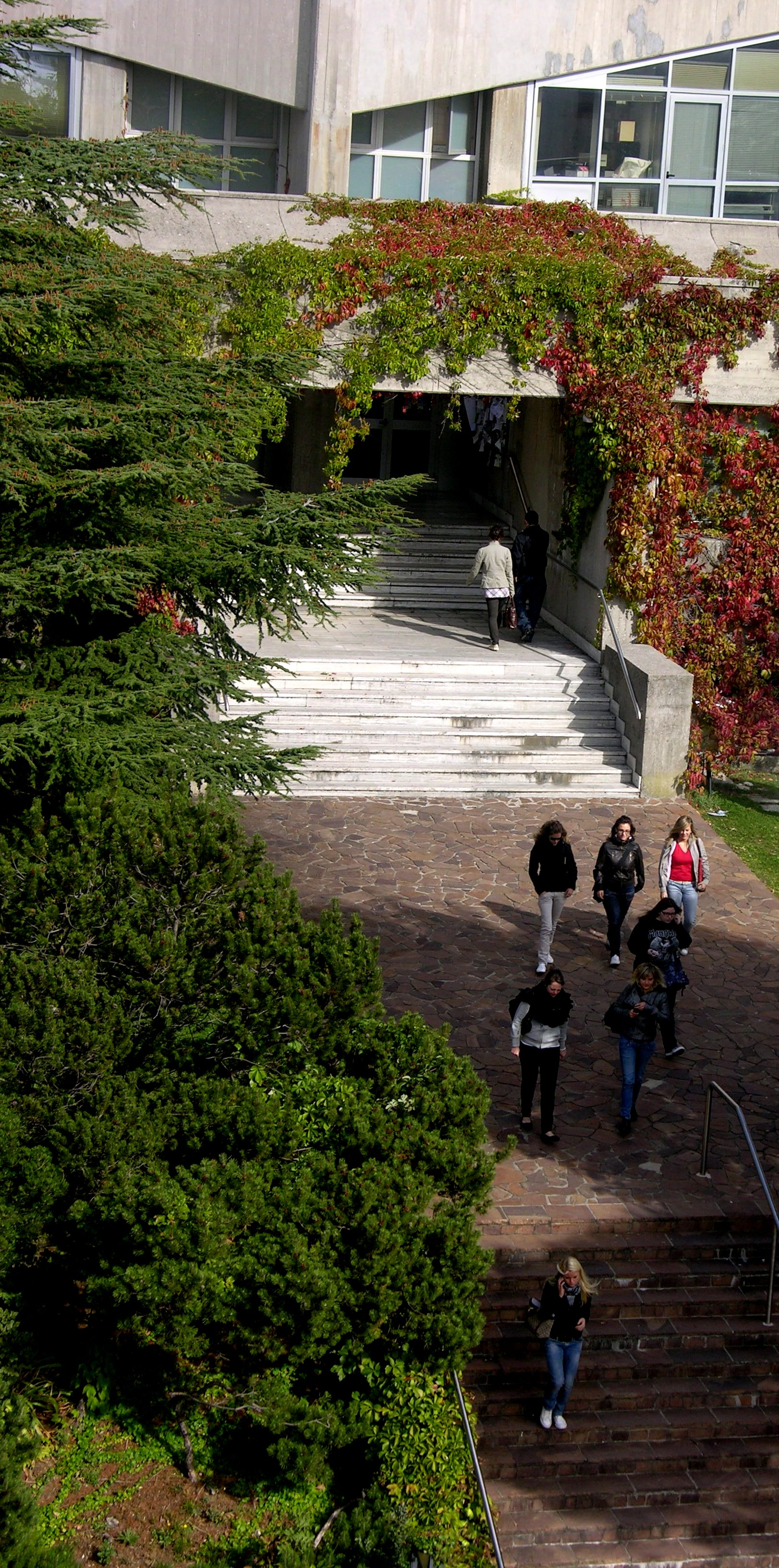
Faculty of Engineering

The main campus is centered on the building in Piazzale Europa, on the Scoglietto hill, housing the Rector's office, the Administration offices, the Main Library and the faculties of Law and Political Sciences. Other buildings in the campus host the faculties of Economics, Pharmacy, Mathematical, Physical and Natural Sciences, Engineering, the Medical Institutes of Microbiology and Physiology, the towing tank, the Data Processing Centre, the Department of Chemical Sciences and the Department of Biochemistry, Biophysics and Macromolecular Chemistry. Within the premises are also sited the university canteen and three university dorms, run by the ARDISS - Agenzia Regionale per il Diritto agli Studi Superiori (Regional Agency for the Right to Higher Education).

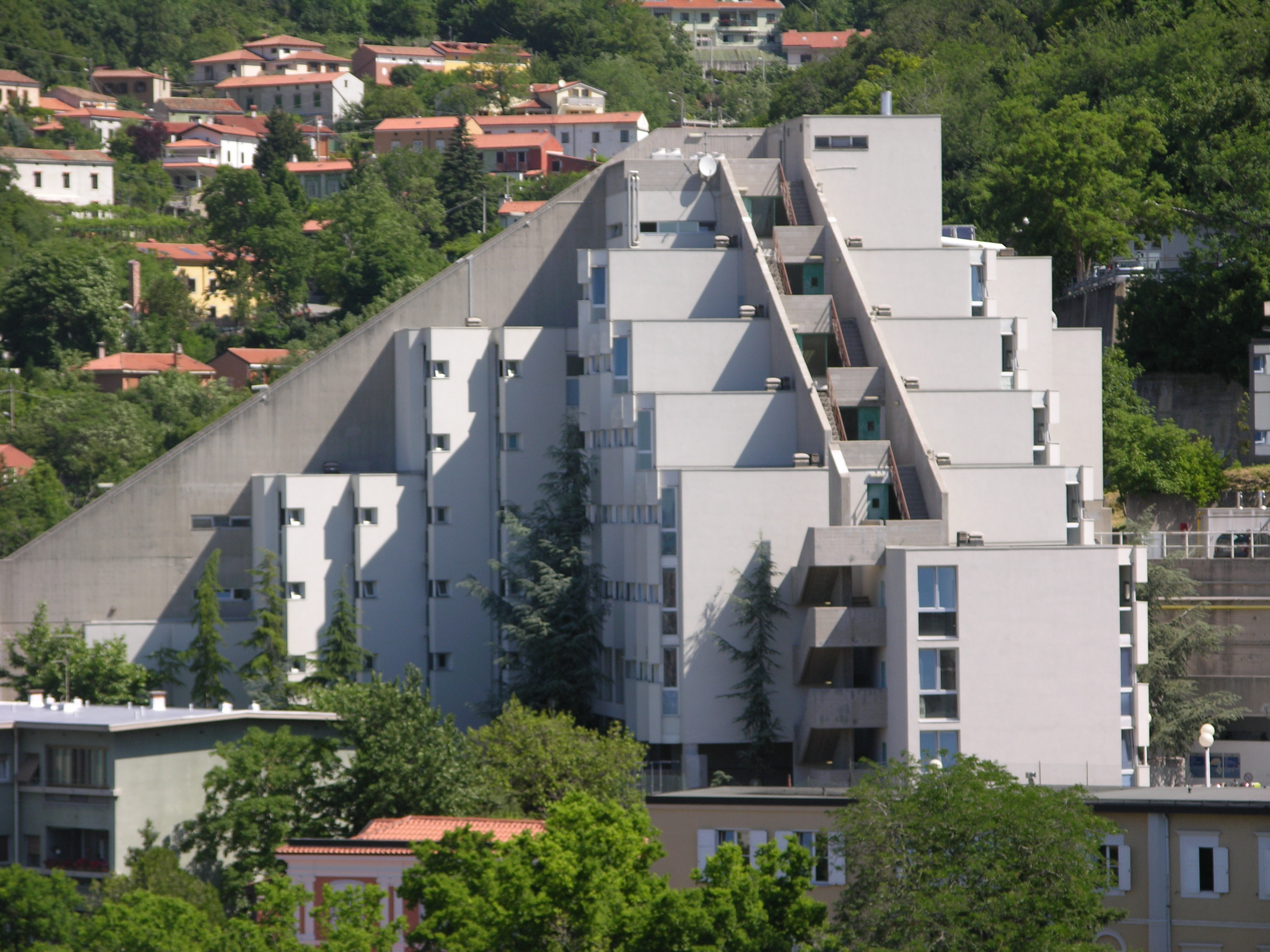
Students' house of the University of Trieste

Other departments are located in different parts of the town. The Department of Geological Sciences and the Department of Earth Sciences are accommodated in the buildings of the former psychiatric hospital, not far away from the main campus, inside San Giovanni Park.

In the heart of the city near the seafront, the old buildings of Via dell'Università and Via del Lazzaretto vecchio house the Department of Humanities, while the Narodni Dom* houses the Section of Studies in Modern Languages for Interpreting and Translation, the first advanced school of for interpreters and translators in Italy. *Restitution to the Slovenian community of Trieste in 2020.

== Library system ==
The university's library network, known as the Sistema Bibliotecario di Ateneo (SBA), comprises several specialized libraries distributed across the campuses. It holds a collection of over 1 million volumes, including historical archives and subscriptions to scientific journals. The network maintains specific archival funds related to the history of science and the multicultural heritage of the Trieste region.

University rankings

Global – Overall
- QS World: 751-760 (2026)

The Faculty of Medicine and Surgery is located in several university compounds, particularly in structures annexed to the three town hospitals: Cattinara, Trieste General Hospital (Ospedale Maggiore), and Burlo Garofolo.

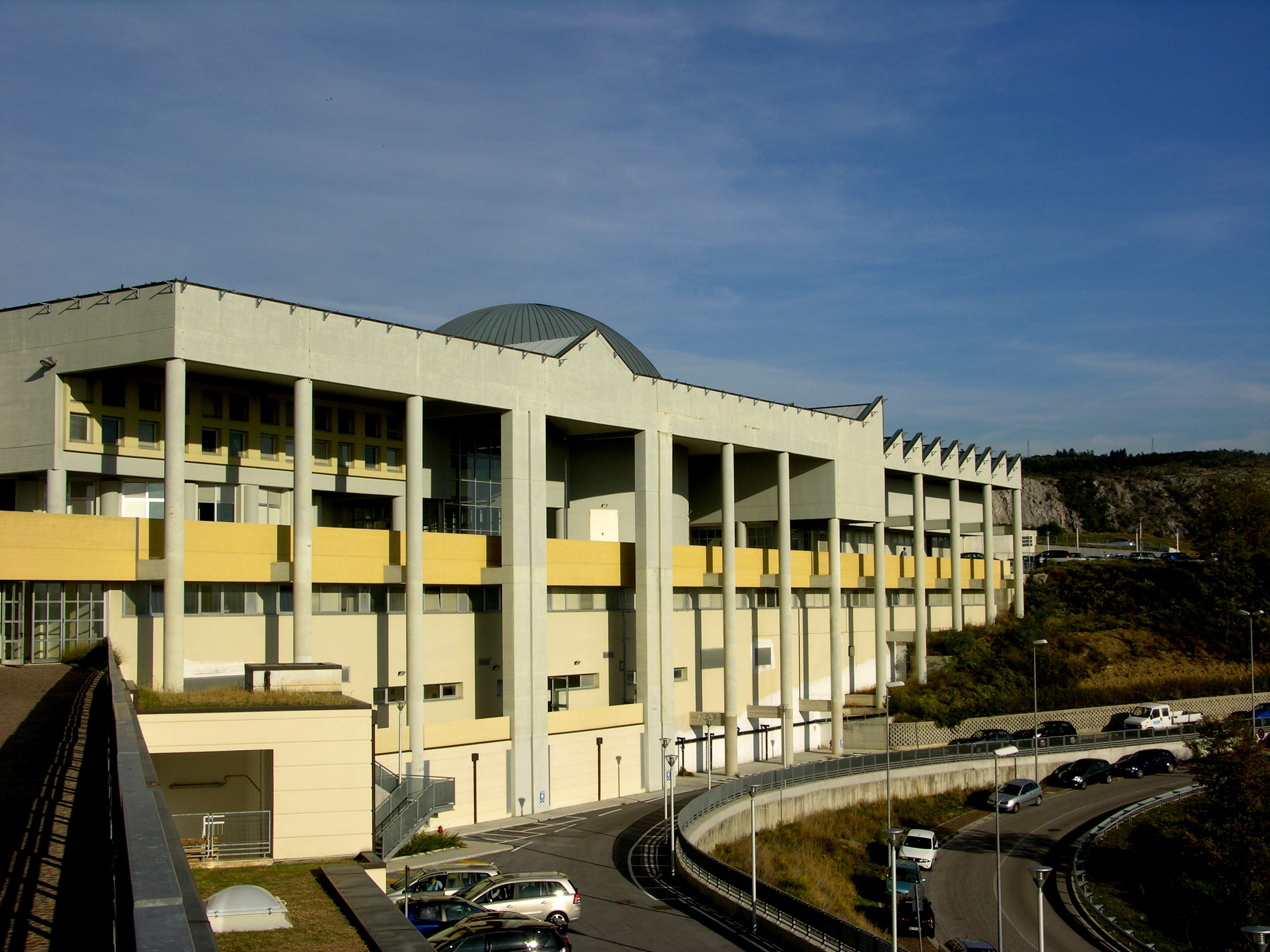
Faculty of Medicine and Surgery

Far from the city centre, near the ICTP (International Centre for Theoretical Physics) there is the Department of Theoretical Physics, in the village of Miramare-Grignano, while the Department of Astronomy is housed near Trieste's two Astronomical Observatories: on San Vito hill and on the karst plateau, in Basovizza.

A few faculties are not in Trieste, but in other cities of the Friuli-Venezia Giulia region and in the neighboring Veneto region. Particularly, in the Pordenone campus, there are undergraduate and graduate programs in Engineering and Education, while the Gorizia campus offers undergraduate and graduate degree programs in International and Diplomatic Studies (part of the Faculty of Political Sciences) and three first-level degree: Business communication and human resource management, Economics and tourism management, Territorial policy. Finally, the Portogruaro campus in the Veneto region hosts the Teaching Sciences Department.

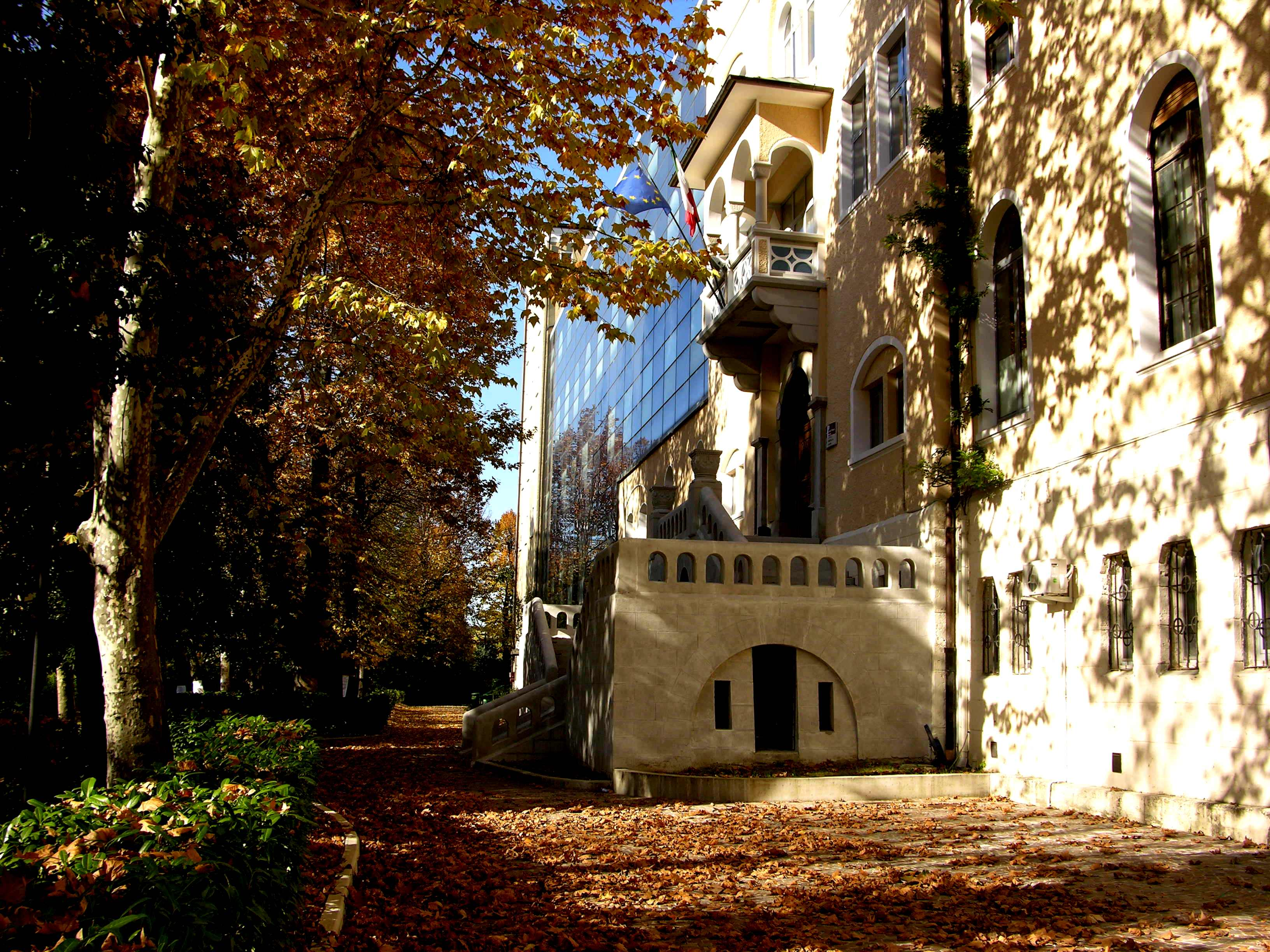
Gorizia campus

== Research and innovation ==
The university operates several internal research facilities, including the Centre of Molecular Biomedicine (CBM), which focuses on genetics, molecular biology, and biotechnology. The Department of Life Sciences conducts research in marine biology and oceanography, utilizing Trieste's coastal location for Mediterranean ecosystem studies. The institution participates in Horizon Europe frameworks for cross-border scientific projects.

== Trieste System ==
In 2020, Trieste was declared as the European City of Science and hosted the EuroScience Open Forum, the most important European event dedicated to science, technology, society and policy. Trieste International Foundation (TIF) is the promoter of Trieste System which is worldwide known as the 'United Nations System of Sciences'. Following international institutes located or headquartered in Trieste maintains collaborations, research and academic affiliations with the University of Trieste and offers programmes at different level from undergraduate to doctorate.

- Abdus Salam International Centre for Theoretical Physics (ICTP), Trieste
- International School for Advanced Studies (SISSA), Trieste
- AREA Science Park, Trieste
- International Centre for Genetic Engineering and Biotechnology (ICGEB), Trieste
- The World Academy of Sciences (TWAS), Trieste, Italy
- Science Center Scientific Imaginary Trieste
- International Center for Science and High Technology (ICS) of UNIDO in Trieste
- Elettra Sincrotrone Trieste, specialized in generating high quality synchrotron and free-electron laser light
- InterAcademy Panel on International Issues (IAP), transferred from the Royal Society of London, UK to TWAS in Trieste
- InterAcademy Medical Panel (IAMP), transferred from Washington, U.S. to TWAS in Trieste
- G77 Consortium on Science, Technology and Innovation for the South (COSTIS) in Trieste
- Astronomical Observatory of Trieste (INAF)
- National Institute of Oceanography and Experimental Geophysics, Trieste
- National Institute of Nuclear Physics (INFN), Trieste
- Centre of Molecular Biomedicine (CBM) of the University of Trieste
- MIB School of Management Trieste

== Campus ==
- San Giovanni Teaching Hub
- Department of Medical, Surgical and Health Sciences
- Gorizia
- Pordenone: Since 1991, an additional satellite site has been established in Pordenone (located at Via Prasecco 4/1). At this site, the university offers degree courses in Production Engineering and Management, which are part of the Department of Engineering and Architecture's curriculum.
- Portogruaro, in the Province of Venice: In 1997, the University expanded its presence by creating a satellite site in Portogruaro, located in the Province of Venice. This site offers degree programs in Education.
- Orto Botanico dell'Università di Trieste (Botanical Garden of the University of Trieste): is maintained by University of Trieste. Founded in 1963, the Botanical Garden of the University of Trieste has an extension of about 2 square kilo meters plus two more woods on Mount Valerio.

== Points of interest ==
- Orto Botanico dell'Università di Trieste, a botanical garden
- Radioincorso.it, a university web radio

== Notable people ==
=== Notable faculty ===
- Luisa Accati, Sociology
- Stefano Bartolini, Political Science
- Václav Bělohradský, Philosophy
- Darko Bratina, Sociology
- Antonio Kim Ciccarelli, Economics
- Eugenio Colorni, Philosophy
- Gillo Dorfles, Humanities
- Augusto del Noce, Philosophy
- Margherita Hack, Astrophysics
- Elvio Guagnini, Italian literature
- Gaetano Kanizsa, Psychology
- Marko Kravos, Slovene language
- Claudio Magris, German literature
- Pier Luigi Nimis, Botany
- Jože Pirjevec, History
- Giovanni Ramponi, Electronics
- Dario Stevanato, Tax Law
- Giacomo Todeschini, History

=== Notable alumni ===
- Giovanni Bossi, former CEO, Banca IFIS
- Marino Busdachin, Secretary-General, Unrepresented Nations and Peoples Organization
- Alberto Conti, mathematician
- Luciano Fonda, physicist
- Salvatore Farina, General, Chief of Army Staff, Commander, Allied Joint Force Command Brunssum
- Roberto Fico, President, Italian Chamber of Deputies
- Dario Floreano, computer scientist
- Antonio Giordano, physician
- Albert O. Hirschman, economist
- Andrea Illy, entrepreneur
- Dušan Jelinčič, journalist and novelist
- Clara Lovett, President (1993-2001), Northern Arizona University
- Lelio Luttazzi, jazz pianist
- Fabio Mini, General (Ret'd) Army, author, columnist
- Stefano Patuanelli, politician, Minister of Economic development
- Carlo Pelanda, economist
- Jože Pirjevec, historian
- Alenka Rebula Tuta, poet and author
- Ermin Smrekar, architect
- Marta Verginella, historian
- Luca Visentini, Secretary-General, European Trade Union Confederation (ETUC)
- Demetrio Volcic, journalist
- Lamberto Zannier, diplomat
- Nicola Marzari, Cavendish Professor of Physics

== Publications ==
Since 1999 the university's department of philosophy has published the journal Ethics & Politics [Etica & Politica] ISSN 1825-5167.

== See also ==
- List of Italian universities
- List of modern universities in Europe (1801–1945)
- International School for Advanced Studies
