= Spiridoula Matsika =

Greek theoretical chemist

- Born: 1971 (age 54–55)
- Citizenship: Greece
- Education: National and Kapodistrian University of Athens; Ohio State University
- Children: Alexandros Matsikas
- Scientific career
- Institutions: Temple University

Spiridoula Christos Matsika (born 1971) is a Greek theoretical chemist. She was elected as a fellow of the American Physical Society in 2014.

== Education ==
Spiridoula Christos Matsika was born in 1971 in Greece; she attended the National and Kapodistrian University of Athens for her bachelor's degree in chemistry, graduating in 1994. She completed her PhD at the Ohio State University, graduating in 2000 under the advisorship of Russell M. Pitzer. Following the completion of her PhD, she was a postdoctoral researcher at Johns Hopkins University under David Yarkony for three years.

== Career ==
In 2003 she was hired at Temple University as an assistant professor in its College of Science and Technology. She was promoted to associate professor in 2009 and full professor in 2014.

== Awards and honors ==
In 2005 she was awarded the National Science Foundation CAREER Award. She was awarded a Alexander von Humboldt Foundation fellowship in 2013. In 2014 she was elected as a fellow of the American Physical Society "for her contributions to understanding the dynamics of excited molecules around conical intersections and method development to calculate such at the highest levels of theory".
