= Mauro Barni (engineer) =

Italian engineer and professor

- Born: 30 June 1965 (age 61); Prato, Province of Florence, Italy
- Education: University of Florence
- Occupations: Engineer, academic

Mauro Barni (born 30 June 1965) is an Italian engineer and professor.

He graduated at University of Florence in 1991. In September 1998, he became associate professor at University of Siena, and then full professor. Barni was named Fellow of the Institute of Electrical and Electronics Engineers (IEEE) in 2012 «for contributions to signal and image processing for multimedia security».
