= Virginia Angiola Borrino =

Italian physician and pediatrician

- Born: Virginia Angiola Borrino; March 28, 1880; Cossato, Biella, Italy
- Died: January 14, 1965 (aged 84); Turin, Italy
- Citizenship: Kingdom of Italy; Italy
- Occupation: Pediatrician
- Years active: 1905–1955
- Known for: First Female Head of a University Pediatric Ward; Pioneering Academic Career; Founding Medical Associations; Advocacy for Women and Children
- Medical career
- Profession: Physician; Pediatrician; University professor
- Field: Medicine
- Institutions: Italian Association of Medical Women
- Sub-specialties: Pediatrics
- Research: Pediatrics
- Notable works: Puericoltura; Come si vince la malattia; La protezione delle donne e dei fanciulli nel lavoro; La mia vita. La pediatria agli inizi del '900 attraverso le memorie di una donna medico

Virginia Angiola Borrino (28 March 1880 – 14 January 1965) was an Italian physician and paediatrician in addition to being a university professor. Borrino was the first woman to serve as head of a university pediatric ward in Italy. She was one of the founding members of the Italian Association of Medical Women (Associazione Italiana Donne Medico).

== Early life and education ==
Virginia Angiola Borrino was born in a small hamlet called Mortigliengo in the county of Biella. The last of four children, she lost her father at the age of eight and ended up being raised by her mother and her father's brother (Quinto Borrino). Her vocation for medicine dates back to her childhood conversations with a doctor, one of her uncle's friends. She graduated in medicine and surgery in 1905 in Turin. She then spent a year in Florence, where she worked with Giuseppe Maya, who led her to move to Breslavia. During her degree, she also developed a particular interest in infant physiology, thanks to the influence of Doctor Angelo Mosso (and in particular his works Fatica and Paura) and Amedeo Herlitzka. Her interest in children's health was also sparked by her gynaecology internship, where she would take care of children that had been abandoned. There were very few women at this time in the medical field. She tended to talk very little while carefully listening to her male colleagues. This led them to call her "crystal-lined" (foderata di cristallo in Italian), as she was often on the sides of the conversations, but still very attentive.

== First job experiences ==
Her first job experience took place in Wrocław, but she soon moved to Charlottenburg, Berlin, where she worked in the Charité pediatric clinic while she was studying with Professor Finkelstein in the nursery where she treated many infants from all origins, both sick and healthy, which had been separated from their mothers.

She spent two months in Paris at the clinic run by Professor Marfan, who thoroughly studied newborns breastfeeding, and then she was offered a position at the private hospital Regina Margherita (in Turin) as an assistant. Here accidents were quite common. This led her to pay more attention to how poor surveillance of children could cause infant deaths that could be avoided. Turin is also where she gave her first lectures, which were about the newly born Montessori method and other educational issues. Her professorship in paediatrics, therefore, began in 1913.

In Magna Sila (1912–1918) she was offered a job by Professor Gosio (a bacteriologist). She would run an anti-malaria sanatorium for children. She also ended up taking care of any type of disease and patient, as well as several wounded soldiers due to war. There was also an outbreak of the Spanish flu, which devastated Europe and killed more than 20 million people. She had a great urge to go back to her family in Turin, but had to limit herself to sending just a few letters with general medical advice and a few comforting words. Together with Ester Penati, her dearest friend, Borrino founded a maternal nursery in Turin that would become a model all over Italy for sheltering both mothers and children without a family. It was the first institution in Italian legislation with the aim of protecting rights in early childhood which were missed in the Italian health organization, dating back to 1885 whose laws protected the rights of only women and children. During WWI, Virginia offered her abilities in battlefield hospitals, but since her knowledge as a paediatrician was strongly needed for civilians, she continued taking care of women and children.

At the end of the war, she finally received her first chair for paediatrics at the University of Siena from Prof. Ferdinando Micheli, a famous medical pathologist.

== Siena and the unfortunate bimbi soli ==
In Siena, she worked in a small clinic that lacked medical staff, an outpatient clinic, and even rooms for the ill. After the death of Professor Maya, who followed and encouraged Borrino while in Florence, she found herself in the ruthless and competitive university environment where, also, the idea of a female doctor was not considered at all. Nevertheless, she was not only able to create an outpatient clinic and a library in the clinic where she was working, but she also avoided the possible closure of the clinic because of the higher education reform proposed by the new education minister Giovanni Gentile; also, she contributed to the creation of the Cassa Scolastica for students in unstable financial situations. In 1921 she created the Committee of Young Mothers, an institution dedicated to the so-called bimbi soli, lonely children without a family. Later on, thanks to her experience, especially to the time spent in Siena, she contributed to the law of 1927 about the protection of motherhood and childhood and also one for illegitimate children. In 1924 the government tried to fill all the university chairs that remained empty after the war, but the only two for pediatrics were those of Cagliari and Siena; the first was assigned to a colleague from Bologna and the second one not so claimed. One year later she managed to win the competition for the chair of pediatrics at the new medical course at the University of Bari.

== Form Bari to Sassari: the gender gap ==
Waiting for the results from the University of Bari, she travelled back to her home in Cossato, where she dedicated herself to curing the townspeople. When the results of the University of Bari's admission test arrived, she discovered to her dismay that she had arrived second, but due to the presence of only two teaching positions and the third candidate being a man, he was favoured over her and she was then pushed to third place. Her previous attempt at the teaching position at the University of Sassari, which led to her coming in first but not getting the job due to the unavailability of positions, was made free due to the death of one of the doctors. People tried to stop her, since she was a woman, by letting the two-year limit before new admission tests elapse by appointing someone lower than her. Luckily, the position was open again before the two-year limit, resulting in her obtaining a professorship in the field of clinical paediatrics.

== Struggles in Sardinia ==
The journey to Sardinia was not easy. After a 29-hour-long boat ride, Doctor Borrino found herself in a poor, hostile, and fatiguing land filled with malnutrition and a poor health system. The Agnelli family who was friends with Doctor Borrino, helped her a lot by providing diapers, clothing, and other items needed by children at the clinic. The job was focused on three aspects: the organization of free clinics in all of Sardinia, care for mothers and their children, and the study of factors hostile to the child's life that were the cause of all of these hardships. Despite the good work done by Borrino over four years, and the growing appreciation towards her by the people, local politicians tried to remove her teaching position to give it to another doctor favoured by said politicians. At the end of the four years, she transferred to Perugia for another teaching position in 1931. This concluded a difficult time in Sardinia, during which she lost both her brother and her mother.

== Umbria ==
It was not easy for Borrino to leave the island, so she had to send a letter to Quirinale to be allowed to finally move to the city of Perugia. Here the clinic was more than modest: it lacked books, instruments, proper examination rooms, and so on. She strongly insisted on making changes and was finally able to have both the physicians and obstetricians take advanced courses. She was also able to hold a conference of the Italian Society of Pediatrics in 1932, and use a fund to build better spaces (enough to take care of sixty children). Unfortunately, in 1943 those rooms were occupied by the Nazis, and could not be used until the year after, when they were defeated in the region.

== The end of a long-lived career ==
The last years of Borrino's career were not easy at all, since they corresponded to the years of WWII. She was hoping to be moved to Modena but was unable to make it. Then she tried to get into Turin, and after some struggle was transferred there by the minister of the time, thanks to a scientific review written by the IBI (Istituto Chimico Scientifico).

== Supporting women and abandoned children ==
Before WWI, Borrino was able to build a nursery, with her friend Ester Penati, in which both teenage mothers and their newborns could be taken care of. Then, in Siena, she created the Committee of Young Mothers. Her fight was somewhat heard when the O.N.M.I. law (1925) on special motherhood and infantry assistance was signed. However, this law was not truly as efficient as it sounded. From 1923 Borrino was on the front line for social preventive action against minors' prostitution. In 1935, she was invited to host a nursery for children whose mothers were in prison (often found malnourished, mentally unstable, and uneducated). In 1938 an international congress on this matter took place in Rome. Unfortunately, Italy decided to display the wrong data to make it look better than it was and threatened her from publishing her studies, which came out only nine years later (in 1947).

== Puericoltura ==
Puericoltura, written by Borrino and published in 1945 by Topography Vincenzo Bona of Turin, was ultimately intended to be a textbook strictly dedicated to doctors to provide them with useful information regarding both the healthy and the sick child, to improve diagnosis and treatments of typical childhood diseases. However, Borrino decided to add further details and explanations to make it available not only for doctors but for anyone who was involved in child-rearing.

It is organized into three main chapters:

- The healthy child
- The sick child
- The social assistance of the child

She considered that since the times of the Crimean War, thanks to the figure of Florence Nightingale, the need for trained people for both the assistance and cure of the sick was clear. Likewise, the book increased the awareness of the need for people specifically qualified to care for and cure children, who were identified as independent beings compared to the adult, who needed special techniques of preparation and administration of food and medicines, special cleaning manual skills, of movements, of treatments, particularities of understanding the patient and behaviour towards them are fundamental in the assistance of the child.

The First Special Schools for Nursing of Children arose in America, England, Switzerland, Austria and also in Italy, including the Institute for Child Care conceived by Borrino herself in Perugia. Also, the Red Cross started providing a pediatric female education, which Borrino hoped would become a base for all women's training schools. Since the preparation of child care personnel varies according to the special tasks and role that they have to assume, it is necessary to have different schools and different education for each category. Each of these schools must include the teaching of various disciplines and both theoretical preparation and practical training since theory and practical applications must proceed hand in hand.

== Bibliography ==
- Angiola Borrino, Virginia, 2017. La mia vita. Hoepli, Milano.
- Angiola Borrino, Virginia, 1937. Puericultura. Unione Tipografico - Editrice Torinese.
- Farnetani, Italo, 2018. Pediatria Preventiva & Sociale. Anno XIII, art. 4.
