= University of L'Aquila =

University in L'Aquila, Italy

Coordinates: 42.3566°N 13.3829°E

- Università degli Studi dell'Aquila
- Coat of arms
- Former name: Aquilanum Collegium
- Motto: Renovabitur ut aquilae juventus tua (Latin)
- Motto in English: Your youth is renewed like the eagle's
- Type: State-supported
- Established: 1596 ( as L'aquilanum Collegium); 1964 (as modern university)
- Students: 18,196 (2015/2016)
- Location: L'Aquila, Italy
- Campus: Urban/University town
- Sports teams: www.cuslaquila.org
- Colors: Green, Yellow, Black
- Website: www.univaq.it

The University of L'Aquila (Italian: Università degli Studi dell'Aquila) is a public research university located in L'Aquila, Central Italy. It was founded in 1964 (its history begins in 1596) and is organized in nine departments.

== History ==
On 11 October 1458 and again on 9 May 1464, the city of L'Aquila petitioned King Ferdinand of Aragon to open a Studium equivalent to those in Bologna, Siena and Perugia. Shortly before, the town had withdrawn support for the last of the Angevin and surrendered to the Spanish sovereign. The King granted this request, but there is no documentary evidence to suggest that the city authorities opened the Studium. On the other hand, records do show that both before and after the date of the petition, citizens of L'Aquila (Fra' Giovanni da Capestrano, for example, and Berardino di Ludovico, nephew to the chronicler Francesco d'Angeluccio di Bazzano, who took a degree in 1474) went to study civil and canon law at the Studium in Perugia. During the last years of the late 16th century, from 1596 on, the Jesuits were providing higher instruction at their college in L'Aquila. When, by a decree of 1767, the Jesuits were expelled from the Kingdom, the Aquilanum Collegium became the Collegio Reale. To the chairs of theology, philosophy and history, mathematics, literature and Greek were added, in 1785, those of sciences such as chemistry, anatomy and the theory and practice of medicine, and in 1792 surgery and midwifery. But when, by the decree of 30 May 1807, Joseph Napoleon reorganized all the Royal Colleges, he suppressed the one in L'Aquila and opened one at the Abbey of the Holy Spirit of Morrone, near Sulmona.

Seven years later, on 21 August 1814, a school of higher instruction for the whole Abruzzi area, with university level teaching in medicine, was inaugurated in L'Aquila by Joachim Murat, Napoleon's brother-in-law and king of Naples. Immediately after the Restoration, by a decree on 14 January 1817, King Ferdinand settled that in L'Aquila, as in Bari, Salerno and Catanzaro, a Reale Liceo be opened, teaching law, anatomy and physiology, surgery and midwifery, chemistry and pharmaceutical studies as well as forensic medicine and various scientific subjects. By a decree of 3 December 1874, the students of the L'Aquila Reale Liceo were recognised as qualified to practise pharmacy, surgery and land-surveying, but degrees were conferred by the University of Naples, upon which the Licei were dependent. As a result of this decree, the number of students attending the school in L'Aquila, which in 1861 had become the Scuola Universitaria di Farmacia, Notariato e Chirurgia minore, dropped considerably.

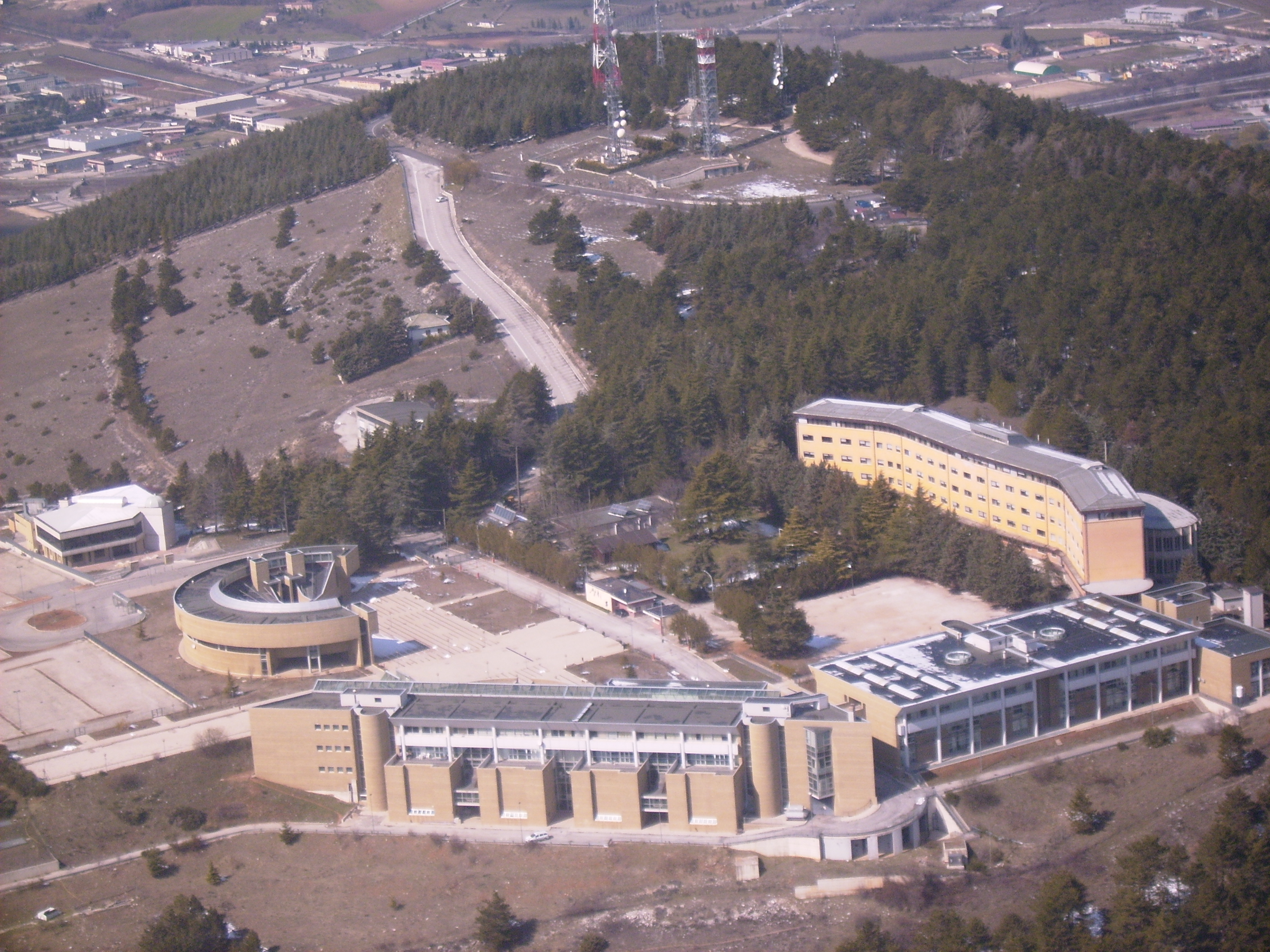
The Faculty of Engineering buildings

In 1923 the "University Schools" ceased to exist. It was not until the summer of 1949 that, due to the efforts of Vincenzo Rivera, professor of agricultural science, fellow of the Accademia Italiana, member of the Constituent Assembly of Italy and deputy, summer courses at university level were started in L'Aquila mainly for the benefit of Abruzzi students enrolled at the University of Rome. The success enjoyed by these courses formed the foundation for a free University of L'Aquila, and, thanks to support from local bodies, on 15 December 1952 teaching was inaugurated at the Istituto Universitario di Magistero. It was also thanks to Rivera that an astronomical observatory was established at Campo Imperatore on the Gran Sasso, at 2200 m above sea level, as well as the observatory and high altitude botanical gardens, the geo-dynamics observatory, the national magnetism observatory and the museum of paleontology.

The creation of an institute of medicine is due to the efforts of professor Paride Stefanini. In the academic year 1982-83 the Faculties of Education, Medicine, Engineering and Sciences, which had until that time constituted the free University of L'Aquila (established by a decree of the President of the Republic of 18 August 1964), became state institutions. In 1985 the Faculty of Medicine established the first Italian chair of pediatric Otolaryngology. In 1991 the Faculty of Economics was added and in 1993 the Faculty of Education became the Faculty of Letters and Philosophy. The late 1990s saw the addition of two new faculties: Educational Sciences in 1996 and Sport Sciences in 1999. In 2005 the Faculty of Psychology and the Faculty of Biotechnologies were established.

=== Consequences of the 2009 earthquake ===
The university was badly affected by the 2009 L'Aquila earthquake, with fifty-five students killed and only two buildings on the university's two out-of-town campuses remaining structurally sound. The new academic year has found the university conducting a full program of reconstruction. The university has rented new buildings for the faculty members who lost their campus space during the earthquake and a new student residence has been created. In addition, many services have been provided to students affected by the earthquake and reconstruction of the damaged university buildings has started.

== Organization ==
Rankings
- ARWU (2015, national): 650-700
- THE (2014/15, world): 501–600
- CENSIS-La Repubblica (state large-sized universities) (2014, national): 14
- Il Sole 24 Ore (state universities) (2015, national): 53

These are the 7 departments in which the university is divided into:

- Department of Biotechnological and Applied Clinical Sciences
- Department of Industrial and Information Engineering and Economics
- Department of Human Studies
- Department of Civil, Construction-Architectural and Environmental Engineering
- Department of Physical and Chemical Sciences
- Department of Information Engineering, Computer Science and Mathematics
- Department of Life, Health and Environmental Sciences

== Features ==
- Alpine Botanical Garden of Campo Imperatore
- Orto Botanico dell'Università dell'Aquila
- CETEMPS: this Centre of Excellence for the integration of remote sensing techniques and numerical modelling for the early warning of severe meteorological events has the main objective of developing techniques to prevent and predict meteorological phenomena which may lead to flooding and landslides.
- DEWS (Design Methodologies of Embedded Controllers). This center is focusing on the use of the advanced electronics. In the 2000s the Centre directed its research towards design, implementation and management of wireless sensor and actuator networks.
- Microscopy Centre. This is an inter-departmental service centre of the University of L'Aquila. The main aim is to provide scientific assistance to Departments active in the field of microscopy while also offering service in this area to local, national and international productive, scientific and teaching institutions.
- Language Centre. This center offers courses in English, French, German, Spanish, Portuguese, Russian and an Italian courses for foreign students.
- Sport Center (C.U.S., or Centro Universitario Sportivo). The structure includes a football and rugby field, two fields for football and rugby on 7 and on 5, two tennis courts, one court for volleyball and basketball, one gym structure for fitness, climbing and martial arts. The university has a convention with the municipal swimming pool and the Campo Imperatore ski resort (about 20 km from the city center).

== See also ==
- List of Italian universities
- L'Aquila
- List of Jesuit sites
