= University of Siena =

Italian university

- Università degli Studi di Siena
- Latin: Universitatis Senarum
- Type: Public
- Established: 1240; 786 years ago
- Affiliations: Coimbra Group; IRUN
- Rector: Roberto Di Pietra
- Students: 15,589 (academic year 2021-22)
- Location: Siena, Italy; 43°19′9″N 11°19′57″E
- Campus: Both Urban/University town and suburban
- Sports teams: CUS Siena
- Website: www.unisi.it

The University of Siena (Italian: Università degli Studi di Siena, abbreviation: UNISI), located in Siena, Tuscany, holds the distinction of being Italy's first publicly funded university as well as one of the oldest, originally established as Studium Senese in 1240. As of 2022, it hosts approximately 16,000 students—nearly one-third of Siena's total population of about 53,000. The university is renowned for its schools of law, medicine, and economics and management.

== History ==
=== The early studium ===
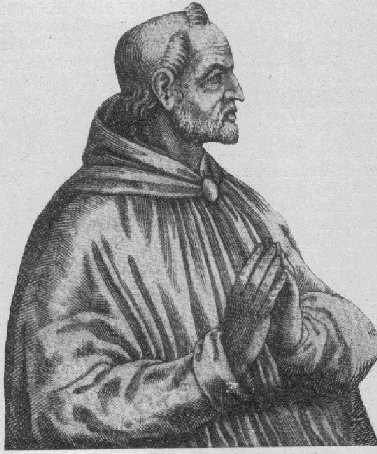
Pietro Ispano (Pope John XXI)

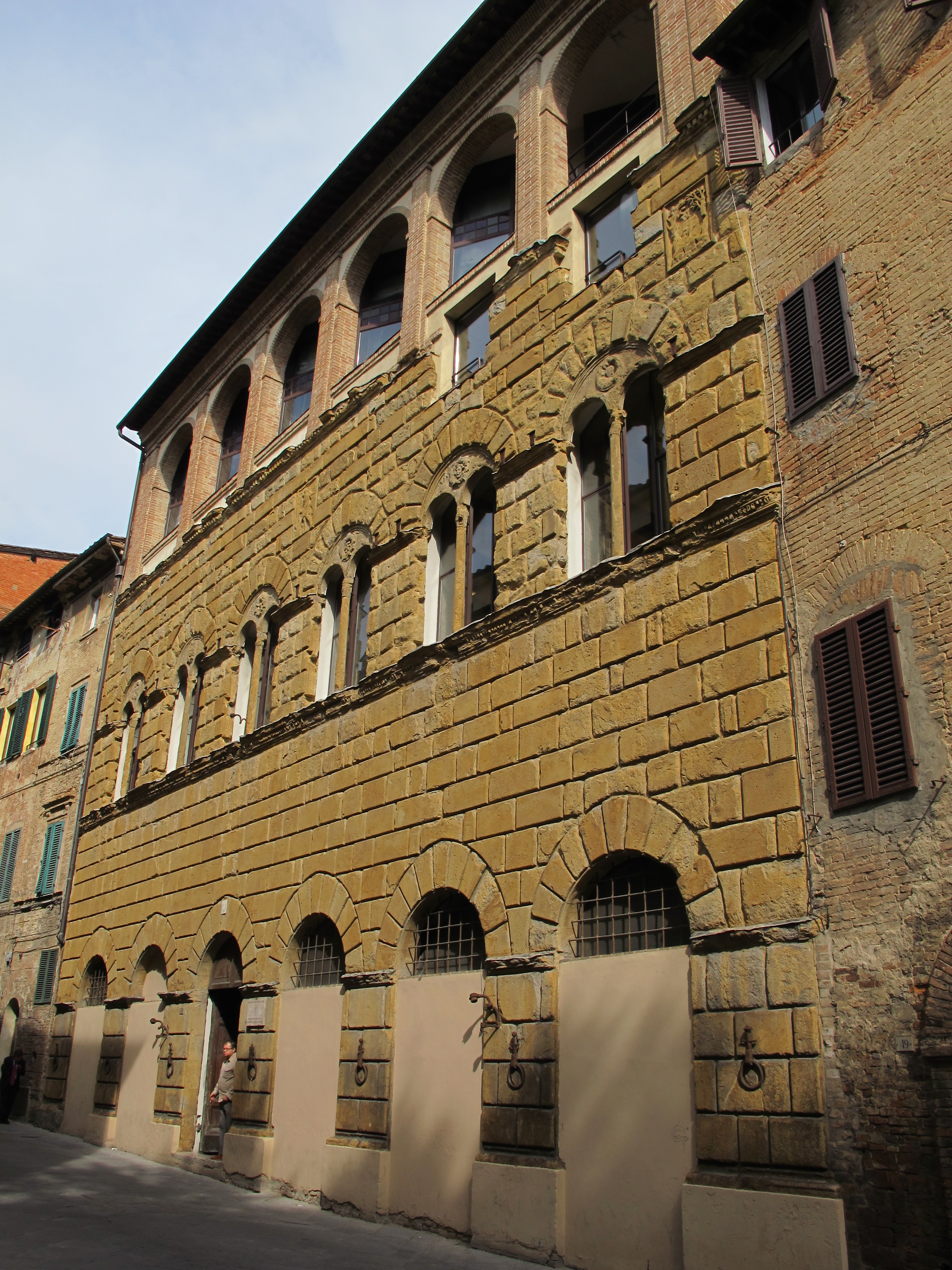
Palazzo San Galgano, The School of Humanities and Philosophy

==== The School of Humanities and Philosophy ====
On December 26, 1240, Ildebrandino Cacciaconti, the then podestà of Siena, signed a decree imposing a tax on citizens of Siena who rented rooms to students of the local "Studium Senese". The money from this tax went towards paying for the salaries of the maestri (teachers) of this new studium. The studium was further supported when, in 1252, Pope Innocent IV declared both its teachers and students completely immune from taxes and forced labour levied on their person or property by the city of Siena. Moreover, the commune exempted teachers of law and Latin from military service and teachers of Latin were also excused from their duties as night watchmen. By the early 14th century, there were five teachers of Latin, logic and law and two doctors of natural sciences (medicine).

One of the most notable maestri of the School of Medicine was Pietro Ispano (Pope John XXI). Ispano was a philosopher, a personal doctor to Emperor Frederick II, and in 1276 became Pope John XXI.

In 1321, the studium was able to attract a larger number of pupils due to a mass exodus from the prestigious University of Bologna when one of its students was sentenced to death by Bologna's magistrates for supposedly kidnapping a young woman. Partly at the instigation of their law lecturer Guglielmo Tolomei, the student body there unleashed a great protest at the Bolognese authority and Siena, supported by funding from the local commune, was able to accommodate the students resigning from the Studium Bolognese.

=== The university under changing states ===
The studium of Siena was eventually promoted to the status of "Studium Generale" by Charles IV, shortly after his coronation as Holy Roman Emperor in 1355. This both placed the teachers and students under the safeguard of the imperial authority (protecting them from the local magistracy) and also meant that the licences (licentiae docendi) granted by the university were "ubique docendi".

These licences entitled the person receiving them to teach throughout Christendom.

The Casa della Sapienza was built in the early 15th century as a center that combines classrooms and housing for those enrolled in the Studium. It had been proposed by bishop Francesco Mormile in 1392, was completed twenty years later, and its first occupants took up residence in 1416. Room and board in 1416 cost fifty gold florins for a semester.

By the mid-14th century, Siena had declined as a power in Tuscany, eclipsed by the rise in power of Florence, who defeated the Republic of Siena in 1555. The city authorities, however, successfully asked the Medici (the hereditary dukes of Florence at the time) to preserve the academy. Francesco and later Grand Duke Ferdinando I, reforms were made with new statutes and new prerogatives. The post of Rettore (Rector), elected by students and city magistrates, was also instituted.

In 1737, the Medici line became extinct and the rule of Tuscany passed to the French House of Lorraine. In this period, the Tuscan economist Sallustio Bandini, seemingly determined to "improve the intellectual stimulation of his native Siena" solicited scholarships from rich patrons for the university and also set up a large library, which he eventually bequeathed to the university.

In 1808, when the Napoleonic forces occupied Tuscany, they eliminated the Studium Senese and the doors of the University were not opened again until after the defeat of Napoleon and the restoration of Ferdinand III as the Grand Duke of Tuscany.

=== The university in the Risorgimento ===
During the Risorgimento, the movement towards the unification of Italy as a single state, Sienese students organised groups which were openly patriotic. They publicly expressed their dissent and, during the April 1848 revolts in Tuscany, three professors, one assistant and fifty-five students formed the Compagnia della Guardia Universitaria to participate in the battles of Curtatone and of Montanara. The troop's flag is still preserved in the Chancellor's building. All of this passion for the new republic could not but trouble the Grand Duke and in the end he closed down the School of Medicine permitting only Law and Theology to continue.

University rankings

Global – Overall
- QS World: =607 (2026)

After the Second Italian War of Independence in 1859 and its aftermath, Tuscany and with it Siena were controlled by the Kingdom of Sardinia, which was to become the Kingdom of Italy, now the Italian Republic. The Sienese academy eventually recovered from the unrest, thanks to initiatives by the city's private enterprises and a series of legislative acknowledgements that boosted the reputation of the School of Pharmacy and that of Obstetrics (and consequently the School of Medicine itself) while the old hospital Santa Maria della Scala was transformed into General University Hospital. Some time later in 1880, the Law Faculty established the Circolo Giuridico or Legal Circle, where issues pertaining to law studies were examined in depth through seminars and lectures.

=== The university in modern Italy ===
In 1892, the Minister of Public Education, Ferdinando Martini, launched a proposal aimed at suppressing the Sienese academy's activities. Siena perceived this as a declaration of war and was backed immediately by a general tradesmen's strike, the intervention of all of the town's institutions and by a genuine uprising of the population – all of which induced the minister to withdraw the project. Having escaped this danger, the town went back to investing its resources in the university setting up new degrees and new faculties. The bank Monte dei Paschi di Siena financed the construction of the biology department.

The 20th century witnessed the growth of the University of Siena, with the student population escalating from four hundred between the wars to more than 15,000 in the last few years.

== Notable alumni and faculty ==
- Pietro Ispano (c. 1215–1277), Pope John XXI, Professor of Medicine
- Cino da Pistoia (1270–1336/37), Professor of Law
- Antonio de Venafro (1459–1530), advisor to Pandolfo Petrucci, Ruler of the Republic of Siena
- Giovanni Maria Ciocchi del Monte (1487–1555), Pope Julius III, studied law at Siena
- Francesco Accarigi (c. 1557–1622), Professor of Civil Law
- Fabio Chigi, Pope Alexander VII
- Domenico Barduzzi (1847–1929), dermatologist and hydrologist
- Arrigo Solmi (1873–1944), Minister of Justice in the cabinet of Benito Mussolini
- Virginia Angiola Borrino (1880–1965), Professor of Medicine and the first woman to serve as head of a University Pediatric Ward in Italy
- Piero Calamandrei (1889–1956), Professor at the Law school in Siena
- Carlo Rosselli (1899–1937), political leader, journalist, historian and anti-fascist activist
- Richard M. Goodwin (1913–1996), Professor, mathematician and economist
- Norberto Bobbio (1909–2004), Professor of Philosophy
- Frank Hahn (1925–2013), Professor of Economics, Director of the PhD program of the Economics Department
- Mauro Barni (1927–2017), Professor of Bioethics, Rector and Mayor of Siena
- Jean Blondel (1929–2022), Professor of comparative politics
- Luigi Berlinguer (1932–2023), Professor of Law, Rector and Minister of Education
- Samuel Bowles (born 1939), American economist, professor of Economics
- Steven Lukes (born 1941), British sociologist
- Antonio Tabucchi (1943–2012), Italian writer, Professor of Portuguese language and literature
- Paul Ginsborg (1945–2022), British historian, Professor of Contemporary History
- Riccardo Francovich (1946–2007), archaeologist and professor of Medieval archaeology
- Desiderio Passali (born 1947), former director of the ENT department and professor of otolaryngology
- Silvana Sciarra (born 1948), former President of the Constitutional Court of Italy
- Rino Rappuoli (born 1952), Italian Biologist, chief scientist of GSK
- Carlo Cottarelli (born 1954), economist and former director of the International Monetary Fund
- Gianna Nannini (born 1954), Italian pop singer
- Emanuele Papi (born 1959), professor of classical archaeologist, director of Italian Archaeological School of Athens
- Yusuf Garaad Omar (born 1960), journalist and politician, former Somali Minister of Foreign Affairs
- Antonio Giordano (born 1962), Professor of Pathology
- Carlo Bellieni (born 1962), associate professor of Pediatrics, bioethicist
- Domenico Prattichizzo (born 1965), Professor of Robotics and Automation
- Stefano Caselli (born 1969), economist and Professor at SDA Bocconi School of Management
- Luigi Marattin (born 1979), politician and economist

== Organization ==
Since 2012, after the general reform of Italian Universities ("Gelmini Act"), the university is composed of fourteen departments, grouped in four areas:

- Biomedical and Medical Sciences
  - Department of Medical Biotechnologies
  - Department of Molecular and Developmental Medicine
  - Department of Medicine, Surgery and Neuroscience
- Economics, Law and Political Sciences
  - Department of Economics and Statistics
  - Department of Law
  - Department of Political and International Sciences
  - Department of Business and Law
- Experimental Sciences
  - Department of Biotechnology, Chemistry and Pharmacy
  - Department of Information Engineering and Mathematics
  - Department of Life Sciences
  - Department of Physical Sciences, Earth and Environment
- Literature, History, Philosophy and the Arts
  - Department of Philology and Literary Criticism
  - Department of Social, Political and Cognitive Sciences
  - Department of History and Cultural Heritage

Each department offers graduate and undergraduate courses.

Since 2014 the Department of Economics and Statistics and the Department of Business and Law merged their undergraduate and graduate courses into the School of Economics and Management (SEM).

Formerly, the university was composed of nine schools:

- The School of Economics
- The School of Engineering
- The School of Humanities and Philosophy
- The School of Humanities and Philosophy – Arezzo
- The School of Jurisprudence
- The School of Mathematical, Physical and Natural Sciences
- The School of Medicine and Surgery
- The School of Pharmacy
- The School of Political Science

Siena's campus is the city. 15,600 students live among the 53,000 Sienese. The university prides itself on diversity.

Recently, the university has returned historical buildings to the city, which are being made into apartments or used by the contradas. The university is responsible for many buildings at risk being saved, turned into institutions of study. The faculties of Engineering and Literature, for example, have found space for their departments in the large rooms of what was once the San Niccolò Psychiatric Hospital. Another example is the transformation of the former Convent of Santa Chiara into the first collegiate residence in Italy, reserved for those working towards a European postgraduate degree. The church of San Vigilio serves as university chapel.

New university buildings have also been built in the city centre such as the one that houses the Faculty of Political Science and Law. The ten university dormitories are located within the historical centre (Fontebranda, Mattioli, Porrione, Sperandie, San Marco), on the outskirts (Acquacalda) and near the extended areas of the university (San Miniato).

== Degree Courses ==
For the academic year 2022–23 the following degree courses were provided (medium of instruction in parentheses)

- Biotechnologies, Medicine, Dentistry, Health Professions
  - Undergraduate (3 years)
    - Audioprothesic techniques (in Italian)
    - Biomedical laboratory techniques (in Italian)
    - Biotechnologies (in Italian)
    - Cardiocirculatory and cardiovascular perfusion techniques (in Italian)
    - Dental hygiene (in Italian)
    - Dietistic (in Italian)
    - Environment and the workplace prevention techniques (in Italian)
    - Imaging and radiotherapy techniques (in Italian)
    - Midwifery (in Italian)
    - Nursing (in Italian)
    - Orthoptic and ophthalmologic assistance (in Italian)
    - Physiotherapy (in Italian)
    - Speech and language therapy (in Italian)
  - Graduate (2 years)
    - Biotechnologies of human reproduction (in English)
    - Genetic counsellors (in English)
    - Health professions of rehabilitation sciences (in Italian)
    - Medical biotechnologies (in English)
    - Nursing and midwifery sciences (in Italian)
  - Single cycle (6 years)
    - Dentistry and dental prosthodontics (in English)
    - Medicine and surgery (in Italian)
- Economics, Law, Political Sciences, Social Sciences
  - Pre-university (1 year)
    - Foundation Course of the School of Economics and Management (in English)
  - Undergraduate (3 years)
    - Communication sciences (in Italian)
    - Economics and banking (in Italian)
    - Economics and business (in Italian)
    - Economics and management (in English)
    - Legal services (in Italian)
    - Political sciences (in Italian)
    - Social work (in Italian)
  - Graduate (2 years)
    - Communication strategies and techniques (in Italian)
    - Economics (in English)
    - Economics and management of financial institutions (in Italian)
    - Economics for the environment and sustainability (in Italian)
    - Finance (in English)
    - International accounting and management (in English)
    - International studies (in Italian and English)
    - Language and mind: linguistics and cognitive studies (in English)
    - Management and governance (in Italian)
    - Public and cultural diplomacy (in English)
    - Sciences of administrations (in Italian)
    - Social sustainability and welfare management (in Italian)
    - Statistics for sample surveys (in Italian)
  - Single cycle (5 years)
    - Law (in Italian)
- Environmental Sciences, Biology, Chemistry, Pharmacy, Geology
  - Undergraduate (3 years)
    - Agribusiness (in Italian)
    - Biological sciences (in Italian)
    - Chemical sciences (in Italian)
    - Geological sciences (in Italian)
    - Natural and environmental sciences (in Italian)
  - Graduate (2 years)
    - Biodiversity, conservation and environmental quality (in English)
    - Biology (in Italian and English)
    - Chemistry (in English)
    - Ecotoxicology and environmental sustainability (in Italian)
    - Geological sciences and technologies (in Italian)
    - Health biology (in Italian)
    - Sustainable industrial pharmaceutical biotechnology (in English)
  - Single cycle (5 years)
    - Pharmaceutical chemistry and technology (in Italian)
    - Pharmacy (in Italian)
- Physics, Engineering, Mathematics
  - Undergraduate (3 years)
    - Computer and information engineering (in Italian)
    - Engineering management (in Italian)
    - Mathematics (in Italian)
    - Physics and advanced technologies (in Italian)
  - Graduate (2 years)
    - Applied mathematics (in English)
    - Artificial intelligence and automation engineering (in English)
    - Electronics and communications engineering (in English)
    - Engineering management (in English)
- Cultural Heritage, Education, Literature, Languages, History, Philosophy
  - Undergraduate (3 years)
    - Education (in Italian)
    - History and cultural heritage (in Italian)
    - Languages for intercultural and business communication (in Italian)
    - Studies in literature and philosophy (in Italian)
  - Graduate (2 years)
    - Anthropology and visual studies (in Italian)
    - Archaeology (in Italian)
    - Classics (in Italian)
    - Education sciences and educational consulting for organizations (in Italian)
    - History and philosophy (in Italian)
    - History of art (in Italian)
    - Italian studies (in Italian)
    - Language and mind: linguistics and cognitive studies (in English)

== Points of interest ==
- Orto Botanico dell'Università di Siena, the university's botanical garden

== See also ==
- Coimbra Group (a network of leading European universities)
- List of medieval universities
- List of Italian universities
- Siena
- WebCrow

== Bibliography ==
- de Ridder-Symoens, Hilde: A History of the University in Europe, Volume 1: Universities in the Middle Ages. Cambridge University Press, 1992 ISBN 0-521-54113-1
- Waley, Daniel: Siena and the Sienese in the thirteenth century. Cambridge University Press, 1991 ISBN 0-521-40312-X
- Wahnbaeck, Till: Luxury and Public Happiness: Political Economy in the Italian Enlightenment Oxford University Press, 2004 ISBN 0-19-926983-1
