= Orto Botanico dell'Università dell'Aquila =

Botanical garden in Italy

Coordinates: 42°23′14″N 13°24′49″E

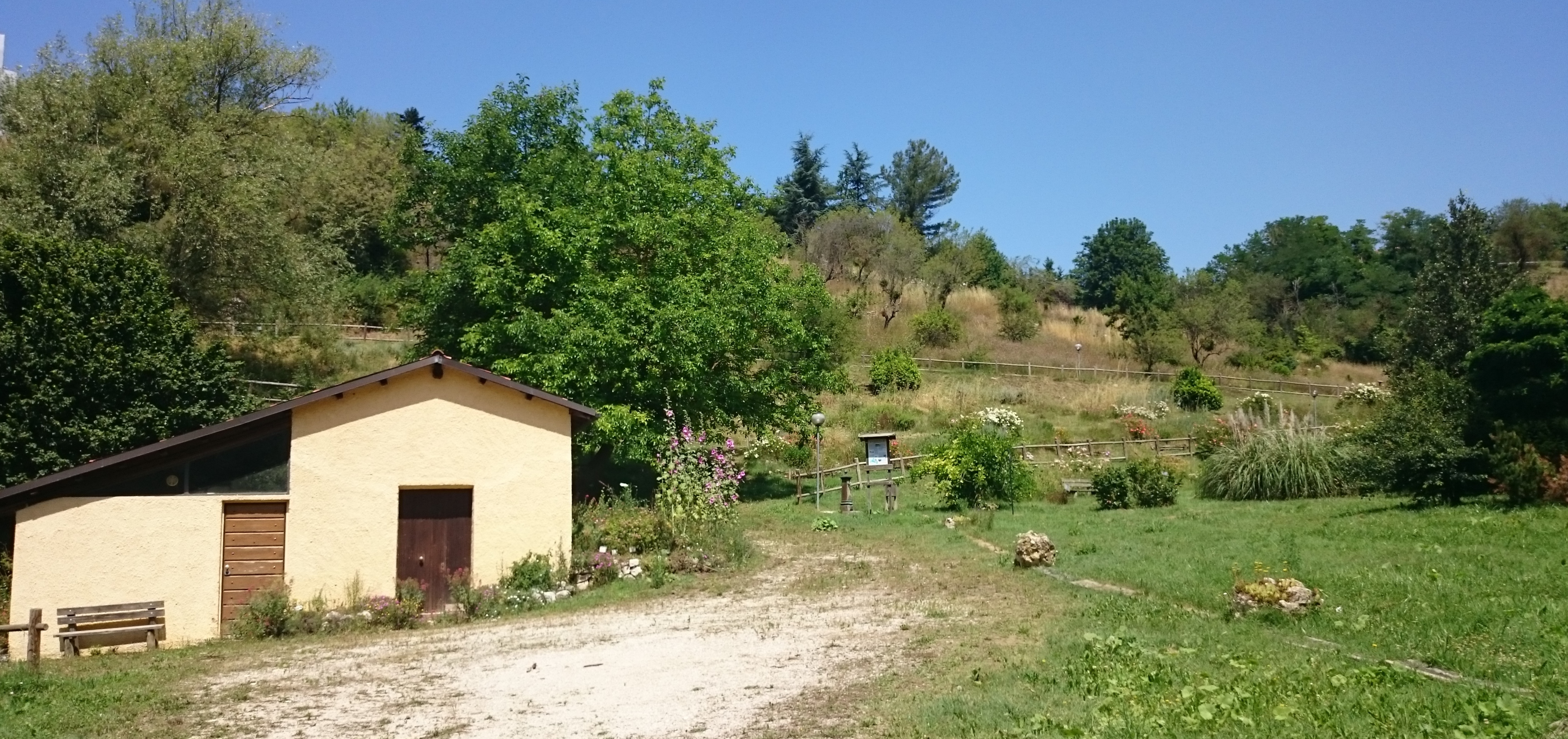
Orto Botanico di Collemaggio

The Orto Botanico dell'Università dell'Aquila, also known as the Orto Botanico di Collemaggio, is a botanical garden in L'Aquila, Abruzzo, central Italy, operated by the University of L'Aquila. Measuring 5.5 hectares, it is located near the basilica di Collemaggio.

The garden contains about 460 species, including many indigenous to Abruzzo such as Adonis flammea subsp. cortiana, Anchusa hybrida, Campanula cavolinii, Cerastium scarani, Dianthus ciliatus, and Linaria purpurea.

== See also ==
- List of botanical gardens in Italy
