= Temple University College of Science and Technology =

Temple University's College of Science and Technology houses, the departments of Biology, Chemistry, Computer & Information Sciences, Earth & Environmental Science, Mathematics, and Physics. It has 200 faculties and 4000 undergraduates and graduate students. Michael L. Klein is dean of the college, and Laura H. Carnell is the Professor.

It was founded in 1998 from the science departments, which was then the College of Arts and Sciences. The College of Science and Technology offers bachelor's, master's, and doctoral degrees in all six departments as well as science with teaching bachelor's degrees through the TUteach program, based on the UTeach program.

== Undergraduate Research Program ==
The College of Science and Technology offers the CST Undergraduate Research Program (URP). Students selected to participate work with a faculty sponsor to perform research in the faculty member's lab. Students may be asked to participate in conferences, author papers or to showcase their research work in the department or at the URP Research Symposium.

== Centers and Institutes for Advanced Research & Education ==
- Center for Advanced Photonics Research
- Center for Biophysics and Computational Biology
- Center for Computational Genetics and Genomics
- Center for Data Analytics and Biomedical Informatics
- Center for Materials Theory
- Institute for Computational Molecular Science
- Sbarro Health Research Organization

== Research Support Facilities ==
- Research and Instructional Support Facility (RISF)
- Solid Phase Peptide Synthesis and Analysis (SPPS)
- Materials Research Facility

== Faculty ==
- Antonio Giordano, Biology
- Michael L. Klein, Chemistry
- Jie Wu, Computer & Information Sciences
- Igor Rivin, Mathematics
- Xiaoxing Xi, Physics

== Alumni ==
- F. Albert Cotton, chemist
- Angelo DiGeorge, pediatric endocrinologist
- Bernard Roizman, virologist
- Herbert Scarf, mathematical economist
