= Francesco Accarigi =

Italian jurist and professor (1557–1622)

Francesco Accarigi (c. 1557 – 1622) was an Italian jurist and professor of civil law at the University of Siena in Tuscany. Born in Macerata, he spent much of his life in Siena and was considered a native of the latter city.

In his youth, Accarigi had enjoyed the friendship of Bargalio and Benevento, men who had acquired considerable reputation for their knowledge of the law. He received his doctorate from Siena in 1580. In 1581, he was first called to the professorial chair but was only employed to explain the Institutiones of Justinian. Later, in 1589, his lectures were extended to the Pandects, when he became the first assigned that new professorship, which he held until 1593. While the professorship was intended to teach humanistic jurisprudence, he combined mos italicus and mos gallicus in his lectures.

He was then appointed, by the grand duke Ferdinand I, to lecture upon civil law in general, after the manner of Jacques Cujas.

At length, upon the death of Bargalio, Accarigi was promoted to the chair of ordinary professor of law, which he occupied for twenty years. So high was the reputation which he acquired in this office, that very advantageous proposals were repeatedly made to him from other Italian universities. His partiality to his alma mater, and his gratitude to his patron, long prevented him from listening to them. However, when Ranuccio I Farnese, Duke of Parma added, to the very high salary of 1,300 ducatoni, the proposal of giving him the title of ducal counsellor, the temptation was irresistible, and Accarigi moved to Parma in 1613. In 1618, Ferdinand I was able to recall him, by giving him the first professorship in law at the University of Pisa, where he was employed until his death in 1622.
