= Michael L. Klein =

American chemist (born 1940)

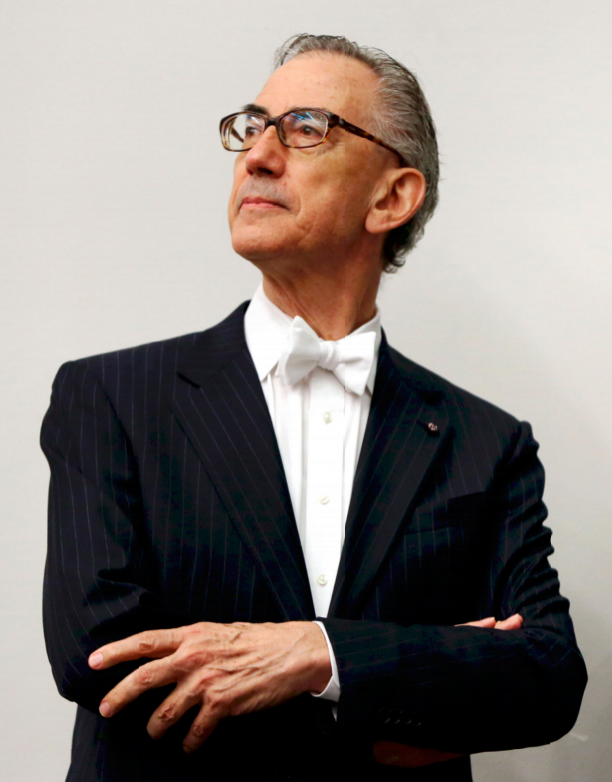
- Born: Michael Lawrence Klein; 13 March 1940 (age 86); London, England, United Kingdom
- Citizenship: United Kingdom; United States
- Education: University of Bristol (BSc, PhD)

Michael Lawrence Klein NAS (born March 13, 1940, in London, England) is an English-born American computational and physical chemist. He is the Laura H. Carnell Professor of Science and director of the Institute for Computational Molecular Science in the college of science and technology at Temple University in Philadelphia, US. He was previously the Hepburn Professor of Physical Science in the Center for Molecular Modeling at the University of Pennsylvania.

== Education and early life ==
Klein, a British native, was naturalized in the United States in 1993. Klein obtained a B.Sc. from the University of Bristol in 1961, followed by a Ph.D. in 1964. His research career includes the fields of chemistry and physics. Klein was a CIBA-Geigy Research Fellow of Physics at the University of Genoa in Italy from 1964-1965. Then went on to complete his chemistry research as an ICI Research Fellow at the University of Bristol from 1965-1967. His education and career then moved to the United States in 1967 where he served as a Research Associate of Physics at Rutgers University in New Jersey.

== Career ==
Klein was a researcher at the National Research Council of Canada from 1968-1987 and joined the faculty of the University of Pennsylvania in 1987. Klein's research in computational chemistry, particularly statistical mechanics, intermolecular interactions, and modeling of condensed phases and biophysical systems, is among the most highly cited in the field. He received the Aneesur Rahman prize in 1999, which is the highest honor given by the American Physical Society for work in computational physics, and was elected to the United States National Academy of Sciences in 2009.

== Research ==
Klein has advanced the field of computer simulation and modelling of molecular systems over a broad front. His early works focused on developing pragmatic intermolecular force fields to be used in computer simulation Monte Carlo and molecular dynamics (MD) simulations of molecular systems, such as water and aqueous solutions. During the 1980s and early 1990s, his group developed and elaborated algorithms and methodologies to enable the efficient and rigorous computer simulation of macromolecular systems. These seminal works have been influential and are very highly cited because of their broad utility. Every modern MD simulation code employs these algorithms in one form or other. Thus, modern molecular simulation studies of chemical systems ranging from surfactants to proteins and from lipid membranes to energy materials - including solid electrolyte fuel cells, and so-called “green” ionic liquids - take advantage of these algorithms. His pioneering simulation studies of surfactants, lipid membranes, and membrane-bound ion channels are noteworthy.

=== ISI ratings ===
Google Scholar lists more than 1,200 items (publications, abstracts, & reports), of which 730 have 10 or more citations each. Hirsch Index, h-index = 131. Total Citations exceed 128,000, increasing by about 7,000/year. His publication on Classical Monte Carlo simulations in The Journal of chemical physics has been cited over 44,000 times.

== Awards and honors ==
=== Memberships ===
- 2018 Elected Foreign Member: Chemical Sciences, Academia Europaea (MAE)
- 2015 Honorary Fellowship, JNCASR Bangalore India
- 2015 Elected Fellow, The American Association for Advancement of Science
- 2013 Honorary Fellow, Trinity College Cambridge UK
- 2009 International Review UK Chemistry Research Panel Chair
- 2008 Elected Fellow, The Chemical Research Society of India (CRSI)
- 2008 Fellow, The Mongolian National Academy of Sciences
- 2008 BESAC Sub-committee Member
- 2006 Elected Honorary Fellow, The Indian Academy of Sciences (IAS)
- 2006 Elected Honorary Member, The Materials Research Society of India (MRSI)
- 2004 Elected Fellow, The World Academy of Sciences (TWAS)
- 2003 Elected Fellow, The Royal Society of Chemistry UK (FRSC)
- 2003 Elected Fellow, The Institute of Physics, UK
- 2003 Elected Fellow, The Royal Society of London (FRS)
- 2003 Elected Member, The American Academy of Arts and Sciences
- 2002 International Review UK Chemical Sciences Panel Member
- 2001-2003 NSF Blue Ribbon Panel on Cyberinfrastructure Panel Member
- 1997 Honorary Fellow Sidney Sussex College, University of Cambridge UK
- 1991 Elected Fellow, The American Physical Society
- 1989 Guggenheim Fellow, University of Florence
- 1985 Fellow Commoner, Trinity College Cambridge UK
- 1984 Elected Fellow, The Royal Society of Canada (FRSC)
- 1979 Elected Fellow, The Chemical Institute of Canada
- 1970 IBM World Trade Fellow, San Jose, CA

=== Other awards and honors ===
- 2024 Sheikh Saud International Prize for Material Science
- 2020 John Scott Award & Medal
- 2017 Honorary D.Sc., University of St. Andrews, Scotland
- 2014 C.V. Raman Chair, The Indian Academy of Sciences
- 2013 Medal Lecturer, The World Academy of Sciences (TWAS)
- 2011 Boys – Rahman Medal, The Royal Society of Chemistry UK
- 2008 Peter Debye Award in Physical Chemistry, The American Chemical Society
- 2008 Hinshelwood Lectures, University of Oxford, UK
- 2004 CECAM Prize, The European Physical Society
- 2003 Schlumberger Visiting Professor, Universities of Oxford & Cambridge UK
- 1999 American Physical Society Award in Computational Physics
- 1997 Linnett Lectures University of Cambridge UK
- 1997 Miller Visiting Professor, University of California Berkeley
- 1995 Humboldt Research Award, MPI Stuttgart Germany
- 1988 Néel Visiting Professor, ENS Lyon France
- 1982 Visiting Professor, Australian National University, Canberra Australia
- 1982 JSPS Visiting Professor, University of Kyoto, Japan
- 1975 Visiting Professor, Université Paris VI France
