= Emanuele Papi =

Italian archaeologist

Emanuele Papi (30 August 1959) is an Italian classical archaeologist. He is professor of classical archaeology at the University of Siena, and professor of Roman archaeology at the Italian Archaeological School of Athens. His primary research interests are the topography of Ancient Rome, the archaeology of Roman Mediterranean provinces, and the economy and trade of Rome and the Roman Empire.

== Biography ==
He received his degree in Roman Archaeology at the University of Siena, and a doctorate at the University of Pisa, under the supervision of Andrea Carandini. He returned to the University of Siena in 1992 as researcher, associate professor (2002), and Professor in Classical Archaeology (since 2005). He was Director of the International PhD programme, Prehistory and Protohistory, History and Archaeology of the Ancient World and of the Ancient Societies of North Africa, Sahara and Mediterranean Levant Studies Centre, with B. Barich and M. de Vos Raaijmakers.

His first work was devoted to the archaeology and topography of ancient Rome and Roman Etruria. He was member of the editorial board of the Lexicon Topographicum Urbis Romae, edited by E. M. Steinby. He has excavated in North Africa, Egypt and Greece focussing on urban sites (Thamusida and Lixus in Morocco, Hephaistia on Lemnos and Dionysias in the Faiyum).

In Rome, he excavated with Andrea Carandini (northern slopes of the Palatine), in Siena (Hospital of Santa Maria della Scala), and in Bomarzo with J. Th. Peña and in collaboration with the American Academy in Rome. He is a member of the editorial board of the journals Workshop for Classical Archaeology, Facta, Annals of the Faculty of Arts, University of Siena.

At present Papi is overseeing archaeological missions in Greece, Morocco and Egypt.

== Research outline ==
Main research areas:

Archeology and topography of ancient Rome
Instrumentum domesticum the Roman and Late Antiquity
Ancient Mediterranean Archaeology
Economy and commerce of Rome and the Roman Empire
Society of the Roman Empire border
Colonial Archaeology

Research projects under way:

Since 1999 archaeological research at Thamusida (Sidi Ali ben Ahmed, Morocco)
Since 2002 archaeological research at Hephaestia (Lemnos, Greece)
2009: Archaeological research in Dionysias (Qaroun Qasr, Egypt)
Since 2010: archaeological research at Lixus (Larache Morocco)
Since 2012: research on oil mills late antique and Byzantine Athens
Since 2013: restoration and enhancement of the medersa of Chellah (Rabat) and the "Palais de Gordien" Volubilis (Morocco)
From 2013: archeology and archeometria of food production in the Eastern Mediterranean society in Roman and Byzantine times
