= Domenico Prattichizzo =

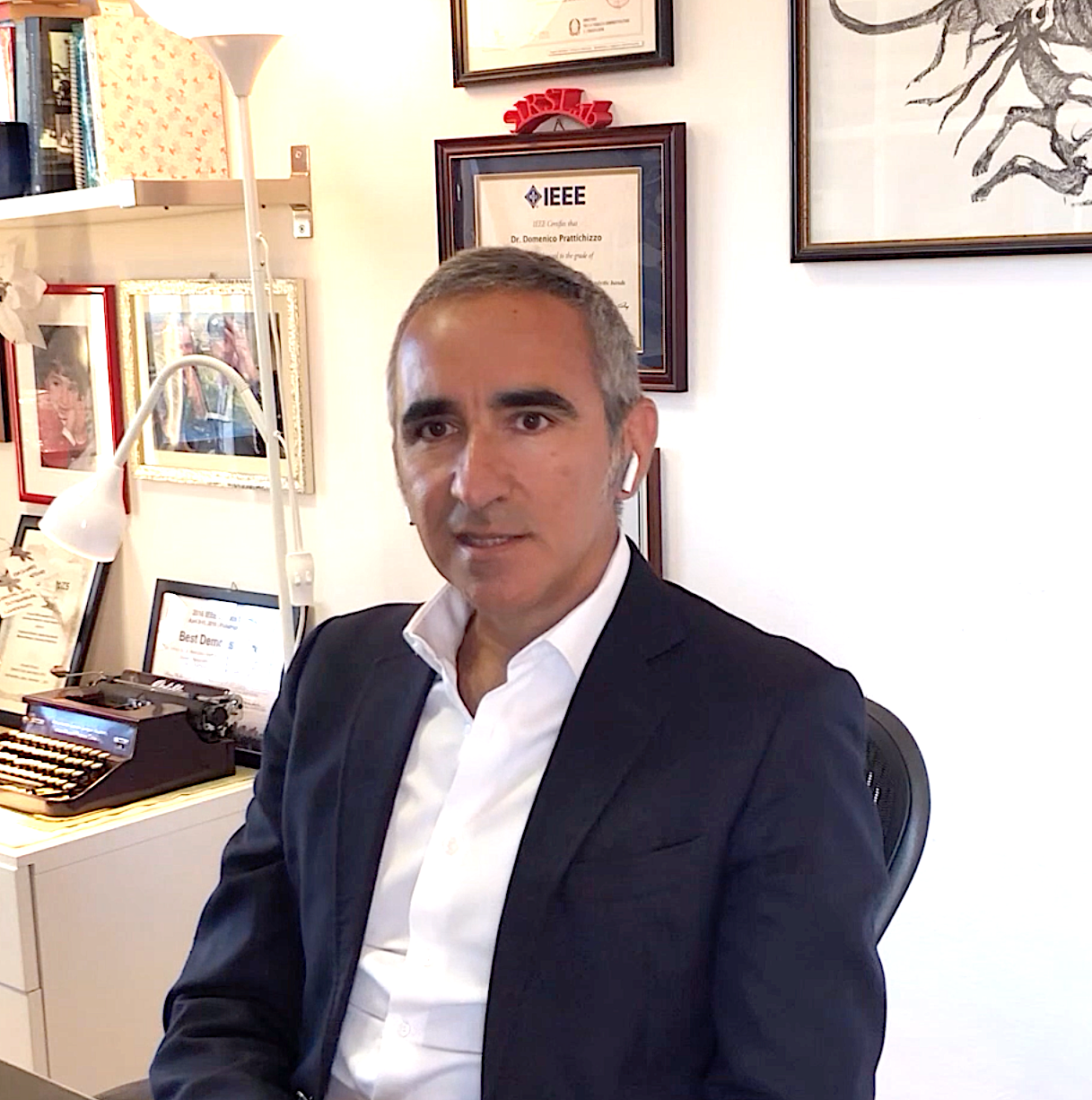
- Prattichizzo in 2018
- Born: May 19, 1965 (age 61); San Severo, Foggia, Italy
- Education: University of Pisa
- Scientific career
- Fields: Robotics
- Workplaces: University of Siena; Istituto Italiano di Tecnologia

Domenico Prattichizzo is an Italian scientist with a strong and international recognized expertise in the fields of haptics, robotics, and wearable technology. His researches find their main applications in virtual and augmented reality scenarios and in the rehabilitation of people with upper and lower limbs, visual and cognitive impairments.

He is Full Professor of Robotics and Automation at University of Siena, Senior Scientist at Istituto Italiano di Tecnologia in Genoa and co-founder of WEART, a startup on Wearable Haptics and Tactile Communication.

He has been elevated Fellow of the Institute of Electrical and Electronics Engineers (IEEE) in 2016 for contributions to haptics and multi-fingered robotic hands.

== Education ==
In 1991 he obtained the Master of Science in Electronic Engineering at University of Pisa. In 1994–1995 he has been Visiting Scientist at the Artificial Intelligence Lab of the Massachusetts Institute of Technology in Cambridge, MA, USA and in 1995 he got the PhD in Robotics and Automation at University of Pisa.

== Research ==
Prattichizzo has contributed and is particularly active in the fields of haptics and robotics with a special focus on wearable technology, human–robot interaction, rehabilitation robotics, virtual reality, augmented reality.

From 2013 to 2017 he has been the coordinator of the EU FP7 Collaborative Project "WEARHAP: WEARable HAPtics for Humans and Robots", involving 11 European research centers.

In addition he led the research unit in several H2020 and FP7 EU projects ("SoftPro: Synergy-based Open-source Foundations and Technologies for Prosthetics and RehabilitatiOn", "SoMa: Soft-bodied intelligence for Manipulation", "ACANTO: A CyberphysicAl social NeTwOrk using robot friends", "DALi: Devices for Assisted Living", "THE: The Hand Embodied", "ECHORD-European Clearing House for Open Robotics Development", "ROBOCAST: ROBot and SENSors INtegration as Guidance FOR Enhanced Computer Assisted Surgery and Therapy") and international projects (2015 Intuitive Surgical Technology Research Grant "Comparison of cutaneous feedback methods for pinching palpation in robotic surgery", 2014 Mathworks Education Award for developing the MOOC "The Art of Grasping and Manipulation in Robotics", 2007 IEEE RAS New Initiative Grants "Establishing IEEE/RAS Points of Presence and Initiatives in Second Life".)

He coordinated "Remotouch", selected as one of the projects to represent Innovation Italy at Expo 2010 Shanghai China within the program "Italia degli Innovatori".

He is author of more than 500 peer-reviewed papers in the areas of robotics, haptics, human–robot interaction.

The outcomes of his research generated several patents.

== Scientific leadership ==
He is president of the Eurohaptics Society, and a Member of the Technical Board of ARTES 4.0, advanced robotics and enabling digital technologies & systems.

He co-authored and published a 2020 book Augmenting Human Manipulation Abilities with Supernumerary Robotic Limbs. In 2019 he was co-founder of I-RIM, the Institute for Robotics and Intelligent Machines, an Italian foundation created to offer an organizational reference for its members and stakeholders, and to interact with public institutions on the topics of Robotics and Intelligent Machines. He has been chair of the IEEE RAS Italian Chapter from 2006 to 2010, awarded with the RAS Chapter of the Year Award in 2009.

From January 2020 he is editor in chief of the journal IEEE Transactions on Haptics. From 2007 to 2013 he served as Co-Editor in Chief for the IEEE Transactions on Haptics.

He is currently an associate editor of the journal Frontiers in Robotics and AI, section biomedical robotics.

He has been appointed as area chair of the conference Robotics Science and Systems (RSS) in 2014 and 2015, and as chair and plenary/keynote speaker in many international conferences.
