= Antonio Giordano =

Italian-American oncologist (born 1962)

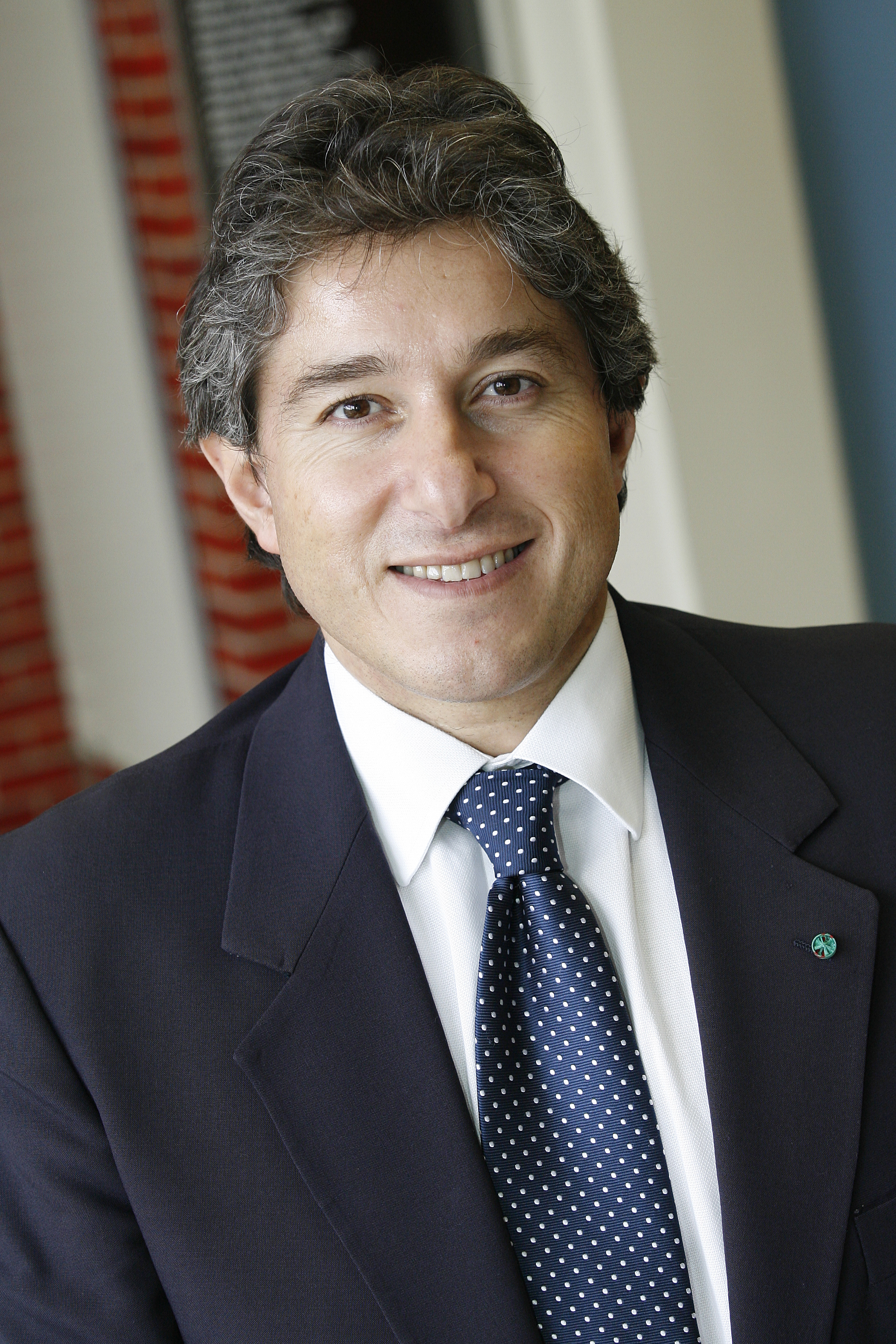
- Antonio Giordano in 2007
- Born: October 11, 1962 (age 64); Naples, Campania, Italy
- Citizenship: Italian and American
- Education: University of Naples Federico II
- Awards: Knight and Commander of Order of Merit of the Italian Republic; Cross of Merit Melitense from Sovereign Military Order of Malta
- Scientific career
- Fields: Oncology
- Workplaces: Sbarro Institute, Temple University; University of Siena

Antonio Giordano (born October 11, 1962) is an Italian-American oncologist, pathologist, geneticist, researcher, and professor. He is the Director of the Sbarro Institute for Cancer Research and Molecular Medicine in Philadelphia and a Professor of Anatomy and Pathological Histology in the Department of Medical Biotechnology at the University of Siena.

Giordano has received international awards for his work and has held academic appointments at Temple University, Thomas Jefferson University, and the University of Siena.

== Early life & education ==
Antonio Giordano is the son of Giovan Giacomo Giordano (1925–2010), an oncologist and pathologist, and Maria Teresa Sgambati. He earned his medical degree from the University of Naples Federico II in 1986 and completed his specialization in Anatomy and Pathological Histology at the University of Trieste.

Giordano relocated to the United States to pursue doctoral studies under the mentorship of Nobel laureate James Dewey Watson at Cold Spring Harbor Laboratory. During his tenure, Giordano published research linking cell cycle regulation to cancer development, proposing that oncogenes interacting directly with cyclins may contribute to cell cycle deregulation and the development of a neoplastic phenotype.

== Career ==
In 1992, he moved to Philadelphia, where he served as an assistant professor at Temple University and later as a full professor at Thomas Jefferson University. Since 2004, Giordano has been a professor of Anatomy and Pathological Histology at the University of Siena and directs the Sbarro Institute for Cancer Research and Molecular Medicine and the Center for Biotechnology in the College of Science and Technology at Temple University.

=== Research ===
In 1993, Giordano identified and cloned the tumor suppressor gene Rb2/p130, which plays a key role in the cell cycle by controlling DNA replication. This gene's role in cell cycle regulation and its potential in cancer prevention have been established. Mutations in this gene may contribute to uncontrolled neoplastic cell proliferation.

In 2000, Giordano led an in vivo gene therapy study using a mouse model with an induced lung tumor. The study reported significant tumor growth reduction following a single injection of Rb2/p130 delivered via a retrovirus vector.

In 2001, Giordano led another study into tumor pathogenesis using a mouse model. The research demonstrated that Rb2/p130 also functions as an inhibitor of angiogenesis — the formation of new blood vessels supporting tumor growth. Additionally, two regulators of the human genome, CDK9 and CDK10, were identified.

In 2004, Giordano's research team at Temple University identified Novel Structure Proteins (NSPs), protein structures potentially involved in nuclear dynamics during cell division. One isoform, NSP5a3a, is highly expressed in certain tumor cell lines and may serve as a tumor marker.

In late 2024, a research team led by Giordano and Luigi Alfano published a study in the International Journal of Molecular Sciences titled "Oleanolic Acid Modulates DNA Damage Response to Camptothecin, Increasing Cancer Cell Death," which reported that combining oleanolic acid with chemotherapy enhanced the death of cancer cells.

=== Publications ===
Giordano has published scientific articles and two books on environmental health, including Campania, terra di Veleni and Monnezza di Stato, published respectively by Denaro Libri and Minerva.

He launched a petition calling for environmental protection, reportedly signed by more than 500 researchers and professionals, and has promoted initiatives focused on environmental and public health. Giordano served as the Technical Consultant to the Public Prosecutor's Office of Avellino for the Iso Chimica case and Scientific Director of the Mediterranea - Food and Wine Academy of Naples. He has also conducted studies on the potential anticancer effects of tomatoes.

He authored the Veritas pilot study, which investigated the link between disease onset and exposure to environmental pollutants. In 2024, he published a paper in the journal Environments titled "Understanding Environmental Contamination Through the Lens of the Peregrine Falcon," discussing the use of peregrine falcons as bioindicators of pollution.

Giordano has published over 600 scientific articles in peer-reviewed journals and holds international patents relating to gene discoveries and cancer research.

== Selected publications ==
- Campania, terra di Veleni, Giulio Taro (coauthor), Napoli, Denaro Libri, 2011, ISBN 978-88-7444-067-2.
- Monnezza di Stato. Le Terre dei Fuochi nell'Italia dei Veleni, Paolo Chiariello (coauthor), Bologna, Minerva Edizioni, 2013, ISBN 978-88-7381-750-5.
- Cell Cycle and Cancer, Springer, 2013, ISBN 978-1-4614-5697-7.

== Honors and awards ==
- Member of the Union League of Philadelphia
- Knight and Commander of the Order of Merit of the Italian Republic
- Cross of Merit Melitense from the Sovereign Military Order of Malta
- Member of the Accademia dei Georgofili
- Member of the New York Academy of Sciences
- Honorary doctorate from the International University in Havana, Cuba
