= Carlo Bellieni =

Italian neonatologist and bioethicist

Carlo V. Bellieni (Siena, Italy, born 1962) is an Italian neonatologist and bioethicist. He served as Secretary of the Bioethics Committee of the Italian Pediatrics Society. He is a member of the ethical board of the Siena Biotech research facility and the Ethical Board of the Siena University Hospital where he directs the neonatal intensive therapy unit. He follows the empirical approach in bioethics, which emphasizes realism, reason, and empathy. Bellieni authored numerous clinical research papers in international scientific journals, and several books on neonatal pain and bioethics.

== Studies on infant pain ==
Bellieni created and developed a new method of nonpharmacological analgesia called "sensorial saturation", based on the simultaneous administration of gentle stimuli (touch, taste and voice) to the baby during a painful procedure. This method is reported among the most effective for pain in babies. Bellieni also performed studies on babies' crying and developing a pain scale based on acoustical analysis of crying.

Bellieni performed several analyses on babies' crying and showed that it is not useful to detect the cause that provoked it; nonetheless, it contain a sort of protolanguage, namely the patterns of crying change dramatically when it exceeds a certain pain threshold.

== Studies on crying and weeping ==
Bellieni analysed weeping behavior and concluded that most animals can cry, but only humans have psychoemotional tears, also known as weeping. Weeping induces empathy perhaps with the mediation of the mirror neurons network and influences mood through hormone release elicited by tears' massage effect on cheeks or through relief from sobbing rhythm.

== Laughter ==
Laughter is a form of alarm siren that informs bystanders a worrying event is over. According to Bellieni's studies, the characteristic worrying event is finding a "stiff" behavior within a "fluid" one: this contrast frightens us, and finding it resolved is a sudden joy that can be communicated to others. Laughter is rhythmic because it should have features of a real alarm siren to share this ceased alarm.
