= Meloria =

Island

Meloria shoal
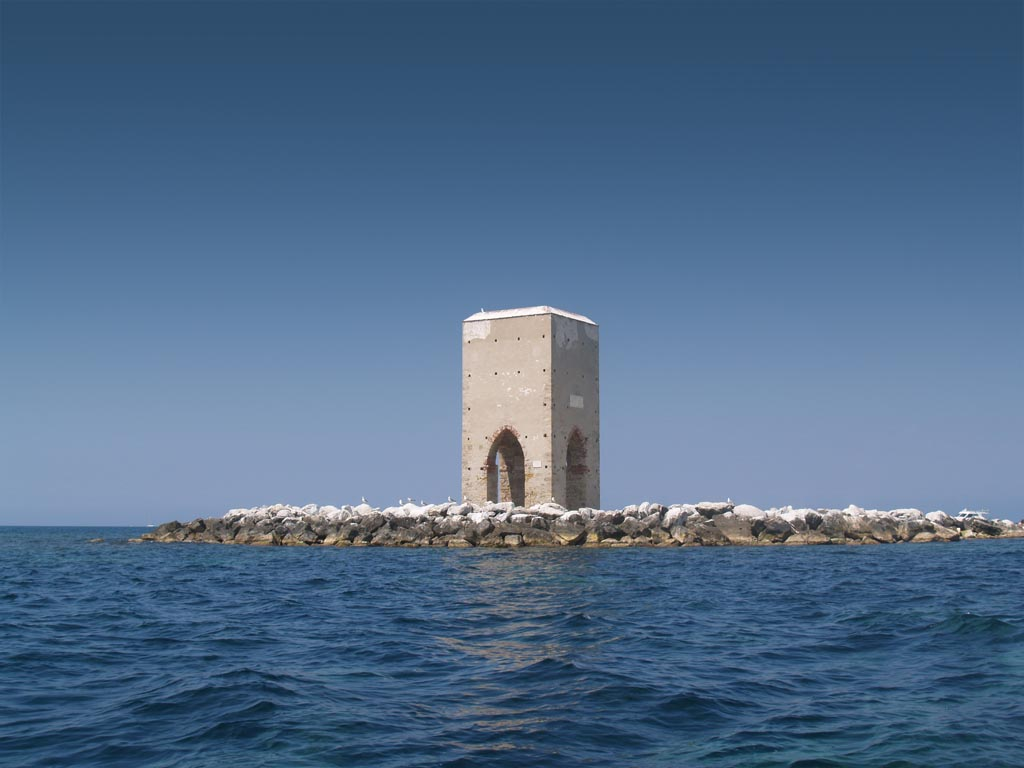
- The tower of Meloria

- Location within Tuscany

Geography
- Location: Ligurian Sea
- Coordinates: 43°32′53″N 10°13′09″E
- Archipelago: Tuscan Archipelago
- Total islands: 2

Administration
- Italy
- Region: Tuscany
- Province: Livorno
- Comune: Livorno

Demographics
- Population: uninhabited

Meloria is a rocky skerry, surrounded by a shoal, off the Tuscan coast, in the Ligurian Sea, 6.1 kilometres (3.8 mi) north-west of Livorno.

== Meloria shoal ==
The Meloria shoal is an attractive archaeological, naturalistic and historical region that makes part, since 2010, of the Area Marina Protetta Secche della Meloria (Meloria shoal Marine Protected Area) assigned to the Parco naturale di Migliarino, San Rossore, Massaciuccoli (Natural Park of Migliarino, San Rossore, Massaciuccoli) for the management. The shoal is formed by a rocky bank surrounded by shallow water sandy and muddy of the surface of 9,372 hectare extending up to 12 km offshore. The seabed varies from 2 meters to 30 meters and the habitat is an alternating of rocky areas with characteristic basins seabed with prairies of Posidonia. The sea flora consists mainly of Posidonia and Caulerpa racemosa while the fauna has a rich variety as: Symphodus roissali, Serranus cabrilla, Scorpaena scrofa, Muraena helena, Coris julis, Aphia minuta, Pelagia noctiluca and others. Geologically the Meloria consists of a calcareous sandstone bench corresponding to an active undersea fault called Rift of Meloria which caused numerous local earthquakes up to 3,5 in the Richter magnitude scale.

== Meloria Tower ==
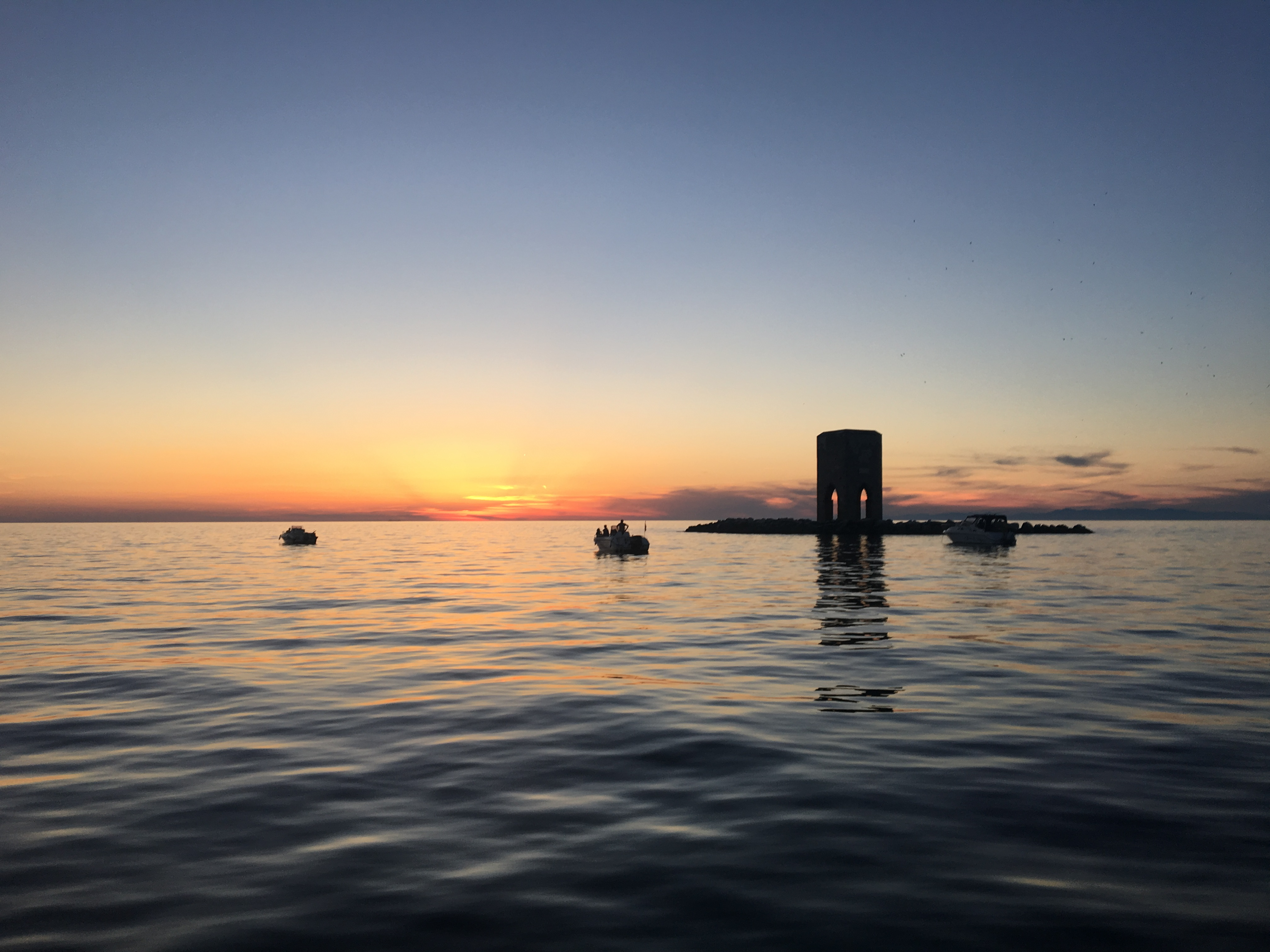
Meloria tower at sunset

In 1157, the Pisans built a lighthouse on a surfacing rock of the Meloria shoal in order to avoid the wrecking of the ships directed to Porto Pisano. It was decided to keep a navigational light, and the task was given to the Augustinian monks of the hermitage of San Jacopo in Acquaviva by Livorno and a written agreement signed for the work.

The tower was destroyed by the Genoese. A second tower was built in 1598 on order of Ferdinando I de' Medici, Grand Duke of Tuscany, but it was since destroyed by the bad weather. The current tower was built in 1709 by Cosimo III de' Medici and has a characteristic form; it is formed by four quadrangular pillars connected by Gothic arches, above which the tower rides 15 meters high. The tower was built on the pillars to allow the flow of the waves, but had no signalling light. On the south side of the tower is the Latin inscription: “Pro navigntium securitate ad latentes copulo evitandos” (For the sailors' safety pay attention to the reef). In 1986 the tower underwent to a complete renovation.

== Meloria lighthouses ==
There are active lighthouses at both ends of the Meloria shoal: the Meloria north end Lighthouse (built in 1958) and the Meloria south end Lighthouse (built in 1867).

== Meloria Naval battles ==
=== First Battle of Meloria ===
The first Battle of Meloria, on May 3, 1241, was fought between the fleet of the emperor Frederick II, in alliance with Pisa, against a Genoese squadron and ended with a Pisan and Imperial victory.

=== Second Battle of Meloria ===
The second battle, fought on Sunday August 6, 1284, was of higher historical importance. Usually, Battle of Meloria refers to this battle. It was a typical medieval sea-fight, and accomplished the ruin of Pisa as a naval power, in favour of Genoa.

== Meloria air crash ==
On 9 November 1971, a Royal Air Force Lockheed Hercules C.1 crashed into the sea off the coast of Livorno on the Meloria shoal, killing all 46 passengers and 6 crew. At the time it was described by Italian officials as the worst military air disaster in Italy in peacetime.

== See also ==
- Battle of Meloria
- Tuscan Archipelago
