= Auser =

Auser may refer to:

- Autogestione servizi SPI, an Italian association for the self-employed formally associated with the Italian General Confederation of Labour (CGIL)
- the Latin name of the river Serchio, in the Italian region of Tuscany
