= Lago di Bientina =

Former lake in Tuscany, Italy

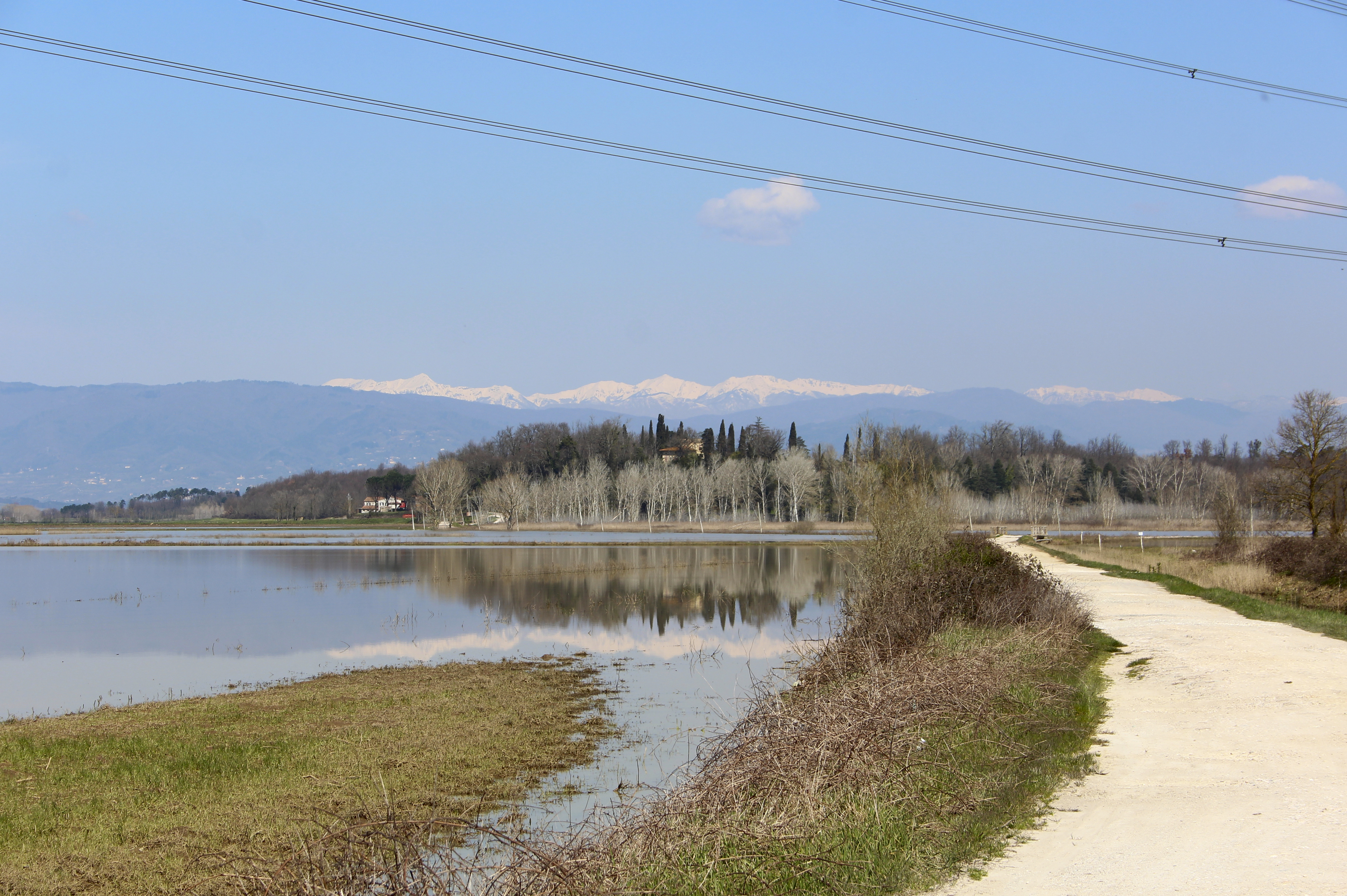
- View of the former lakebed during a flood

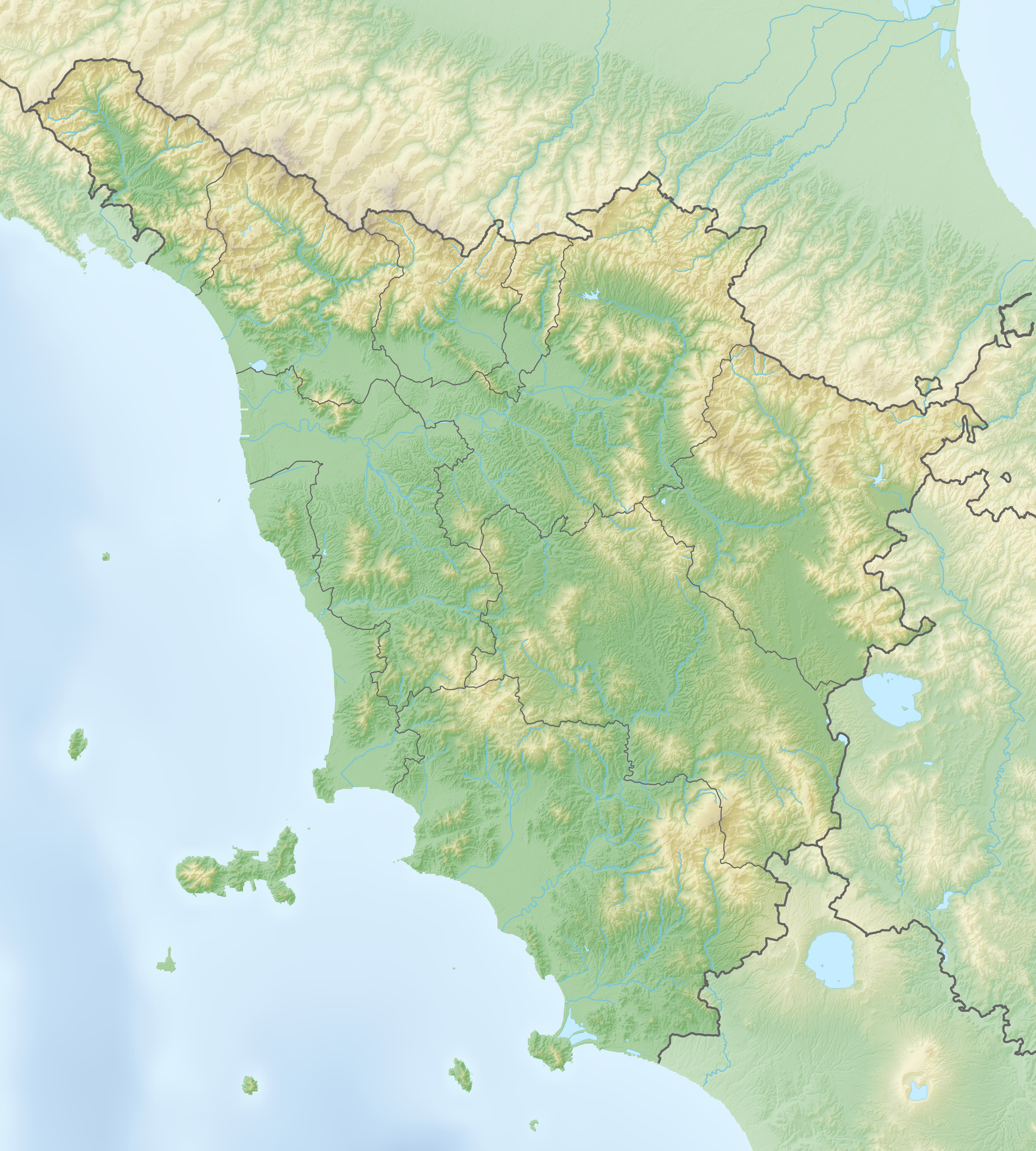
- Location within Tuscany
- Location: Province of Lucca, Province of Pisa, Tuscany
- Coordinates: 43.75°N 10.64°E
- Primary inflows: River Auser
- Primary outflows: Canale Imperiale
- Basin countries: Italy
- Surface area: 36 km^{2} (14 sq mi)

Lago di Bientina, also known as Lago di Sesto, was a lake in Tuscany, Italy. Located to the north of the town of Bientina, between Lucca and Pisa, the lake was historically subject to numerous efforts at drainage due to its tendency to flood. Early attempts at canal-building and drainage in the 16th century were hampered by the lake's connection with the Arno River, which often led to backflow and even increased flooding.

In the 19th century, by order of Grand Duke Leopold II, the lake was fully reclaimed and converted to farmland. Before drainage, it was the largest lake in Tuscany. The former lake-bed is drained by a series of canals, which flow through a channel called La Botte ('The Barrel') underneath the Arno River before emptying into the Canale Imperiale ('Imperial Canal'), and, subsequently, the Ligurian Sea.

== Geography ==
The lake lay in a broad valley between two sets of hills, the Monte Pisano to the west and the Monte Carlo to the east. From antiquity, Lago di Bientina had two sections – a large area of permanent water towards the north, known as the Chiaro, and a marshy area towards the south that drained in the dry season, known as the Padule. Due to the shallowness of the valley, Lago di Bientina's size varied widely from season to season, from 16 km^{2} (6.2 sq mi) during times of severe drought to 96 km^{2} (37 sq mi) during floods. At its average area of 36 km^{2} (14 sq mi), it was the largest lake in Tuscany.

The lake was fed from the north by the Serchio River, also known as the Auser. At the southern end, the Padule led to several outflows that fed into a small river called the Serezza, which flowed into the Arno River several kilometres further downstream, and subsequently into the Ligurian Sea.

== Early history (to 1559) ==
Several Etruscan tombs have been found in the area which was once covered by the lake, indicating that it may have been at a low level in ancient times. The earliest references to the existence of a lake north of Bientina date back to the 7th century AD. There exist stories of a Roman city named Sextum which was submerged to form the lake, but there is no documentary evidence of the existence of this city. However, it is believed that the Romans built canals to encourage the lake's outward flow and the level of the lake was probably low during the Roman period.

Along the shores of the lake throughout the medieval period was the Abbey of San Salvatore near the town of Sesto. First recorded in the mid-8th century, the Abbey was granted royal immunity by the Holy Roman Emperor Otto III in 996 AD. It controlled widely scattered lands as far as Corsica. However, fishing rights in the lake, especially in the marshy Padule, were controlled by the town of Bientina. Throughout the Renaissance and Enlightenment period, the Lago di Bientina marked the boundary between the city-state of Lucca and the Republic of Florence, later replaced by the Duchy of Tuscany.

== Drainage efforts (1560–1859) ==
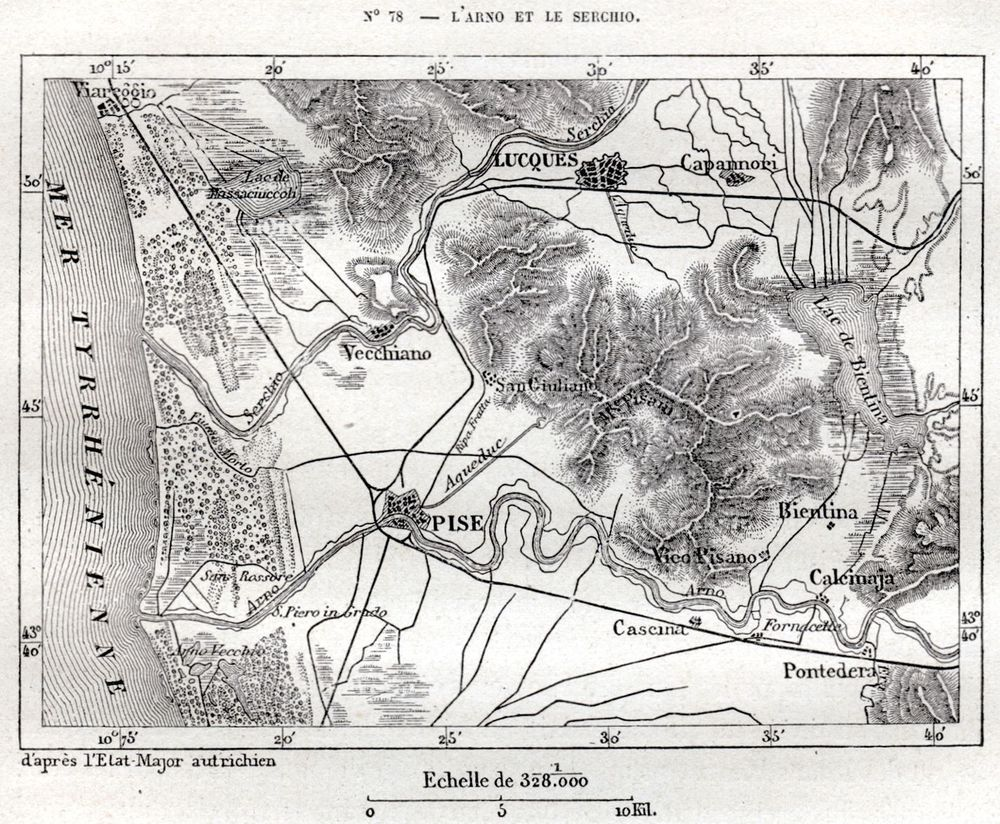
Map of Lago di Bientina and surrounding area in the early 1800s, before drainage

Due to regular flooding and the fact that the marshy Padule was associated with malaria, discussions regarding improving the drainage of the lake began in the 1500s. In 1560, Cosimo III, a Medici Grand Duke of Florence, agreed with the government of Lucca to dig a new, broader channel for the Serezza, the lake's southern outflow to the Arno. This work was completed in August 1562, lowering the level of the lake considerably and opening thousands of acres for cultivation. Afterwards, the prior channel of the Serezza was known as the Serezza Vecchia ('Old Serezza'), and closed off. Due to later modifications made to the course of the Arno river, however, the new canal rapidly lost effectiveness and the Old Serezza had to be reopened.

By the 18th century, the population of Tuscany had grown considerably and attention was again given to the project of draining the Lago di Bientina in order to increase the amount of available farmland. Under the direction of Grand Duke Francesco di Lorena, several more channels were dug from the lake to the Arno, designed by engineer and mathematician Leonardo Ximenes. These efforts were spurred on by serious flooding around the lake in 1768, which prompted the Lucchese government to create a commission to address the issue. However, when the Arno flooded, as it did frequently at that time, these channels were liable to backflow and sometimes even led to increased flooding in the area around Lago di Bientina.

At this time the lake was well known for its eels and its large population of waterfowl, especially coots. In 1837, continued disputes between the Lucchese and Florentine governments over fishing rights led the people of Lucca to suggest building a wall to divide the lake in two, but this was never carried out due to its marked impracticality.

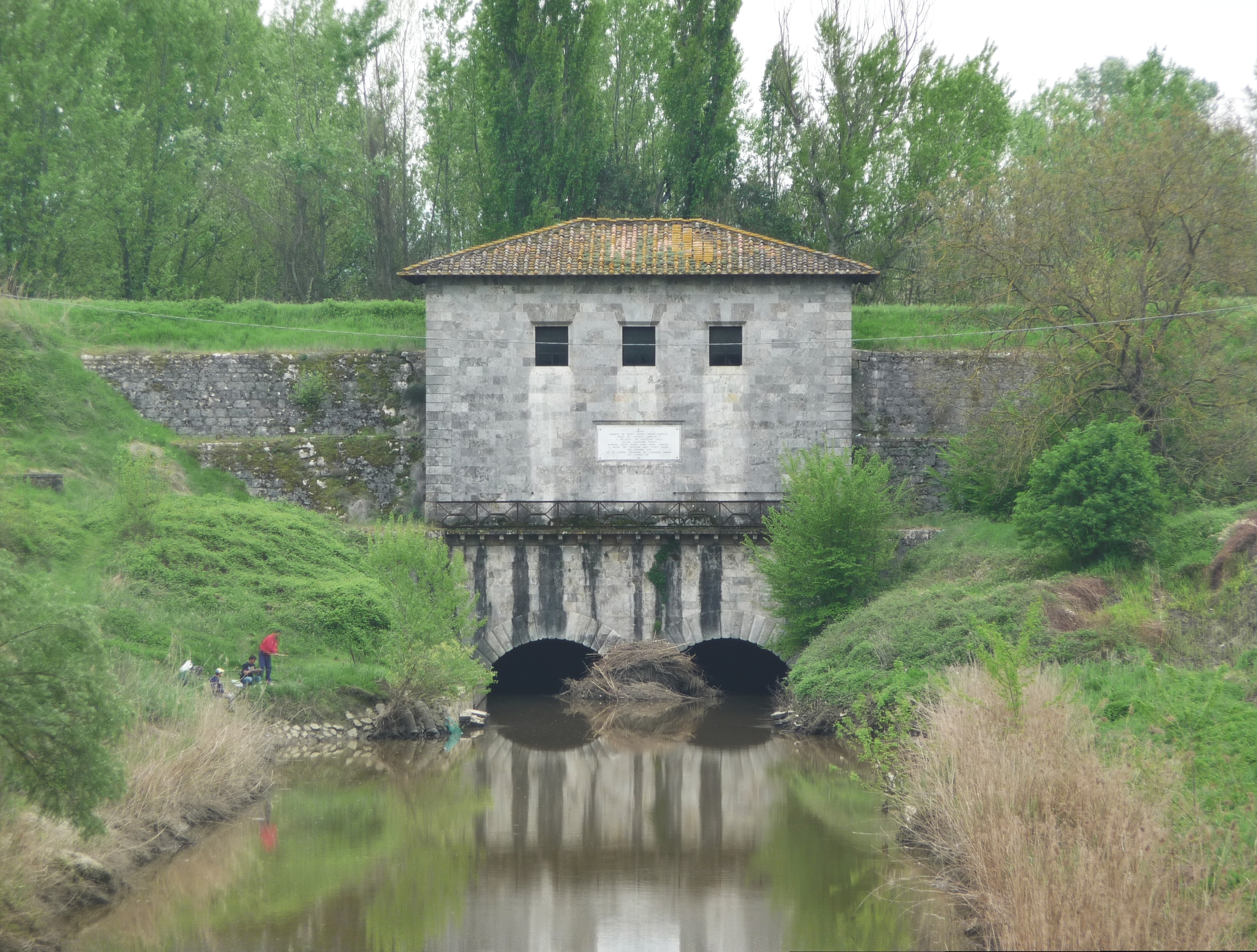
Contemporary view of La Botte, which carries the waters of the Bientina valley under the Arno

In 1852, the Grand Duke Leopold II ordered the construction of a "barrel" or channel beneath the Arno to convey the waters of the Lago di Bientina directly to the sea. This idea had been first proposed in 1699 by an engineer named Ciaccheri, but had not been carried out due to the high cost. Between 1852 and 1859 a new canal, the Canale Imperiale, was dug under the leadership of the engineer Alessandro Manetti. The channel known as La Botte was constructed beneath the Arno, consisting of a double-barreled siphon 250 meters long which was inaugurated in December 1859. This largely completed the draining of the Lago di Bientina, circumventing the troublesome Arno altogether and draining the valley of the Lago di Bientina directly to the Ligurian Sea.

== Post-drainage history (1860–present) ==
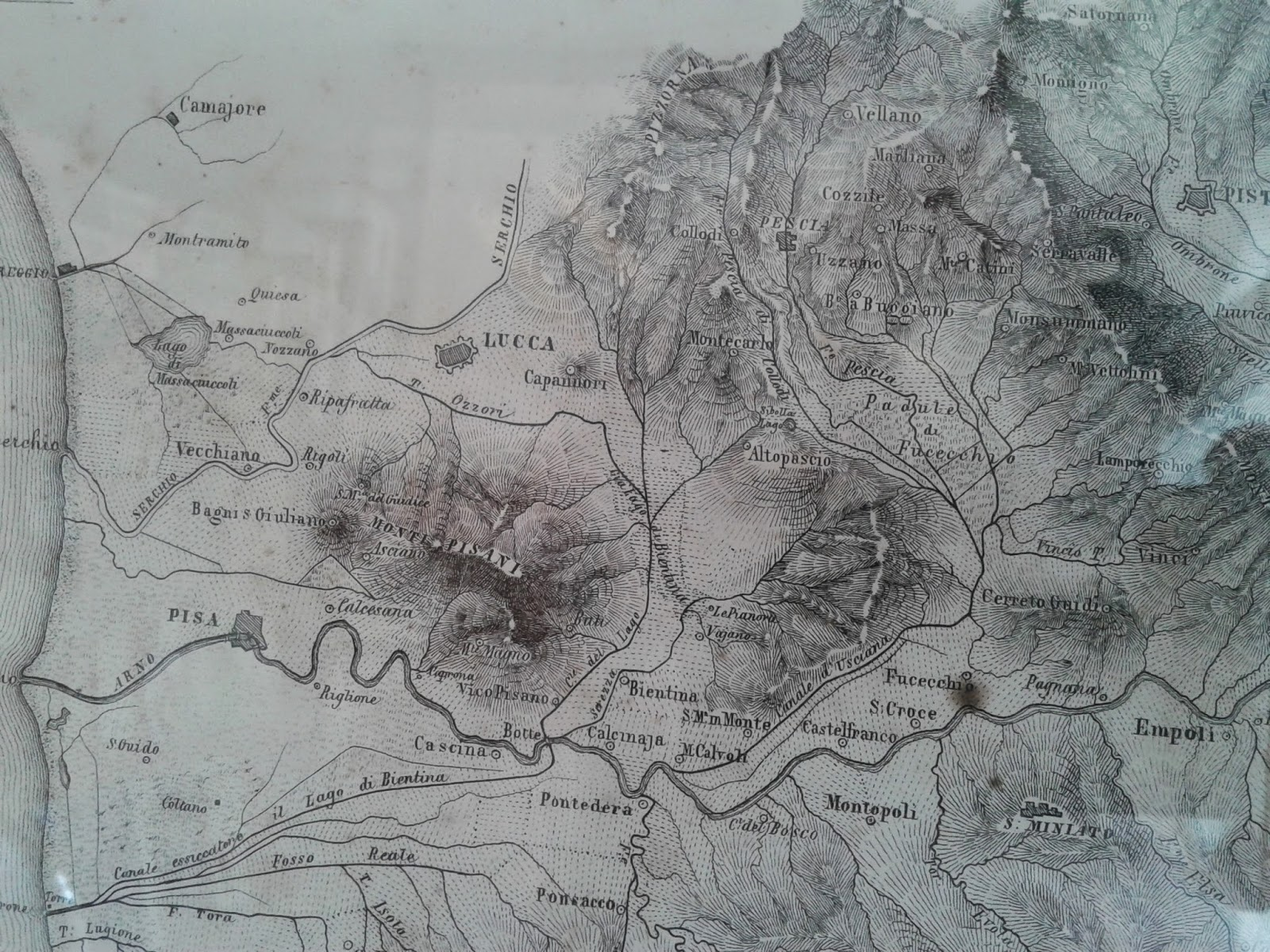
Map of former Lago di Bientina and surrounding area in the late 1800s, after drainage, showing canals and La Botte

The drained land was converted to farmland and divided among tenant farmers around the time of Italian unification. However, as the years passed, the efficiency of the drainage system began to decrease due to leaks and mechanical failures, and by 1907 it was necessary to set up a commission to install mechanical pumps to ensure the continued drainage of the former area of Lago di Bientina. Between 1915 and 1930, additional work was done to widen and deepen the canals leading from the region towards La Botte and the drainage under the Arno.

Degradation of the drainage system was hastened by the post-war development of industry and an increase in civil discharge in the region, and by 1967 the area was in danger of reverting to marsh. This situation was considered untenable due to the large population and substantial industry supported in the former lakebed. A plan was developed to maintain the reclamation of the lake-bed of the Lago di Bientina and was presented to the Ministry of Agriculture and Forestry in 1974. However, this plan was not fully carried out, and the area, primarily farmland, still experiences regular flooding after heavy rains. In the dry season, however, the only trace of the lake is found in the canals of the region and a small hill in the center of the plain, which was previously an island called Isola di San Benedetto (St. Benedict's Island).
