= Meloria north end Lighthouse =

Meloria north end
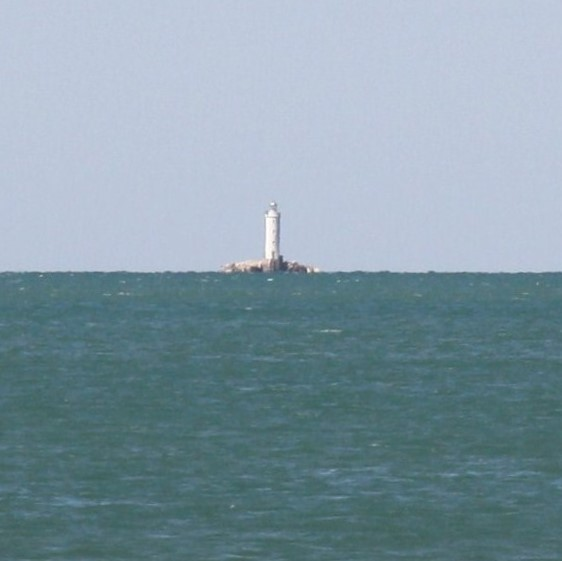
- Meloria north end Lighthouse
- Location: Livorno; Tuscany; Italy
- Coordinates: 43°35′24″N 10°12′42″E

Tower
- Constructed: 1958 (current)
- Foundation: concrete base
- Construction: concrete and brick tower
- Height: 20 metres (66 ft)
- Shape: cylindrical tower with lantern and gallery
- Markings: white tower
- Power source: solar power
- Operator: Marina Militare

Light
- Focal height: 18 metres (59 ft)
- Lens: Type TD
- Intensity: LABI 100 W
- Range: 10 nautical miles (19 km; 12 mi)
- Characteristic: Fl (2) W 10s.
- Italy no.: 1884 E.F

Meloria north end Lighthouse (Italian: Faro Nord delle Secche della Meloria) is an active lighthouse located in the Ligurian Sea, 7.5 nautical miles (13.9 km; 8.6 mi) north of Meloria south end Lighthouse and 7.5 nautical miles (13.9 km; 8.6 mi) north west of Livorno, in the northern part of the Meloria shoal.

== Description ==
The lighthouse is a cylindrical tower built on the north extremity of Meloria shoal in 1958 in white concrete; it is 20 metres (66 ft) high with lantern and balcony. The lighthouse is powered by solar power unit and the lantern emits two white flash in a ten seconds period visible up to 10 nautical miles (19 km; 12 mi). The light is operated by the Marina Militare and it is identified by the code number 1884 E.F.

== See also ==
- List of lighthouses in Italy
- Meloria south end Lighthouse
