= Avane, Vecchiano =

Avane
- Frazione
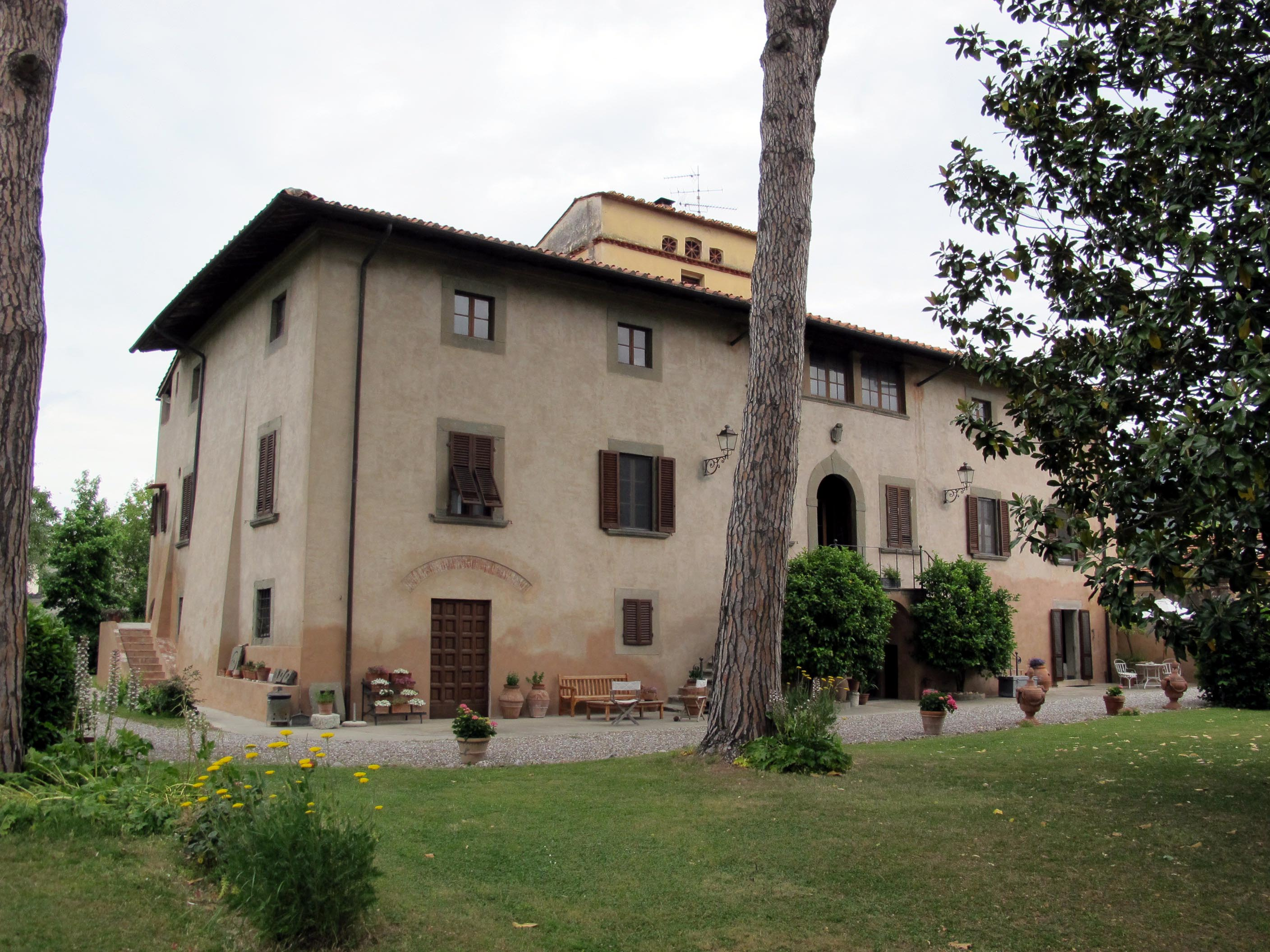
- Villa Gentili in Avane

- Location of Avane in Italy
- Coordinates: 43°47′22″N 10°24′31″E
- Country: Italy
- Region: Tuscany
- Province: Pisa (PI)
- Comune: Vecchiano
- Elevation: 6 m (20 ft)

Population (2011)
  - Total: 1,157
- Demonym: Avanesi
- Time zone: UTC+1 (CET)
  - Summer (DST): UTC+2 (CEST)
- Postal code: 56019
- Dialing code: (+39) 050

Avane is a village in Tuscany, central Italy, administratively a frazione of the comune of Vecchiano, province of Pisa. At the time of the 2001 census its population was 1,020.

Avane is about 9 km (5.6 mi) from Pisa and 3 km (1.9 mi) from Vecchiano.
