= Battle of Meloria (1284) =

Naval battle between Pisa and Genoa

- Part of the Genoese-Pisan Wars
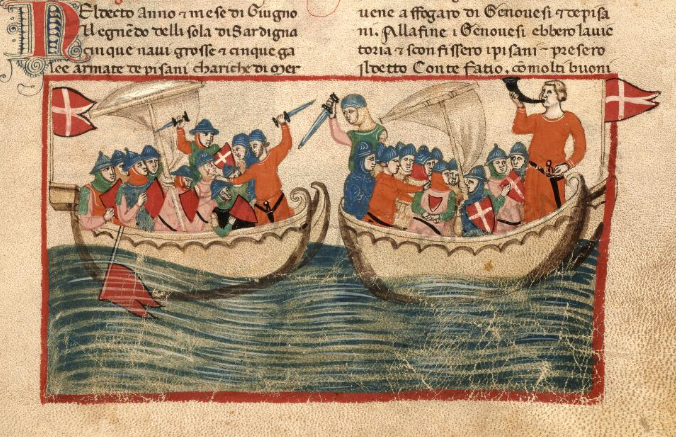
- Miniature of the battle of Meloria; Nuova Cronica Vatican Library Chig.L.VIII.296
Date	August 6, 1284
Location	Islet of Meloria, Ligurian Sea 43°32′53″N 10°13′09″E
Result	Genoese victory

Belligerents
Republic of Genoa	Republic of Pisa

Commanders and leaders
Oberto Doria; Benedetto Zaccaria; Corrado Spinola	Albertino Morosini (POW); Count Ugolino; Andreotto Saraceno

Strength
88 galleys	72 galleys

Casualties and losses
Doria calls the losses of the Genoese moderate	~5,000 killed ~9,000–11,000 captured 35–37 galleys lost

The Battle of Meloria was fought near the islet of Meloria in the Ligurian Sea on 5 and 6 August 1284 between the fleets of the Republics of Genoa and Pisa as part of the Genoese-Pisan War. The victory of Genoa and the destruction of the Pisan fleet marked the decline of the Republic of Pisa.

== Background ==
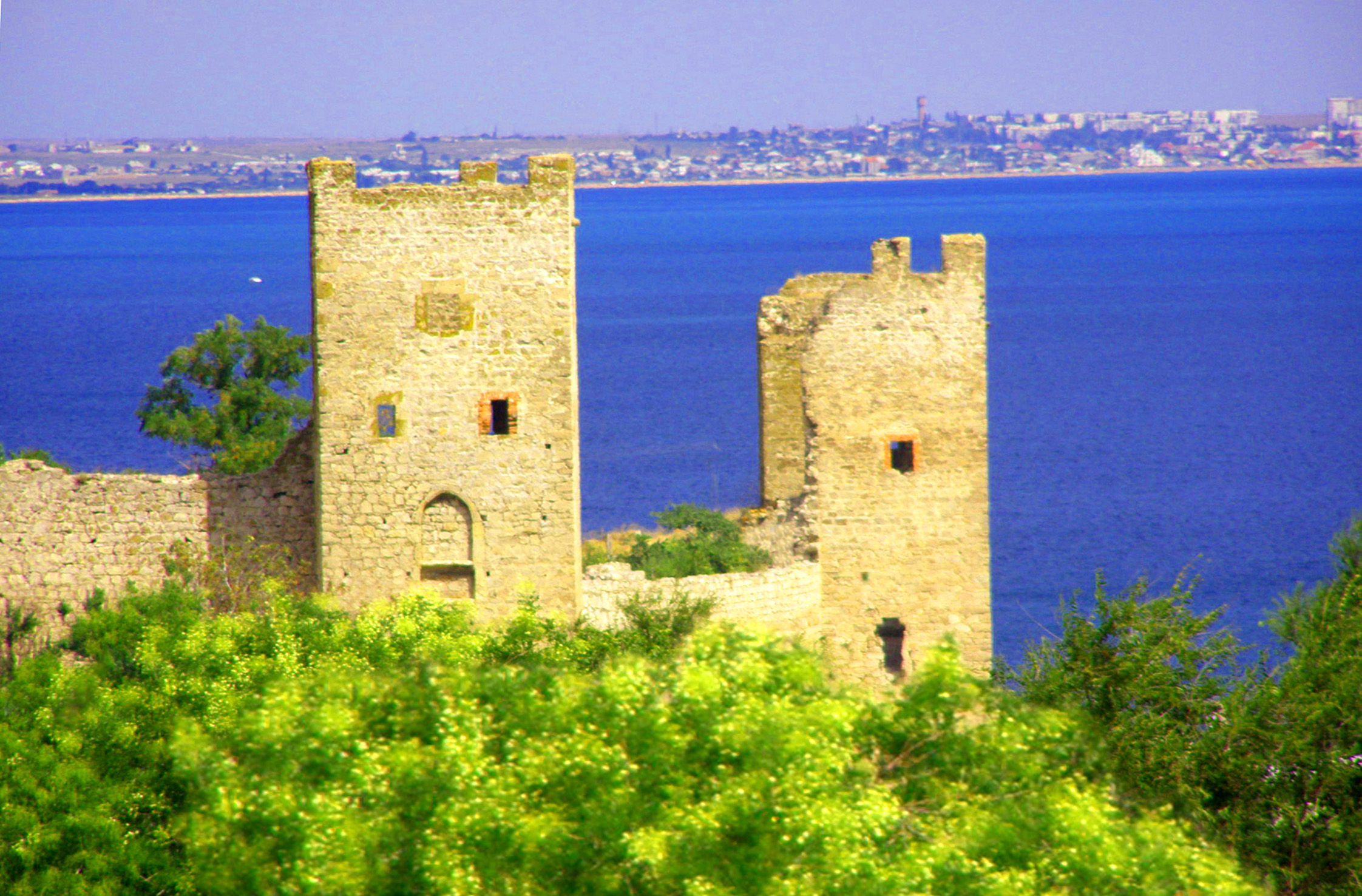
Genoese fortress of Caffa

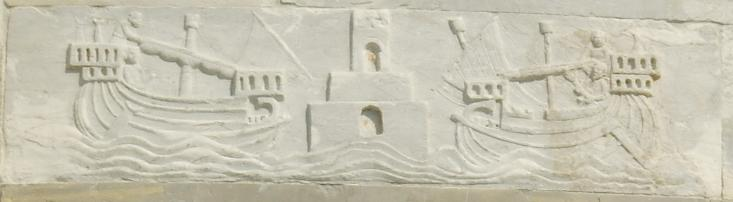
Bas-relief on the Tower of Pisa depicting Porto Pisano

In the 13th century, the Republic of Genoa conquered numerous settlements in Crimea, where the Genoese colony of Caffa was established. The alliance with the restored Byzantine Empire under the Palaiologos dynasty increased the wealth and power of Genoa and simultaneously decreased Venetian and Pisan commerce. The Byzantine Empire had granted most of their free trading rights to Genoa. In 1282, Pisa tried to gain control of the commerce and administration of Corsica, when Sinucello, the judge of Cinarca, revolted against Genoa and asked for Pisan support.

In August 1282, part of the Genoese fleet blockaded Pisan commerce near the River Arno. During 1283, both Genoa and Pisa made war preparations. Pisa gathered soldiers from Tuscany and appointed captains from its noble families. Genoa built 120 galleys; sixty of these belonged to the Republic and the remainder were rented to individuals. This fleet required at least 15,000 to 17,000 rowers and seamen.

In early 1284, the Genoese fleet tried to conquer Porto Torres and Sassari in Sardinia. Part of the Genoese merchant fleet defeated a Pisan force while travelling to the Byzantine Empire. The Genoese fleet blocked Porto Pisano and attacked Pisan ships travelling in the Mediterranean Sea. A Genoese force of thirty ships led by Benedetto Zaccaria travelled to Porto Torres to support Genoese forces which were besieging Sassari.

== Battle ==
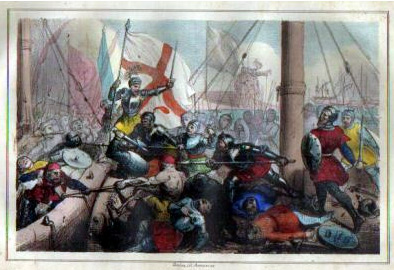
Lithograph of the battle of Meloria by Armanino

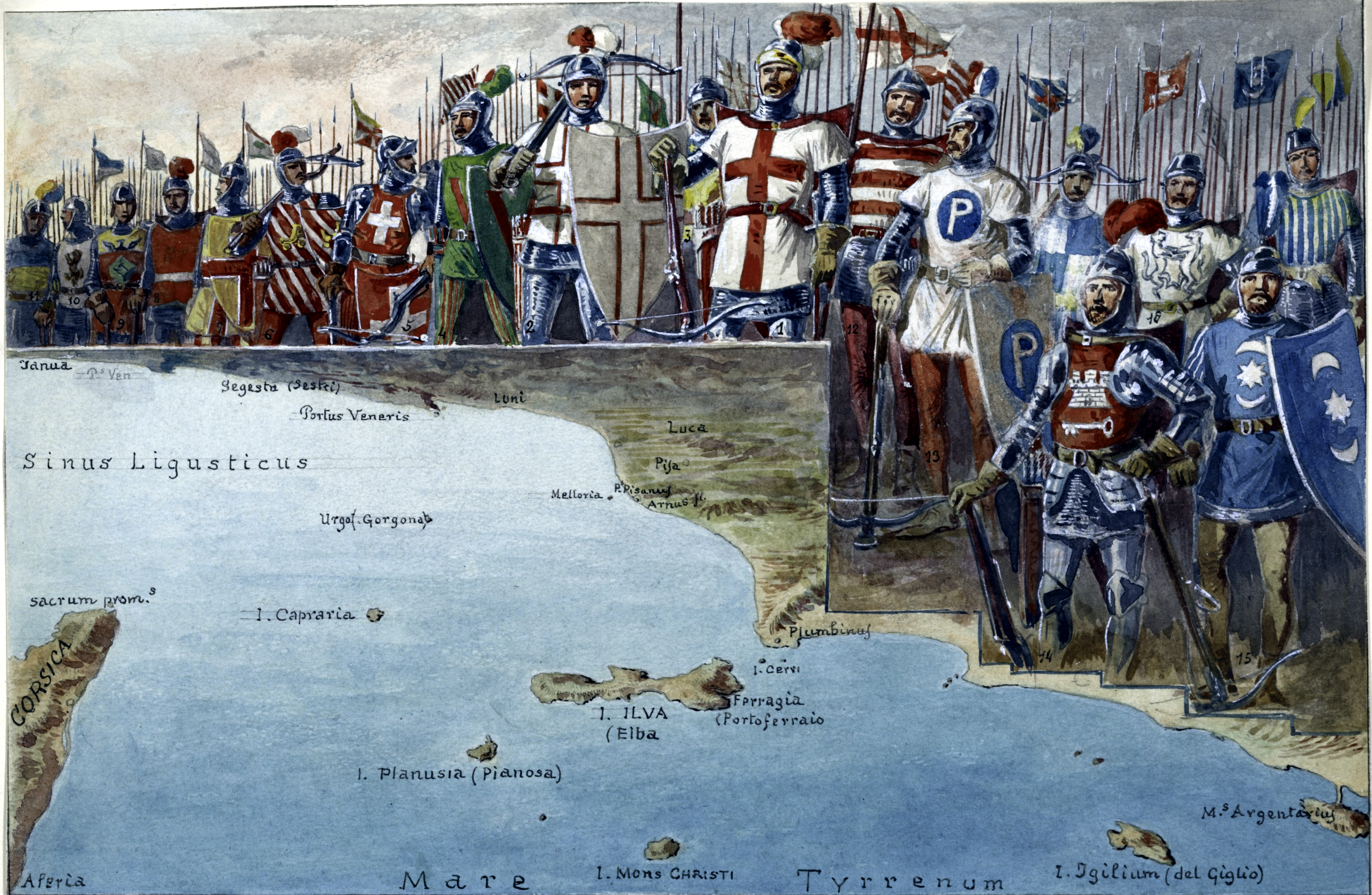
Litograph of the battleground of Meloria and of the Genoese troops participating in it

When the Genoese appeared off Meloria, the Pisans were lying in the Arno at the mouth of which lay Porto Pisano, the port of the city. The Pisan fleet represented the whole power of the city, and carried members of every family of mark and most of the officers of state. The Genoese, desiring to draw their enemy out to battle and to make the action decisive, arranged their fleet in two lines abreast. According to Agostino Giustiniani, the first was composed of fifty-eight galleys, and eight panfili—a class of light galley of eastern origin named after the province of Pamphylia. Oberto Doria, the Genoese admiral, was stationed in the centre and in advance of his line. To the right were the galleys of the Spinola family, among those of four of the eight companies into which Genoa was divided: Castello, Piazzalunga, Macagnana and San Lorenzo. To the left were the galleys of the Doria family and the companies Porta, Soziglia, Porta Nuova and Il Borgo. The second line of twenty galleys under the command of Benedetto Zaccaria was placed so far behind the first that the Pisans could not see whether it was made up of war-vessels or of small craft meant to act as tenders to the others. It was near enough to strike in and decide the battle when the action had begun.

The Pisans, commanded by the Podestà Morosini and his lieutenants Ugolino della Gherardesca and Andreotto Saraceno, came out in a single body. While the Archbishop was blessing the fleet, the silver cross of his archiepiscopal staff fell off, but the omen was disregarded by the irreverence of the Pisans, who declared that if they had the wind they could do without divine help. The Pisan fleet advanced in line abreast to meet the first line of the Genoese, fighting according to the medieval custom of ramming and boarding. The victory was decided for Genoa by the squadron of Zaccaria, which fell on the flank of the Pisans. Their fleet was nearly annihilated, the Podestà was captured and Ugolino fled with a few vessels.

== Aftermath ==
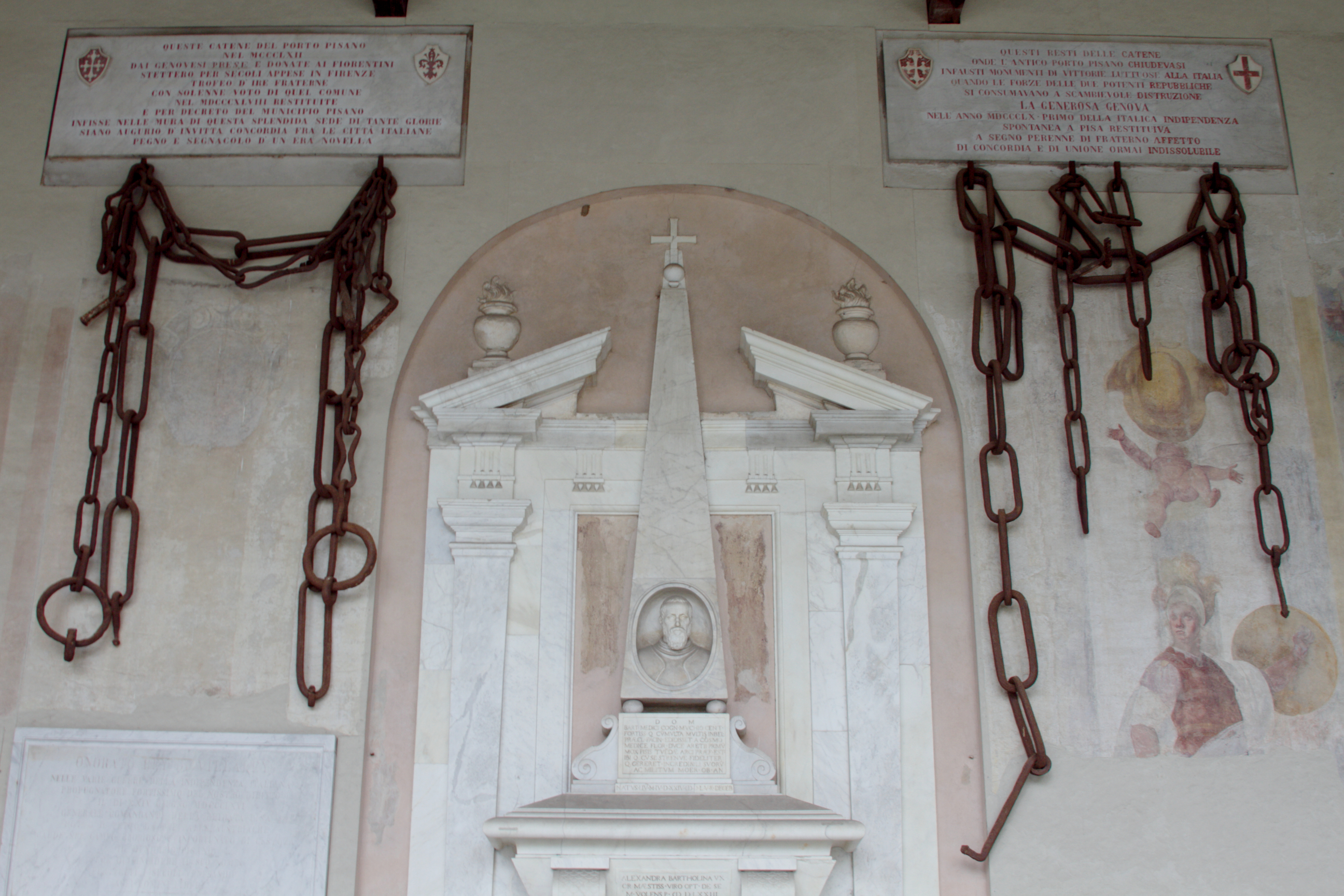
Chains from Porto Pisano taken by Genoa (returned in 1860 to Pisa)

Pisa was also attacked by Florence and Lucca, and it was never able to recover from the disaster. Two years later, Genoa took Porto Pisano, the city's access to the sea, and filled up the harbour. Pisa lost its role as a major Mediterranean naval power and a regional power of Tuscany (being overshadowed and finally conquered in 1406 by Florence). Count Ugolino was afterwards starved to death, along with several of his sons and grandsons, an event recounted in the 33rd canto of Dante's Inferno. One famous captive of the battle was Rustichello da Pisa, who co-wrote Marco Polo's account of his travels, Il Milione.

== See also ==
- History of Genoa
- History of Pisa
- Genoese crossbowmen
