= Meloria south end Lighthouse =

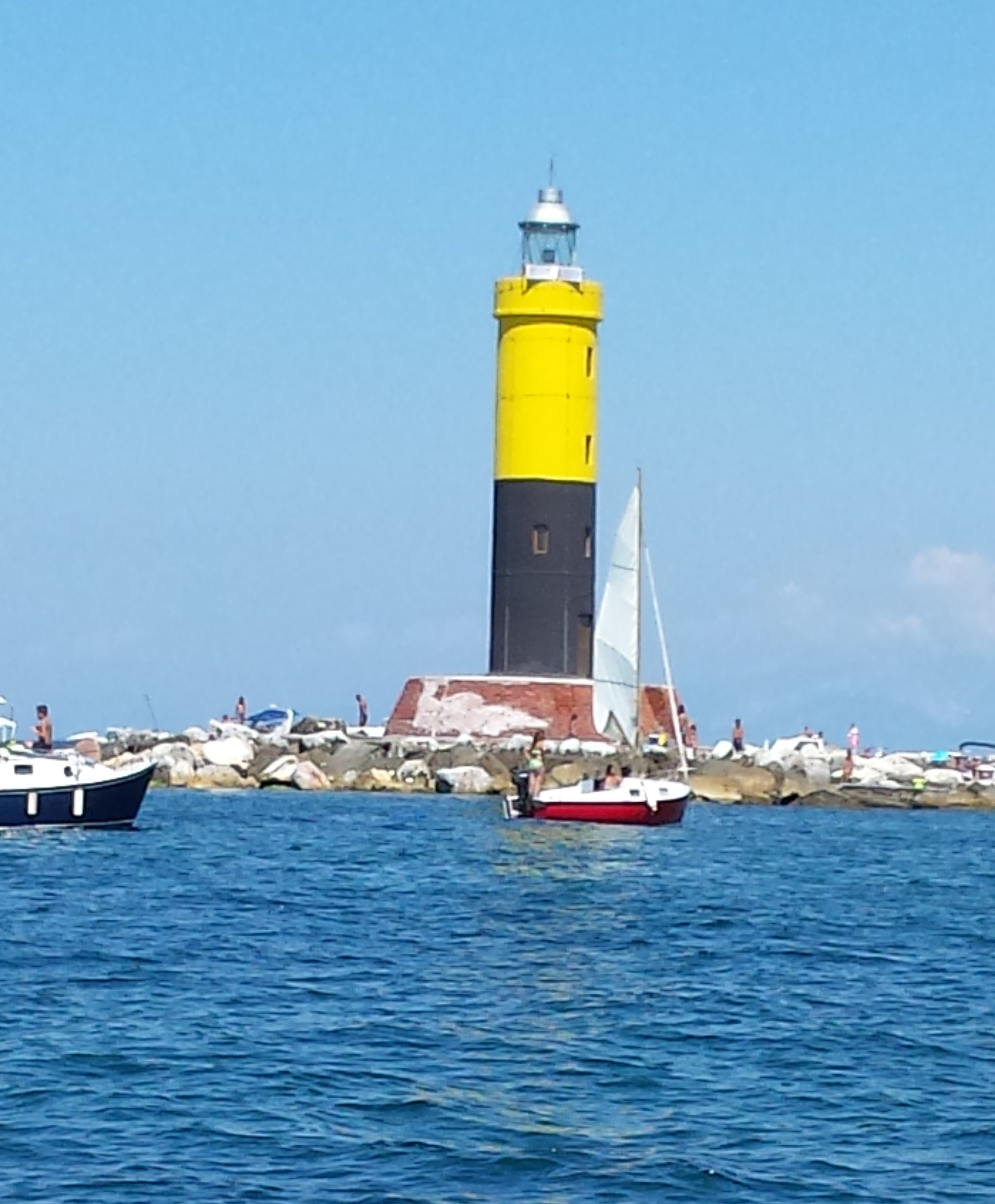
- Location: Livorno; Tuscany; Italy
- Coordinates: 43°32′46″N 10°13′08″E

Tower
- Constructed: 1867 (first)
- Foundation: concrete base
- Construction: concrete and brick tower
- Height: 17 metres (56 ft)
- Shape: cylindrical tower with lantern and gallery
- Markings: upper half painted yellow, lower half painted black
- Power source: solar power
- Operator: Marina Militare

Light
- First lit: 1950s. (current)
- Focal height: 18 metres (59 ft)
- Lens: Type TD
- Intensity: LABI 100 W
- Range: 10 nautical miles (19 km; 12 mi)
- Characteristic: Q (6) + L FI 10s.
- Italy no.: 1888 E.F

Meloria south end Lighthouse (Italian: Faro Sud delle Secche della Meloria) is an active lighthouse located in the Ligurian Sea, 3 nautical miles (5.6 km; 3.5 mi) west of the south entrance of the Port of Livorno, in the southern part of the Meloria shoal.

== Description ==
Because the Meloria Tower has not been an active lighthouse for a long time, on May 15, 1867, at 157 metres (515 ft) from the Tower, a 20 metres (66 ft) high metal structure lighthouse was built. It was replaced in the 1950s by a new cylindrical tower 18 metres (59 ft) high in masonry with lantern and balcony distinguished by the upper half painted in yellow and the lower half in black. The lighthouse has a solar power unit and the lantern emits six quick flashing and one long white flash in a ten seconds period visible up to 10 nautical miles (19 km; 12 mi). The light is operated by the Marina Militare and it is identified by the code number 1888 E.F.

== See also ==
- List of lighthouses in Italy
- Meloria north end Lighthouse
