= Deodato Orlandi =

Italian painter

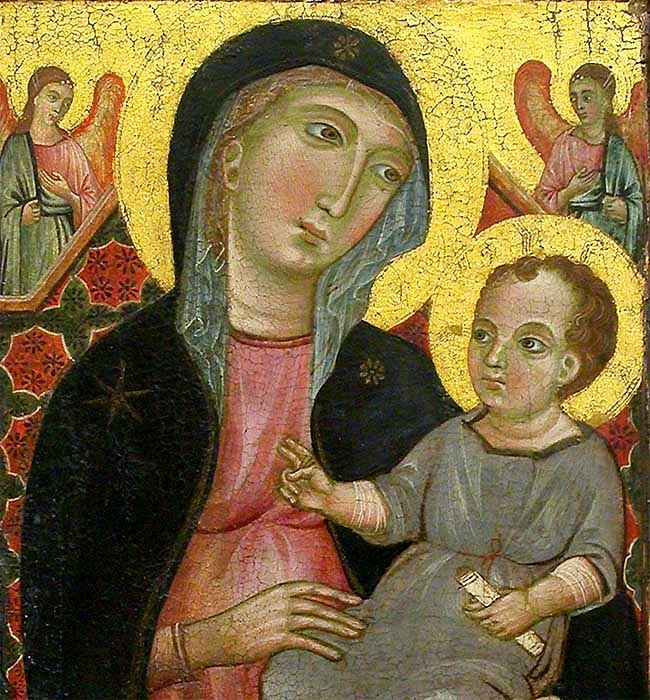
Virgin and Child, Louvre

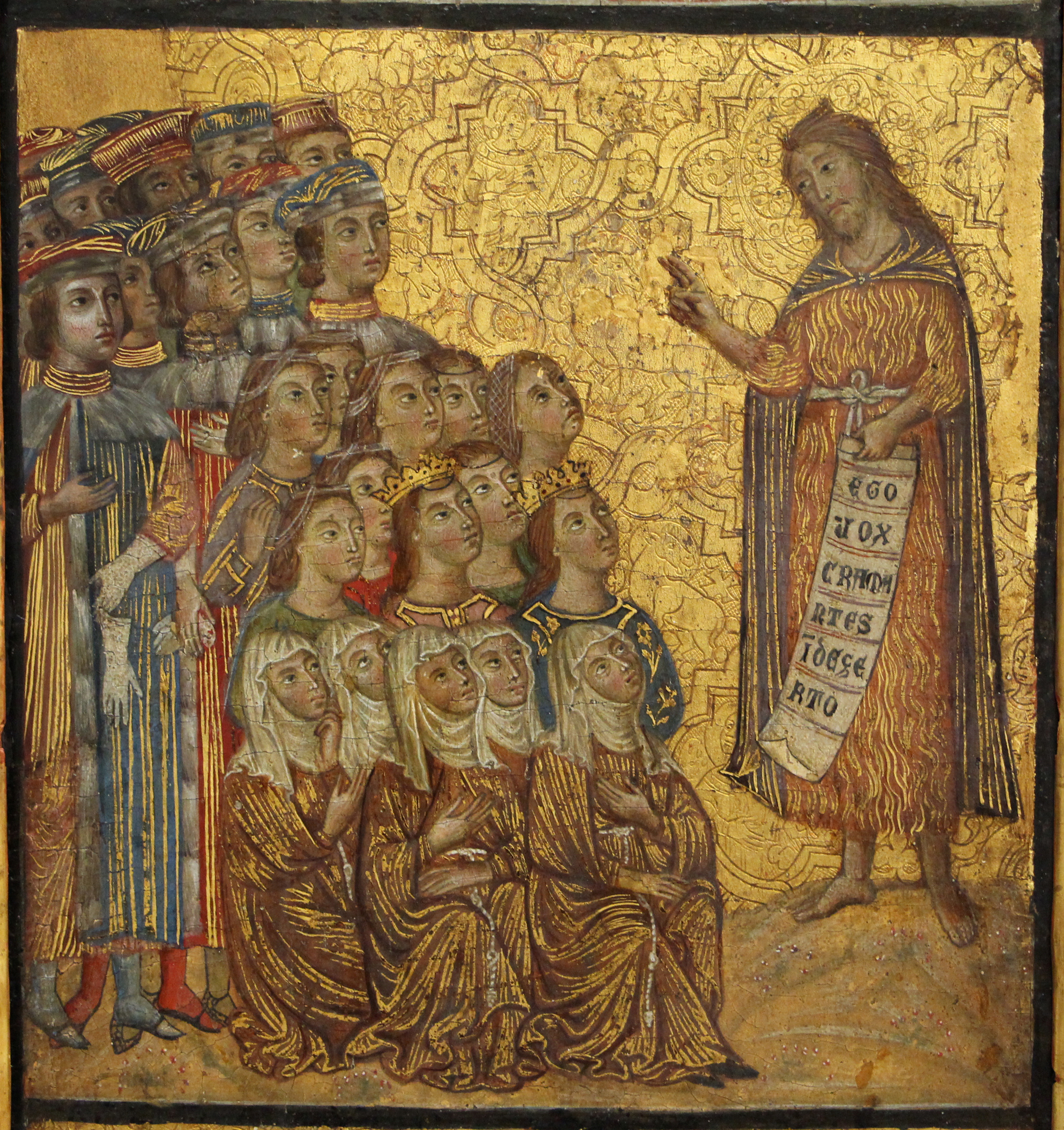
John the Baptist preaching

Deodato Orlandi (active 1284–1315, died before 1331) was an Italian painter who was active in Lucca and Pisa. His work marks the transition from the Italo-Byzantine painting of the 13th century to the Giotto-inspired style of the 14th century.

== Life ==
Orlandi was active in Lucca and Pisa between 1284 and 1315. He primarily painted religious-themed works on commissions for churches. Some of his works show a Byzantine art style, and an influence of Giotto can also be seen.

He painted frescos for the San Piero a Grado church, which was commissioned by the Caetani family for the 1300 jubilee. In the lower part are Portraits of Popes, from St. Peter to John XVIII (1303); the intermediate portion has thirty panels with Histories of St. Peter's Life (as well of those of St. Paul, Constantine and St. Sylvester), similar to those in the Old St. Peter's Basilica and to Cimabue's work at San Francesco in Assisi. In the upper area are portrayed the Walls of the Heaven City, largely restored in the following centuries.
