= Nodica =

- Frazione
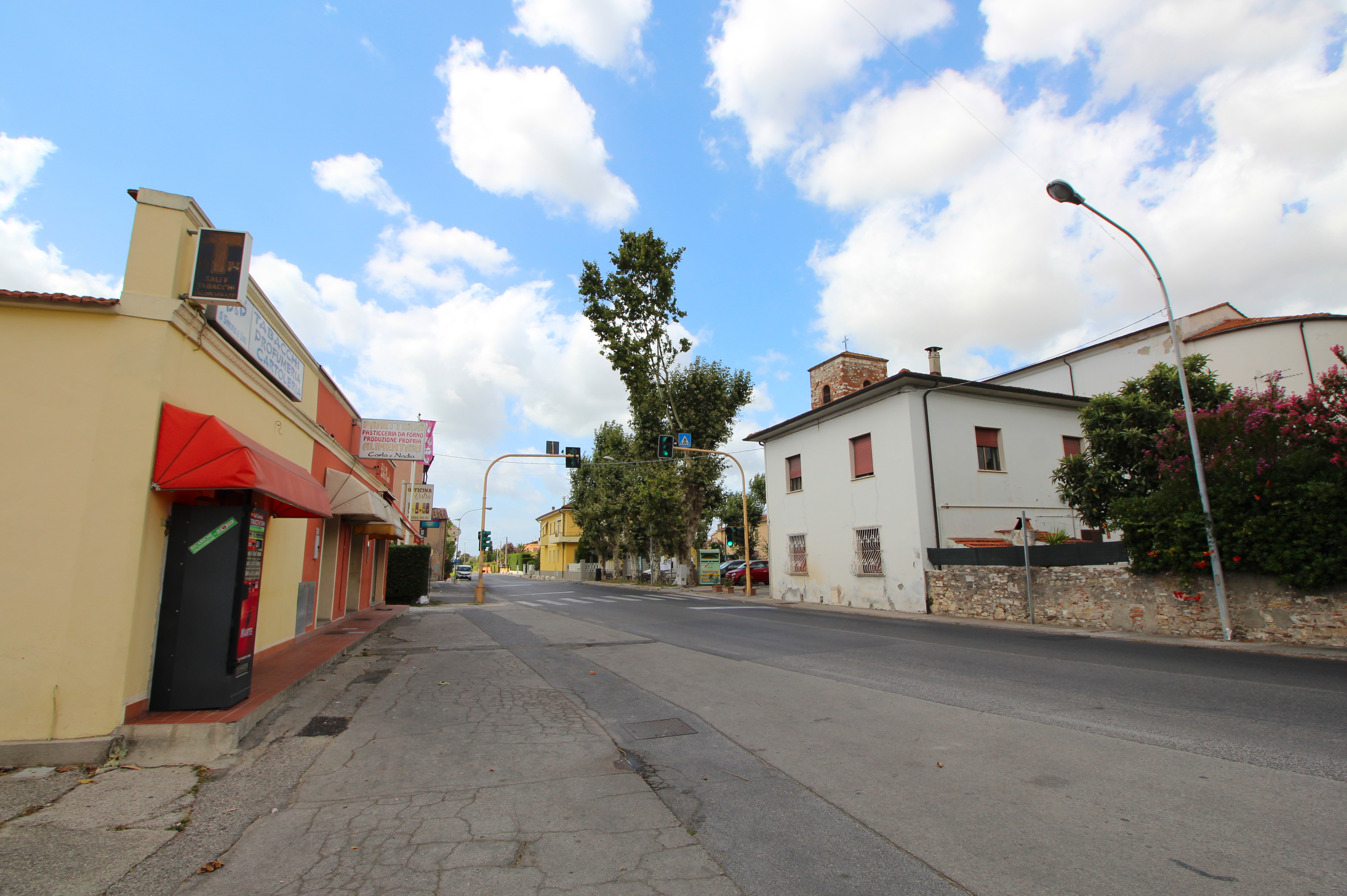

- Location of Nodica in Italy
- Coordinates: 43°47′12″N 10°21′52″E
- Country: Italy
- Region: Tuscany
- Province: Pisa (PI)
- Comune: Vecchiano
- Elevation: 5 m (16 ft)

Population
  - Total: 2,870
- Demonym: Nodichesi
- Time zone: UTC+1 (CET)
  - Summer (DST): UTC+2 (CEST)
- Postal code: 56019
- Dialing code: (+39) 050

Nodica is a village in Tuscany, central Italy, administratively a frazione of the comune of Vecchiano, province of Pisa. At the time of the 2006 parish census its population was 2,870.

Nodica is about 11 km from Pisa and 1 km from Vecchiano.
