= San Piero a Grado =

Church in Pisa, Tuscany, Italy

Coordinates: 43°40′47″N 10°20′48″E

Basilica of San Piero a Grado
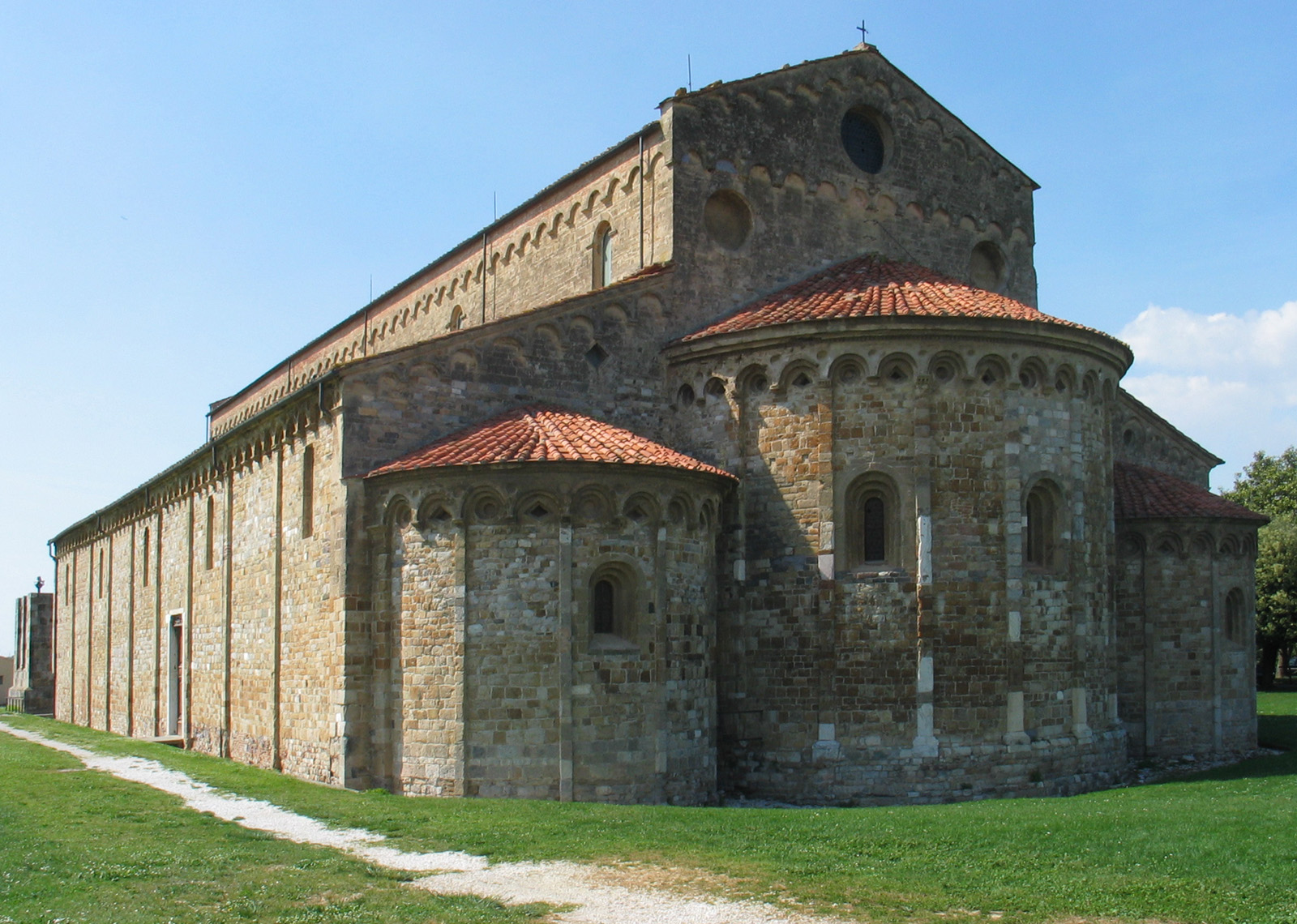
- Facade

Religion
- Affiliation: Roman Catholic
- Province: Pisa

Location
- Location: Pisa, Italy
- Interactive map of Basilica of San Piero a Grado

Architecture
- Type: Church
- Style: Romanesque
- Groundbreaking: 10th century
- Completed: 12th Century

San Piero a Grado (Italian: Basilica di San Pietro Apostolo) is a church in Pisa, Tuscany, Italy. It is located in the eponymous frazione 7 kilometres (4.3 mi) west of the city center. The church is located where a now vanished port of the Pisan Republic once stood, and, where, according to the legend, St. Peter landed in Italy from Antiochia in 44 AD.

== History and overview ==
Archaeological excavations have shown the presence of a Palaeo-Christian edifice in the area, built over civil Roman structures, which was later replaced by a larger church in the early Middle Ages (8th-9th centuries). The current construction, begun in the 10th century and renovated in the late 11th-early 12th centuries, has a basilica plan with a nave and two aisles. Unusual is the presence of apsidal structures on the facade, probably built after the crumbling of the facade during a flood of the Arno River. The entrance is on the northern side.

The exterior, made of stone of different provenance, is marked by pilaster strips and arches over which are precious bacini (ceramic basins, the originals are in the National Museum of St Matthew in Pisa) of Islamic, Majorca and Sicilian manufacture decorated with geometrical and figurative motifs (10th-11th centuries).

The 12th-century bell tower was destroyed in 1944. Only the base has been rebuilt.

The large interior with truss ceiling is divided into a nave and two aisles by antique columns with classical capitals. In the western part is a Gothic ciborium (early 15th century) which marks the place where Peter would pray for the first time.

On the walls of the nave is a large fresco cycle, recently restored, by the Lucchese Deodato Orlandi (early 14th century), which was commissioned by the Caetani family for the 1300 jubilee. In the lower part are Portraits of Popes, from St. Peter to John XVIII (1303); the intermediate portion has thirty panels with Histories of St. Peter's Life (as well of those of St. Paul, Constantine and St. Sylvester), similar to those in the Old St. Peter's Basilica and to Cimabue's work at San Francesco in Assisi. In the upper area are portrayed the Walls of the Heaven City, largely restored in the following centuries.

On the high altar is a wooden crucifix from the 17th century.

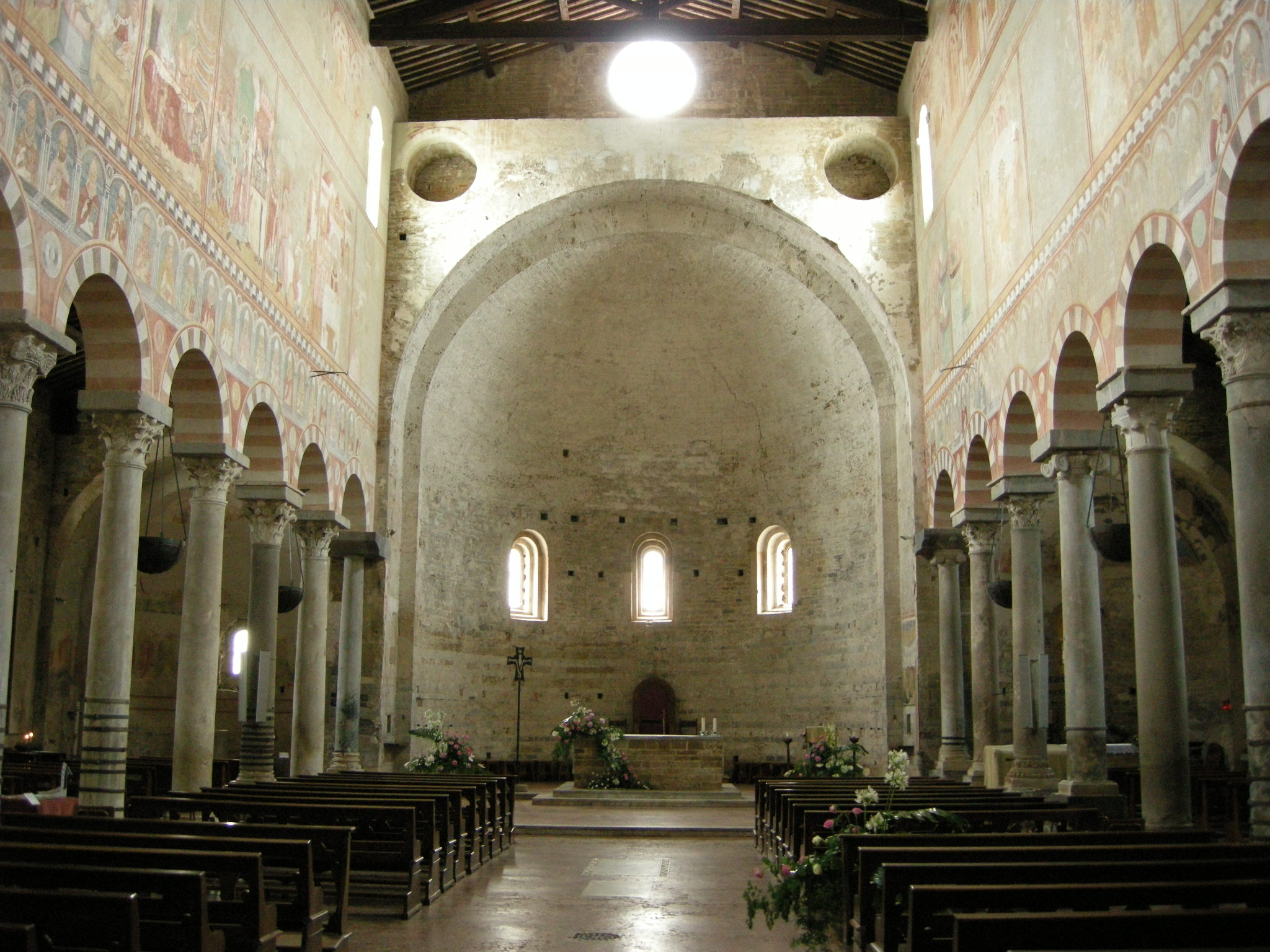
Interior

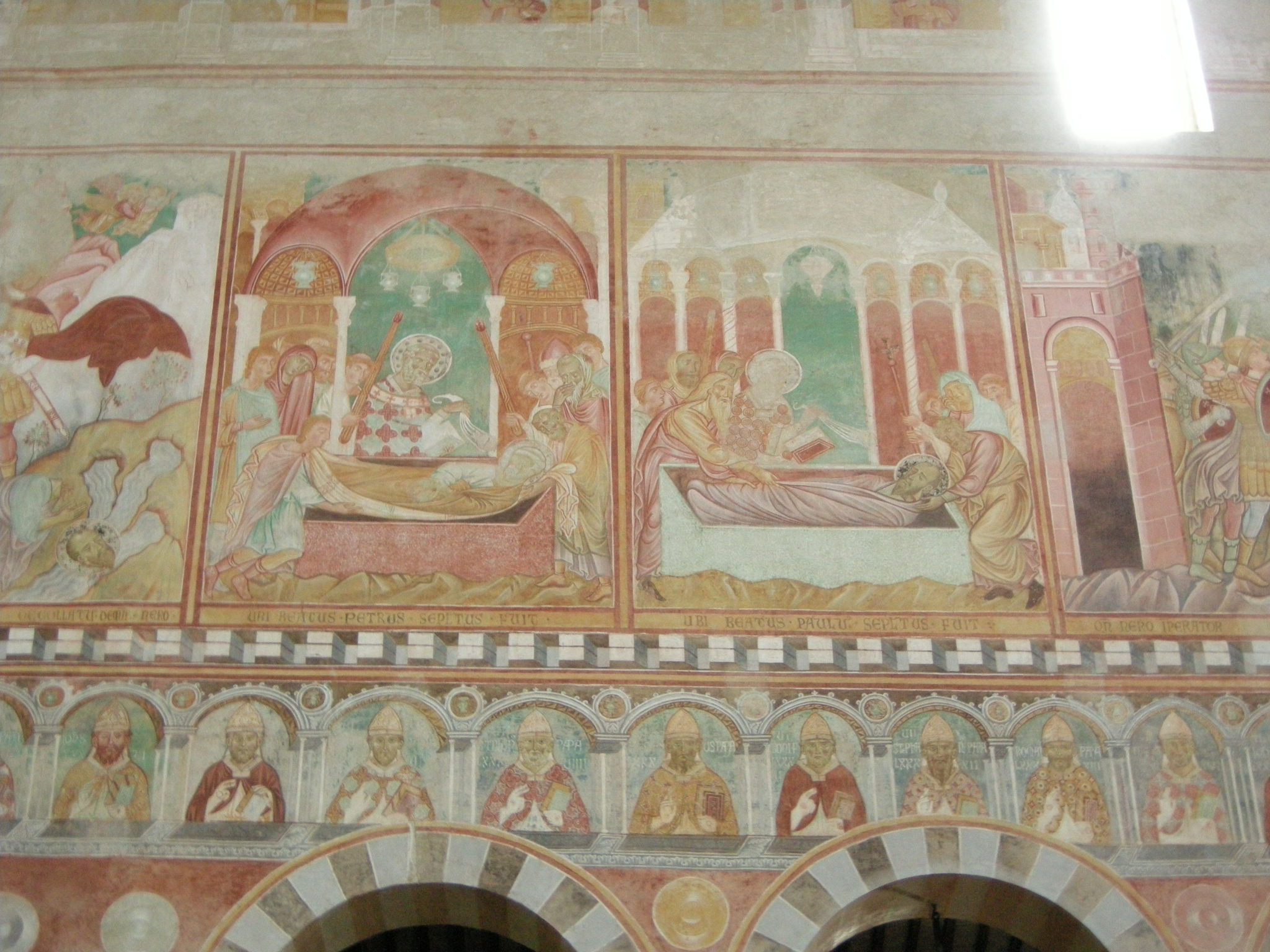
Nave Frescoes
