= Filettole =

- Frazione
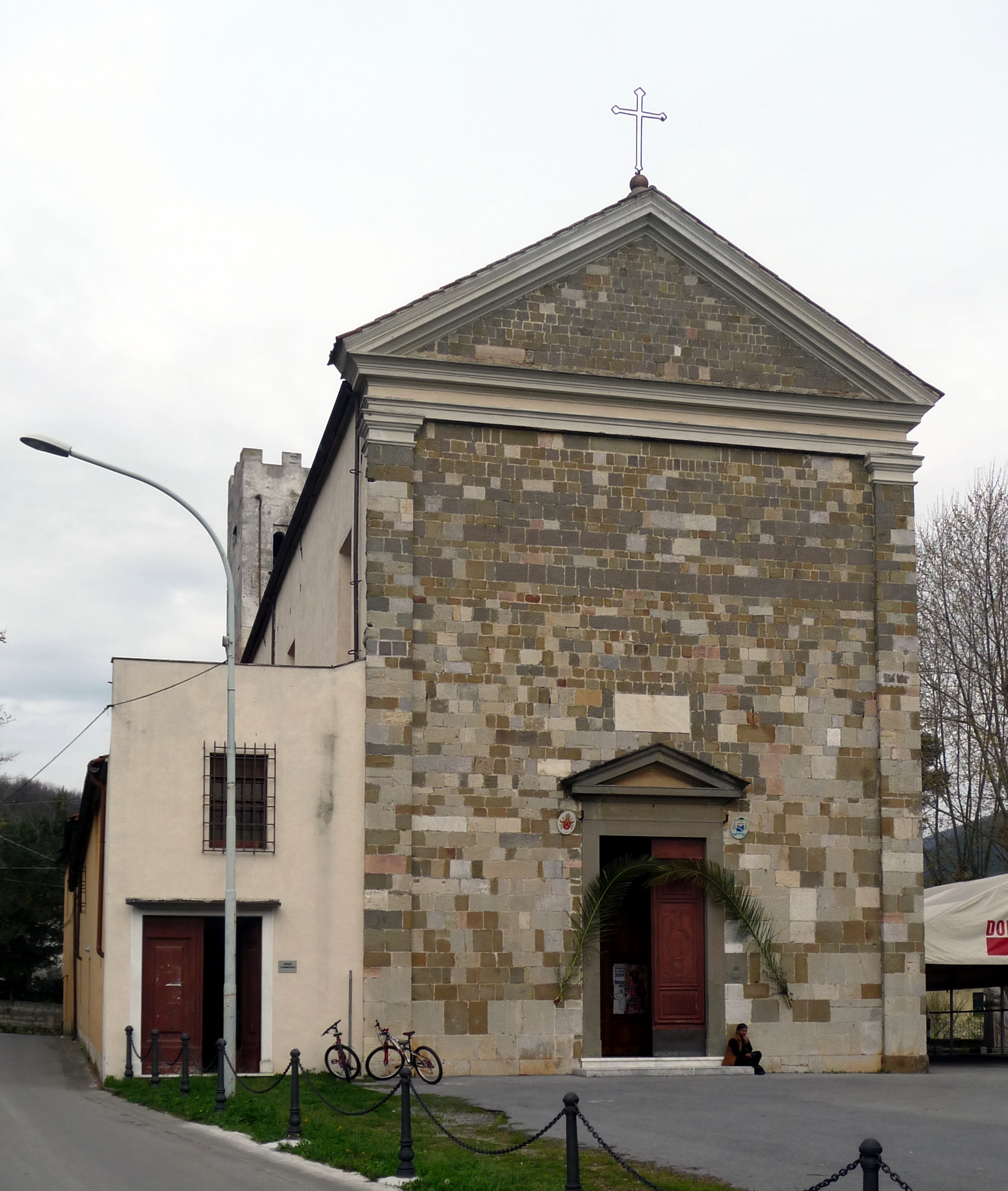
- The church of San Maurizio in Filettole

- Location of Filettole in Italy
- Coordinates: 43°48′50″N 10°24′11″E
- Country: Italy
- Region: Tuscany
- Province: Pisa (PI)
- Comune: Vecchiano
- Elevation: 10 m (33 ft)

Population (2011)
  - Total: 1,382
- Demonym: Filettolini
- Time zone: UTC+1 (CET)
  - Summer (DST): UTC+2 (CEST)
- Postal code: 56019
- Dialing code: (+39) 050

Filettole is a town on the Serchio River. It represents the border between province of Pisa and province of Lucca.

Its castle had a defensive function against the Lombards. It is named after "Fylakterion", which means "defensive place" in the Greek language. It belonged to the Roncioni family at the end of the tenth century, and then to the Bishop of Pisa. Involver in the battles with the near Republic of Lucca, it is bought by Gambacorti at the end of the 14th century, then acquired by the Grand Duchy of Tuscany. Now it is part of Vecchiano. In 1944, soldiers of German 16th SS division "Reichsfuhrer" shot 40 people in Filettole, including Don Angelo Uniti. This dramatic episode is remembered as "la Strage del Canneto di Filettole".
