= Porto Pisano =

Coordinates: 43°40′47″N 10°20′48″E

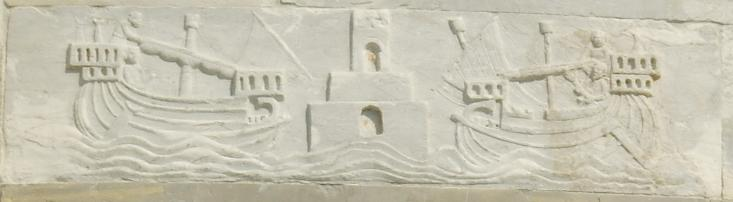
Bas-relief on the Tower of Pisa depicting Porto Pisano.

Porto Pisano, also known as Triturrita, was the main seaport of the Republic of Pisa, located on the Ligurian Sea coast close to the mouth of the Arno River. In the 13th century, at its peak, Porto Pisano was one of the most important sea ports in Italy, which rivaled if not surpassed both Genoa and Venice.

In the Battle of Meloria in 1284 Porto Pisano was blockaded by the Genoese fleet, and Pisa suffered a heavy defeat, which eventually resulted in its decline. Subsequently, Porto Pisano was controlled by Genoa. On August 28, 1421, the port was sold to Florence which has chosen to use Livorno as its principal seaport, since Porto Pisano suffered from increasing alluvial deposits, and the coastline had moved away from the port. After the 16th century, it ceased entirely to be used.

Currently the site of Porto Pisano is occupied by San Piero a Grado, a suburb of Pisa.

== History ==
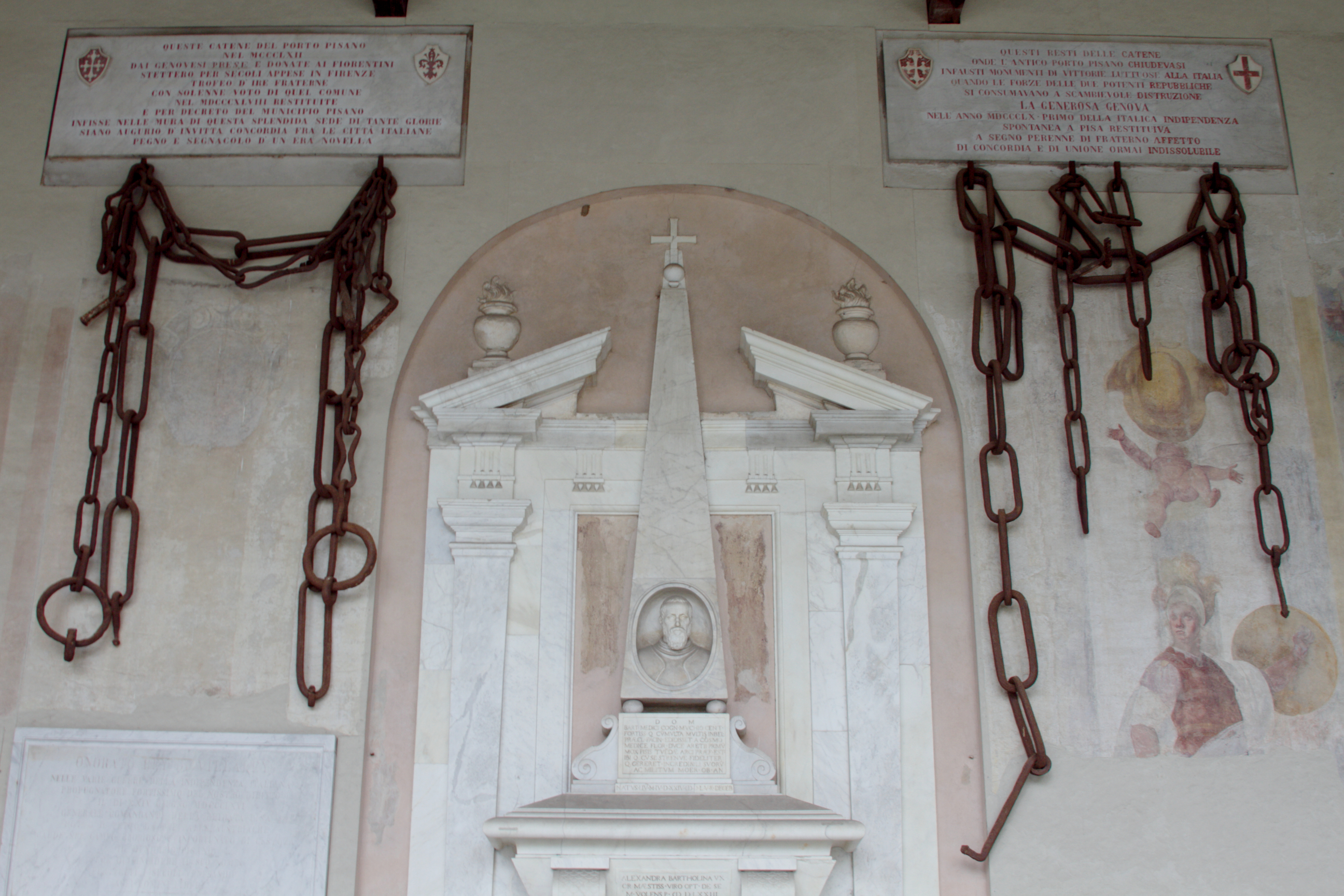
Chains from Porto Pisano taken by Republic of Genoa (returned in 1860 to Pisa)

In the 12th century, Pisa was one of the most important trading cities of Italy, however, it was located slightly off the coast and badly needed a sea port. Porto Pisano was before the middle of the 12th century merely a landing, and in 1156, works to make a major port started. Between 1154 and 1163, three towers were built to guard Porto Pisano; one more tower was built in the sea to guide the ships. From 1162, the entrance to the port was guarded by a chain hung between two of the towers. In 1174, a large warehouse was constructed. From Porto Pisano, the ships went along the coast to the mouth of the Arno and then upstream to Pisa. This short stretch of the coast was under constant threat by the Genoese and by pirates, and therefore needed to be patrolled by the Pisan fleet. There was also a road running overland between Pisa and Porto Pisano, with two hospitals for sick travelers.

Between 1285 and 1290, the port structures were destroyed by the Genoese, but within a few years, they were rebuilt, and the port was used again.
