= Migliarino Pisano =

- Frazione
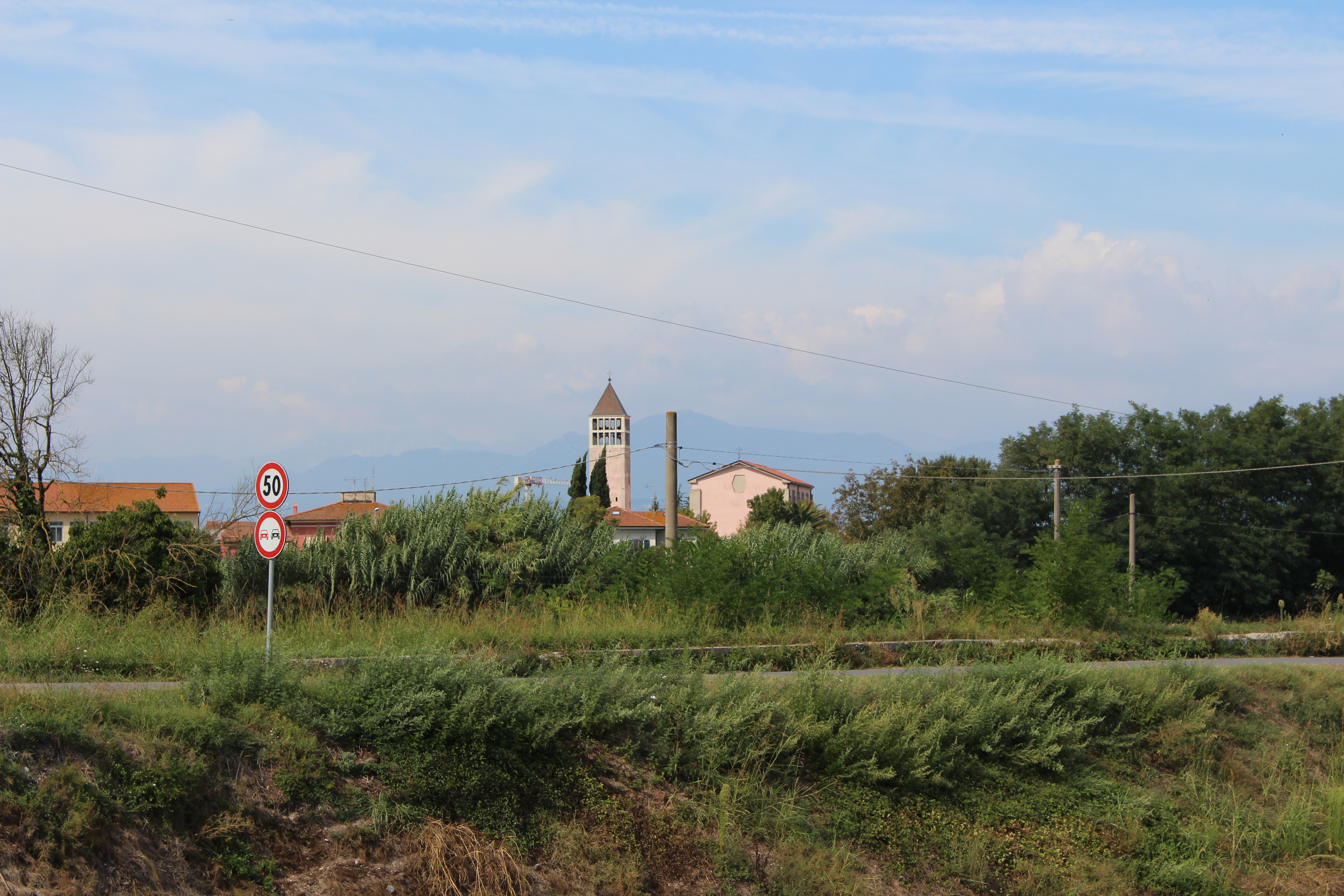

- Location of Migliarino Pisano in Italy
- Coordinates: 43°46′1″N 10°20′26″E
- Country: Italy
- Region: Tuscany
- Province: Pisa (PI)
- Comune: Vecchiano
- Elevation: 3 m (9.8 ft)

Population (2011)
  - Total: 2,807
- Time zone: UTC+1 (CET)
  - Summer (DST): UTC+2 (CEST)
- Postal code: 56019
- Dialing code: (+39) 050

Migliarino Pisano is a village in Tuscany, central Italy, administratively a frazione of the comune of Vecchiano, province of Pisa. At the time of the 2001 census its population was 2,678.

Migliarino Pisano is about 6 km from Pisa and 5 km from Vecchiano.
