= Vecchiano =

- Comune
- Comune di Vecchiano
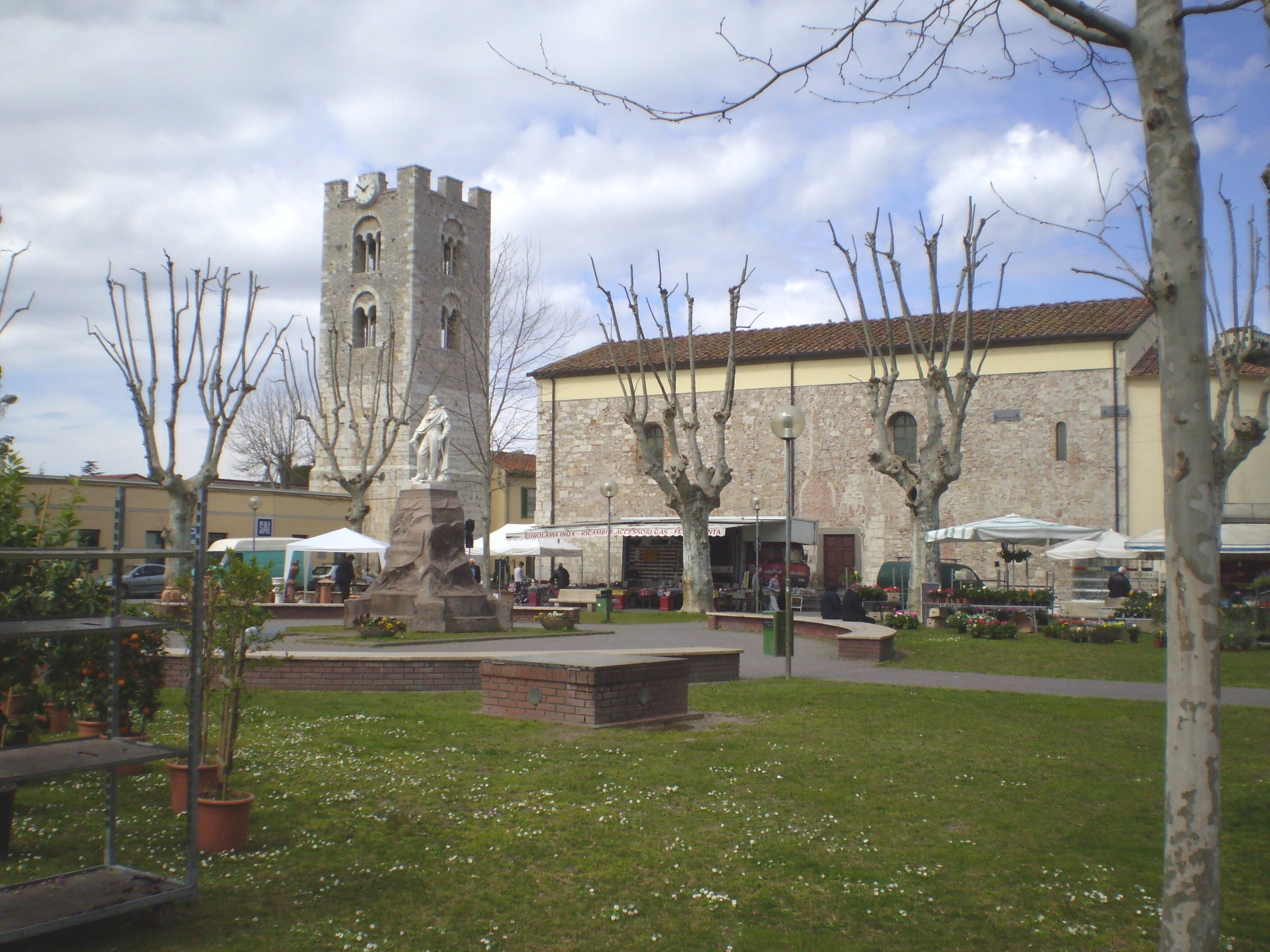

- Coat of arms

- Location within Italy Location within Tuscany
- Coordinates: 43°47′N 10°23′E
- Country: Italy
- Region: Tuscany
- Province: Pisa (PI)
- Frazioni: Avane, Filettole, Migliarino Pisano, Nodica

Government
  - Mayor: Massimiliano Angori

Area
  - Total: 67.4 km^{2} (26.0 sq mi)
- Elevation: 5 m (16 ft)

Population (1 January 2016)
  - Total: 12,189
  - Density: 181/km^{2} (468/sq mi)
- Demonym: Vecchianesi
- Time zone: UTC+1 (CET)
  - Summer (DST): UTC+2 (CEST)
- Postal code: 56019
- Dialing code: 050
- Patron saint: St. Alexander
- Saint day: 3 May
- Website: Official website

Vecchiano is a comune (municipality) in the Province of Pisa in the Italian region Tuscany, located about 70 kilometres (43 miles) west of Florence and about 8 km (5 mi) north of Pisa. It is home to a castle, known as Gaetani or Lanfranchi castle, or as the hermitage of Santa Maria in Castello, which overlooks the town and the nearby plan.

Vecchiano borders the following municipalities: Lucca, Massarosa, San Giuliano Terme, Viareggio.
