= Serchio =

River in Italy

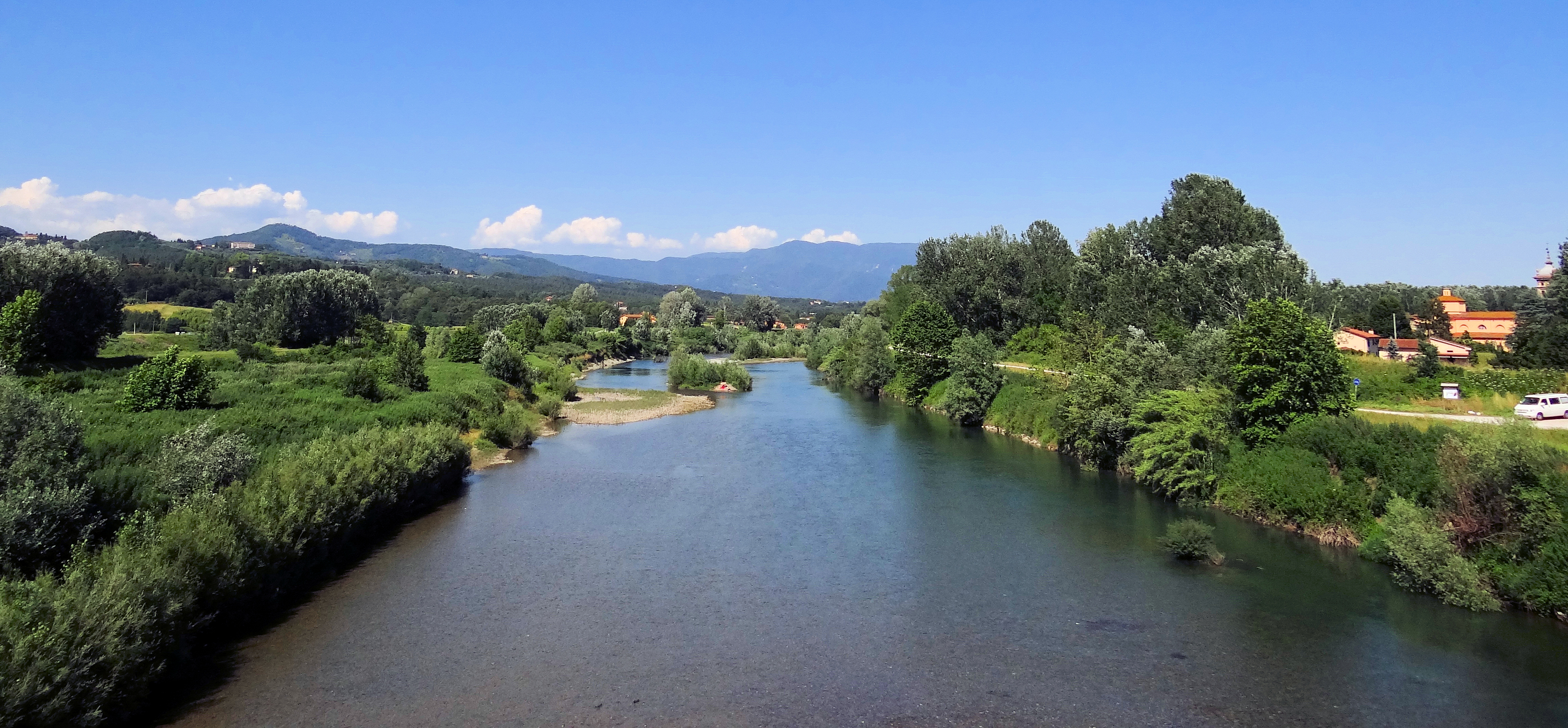
- the Serchio near Lucca

Location
- Country: Italy

Physical characteristics
- Source
  - location: Monte Sillano
  - elevation: about 1,500 m (4,900 ft)
- Mouth: Tyrrhenian Sea
  - coordinates: 43°47′N 10°16′E
- Length: 126 km (78 mi)
- Basin size: 1,525 km^{2} (589 sq mi)
- Discharge
  - average: 46 m^{3}/s (1,600 cu ft/s)

The Serchio (Italian: [ˈsɛrkjo]; Latin: Auser) is the third longest river in the Italian region of Tuscany at 126 kilometres (78 mi), coming after the Arno at 242 kilometres (150 mi) and the Ombrone, 161 kilometres (100 mi). By mean rate of flow, it is the second largest, smaller than the Arno but larger than Ombrone.

The principal source forms on the slopes of Monte Sillano, elevation 1,864 metres (6,115 ft) and is joined by a secondary branch, the Serchio di Gramolazzo, at Piazza al Serchio.

The river then crosses Garfagnana from north to south, from Sillano to a location beyond Castelnuovo di Garfagnana; from here it continues through the Media Valle touching the municipal borders of the Comune of Barga and crossing the territory of Borgo a Mozzano. In this section of the river, which is dammed in a number of places, it receives from the right the waters of the Edron, Tùrrite Secca, Tùrrite di Gallicano, Turrite Cava and the Pedogna; and from the left those of the Fiume, the Castiglione, the Sillico, and its most important tributary the Lima. This last, which is born at the Passo dell'Abetone and collects the waters of the Modenese and Pistoiese high Apennines, forms a sub-basin in its own right and achieves a mean discharge of more than 20 cubic metres per second (710 cu ft/s).

Having reached the plain of Lucca, where it is joined by the torrent Freddana, the Serchio turns westwards, crosses the “straits” of Filettole, and enters the Province of Pisa. Here it runs through San Giuliano Terme and Vecchiano before entering the Tyrrhenian Sea in the area of the Parco di San Rossore, a few kilometres to the north of Pisa.

The national road SS 12 (Abetone – Brennero) follows the course of the Serchio already to a Lucca's valley, after going up until Bagni di Lucca; from here until the origins, from street to Capanne di Sillano and the step of Pradarena.

The localities that the river crosses are, in Garfagnana: Castelnuovo di Garfagnana, Barga, Bagni di Lucca; and in Lucchesia: Borgo a Mozzano and Lucca.

== See also ==
- Ponte della Maddalena
