= San Giorgio ai Tedeschi =

Church in Pisa, Italy

Coordinates: 43°43′18″N 10°23′49″E

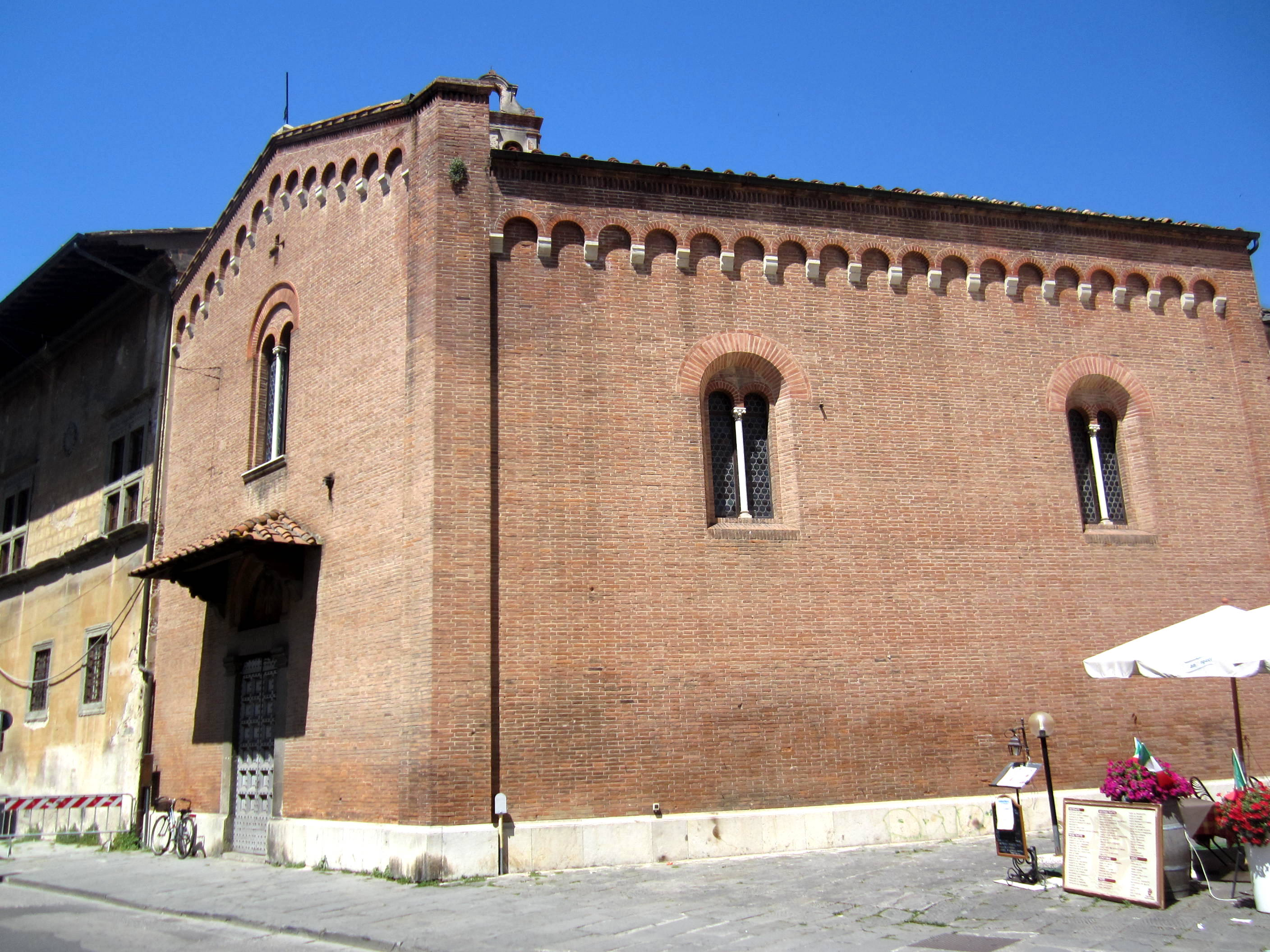
View of the church

San Giorgio ai Tedeschi is a Roman Catholic church located in the centre of Pisa, Italy.

The brickchurch was built after 1316 in memory of the German soldiers who died in the Battle of Montecatini; it was called San Giorgio degli Innocenti because in 1414 it belonged to the Ospedale dei Trovatelli (hospital of the foundlings); then from 1784 it belonged to the Ospedali Riuniti di Santa Chiara. The church, built entirely in brick, consists of only one room. The inside, which was restored after 1722, has a 14th-century crucifix made by a German artist with lavish golden stucco decorations and paintings from the 18th century.
