= Palazzo Agostini, Pisa =

Palace in Pisa, Italy

Coordinates: 43.71667°N 10.40041°E

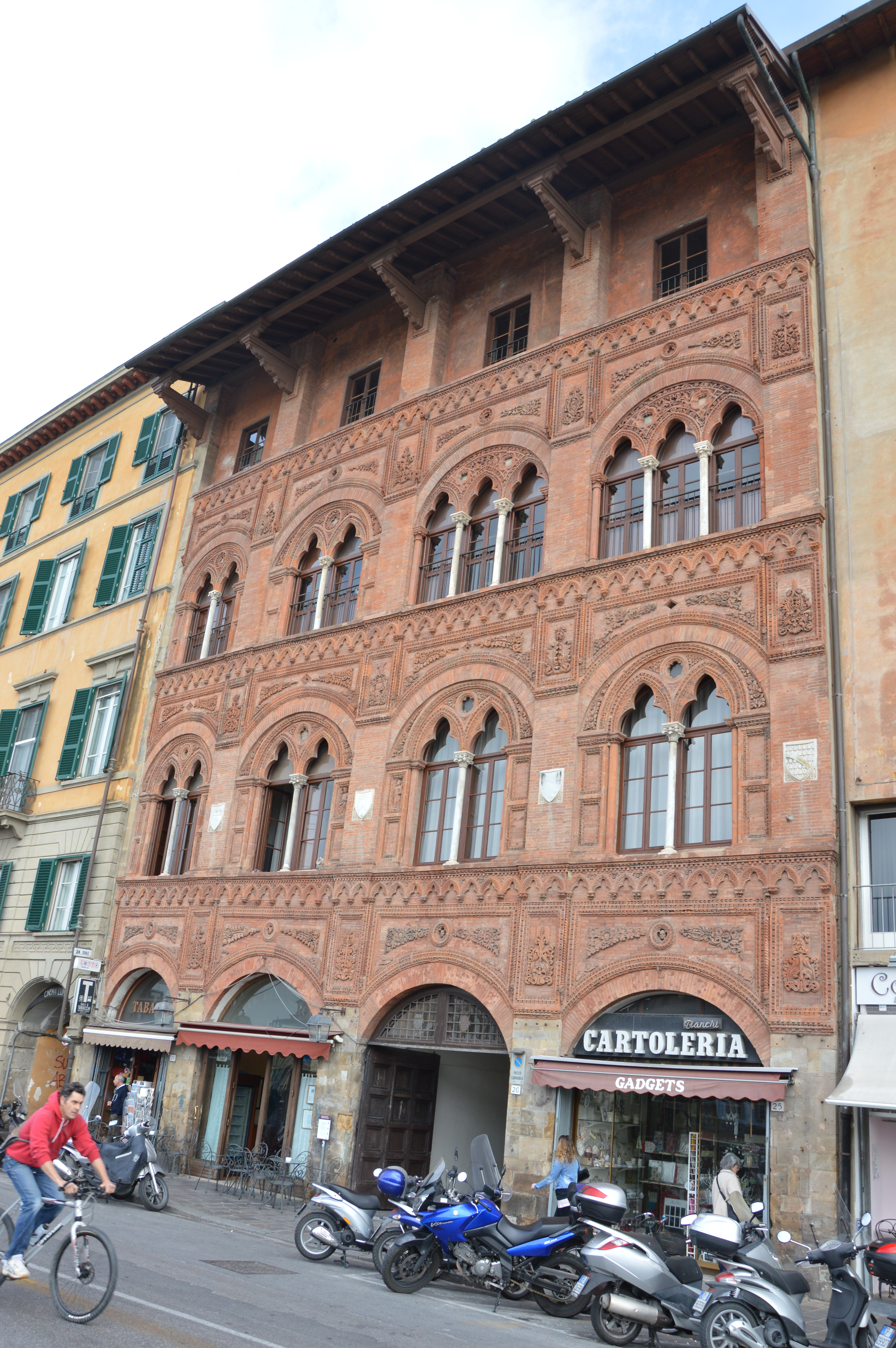

The Palazzo Agostini is a Gothic-style aristocratic palace located on Lungarno Pacinotti #26 along the north bank of the Arno river, in Pisa, region of Tuscany, Italy. The ground floor still houses the functioning Caffè dell'Ussero, founded in 1775.

== History and description ==
The palace was built in the 14th-century from the combination of two medieval towers at the site by the Astajo family. Over the following century, the palace was owned by various other families including the Della Seta, Fantini and Venerosi, until it was acquired in 1496 by the Agostini family. Descendants of the family still own the palace.

The structure is made of red brick and terracotta, and also known as the Palazzo Rosso (Red Palace). The mullioned windows are framed with decorative terracotta facing. Originally the 3rd floor was an open loggia. Adjacent to the palace was one of the oldest Italian cinemas, the Cinema Lumière, inaugurated in 1905 and closed in 2011 and transformed into a stage venue for concerts and music.

The Caffè dell'Ussero gained its name from a group of hussars who arrived in Pisa with Grand Grand-Duke Francis I in 1750, and who lodged in the palace. The coffee shop became a meeting spot for educated Pisans. It also became of spot for meeting of Italian patriots, and was a spot for departure of the locals who joined the Tuscan university battalion for the 1848 Battle of Curtatone and Montanara was organized.
