= Santa Cristina, Pisa =

Church in Pisa, Tuscany, Italy

Coordinates: 43°42′56.66″N 10°24′0.38″E

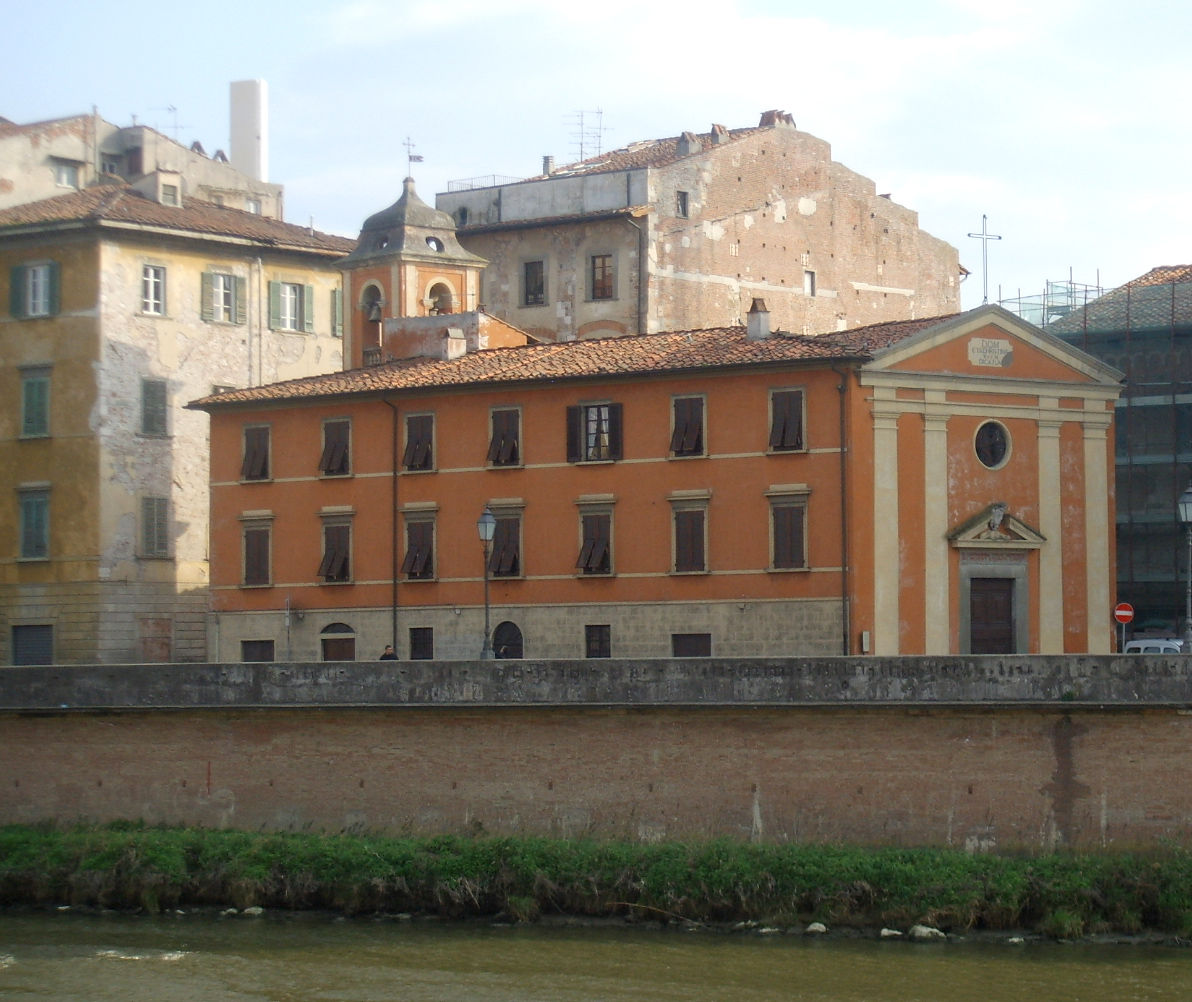
Santa Cristina

Santa Cristina is a Neoclassical-style, Roman Catholic church in Pisa, region of Tuscany, Italy. It is located on the Lungarno Gambacorti.

== History ==
The church is documented since the 9th century, but the apse area is from the 10th-11th century. Destroyed by a flood in 1115, it was rebuilt three years later.

The Count Luigi Archinto, member of a prominent Milanese family, had moved to Pisa in the late 18th century, and in 1814, he had acquired the Agnello palace adjacent to this church. He then patronized and commissioned the reconstruction of the church, which by then was in poor conservation. He commissioned the works from the engineer Francesco Riccetti, who also restored the bell tower.

The interior layout is that of a single nave, refurbished with neoclassical decorations. It houses a panel with Madonna and Child (14th century).

The first altar on the right has canvas by Domenico Passignano, depicting St Catherine Receiving the Stigmata, and a 19th-century copy of Enrico di Tedice's Crucifix (13th century). In this spot, with the earlier crucifix, was the one before which, in 1375, St Catherine of Siena, kneeling in prayer, had received the stigmata. Catherine had been invited to Pisa to help pacify some of the civic strife.
