= Pisa =

- Comune
- Comune di Pisa
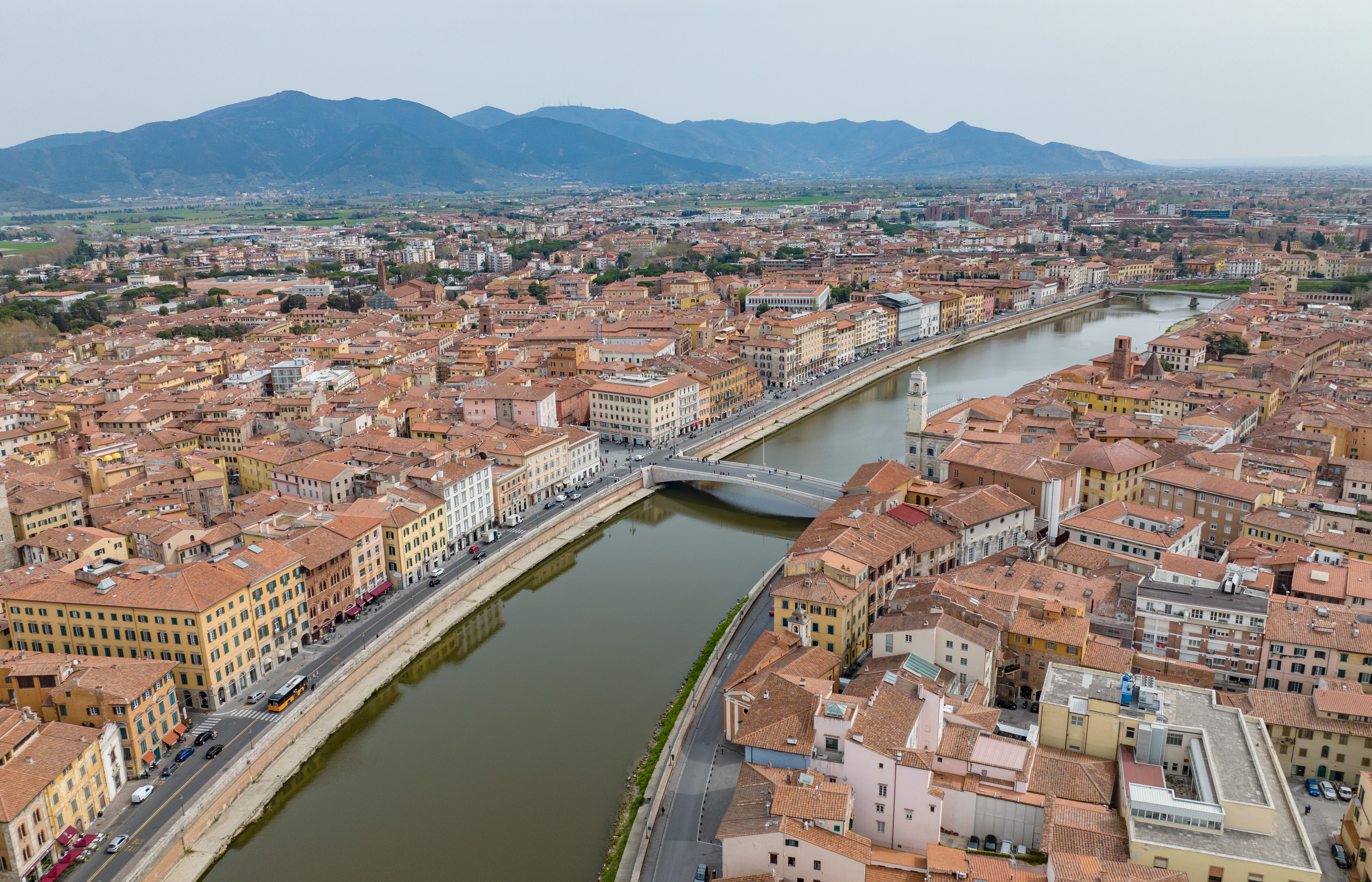
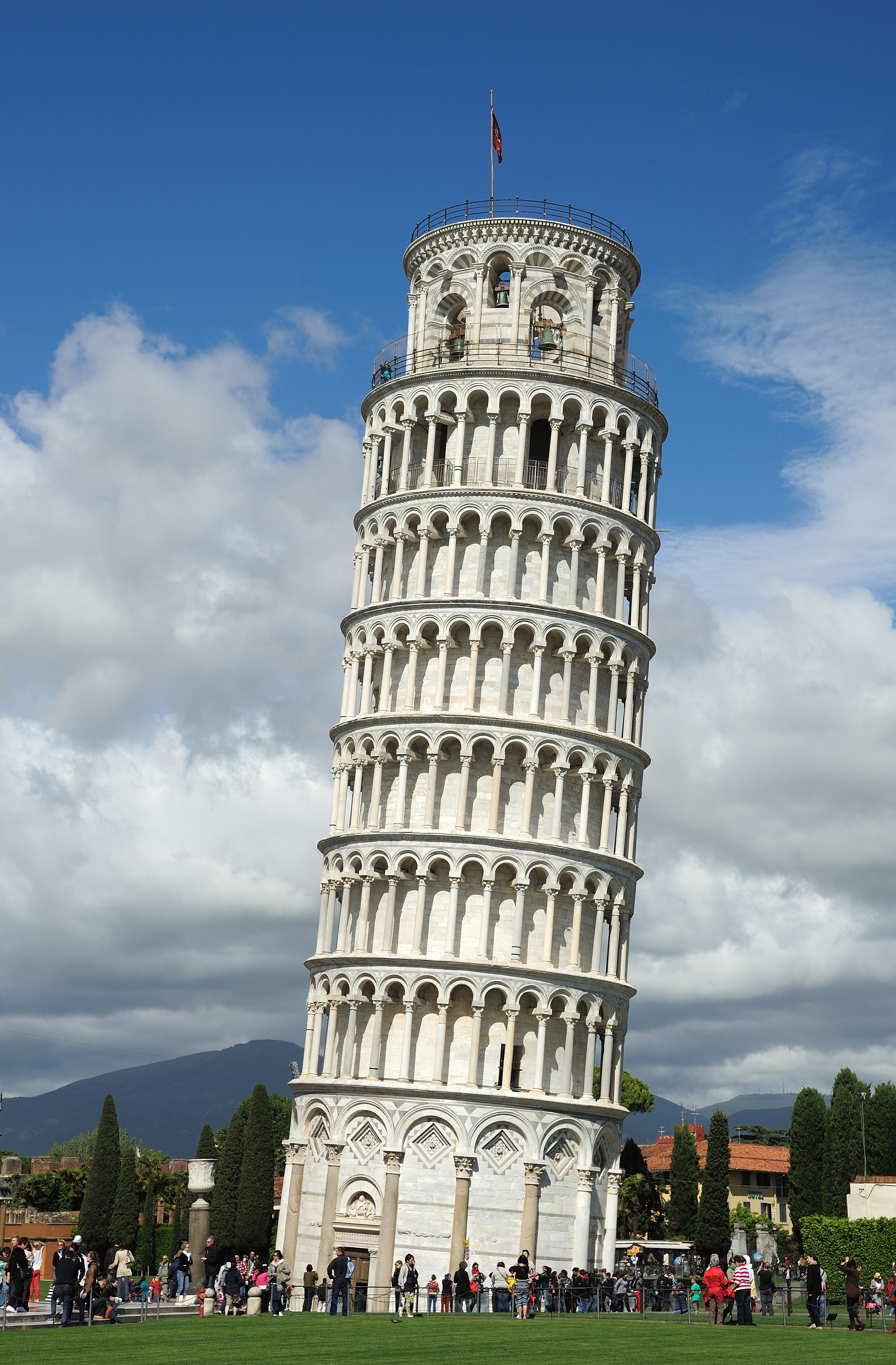
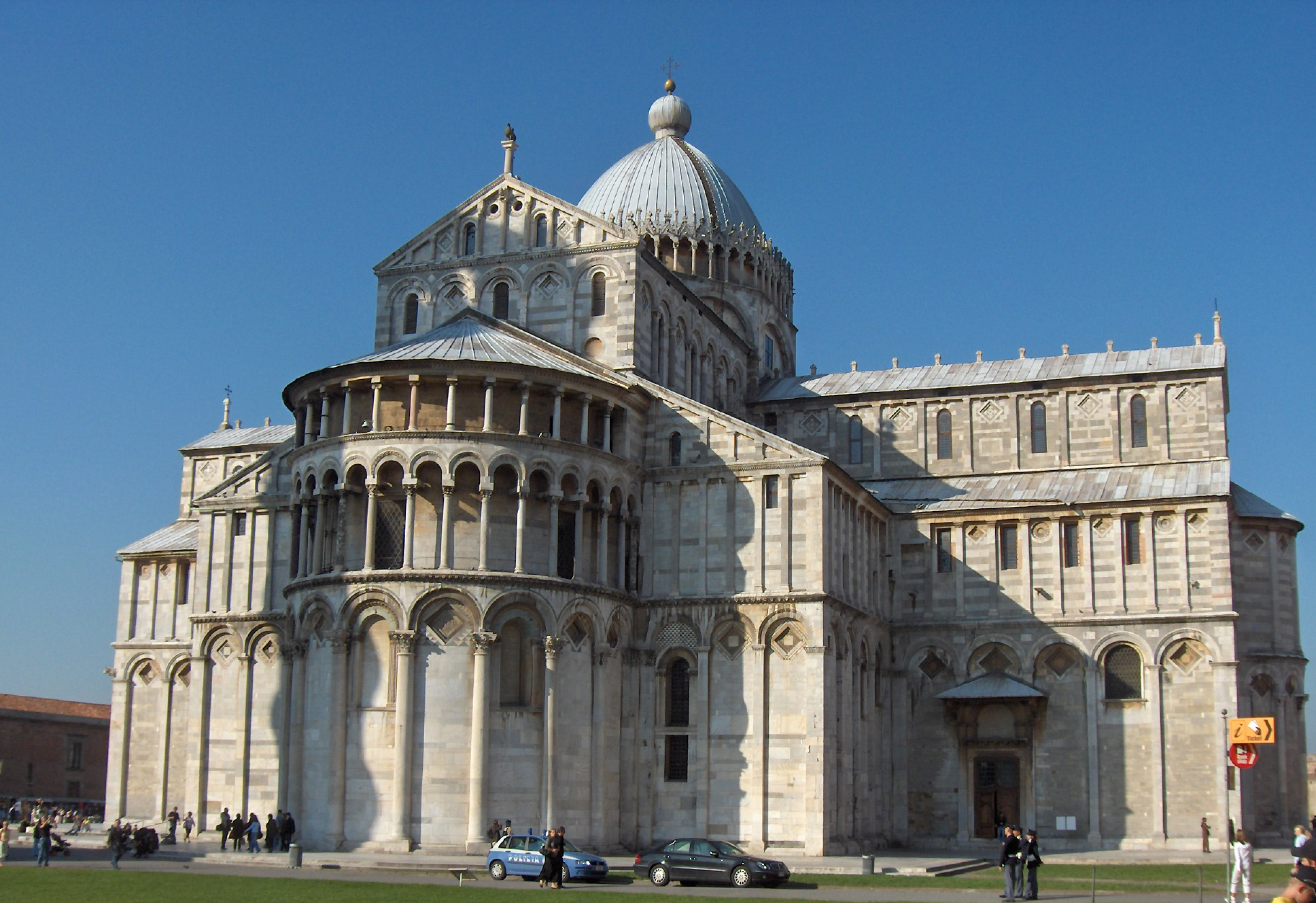
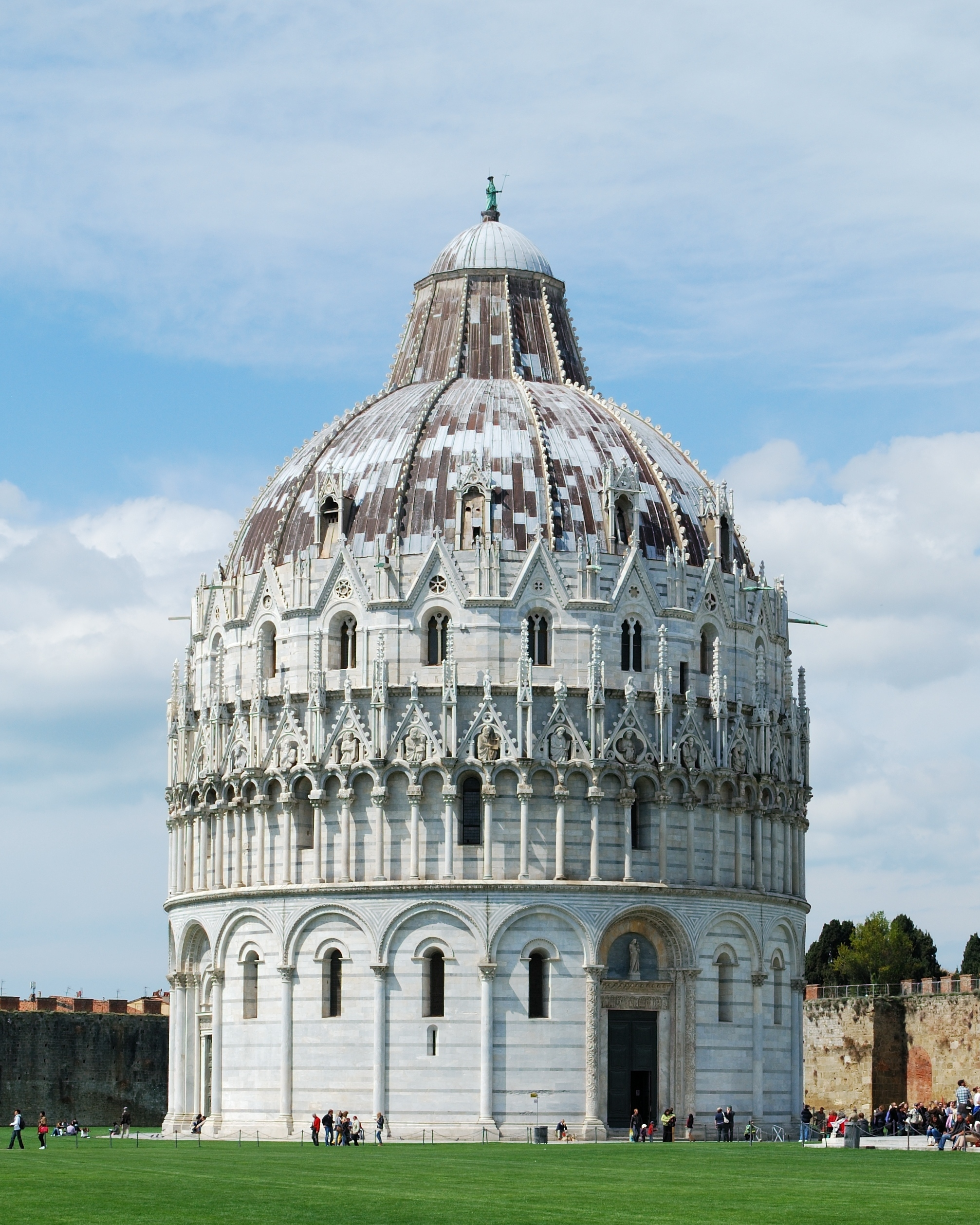
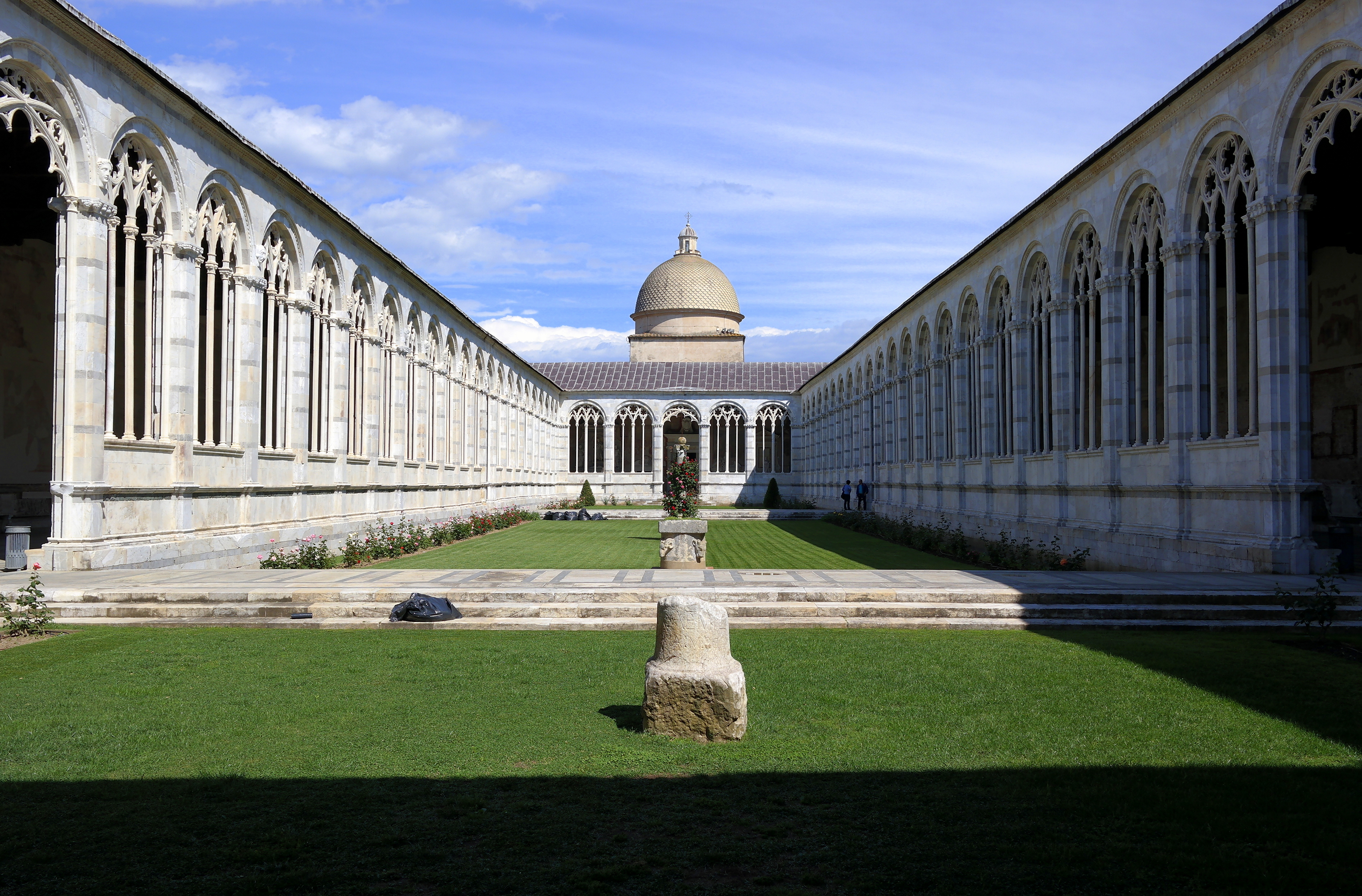
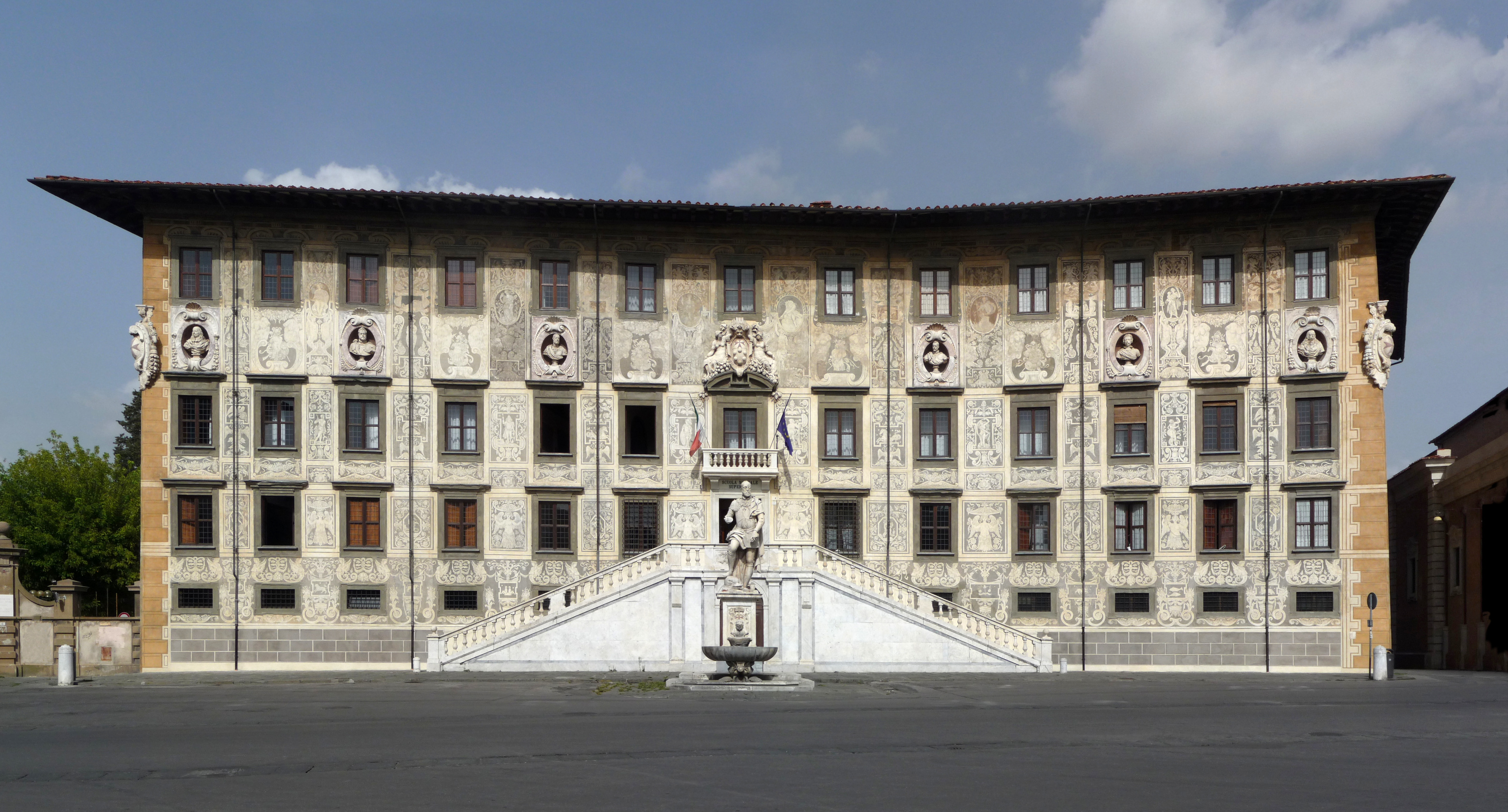
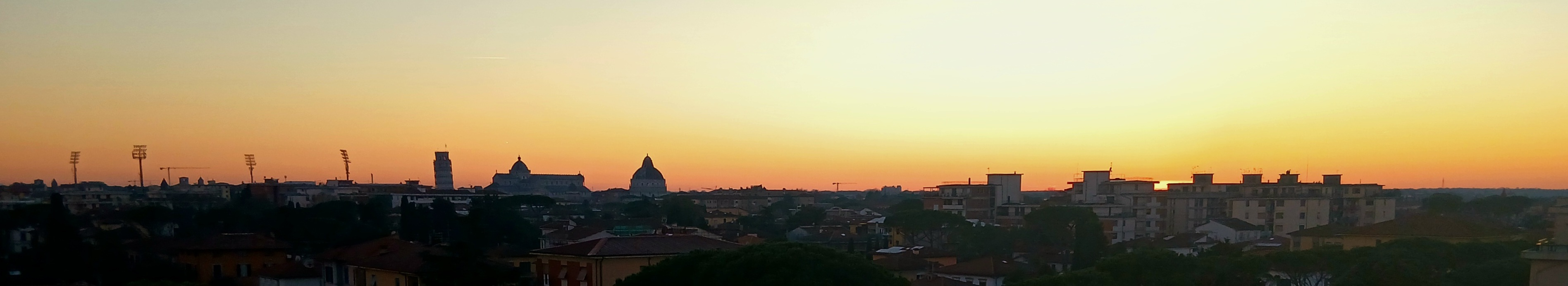
- Historic centre of Pisa on the Arno Leaning Tower of Pisa Pisa Cathedral Pisa Baptistery Camposanto Monumentale di Pisa Piazza dei Cavalieri Skyline of Pisa at sunset

- Flag Coat of arms

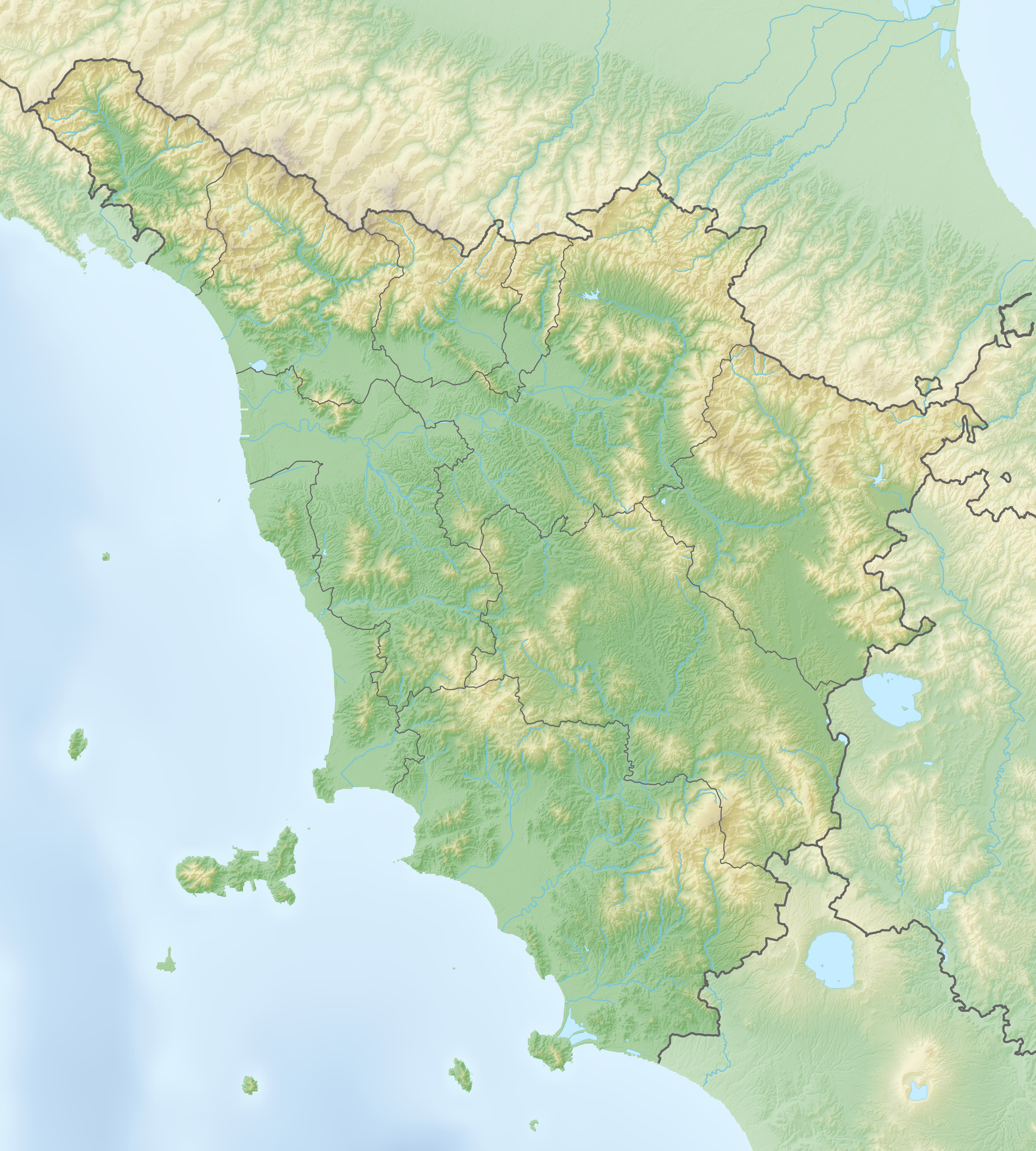
- Location within Italy Location within Tuscany
- Coordinates: 43°43′N 10°24′E
- Country: Italy
- Region: Tuscany
- Province: Pisa (PI)
- Frazioni: Calambrone, Coltano, Marina di Pisa, San Piero a Grado, Tirrenia

Government
  - Mayor: Michele Conti

Area
  - Total: 185 km^{2} (71 sq mi)
- Elevation: 4 m (13 ft)

Population (July 31, 2023)
  - Total: 98,778
  - Density: 534/km^{2} (1,380/sq mi)
- Demonym(s): Pisano; Pisan (English)
- Time zone: UTC+1 (CET)
  - Summer (DST): UTC+2 (CEST)
- Postal code: 56121–56128
- Dialing code: 050
- ISTAT code: 050026
- Patron saint: San Ranieri
- Saint day: June 17
- Website: Official website

Pisa (/ˈpiːzə/ PEE-zə; Italian: [ˈpiːza] or [ˈpiːsa]) is a city and comune (municipality) in Tuscany, Central Italy, straddling the Arno just before it empties into the Ligurian Sea. It is the capital city of the Province of Pisa. Although Pisa is known worldwide for the Leaning Tower of Pisa, the city contains more than twenty other historic churches, and several medieval and Renaissance palaces, mostly facing each other on the avenues along the Arno ("Lungarno"). Much of the city's architecture was financed from its history as one of the Italian maritime republics.

The city is also home to the University of Pisa, which has a history going back to the 12th century, the Scuola Normale Superiore di Pisa, founded by Napoleon in 1810, and its offshoot, the Sant'Anna School of Advanced Studies.

== History ==
=== Ancient times ===
Most believe the hypothesis that the origin of the name Pisa comes from Etruscan and means 'mouth', as Pisa is at the mouth of the Arno river.

Although throughout history there have been several uncertainties about the origin of the city of Pisa, excavations made in the 1980s and 1990s found numerous archaeological remains, including the fifth century BC tomb of an Etruscan prince, proving the Etruscan origin of the city, and its role as a maritime city, showing that it also maintained trade relations with other Mediterranean civilizations.

Ancient Roman authors referred to Pisa as an old city. Virgil, the ancient Roman poet of the Augustan period, who lived from 15 October 70 BC – 21 September 19 BC, in his Aeneid epic poem, states that Pisa was already a great center by the times described; and gives the epithet of Alphēae to the city because it was said to have been founded by colonists from Pisa in Elis, the western part of the Peloponnese peninsula of Greece, near which the Alpheius river flowed. The Virgilian commentator Servius wrote that the Teuti founded the town 13 centuries before the start of the common era.

The maritime role of Pisa should have been already prominent if the ancient authorities ascribed to it the invention of the naval ram. Pisa took advantage of being the only port along the western coast between Genoa (then a small village) and Ostia. Pisa served as a base for Roman naval expeditions against Ligurians and Gauls. In 180 BC, it became a Roman colony under Roman law, as Portus Pisanus. In 89 BC, Portus Pisanus became a municipium. Emperor Augustus fortified the colony into an important port and changed the name to Colonia Iulia obsequens.

Pisa supposedly was founded on the shore, but due to the alluvial sediments from the Arno and the Serchio, whose mouth lies about 11 km (7 mi) north of the Arno's, the shore moved west. Strabo states that the city was 4.0 km (2.5 mi) away from the coast. Currently, it is located 9.7 km (6 mi) from the coast. However, it was a maritime city, with ships sailing up the Arno. In the 90s AD, a baths complex was built in the city.

=== Late Antiquity and Early Middle Ages ===
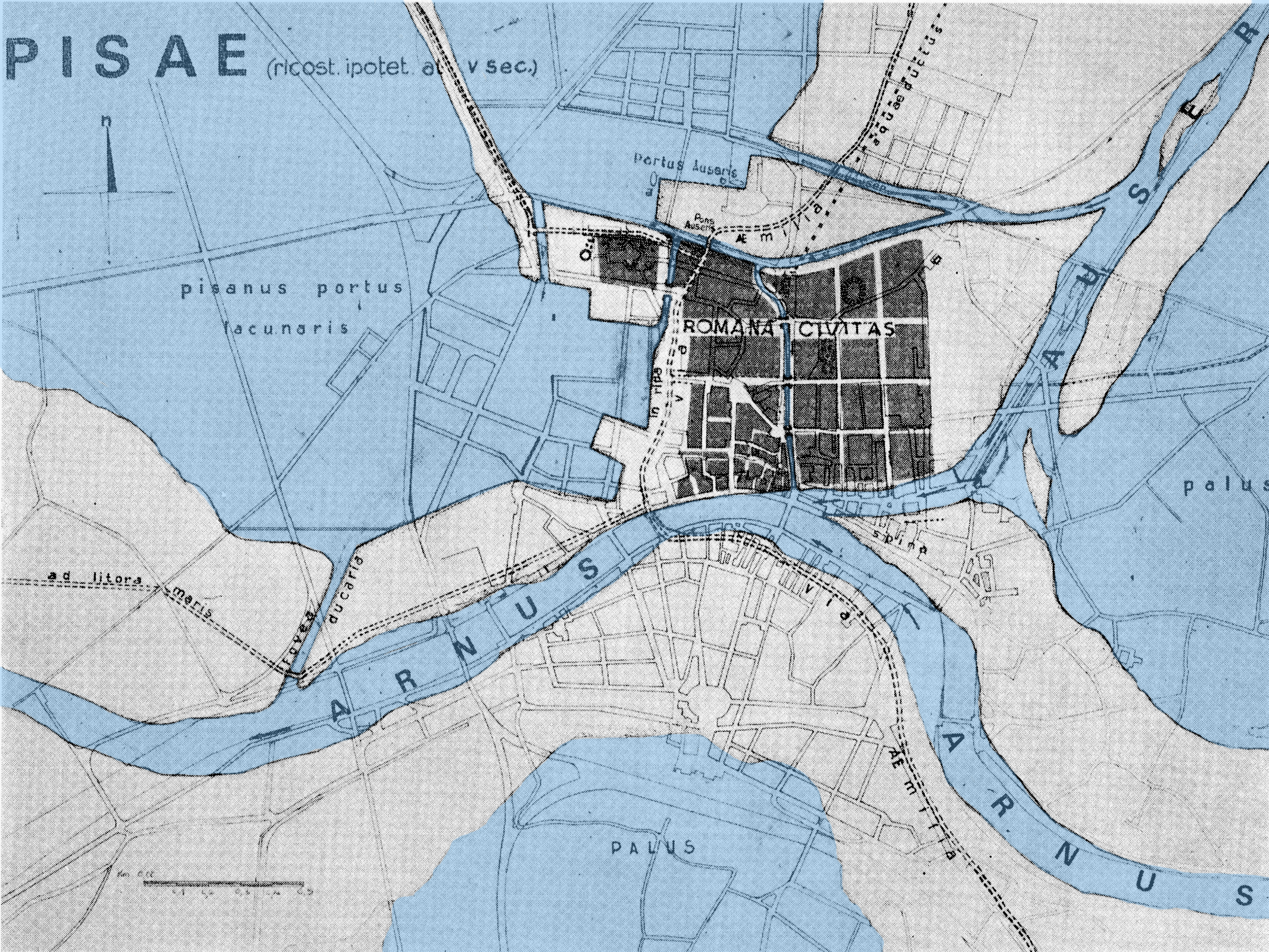
Hypothetical map of Pisa in the fifth century AD

During the last years of the Western Roman Empire, Pisa did not decline as much as the other cities of Italy, probably due to the complexity of its river system and its consequent ease of defence. Pisa was the sole Byzantine centre of Tuscia to fall peacefully in Lombard hands, through assimilation with the neighbouring region where their trading interests were prevalent. Pisa began in this way its rise to the role of main port of the Upper Tyrrhenian Sea and became the main trading centre between Tuscany and Corsica, Sardinia, and the southern coasts of France and Spain.

After Charlemagne had defeated the Lombards under the command of Desiderius in 774, Pisa went through a crisis, but soon recovered. Politically, it became part of the duchy of Lucca. In 860, Pisa was captured by vikings led by Björn Ironside. In 930, Pisa became the county centre (status it maintained until the arrival of Otto I) within the mark of Tuscia. Lucca was the capital but Pisa was the most important city, as in the middle of tenth century Liutprand of Cremona, bishop of Cremona, called Pisa Tusciae provinciae caput ("capital of the province of Tuscia"), and a century later, the marquis of Tuscia was commonly referred to as "marquis of Pisa". In 1003, Pisa was the protagonist of the first communal war in Italy, against Lucca. From the naval point of view, since the ninth century, the emergence of the Saracen pirates prompted the city to expand its fleet. In the following years, this fleet gave the town an opportunity for more expansion. In 828, Pisan ships assaulted the coast of North Africa. In 871, they took part in the defence of Salerno from the Saracens. In 970, they gave also strong support to Otto I's expedition, defeating a Byzantine fleet in front of Calabrese coasts.

=== 11th century ===
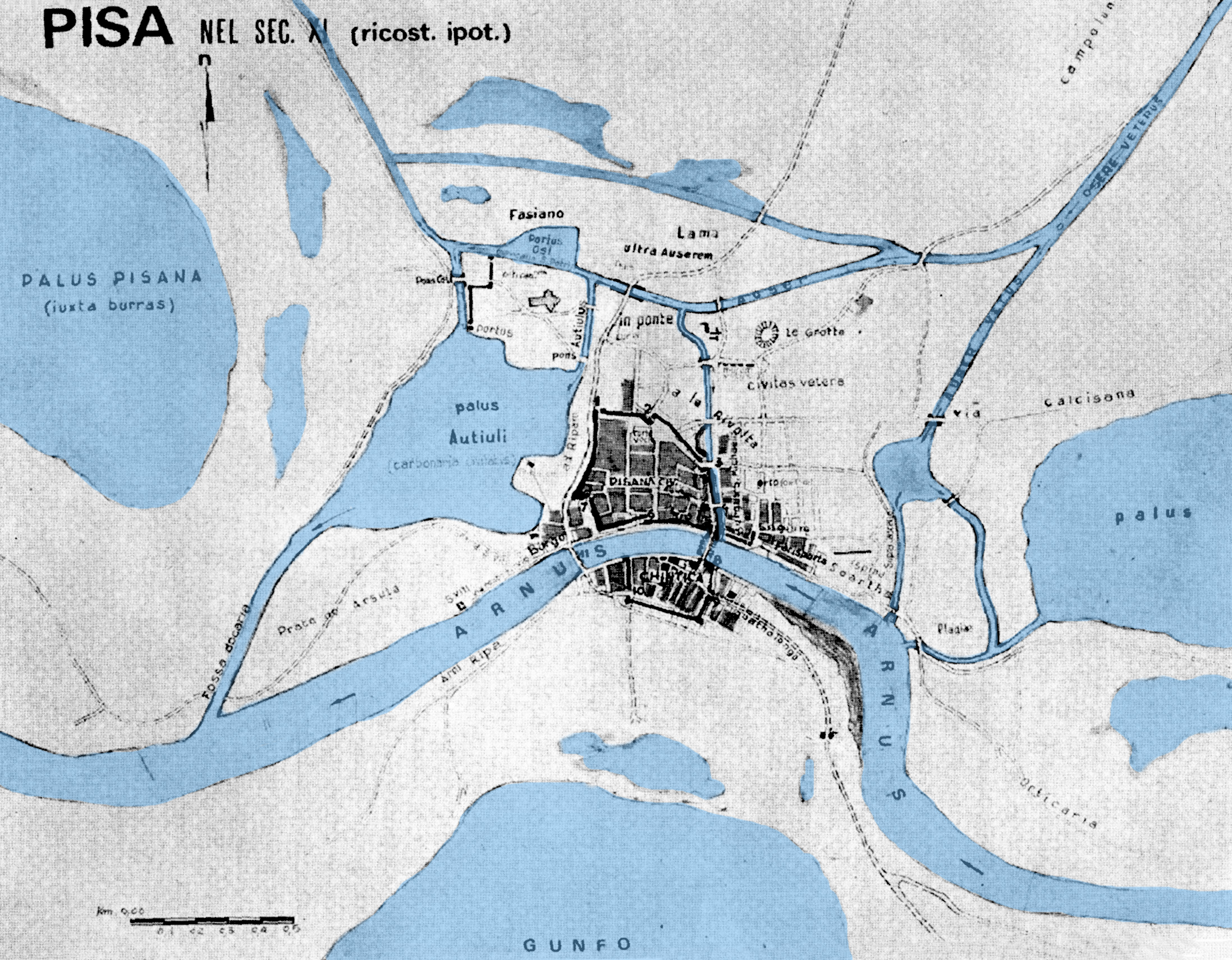
Hypothetical map of Pisa in the 11th century AD

The power of Pisa as a maritime nation began to grow and reached its apex in the 11th century, when it acquired traditional fame as one of the four main historical maritime republics of Italy (Repubbliche Marinare).

At that time, the city was a very important commercial centre and controlled a significant Mediterranean merchant fleet and navy. It expanded its powers in 1005 through the sack of Reggio Calabria in the south of Italy. Pisa, which was attacked in 1011, was in continuous conflict with some 'Saracens' - a medieval term to refer to Arab Muslims - who had their bases in Corsica. In 1017, Sardinian Giudicati were militarily supported by Pisa, in alliance with Genoa, to defeat the Saracen King Mugahid, who had settled a logistic base in the north of Sardinia the year before. This victory gave Pisa supremacy in the Tyrrhenian Sea. When the Pisans subsequently ousted the Genoese from Sardinia, a new conflict and rivalry was born between these major marine republics. Between 1030 and 1035, Pisa went on to defeat several rival towns in Sicily and conquer Carthage in North Africa. In 1051–1052, the admiral Jacopo Ciurini conquered Corsica, provoking more resentment from the Genoese. In 1063, Admiral Giovanni Orlandi, coming to the aid of the Norman Roger I, took Palermo from the Saracen pirates. The gold treasure taken from the Saracens in Palermo allowed the Pisans to start the building of their cathedral and the other monuments which constitute the famous Piazza del Duomo.

In 1060, Pisa engaged in its first battle with Genoa. The Pisan victory helped to consolidate its position in the Mediterranean. Pope Gregory VII recognised in 1077 the new "Laws and customs of the sea" instituted by the Pisans, and in 1081 Emperor Henry IV recognized their communal government. This was simply a confirmation of the present situation, because in those years, the marquis had already been excluded from power. In 1092, Pope Urban II awarded Pisa the supremacy over Corsica and Sardinia, and at the same time raising the town to the rank of archbishopric.

The Pisan fleet captured the Zirid city of Mahdia in 1087, securing a ransom from its ruler. Four years later, Pisan and Genoese ships helped Alfonso VI of Castilla to push El Cid out of Valencia. A Pisan fleet of 120 ships also took part in the First Crusade, and the Pisans were instrumental in the taking of Jerusalem in 1099. On their way to the Holy Land, the ships did not miss the occasion to sack some Byzantine islands; the Pisan crusaders were led by their archbishop Daibert, the future patriarch of Jerusalem. Pisa and the other Repubbliche Marinare took advantage of the crusade to establish trading posts and colonies in the Eastern coastal cities of the Levant. In particular, the Pisans founded colonies in Antiochia, Acre, Jaffa, Tripoli, Tyre, Latakia, and Accone. They also had other possessions in Jerusalem and Caesarea, plus smaller colonies (with lesser autonomy) in Cairo, Alexandria, and of course Constantinople, where the Byzantine Emperor Alexius I Comnenus granted them special mooring and trading rights. In all these cities, the Pisans were granted privileges and immunity from taxation, but had to contribute to the defence in case of attack. In the 12th century, the Pisan quarter in the eastern part of Constantinople had grown to 1,000 people. For some years of that century, Pisa was the most prominent commercial and military ally of the Byzantine Empire, overcoming Venice itself.

=== 12th century ===
In 1113, Pisa and Pope Paschal II set up, together with the count of Barcelona and other contingents from Provence and Italy (Genoese excluded), a war to free the Balearic Islands from the Moors; the queen and the king of Mallorca were brought in chains to Tuscany. Though the Almoravides soon reconquered the island, the booty taken helped the Pisans in their magnificent programme of buildings, especially the cathedral, and Pisa gained a role of pre-eminence in the Western Mediterranean.

In the following years, the powerful Pisan fleet, led by archbishop Pietro Moriconi, drove away the Saracens after ferocious battles. Though short-lived, this Pisan success in Spain increased the rivalry with Genoa. Pisa's trade with Languedoc, Provence (Noli, Savona, Fréjus, and Montpellier) were an obstacle to Genoese interests in cities such as Hyères, Fos, Antibes, and Marseille.

The war began in 1119 when the Genoese attacked several galleys on their way home to the motherland, and lasted until 1133. The two cities fought each other on land and at sea, but hostilities were limited to raids and pirate-like assaults.

In June 1135, Bernard of Clairvaux took a leading part in the Council of Pisa, asserting the claims of Pope Innocent II against those of Pope Anacletus II, who had been elected pope in 1130 with Norman support, but was not recognised outside Rome. Innocent II resolved the conflict with Genoa, establishing Pisan and Genoese spheres of influence. Pisa could then, unhindered by Genoa, participate in the conflict of Innocent II against king Roger II of Sicily. Amalfi, one of the maritime republics (though already declining under Norman rule), was conquered on August 6, 1136; the Pisans destroyed the ships in the port, assaulted the castles in the surrounding areas, and drove back an army sent by Roger from Aversa. This victory brought Pisa to the peak of its power and to a standing equal to Venice. Two years later, its soldiers sacked Salerno.

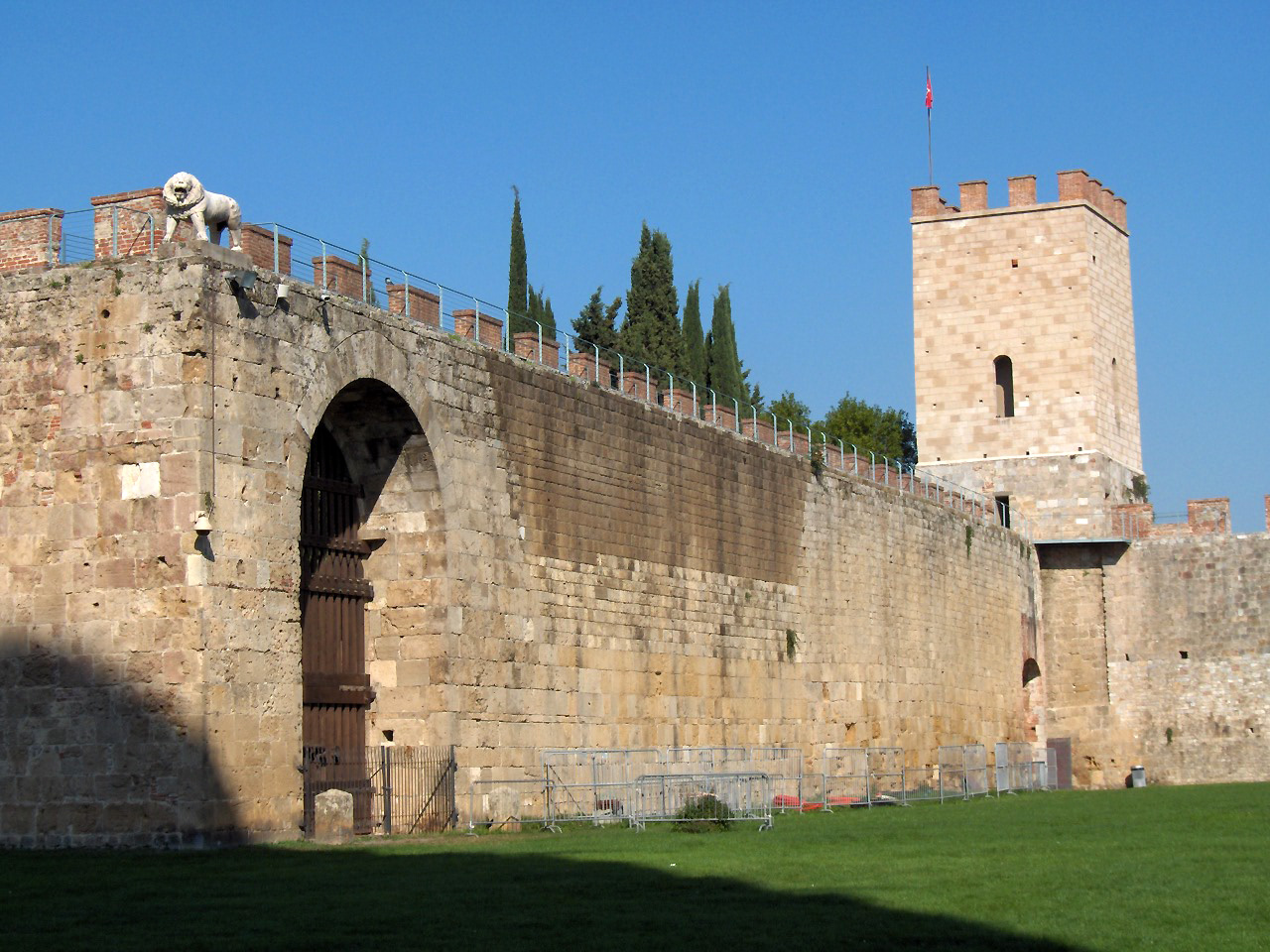
New city walls, erected in 1156 by Consul Cocco Griffi

In the following years, Pisa was one of the staunchest supporters of the Ghibelline party. This was much appreciated by Frederick I. He issued in 1162 and 1165 two important documents, with these grants: Apart from the jurisdiction over the Pisan countryside, the Pisans were granted freedom of trade in the whole empire, the coast from Civitavecchia to Portovenere, a half of Palermo, Messina, Salerno and Naples, the whole of Gaeta, Mazara, and Trapani, and a street with houses for its merchants in every city of the Kingdom of Sicily. Some of these grants were later confirmed by Henry VI, Otto IV, and Frederick II. They marked the apex of Pisa's power, but also spurred the resentment of other cities such as Lucca, Massa, Volterra, and Florence, thwarting their aim to expand towards the sea. The clash with Lucca also concerned the possession of the castle of Montignoso and mainly the control of the Via Francigena, the main trade route between Rome and France. Last, but not least, such a sudden and large increase of power by Pisa could only lead to another war with Genoa.

Genoa had acquired a dominant position in the markets of southern France. The war began in 1165 on the Rhône, when an attack on a convoy, directed to some Pisan trade centres on the river, by the Genoese and their ally, the count of Toulouse, failed. Pisa, though, was allied to Provence. The war continued until 1175 without significant victories. Another point of attrition was Sicily, where both the cities had privileges granted by Henry VI. In 1192, Pisa managed to conquer Messina. This episode was followed by a series of battles culminating in the Genoese conquest of Syracuse in 1204. Later, the trading posts in Sicily were lost when the new Pope Innocent III, though removing the excommunication cast over Pisa by his predecessor Celestine III, allied himself with the Guelph League of Tuscany, led by Florence. Soon, he stipulated a pact with Genoa, too, further weakening the Pisan presence in southern Italy.

To counter the Genoese predominance in the southern Tyrrhenian Sea, Pisa strengthened its relationship with its traditional Spanish and French bases (Marseille, Narbonne, Barcelona, etc.) and tried to defy the Venetian rule of the Adriatic Sea. In 1180, the two cities agreed to a nonaggression treaty in the Tyrrhenian and the Adriatic, but the death of Emperor Manuel Comnenus in Constantinople changed the situation. Soon, attacks on Venetian convoys were made. Pisa signed trade and political pacts with Ancona, Pula, Zara, Split, and Brindisi; in 1195, a Pisan fleet reached Pola to defend its independence from Venice, but the Serenissima soon reconquered the rebel sea town.

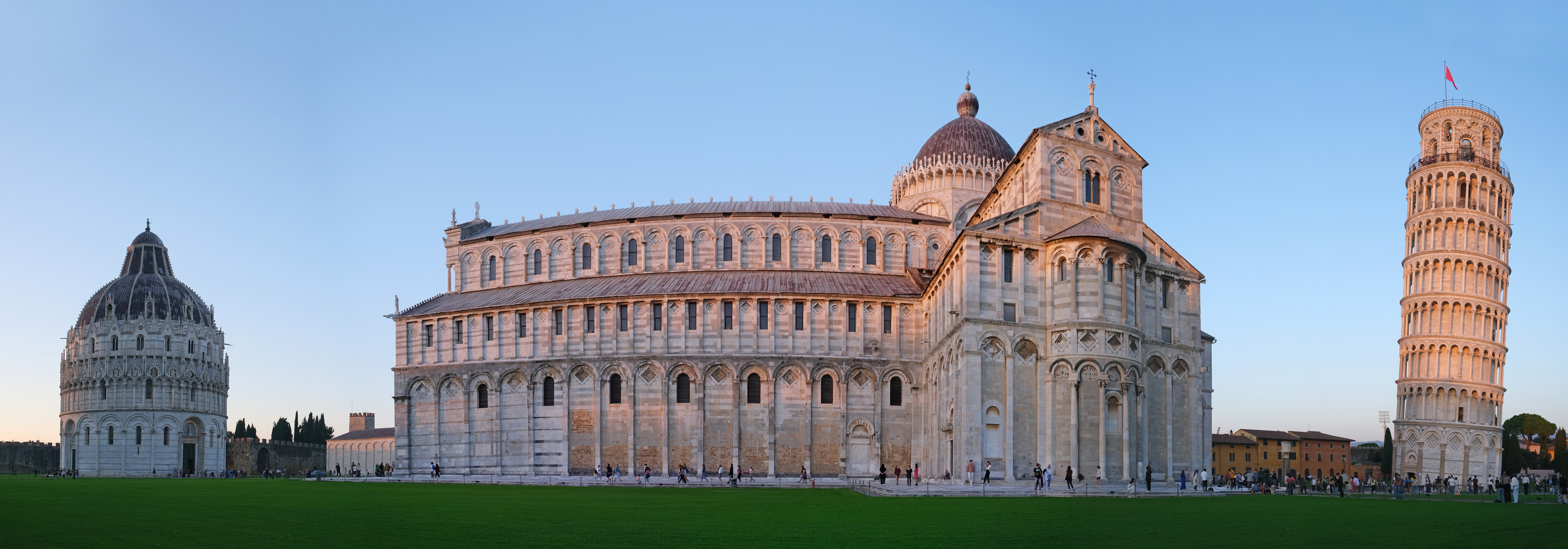
View of the Piazza dei Miracoli

One year later, the two cities signed a peace treaty, which resulted in favourable conditions for Pisa, but in 1199, the Pisans violated it by blockading the port of Brindisi in Apulia. In the following naval battle, they were defeated by the Venetians. The war that followed ended in 1206 with a treaty in which Pisa gave up all its hopes to expand in the Adriatic, though it maintained the trading posts it had established in the area. From that point on, the two cities were united against the rising power of Genoa and sometimes collaborated to increase the trading benefits in Constantinople.

=== 13th century ===
In 1209 in Lerici, two councils for a final resolution of the rivalry with Genoa were held. A 20-year peace treaty was signed, but when in 1220, the emperor Frederick II confirmed his supremacy over the Tyrrhenian coast from Civitavecchia to Portovenere, the Genoese and Tuscan resentment against Pisa grew again. In the following years, Pisa clashed with Lucca in Garfagnana and was defeated by the Florentines at Castel del Bosco. The strong Ghibelline position of Pisa brought this town diametrically against the Pope, who was in a dispute with the Holy Roman Empire, and indeed the pope tried to deprive Pisa of its dominions in northern Sardinia.

In 1238, Pope Gregory IX formed an alliance between Genoa and Venice against the empire, and consequently against Pisa, too. One year later, he excommunicated Frederick II and called for an anti-Empire council to be held in Rome in 1241. On May 3, 1241, a combined fleet of Pisan and Sicilian ships, led by the emperor's son Enzo, attacked a Genoese convoy carrying prelates from northern Italy and France, next to the isle of Giglio (Battle of Giglio), in front of Tuscany; the Genoese lost 25 ships, while about a thousand sailors, two cardinals, and one bishop were taken prisoner. After this major victory, the council in Rome failed, but Pisa was excommunicated. This extreme measure was only removed in 1257. Anyway, the Tuscan city tried to take advantage of the favourable situation to conquer the Corsican city of Aleria and even lay siege to Genoa itself in 1243.

The Ligurian republic of Genoa, however, recovered fast from this blow and won back Lerici, conquered by the Pisans some years earlier, in 1256.

The great expansion in the Mediterranean and the prominence of the merchant class urged a modification in the city's institutes. The system with consuls was abandoned, and in 1230, the new city rulers named a capitano del popolo ("people's chieftain") as civil and military leader. Despite these reforms, the conquered lands and the city itself were harassed by the rivalry between the two families of Della Gherardesca and Visconti. In 1237 the archbishop and the Emperor Frederick II intervened to reconcile the two rivals, but the strains continued. In 1254, the people rebelled and imposed 12 Anziani del Popolo ("People's Elders") as their political representatives in the commune. They also supplemented the legislative councils, formed of noblemen, with new People's Councils, composed by the main guilds and by the chiefs of the People's Companies. These had the power to ratify the laws of the Major General Council and the Senate.

=== Decline ===
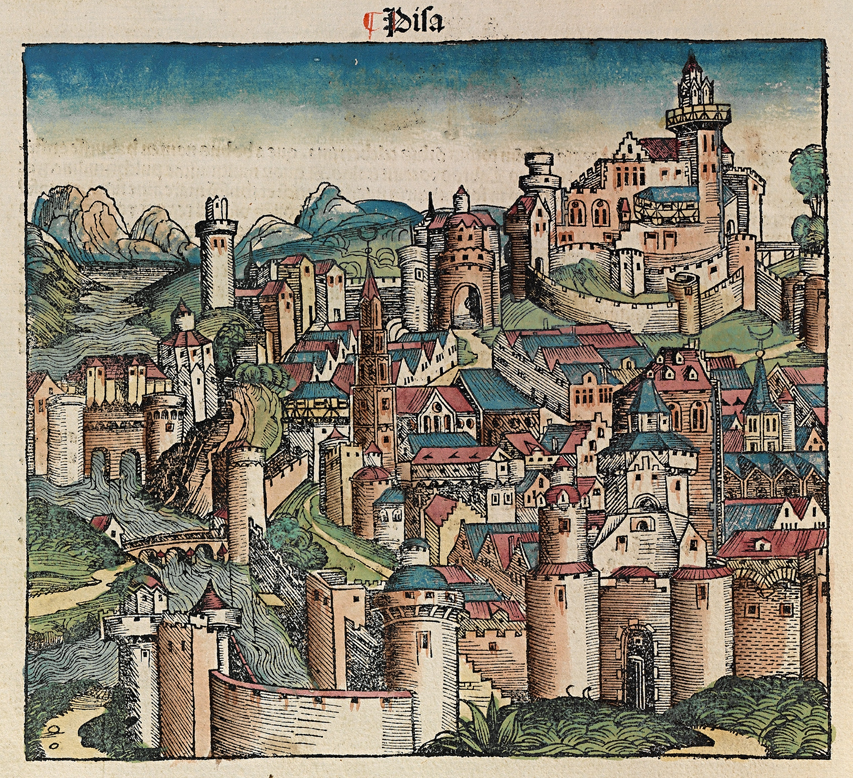
Idealized depiction of Pisa from the 1493 Nuremberg Chronicle.

The decline is said to have begun on August 6, 1284, when the numerically superior fleet of Pisa, under the command of Albertino Morosini, was defeated by the brilliant tactics of the Genoese fleet, under the command of Benedetto Zaccaria and Oberto Doria, in the dramatic naval Battle of Meloria. This defeat ended the maritime power of Pisa and the town never fully recovered; in 1290, the Genoese destroyed forever the Porto Pisano (Pisa's port), and covered the land with salt. The region around Pisa did not permit the city to recover from the loss of thousands of sailors from the Meloria, while Liguria guaranteed enough sailors to Genoa. Goods, however, continued to be traded, albeit in reduced quantity, but the end came when the Arno started to change course, preventing the galleys from reaching the city's port up the river. The nearby area also likely became infested with malaria. The true end came in 1324, when Sardinia was entirely lost to the Aragonese.

Always Ghibelline, Pisa tried to build up its power in the course of the 14th century, and even managed to defeat Florence in the Battle of Montecatini (1315), under the command of Uguccione della Faggiuola. Eventually, however, after a long siege, Pisa was occupied by Florentines in 1405. Florentines corrupted the capitano del popolo ("people's chieftain"), Giovanni Gambacorta, who at night opened the city gate of San Marco. Pisa was never conquered by an army. In 1409, Pisa was the seat of a council trying to set the question of the Great Schism. In the 15th century, access to the sea became more difficult, as the port was silting up and was cut off from the sea. When in 1494, Charles VIII of France invaded the Italian states to claim the Kingdom of Naples, Pisa reclaimed its independence as the Second Pisan Republic.

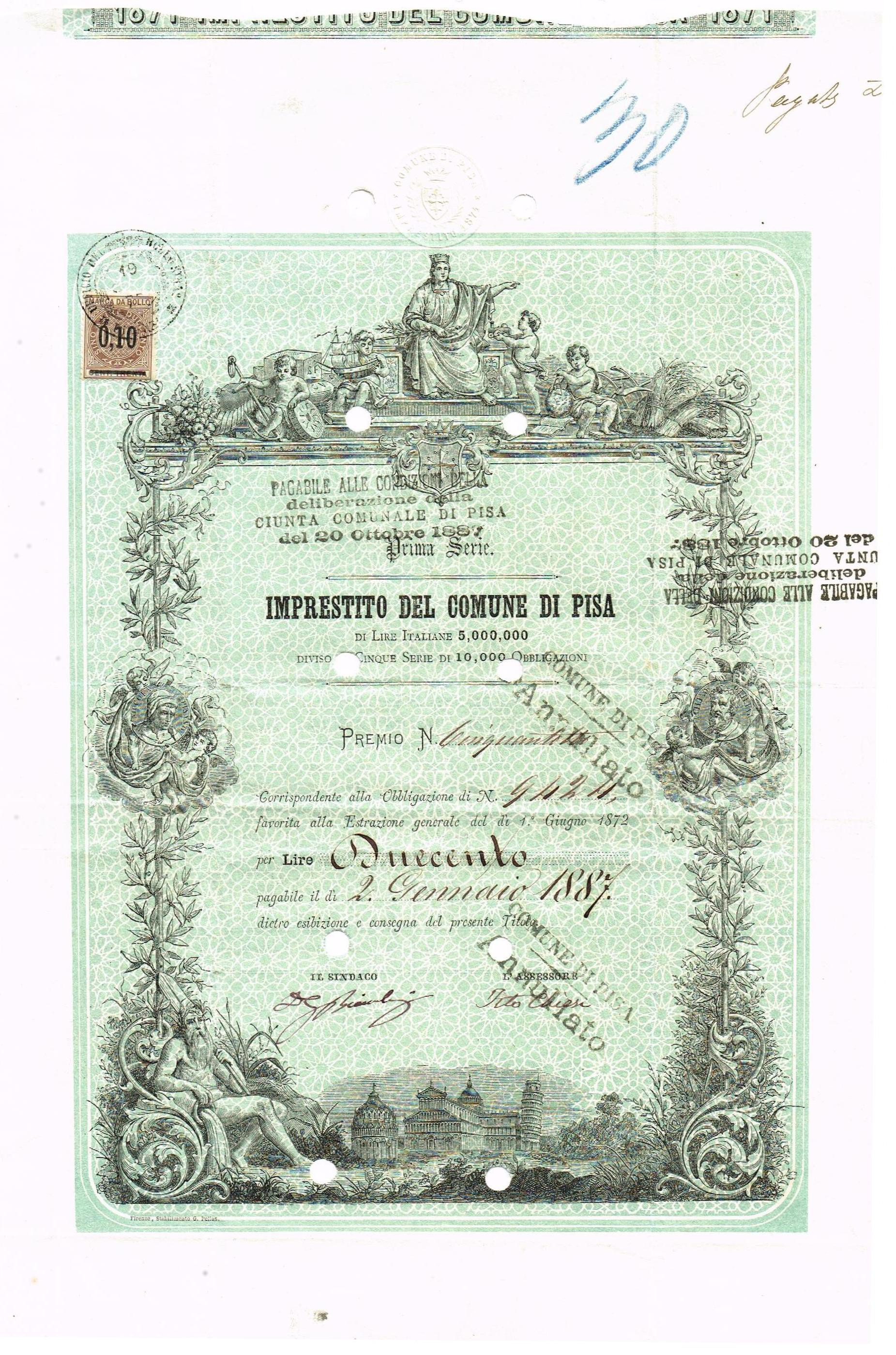
Bonus certificate of Pisa, issued July 19, 1875

The new freedom did not last long; 15 years of battles and sieges by the Florentine troops led by Antonio da Filicaja, Averardo Salviati and Niccolò Capponi were made, but they failed to conquer the city. Vitellozzo Vitelli with his brother Paolo were the only ones who actually managed to break the strong defences of Pisa and make a breach in the Stampace bastion in the southern west part of the walls, but he did not enter the city. For that, they were suspected of treachery and Paolo was put to death. However, the resources of Pisa were getting low, and at the end, the city was sold to the Visconti family from Milan and eventually to Florence again. Livorno took over the role of the main port of Tuscany. Pisa acquired a mainly cultural role spurred by the presence of the University of Pisa, created in 1343, later reinforced by the Scuola Normale Superiore di Pisa, founded in 1810 with a decree by Napoleon, and more recently by Sant'Anna School of Advanced Studies (1987).

For fourteen years between 1801 and 1815, Tuscany came under French and Spanish domination. In 1801, the region became the Kingdom of Etruria, created from the Grand Duchy of Tuscany under the Treaty of Aranjuez, ruled by King Louis I of Etruria, a cousin of the King of Spain, as part of a larger agreement between Napoleonic France and Spain. However, after only six years, in 1807, Napoleon dissolved the kingdom and integrated it into France, with Pisa being within the new French department of Méditerranée. But only eight years later, after the final total defeat of Napoleon in 1814, the department was disbanded in 1815, under the terms of the Congress of Vienna, and the Grand Duchy of Tuscany was restored to its previous Habsburg-Lorraine prince, Ferdinand III.

Pisa was the birthplace of the important early physicist Galileo Galilei. It is still the seat of an archbishopric. Besides its educational institutions, it has become a light industrial centre and a railway hub. It suffered repeated destruction during World War II.

Since the early 1950s, the US Army has maintained Camp Darby just outside Pisa, which is used by many US military personnel as a base for vacations in the area.

== Geography ==
=== Climate ===
Pisa has a borderline humid subtropical climate (Köppen climate classification: Cfa) and Mediterranean climate (Köppen climate classification: Csa). The city is characterized by cool to mild winters and hot summers. This transitional climate allows Pisa to have summers with moderate rainfall. Rainfall peaks in autumn. Snow is rare. The highest officially recorded temperature was 39.5 °C (103.1 °F) on 22 August 2011 and the lowest was −13.8 °C (7.2 °F) on 12 January 1985.

Climate data for Pisa (1991–2020 normals)
Month	Jan	Feb	Mar	Apr	May	Jun	Jul	Aug	Sep	Oct	Nov	Dec	Year
Record high °C (°F)	17.6 (63.7)	21.0 (69.8)	24.0 (75.2)	27.9 (82.2)	30.9 (87.6)	35.0 (95.0)	37.8 (100.0)	39.5 (103.1)	36.2 (97.2)	30.2 (86.4)	24.0 (75.2)	20.4 (68.7)	39.5 (103.1)
Mean daily maximum °C (°F)	11.5 (52.7)	12.6 (54.7)	15.5 (59.9)	18.5 (65.3)	22.7 (72.9)	27.0 (80.6)	29.9 (85.8)	30.3 (86.5)	26.1 (79.0)	21.3 (70.3)	16.0 (60.8)	12.1 (53.8)	20.3 (68.5)
Daily mean °C (°F)	6.9 (44.4)	7.4 (45.3)	10.2 (50.4)	13.0 (55.4)	17.1 (62.8)	21.2 (70.2)	23.9 (75.0)	24.2 (75.6)	20.2 (68.4)	16.1 (61.0)	11.6 (52.9)	7.7 (45.9)	15.0 (58.9)
Mean daily minimum °C (°F)	2.8 (37.0)	2.8 (37.0)	5.2 (41.4)	7.8 (46.0)	11.5 (52.7)	15.3 (59.5)	17.8 (64.0)	18.5 (65.3)	14.9 (58.8)	11.7 (53.1)	7.8 (46.0)	3.9 (39.0)	10.0 (50.0)
Record low °C (°F)	−13.8 (7.2)	−8.4 (16.9)	−8.2 (17.2)	−3.2 (26.2)	2.8 (37.0)	5.8 (42.4)	8.8 (47.8)	8.2 (46.8)	3.8 (38.8)	0.3 (32.5)	−7.2 (19.0)	−7.2 (19.0)	−13.8 (7.2)
Average precipitation mm (inches)	68.0 (2.68)	63.1 (2.48)	60.0 (2.36)	64.9 (2.56)	61.7 (2.43)	41.1 (1.62)	31.9 (1.26)	40.6 (1.60)	100.3 (3.95)	128.7 (5.07)	131.1 (5.16)	87.7 (3.45)	879.1 (34.62)
Average precipitation days (≥ 1.0 mm)	6.9	7.2	6.3	7.6	6.6	4.4	2.2	2.6	6.5	8.6	10.4	9.3	78.6
Average relative humidity (%)	75.2	71.9	70.9	72.5	72.0	70.6	68.4	68.9	70.3	75.0	77.9	76.8	72.5
Average dew point °C (°F)	3.0 (37.4)	2.9 (37.2)	5.2 (41.4)	8.4 (47.1)	12.2 (54.0)	15.7 (60.3)	17.7 (63.9)	18.2 (64.8)	14.9 (58.8)	12.2 (54.0)	8.2 (46.8)	4.1 (39.4)	10.2 (50.4)
Mean monthly sunshine hours	113.2	128.4	166.3	180.8	240.9	264.9	314.5	286.8	216.1	158.1	115.0	100.7	2,285.7
Source: NOAA, (Sun for 1981-2010)

== Culture ==
=== Gioco del Ponte ===
In Pisa there was a festival and game Gioco del Ponte (Game of the Bridge) which was celebrated (in some form) in Pisa from perhaps the 1200s down to 1807. From the end of the 1400s the game took the form of a mock battle fought upon Pisa's central bridge (Ponte di Mezzo). The participants wore quilted armor and the only offensive weapon allowed was the targone, a shield-shaped, stout board with precisely specified dimensions. Hitting below the belt was not allowed. Two opposing teams started at opposite ends of the bridge. The object of the two opposing teams was to penetrate, drive back, and disperse the opponents' ranks and to thereby drive them backwards off the bridge. The struggle was limited to forty-five minutes. Victory or defeat was immensely important to the team players and their partisans, but sometimes the game was fought to a draw and both sides celebrated.

In 1677 the battle was witnessed by Dutch travelling artist Cornelis de Bruijn. He wrote:

"While I stayed in Livorno, I went to Pisa to witness the bridge fight there. The fighters arrived fully armored, wearing helmets, each carrying their banner, which was planted at both ends of the bridge, which is quite wide and long. The battle is fought with certain wooden implements made for this purpose, which they wear over their arms and are attached to them, with which they pummel each other so intensely that I saw several of them carried away with bloody and crushed heads. Victory consists of capturing the bridge, in the same way as the fistfights in Venice between the it:Castellani and the Nicolotti."

In 1927 the tradition was revived by college students as an elaborate costume parade. In 1935 Vittorio Emanuele III with the royal family witnessed the first revival of a modern version of the game, which has been pursued in the 20th and 21st centuries with some interruptions and varying degrees of enthusiasm by Pisans and their civic institutions.

=== Festivals and cultural events ===
- Capodanno pisano (folklore, March 25)
- Gioco del Ponte (folklore)
- Luminara di San Ranieri (folklore, June 16)
- Maritime republics regata (folklore)
- Premio Nazionale Letterario Pisa
- Pisa Book Festival
- Metarock (rock music festival)
- Internet Festival San Ranieri regata (folklore)
- Pisa Gospel Festival (Spiritual and Gospel music festival held in autumn)
- Turn Off Festival (house music festival)
- Nessiáh (Jewish cultural Festival, November)

== Population ==
Historical population

Year	Pop.	±%
1861	43,835	—
1871	49,810	+13.6%
1881	53,620	+7.6%
1901	60,326	+12.5%
1911	64,575	+7.0%
1921	67,237	+4.1%
1931	70,550	+4.9%
1936	72,468	+2.7%

Year	Pop.	±%
1951	77,722	+7.3%
1961	90,928	+17.0%
1971	103,415	+13.7%
1981	104,509	+1.1%
1991	98,928	−5.3%
2001	89,694	−9.3%
2011	85,858	−4.3%
2021	89,002	+3.7%

Source: ISTAT

== Main sights ==
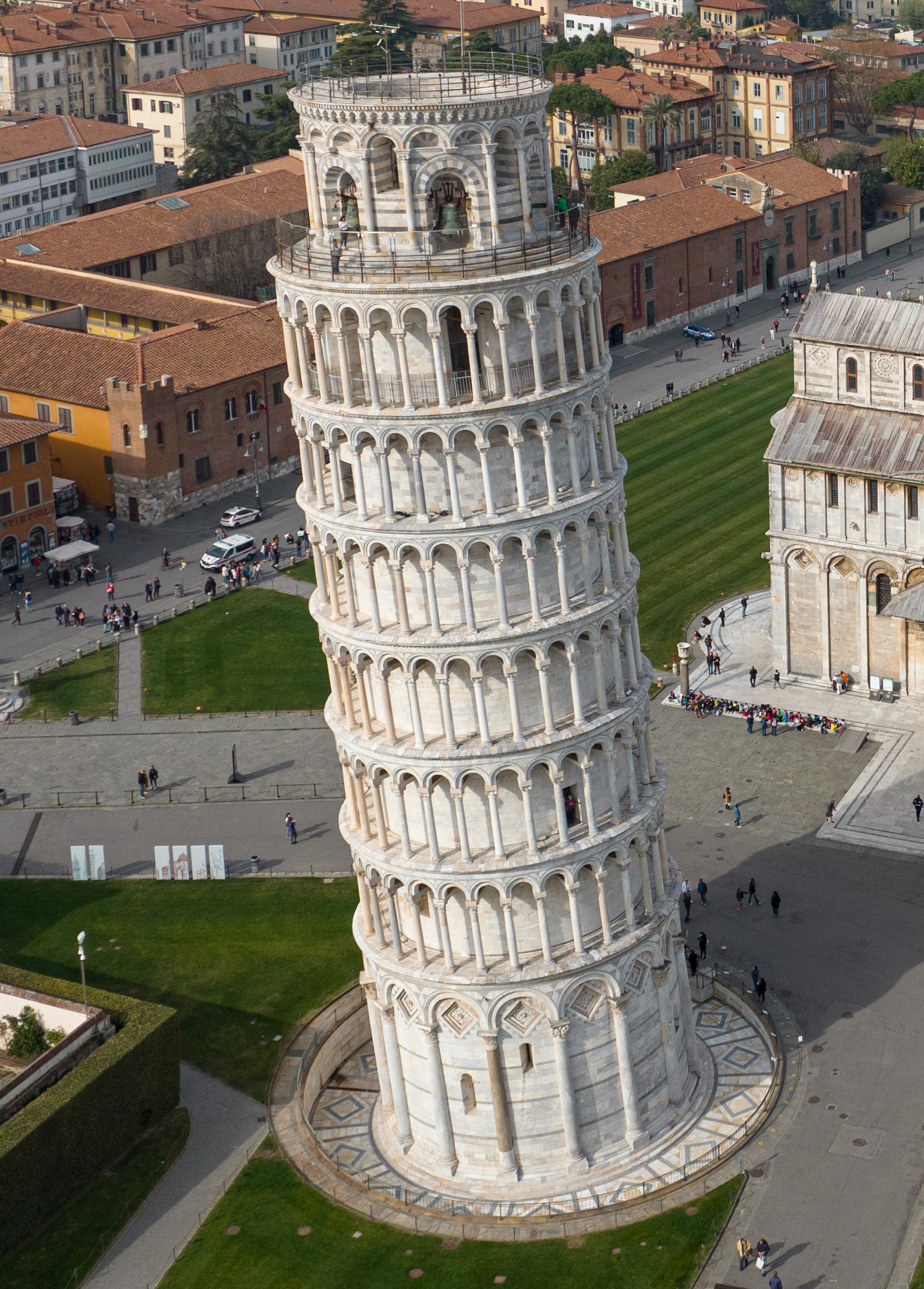
The Leaning Tower of Pisa

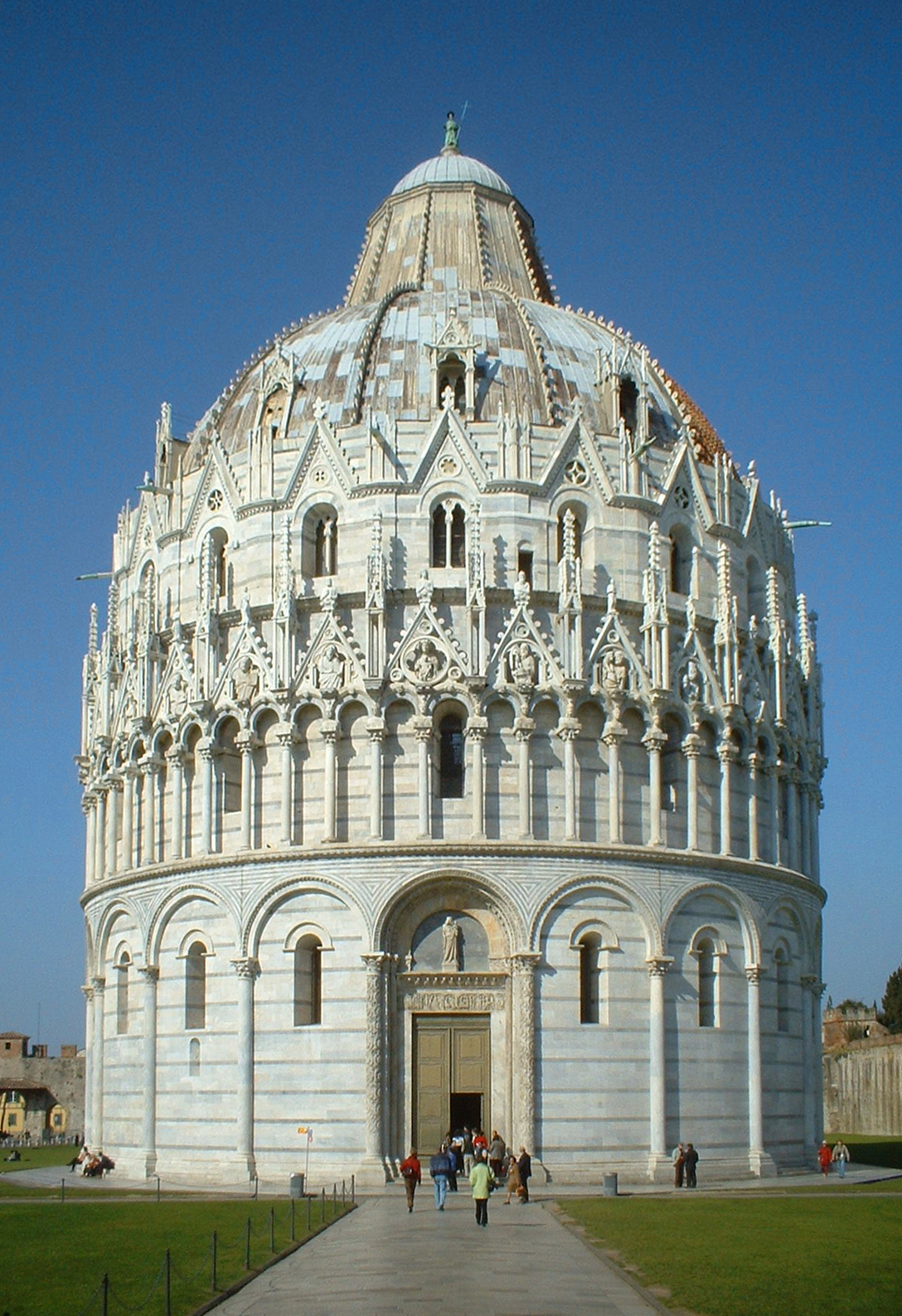
Pisa Baptistery

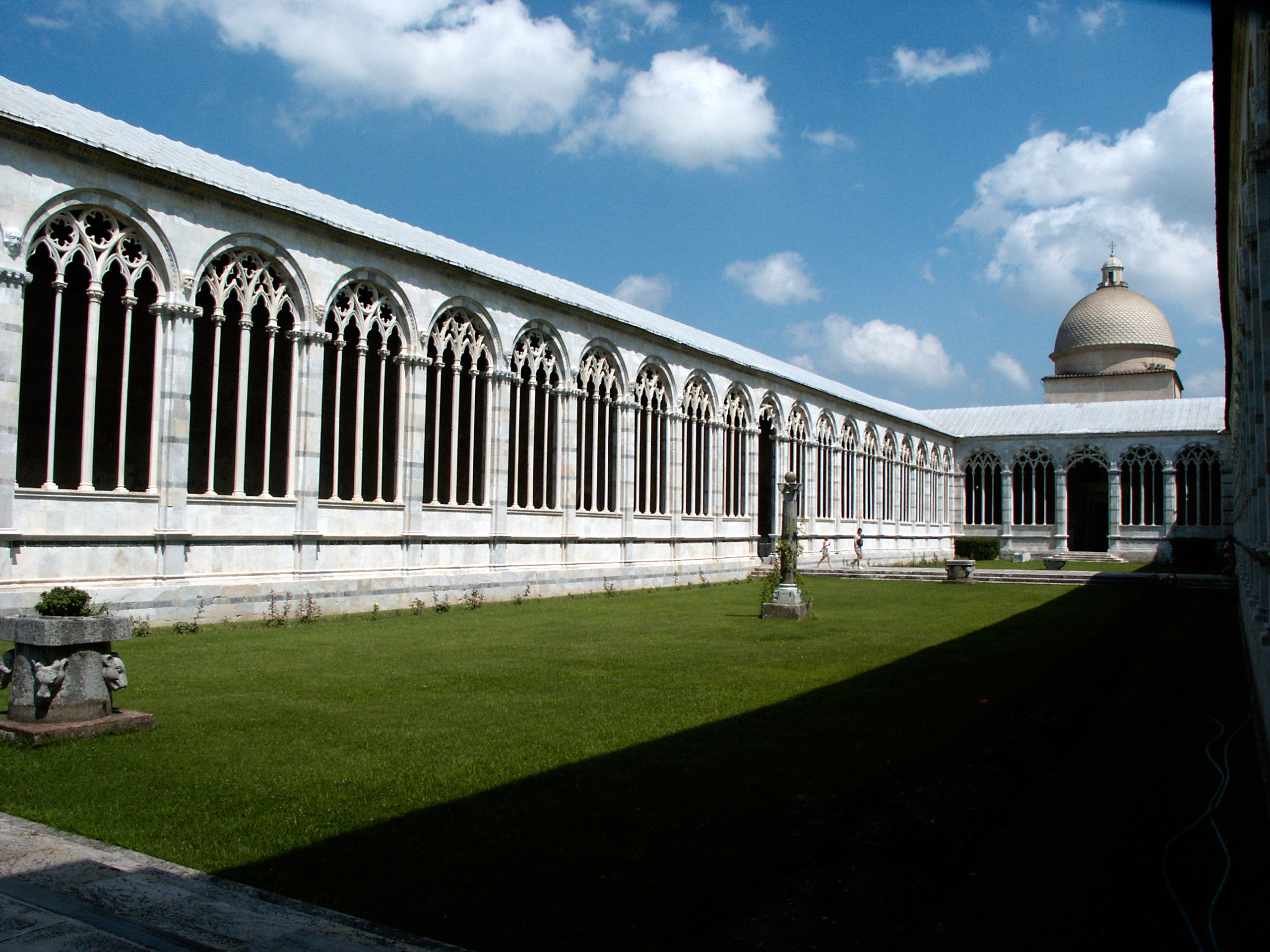
The Monumental Campo Santo in the Piazza del Duomo

While the bell tower of the cathedral, known as "the leaning Tower of Pisa", is the most famous image of the city, it is one of many works of art and architecture in the city's Piazza del Duomo, also known, since the 20th century, as Piazza dei Miracoli (Square of Miracles), to the north of the old town center. The Piazza del Duomo also houses the Duomo (the Cathedral), the Baptistry and the Campo Santo (the monumental cemetery). The medieval complex includes the above-mentioned four sacred buildings, the old hospital (now Museo delle Sinopie) and few palaces. All the complex is kept by the Opera (fabrica ecclesiae) della Primaziale Pisana, an old non profit foundation that has operated since the building of the Cathedral in 1063 to maintain the sacred buildings. The area is framed by medieval walls kept by the municipal administration.

Other sights include:

- Knights' Square (Piazza dei Cavalieri), where the Palazzo della Carovana, with its façade designed by Giorgio Vasari may be seen. Sited on the square.
- Santo Stefano dei Cavalieri, church sited on Piazza dei Cavalieri, and also designed by Vasari. It had originally a single nave; two more were added in the 17th century. It houses a bust by Donatello, and paintings by Vasari, Jacopo Ligozzi, Alessandro Fei, and Pontormo. It also contains spoils from the many naval battles between the Cavalieri (Knights of St. Stephan) and the Turks between the 16th and 18th centuries, including the Turkish battle pennant hoisted from Ali Pacha's flagship at the 1571 Battle of Lepanto.
- St. Sixtus. This small church, consecrated in 1133, is also close to the Piazza dei Cavalieri. It was used as a seat of the most important notarial deeds of the town, also hosting the Council of Elders. It is today one of the best preserved early Romanesque buildings in town.
- St. Francis. The church of San Francesco may have been designed by Giovanni di Simone, built after 1276. In 1343 new chapels were added and the church was elevated. It has a single nave and a notable belfry, as well as a 15th-century cloister. It houses works by Jacopo da Empoli, Taddeo Gaddi and Santi di Tito. In the Gherardesca Chapel are buried Ugolino della Gherardesca and his sons.
- San Frediano. This church, built by 1061, has a basilica interior with three aisles, with a crucifix from the 12th century. Paintings from the 16th century were added during a restoration, including works by Ventura Salimbeni, Domenico Passignano, Aurelio Lomi, and Rutilio Manetti.
- San Nicola. This medieval church built by 1097, was enlarged between 1297 and 1313 by the Augustinians, perhaps by the design of Giovanni Pisano. The octagonal belfry is from the second half of the 13th century. The paintings include the Madonna with Child by Francesco Traini (14th century) and St. Nicholas Saving Pisa from the Plague (15th century). Noteworthy are also the wood sculptures by Giovanni and Nino Pisano, and the Annunciation by Francesco di Valdambrino.
- Santa Maria della Spina. A small white marble church alongside the Arno, is attributed to Lupo di Francesco (1230), is another excellent Gothic building.
- San Paolo a Ripa d'Arno. The church was founded around 952 and enlarged in the mid-12th century along lines similar to those of the cathedral. It is annexed to the Romanesque Chapel of St. Agatha, with an unusual pyramidal cusp or peak.

San Pietro in Vinculis. Known as San Pierino, it is an 11th-century church with a crypt and a cosmatesque mosaic on the floor of the main nave.

- Borgo Stretto. This medieval borgo or neighborhood contains strolling arcades. It includes the Gothic-Romanesque church of San Michele in Borgo (990).
- There are at least two other leaning towers in the city; one at the southern end of central Via Santa Maria (close to the San Nicola church), the other halfway through the Piagge riverside promenade, belltower to San Michele church.
- Medici Palace. The palace was once a possession of the Appiano family, who ruled Pisa in 1392–1398. In 1400 the Medici acquired it, and Lorenzo de' Medici sojourned here.
- Orto botanico di Pisa. The botanical garden of the University of Pisa is Europe's oldest university botanical garden.
- The Lungarno, the avenues along the river Arno, host many relevant buildings:
- Palazzo Reale. The ("Royal Palace"), once belonged to the Caetani patrician family. Here Galileo Galilei showed to Grand Duke of Tuscany the planets he had discovered with his telescope. The edifice was erected in 1559 by Baccio Bandinelli for Cosimo I de Medici, and was later enlarged including other palaces. The palace is now a museum.
- Palazzo Gambacorti: 14th-century Gothic palace, and now houses the offices of the municipality. The interior shows frescoes boasting Pisa's sea victories.
- Palazzo Agostini. 15th-century Gothic palace that incorporates city walls predating 1155. It houses Caffè dell'Ussero, a coffeeshop founded in 1775, and during the 19th-century a meeting spot for patriots and intelligentsia.
- Mural Tuttomondo. A modern mural, the last public work by Keith Haring, on the rear wall of the convent of the Church of Sant'Antonio, painted in June 1989.

=== Museums ===
- Museo dell'Opera del Duomo: exhibiting among others the original sculptures of Nicola Pisano and Giovanni Pisano, the Islamic Pisa Griffin, and the treasures of the cathedral.
- Museo delle Sinopie: showing the sinopias from the Campo Santo, the monumental cemetery. These are the underdrawings for frescoes, made with reddish, greenish or brownish earth colour with water.
- Museo Nazionale di San Matteo: exhibiting sculptures and paintings from the 12th to 15th centuries, among them the masterworks of Giovanni and Andrea Pisano, the Master of San Martino, Simone Martini, Nino Pisano and Masaccio.
- Museo Nazionale di Palazzo Reale: exhibiting the belongings of the families that lived in the palace: paintings, statues, armors, etc.
- Museo Nazionale degli Strumenti per il Calcolo: exhibiting a collection of instruments used in science, between a pneumatic machine of Van Musschenbroek and a compass which probably belonged to Galileo Galilei.
- Museo di storia naturale dell'Università di Pisa (Natural History Museum of the University of Pisa), located in the Certosa di Calci, outside the city. It houses one of the largest cetacean skeletons collection in Europe.
- Palazzo Blu: temporary exhibitions and cultural activities center, located in the Lungarno, in the heart of the old town, the palace is easy recognizable because it is the only blue building.
- Cantiere delle Navi di Pisa - The Pisa's Ancient Ships Archaeological Area: A museum of 10,650 square meters – 3,500 archaeological excavation, 1,700 laboratories and one restoration center – that visitors can visit with a guided tour. The Museum opened in June 2019 and has been located inside to the 16th-century Medicean Arsenals in Lungarno Ranieri Simonelli, restored under the supervision of the Tuscany Soprintendenza. It hosts a remarkable collection of ceramics and amphoras dated back from the 8th century BCE to the 2nd century BC, and also 32 ships dated back from the second century BCE and the seventh century BC. Four of them are integrally preserved and the best one is the so-called Barca C, also named Alkedo (written in the ancient Greek characters). The first boat was accidentally discovered in 1998 near the Pisa San Rossore railway station and the archeological excavations were completed 20 years later.

=== Churches ===
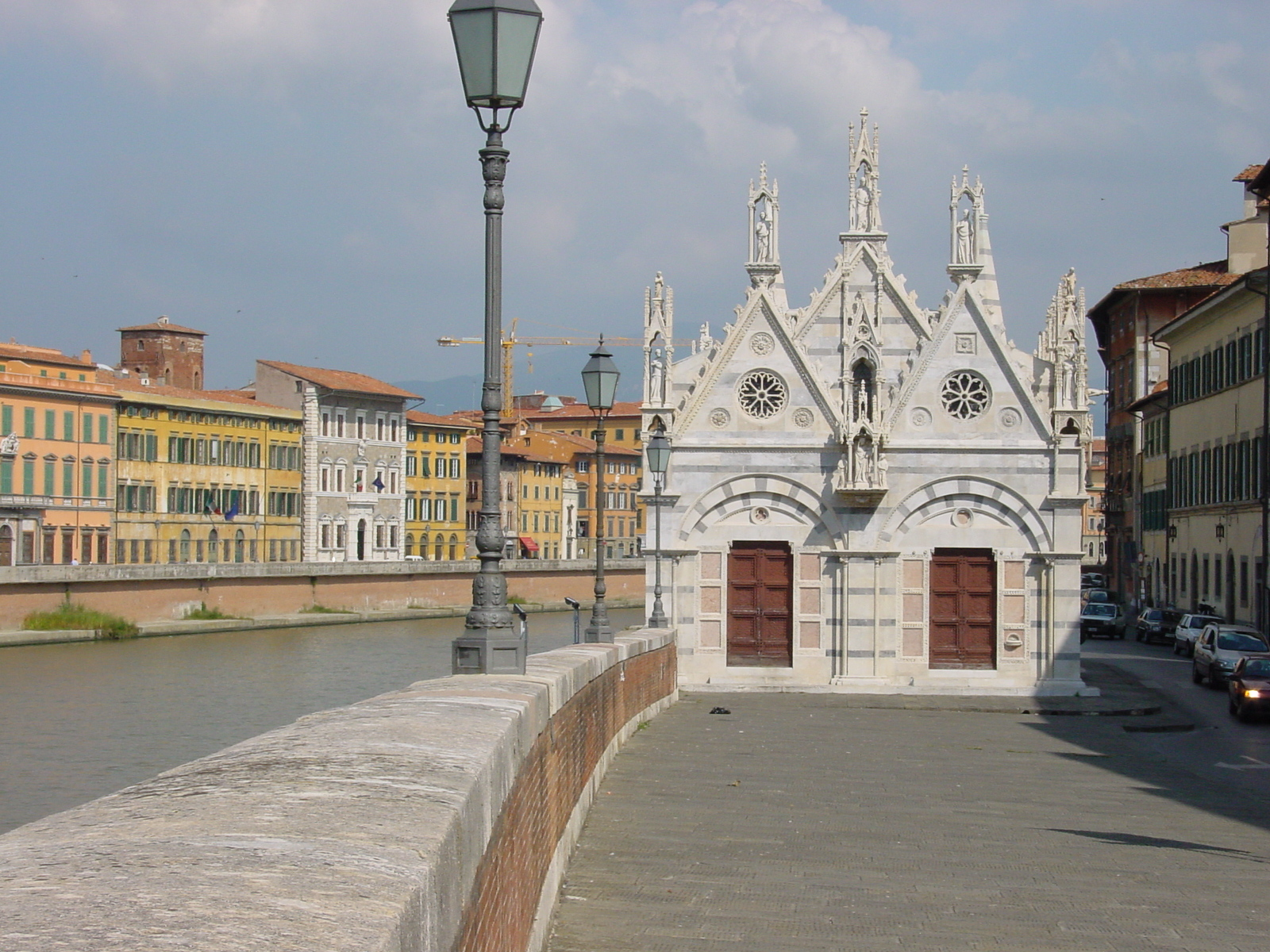
Façade of Santa Maria della Spina

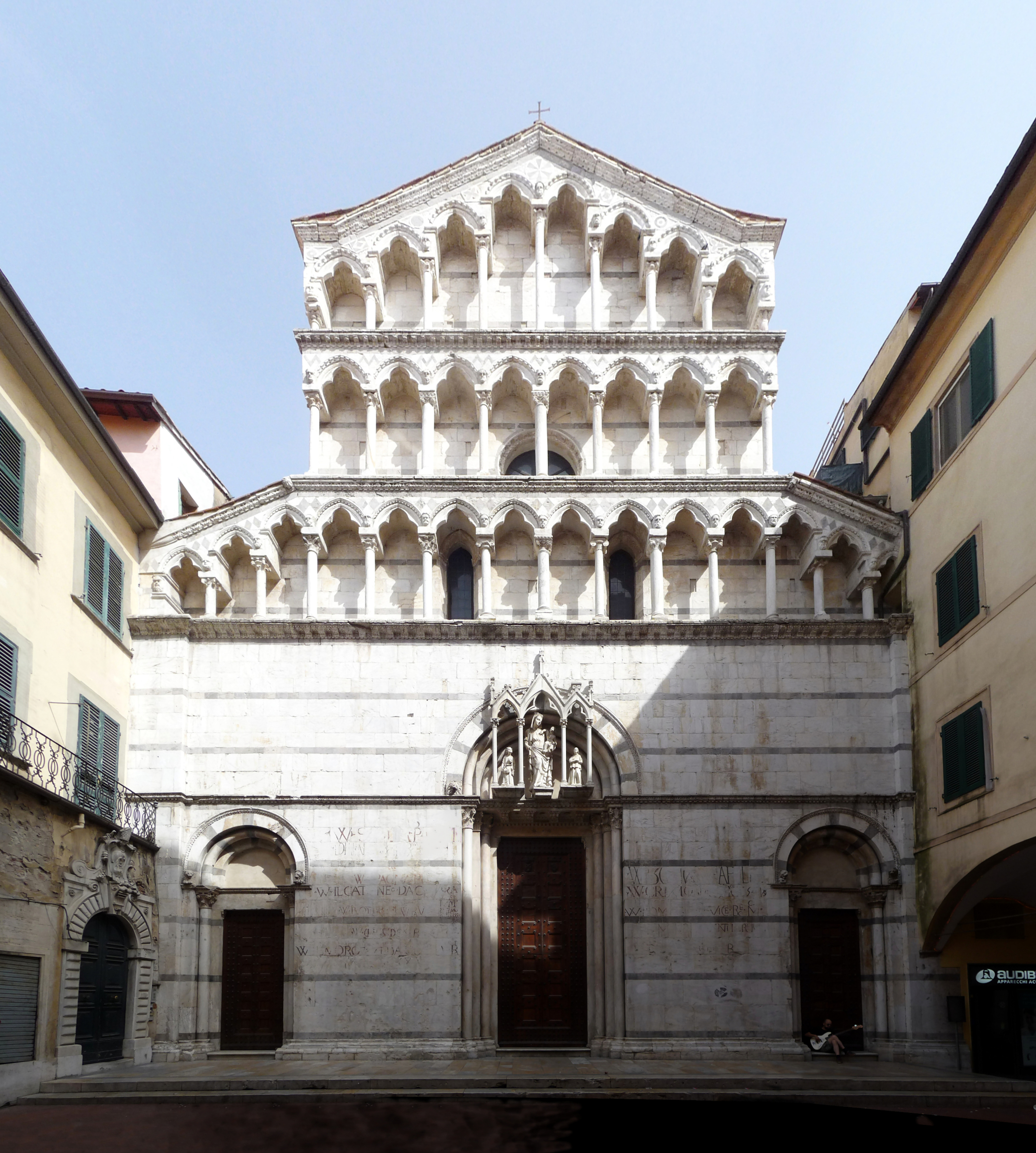
San Michele in Borgo

- Baptistry, with the famous Pulpit in the Pisa Baptistery of 1260, by Nicola Pisano
- San Francesco
- San Frediano
- San Giorgio ai Tedeschi
- San Michele in Borgo
- San Nicola
- San Paolo a Ripa d'Arno
- San Paolo all'Orto
- San Piero a Grado
- San Pietro in Vinculis
- San Sisto
- San Tommaso delle Convertite
- San Zeno
- Santa Caterina
- Santa Cristina
- Santa Maria della Spina
- Santo Sepolcro

=== Palaces, towers and villas ===
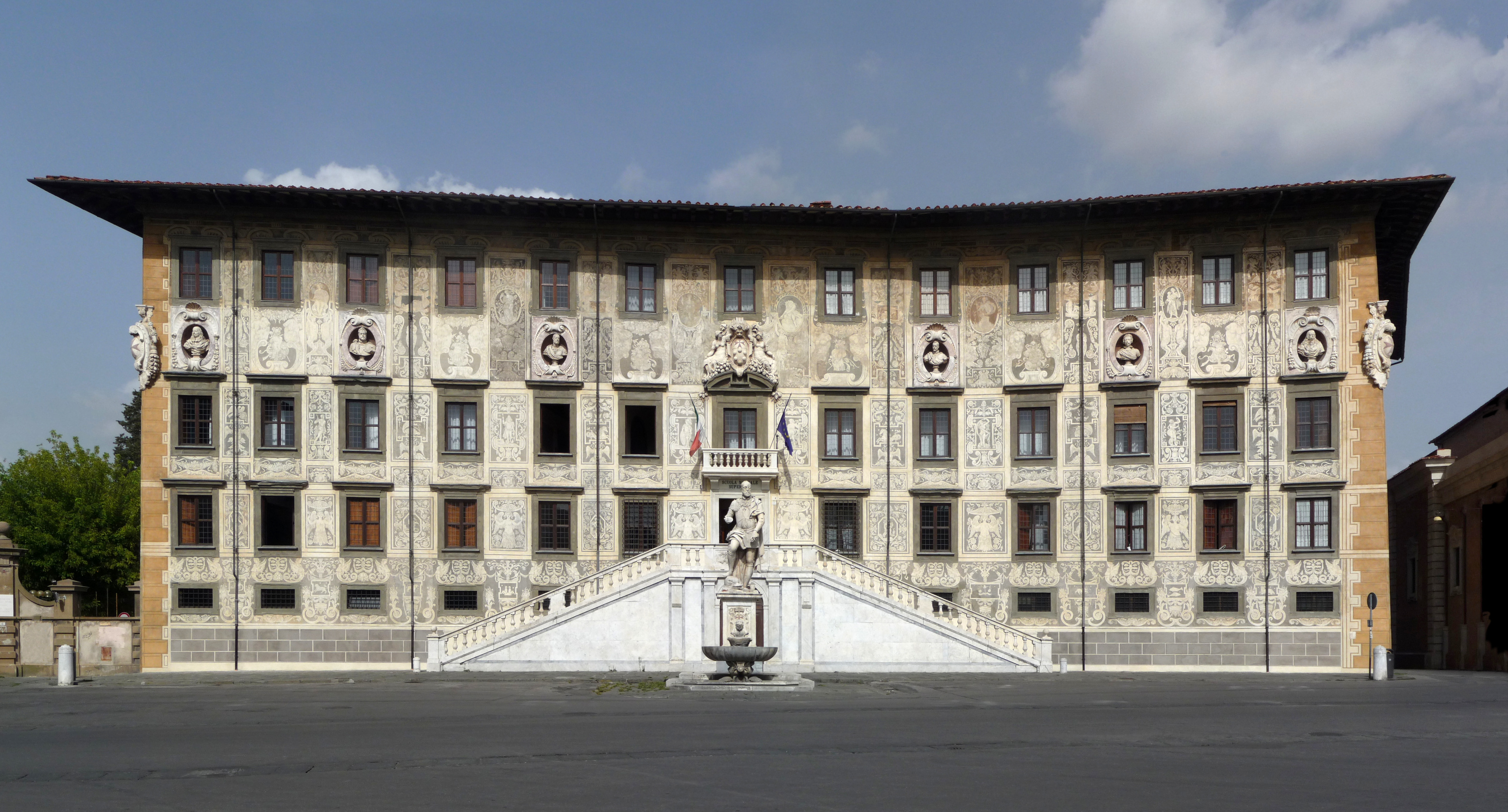
Palazzo della Carovana or dei Cavalieri

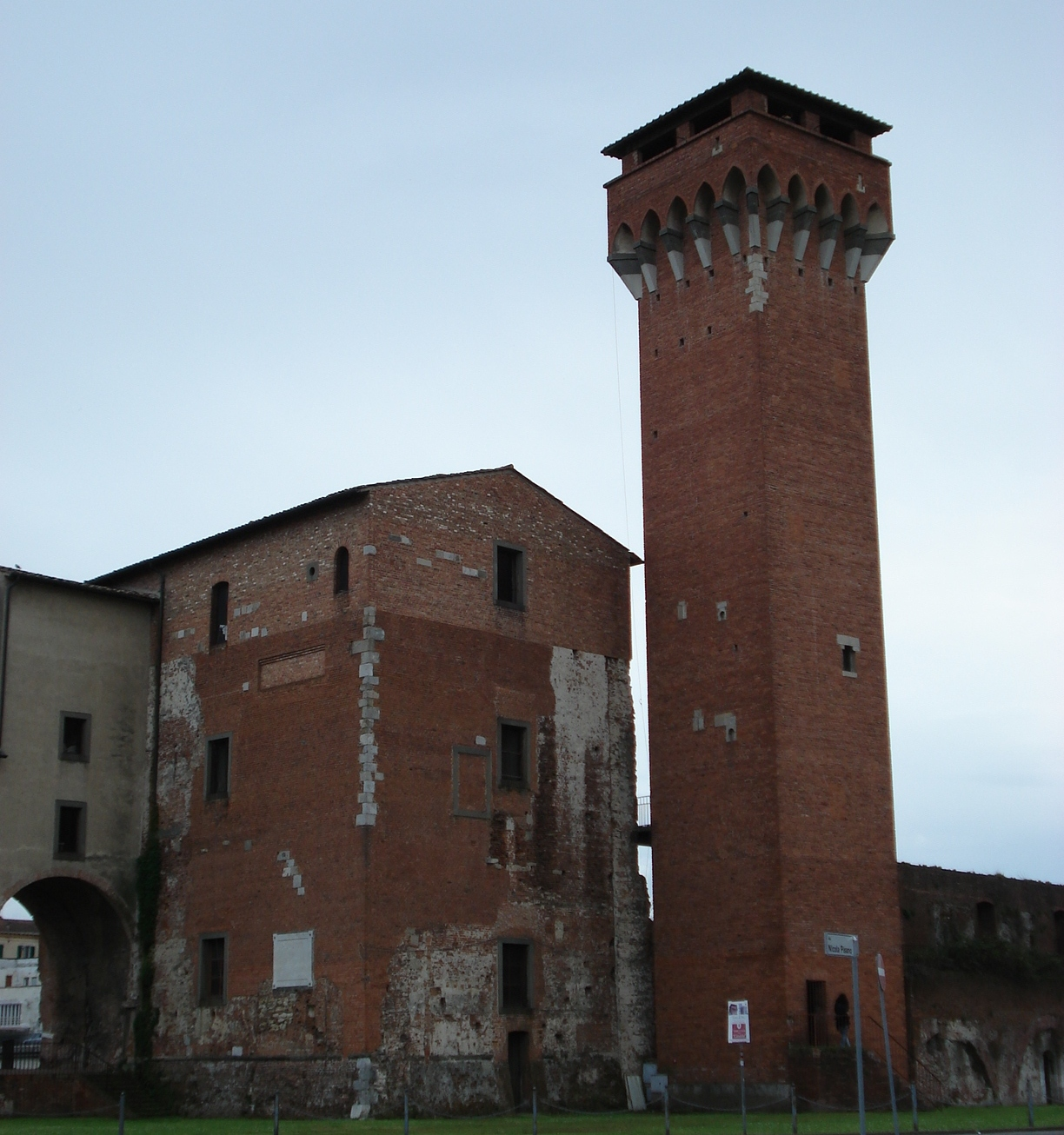
Cittadella vecchia

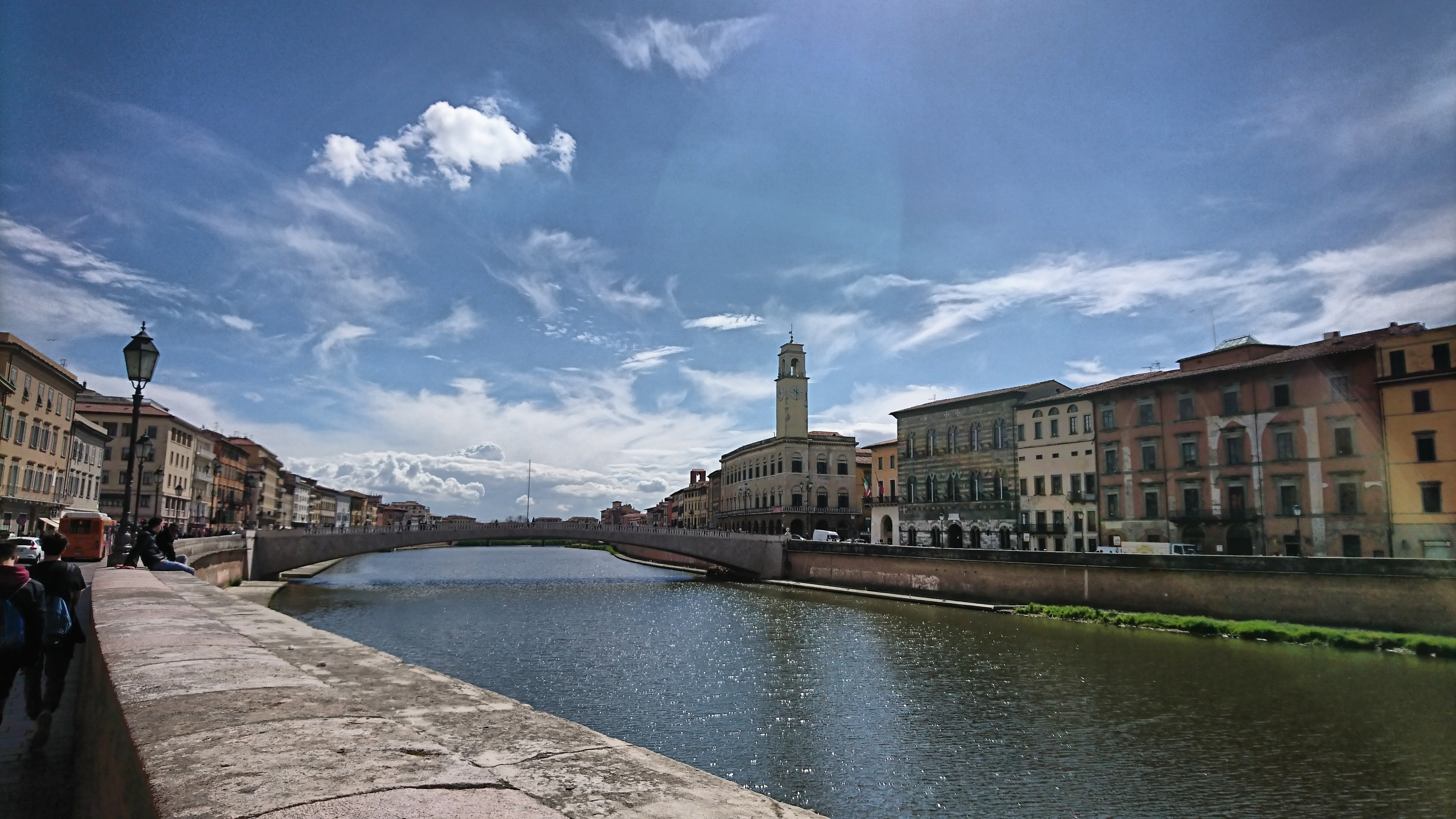
Lungarno di Pisa

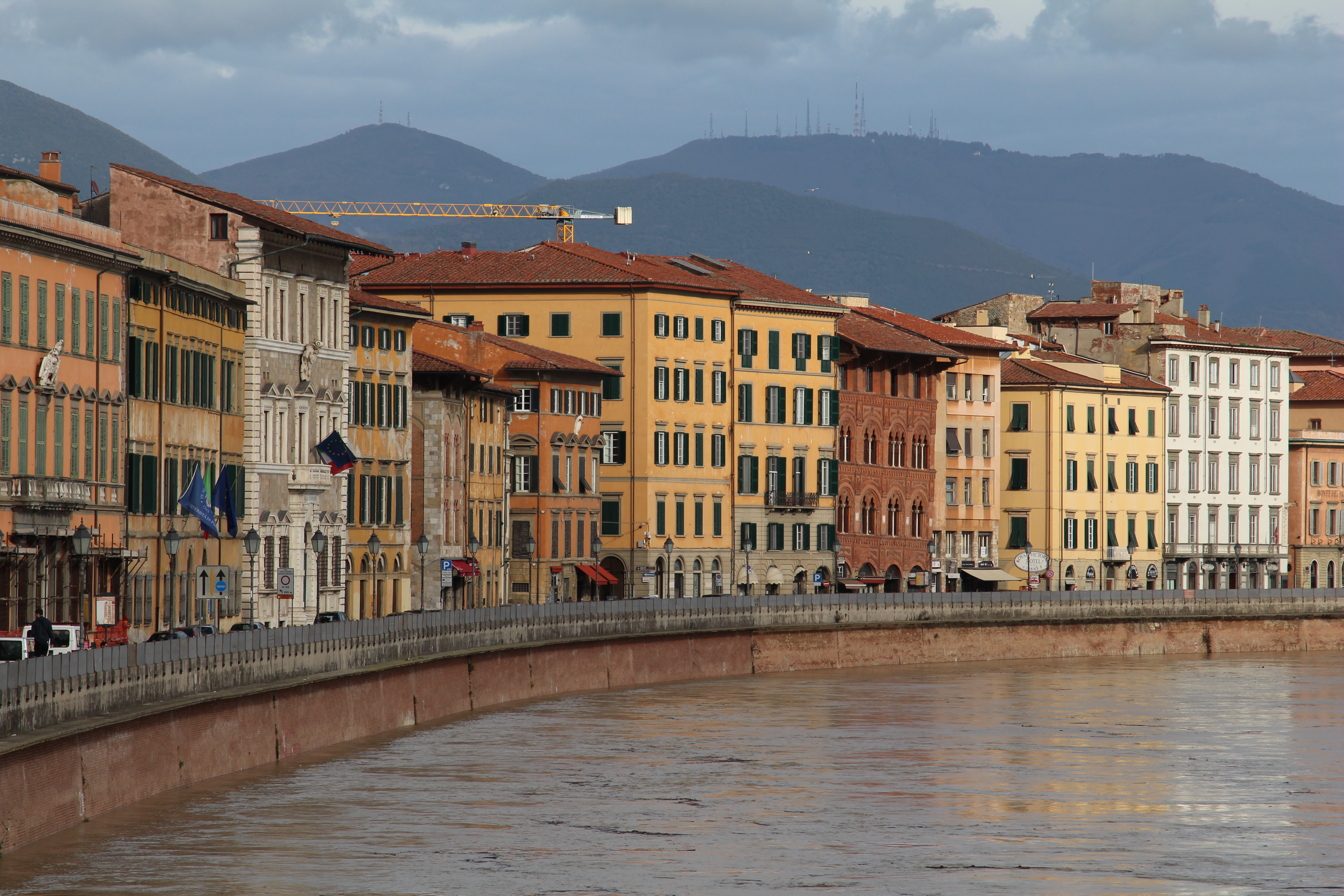
Pisa river view

- Palazzo del Collegio Puteano
- Palazzo della Carovana
- Palazzo delle Vedove
- Torre dei Gualandi
- Villa di Corliano
- Leaning Tower of Pisa

=== Other buildings ===
- Pisa Courthouse
- Synagogue of Pisa

== Sports ==
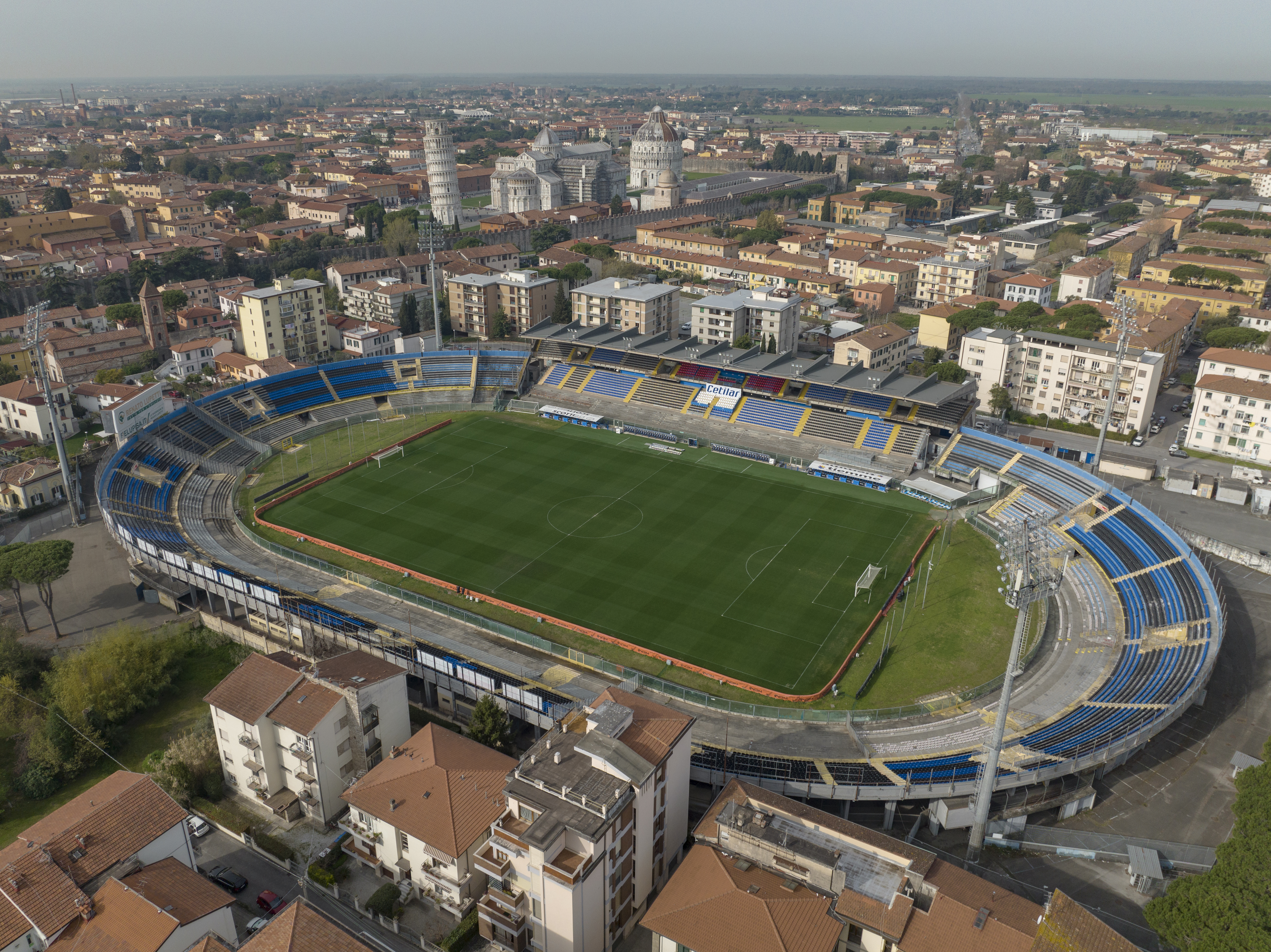
A.C. Pisa 1909 play at the Arena Garibaldi – Stadio Romeo Anconetani

=== Football ===
Football is the main sport in Pisa; the local team, Pisa SC, currently plays in the Serie B (the second highest football division in Italy), and has had a top flight history throughout the 1980s and the 1990s, featuring several world-class players such as Diego Simeone, Christian Vieri and Dunga during this time. The club play at the Arena Garibaldi, which opened in 1919 and has a capacity of 25,000.

=== Shooting ===
Shooting was one of the first sports to have their own association in Pisa. The Società del Tiro a Segno di Pisa was founded on July 9, 1862. In 1885, they acquired their own training field. The shooting range was almost completely destroyed during World War II.

== Transport ==
=== Airport ===
Pisa has an international airport known as Pisa International Airport or normally Galileo Galilei located in San Giusto neighbourhood in Pisa. It is served by several airlines which connect it to various domestic and international destinations. Many low-cost airlines operate there.

=== Pisamover ===
The airport is connected to Pisa Centrale railway station by a people mover system 2 km (1.2 mi) long, called Pisamover inaugurated in March 2017. It is based on a driverless "horizontal funicular" that travels the distance in 5 minutes, with a 5-minute frequency, having an intermediate stop at parking station San Giusto/Aurelia.

=== Buses ===
Consorzio Pisano Trasporti, also known as CPT, was a Società consortile a responsabilità limitata (Scarl) that operated since 2005 the local public transport in Pisa and in the province. Became subsidiary of Compagnia Toscana Trasporti Nord in 2012 and was one the companies of the consortium ONE Scarl to accomplish the contract stipulated with the Regione Toscana for the public transport in the 2018-2019 period. The fleet consisted of 70 urban, 15 suburban and 260 intercity buses.

Since 1 November 2021 the public local transport is managed by Autolinee Toscane.

Urban routes

- LAM Rossa: Cisanello Hospital - Central Station – Duomo – Parking Pietrasantina
- LAM Verde: San Giusto - Central Station - Pratale
- Shuttle E: Lungarno Pacinotti – Park Brennero – La Fontina
- Night LAM: Cisanello–Lungarni (night service)
- Night LAM: Pietrasantina–Lungarni (night service)
- Shuttle Torre: Park Pietrasantina – Largo Cocco Griffi (Duomo)
- Shuttle Cisanello Hospital: Park Bocchette – Cisanello (Hospital)
- 2: San Giusto – Central Station – Porta a Lucca
- 4: Central Station – I Passi
- 5: Putignano – Central Station – C.E.P.
- 6: Central Station – C.E.P. – Barbaricina
- 8: Coltano – Vittorio Emanuele II square
- 12: Viale Gramsci – Ospedaletto (Expò) – Bus Depot CPT
- 13: Cisanello Hospital – Piagge – Central Station – Pisanova
- 14: Cisanello Hospital – Pisanova – Central Station – Piagge
- 16: Viale Gramsci – Ospedaletto – Industrial Zone (some to Località Montacchiello)
- 21: Airport – Central Station – C.E.P.–Duomo – I Passi (night service)
- 22: Central Station – Piagge–Pisanova–Cisanello–Pratale (night service)

Suburban routes to/from Pisa

- 10: Pisa–Tirrenia–Livorno (deviation to La Vettola - San Piero a Grado)
- 50: Pisa–Collesalvetti–Fauglia–Crespina
- 51: Collesalvetti–Lorenzana–Orciano
- 70: Pisa–Gello–Pontasserchio
- 71: Pisa – Sant'Andrea in Palazzi – Pontasserchio – San Martino Ulmiano: Pisa
- 80: Pisa–Migliarino–Vecchiano–Filettole
- 81: Pisa–Pontasserchio–Vecchiano
- 110: Pisa–Asciano–Agnano
- 120: Pisa–Calci–Montemagno
- 140: Pisa–Vicopisano–Pontedera
- 150: Pisa–Musigliano–Pettori
- 160: Pisa–Navacchio–Calci – Tre Colli
- 190: Pisa–Cascina–Pontedera
- 875: Pisa – Arena Metato

=== Trains ===
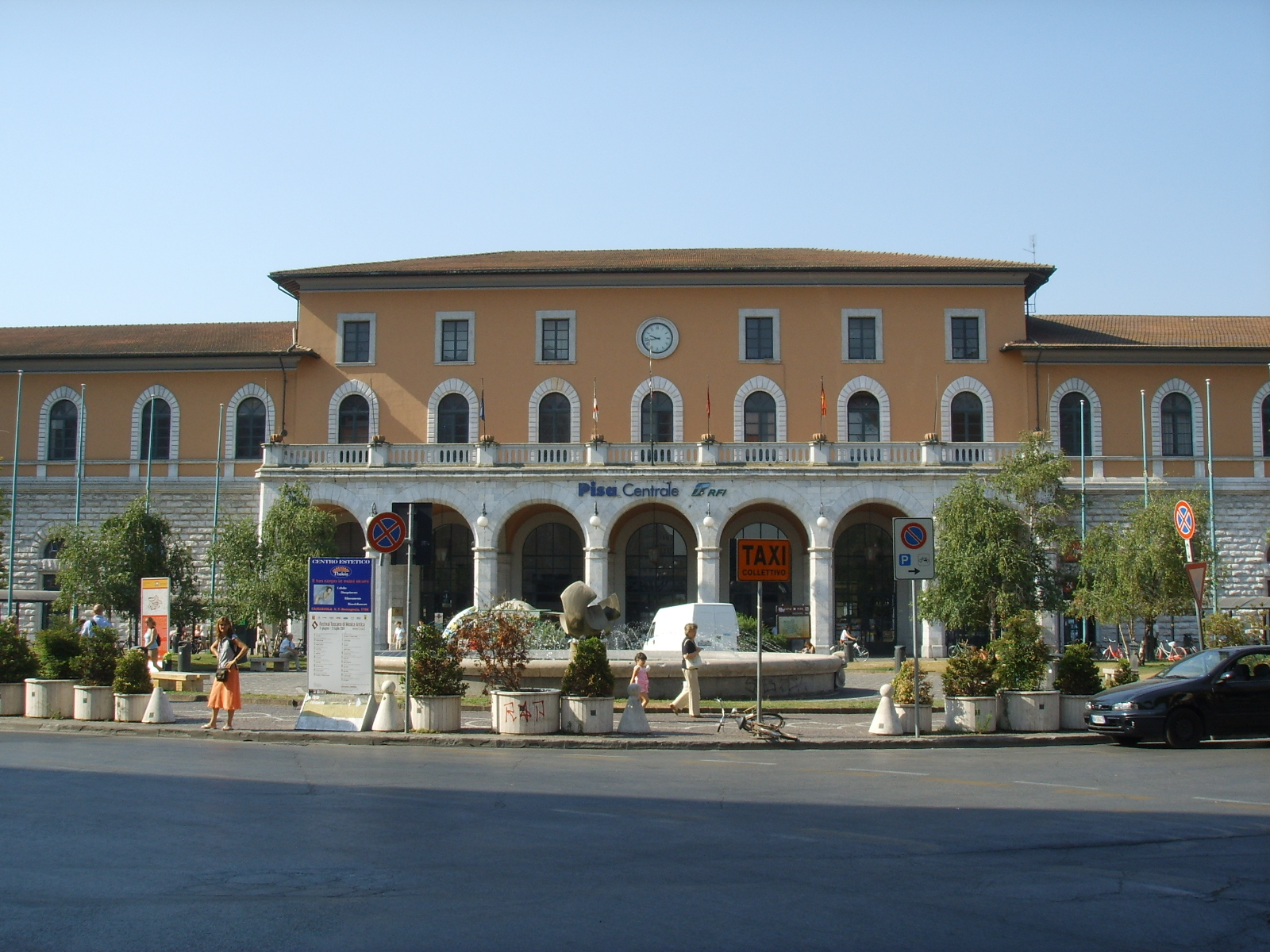
Pisa Centrale railway station

The city is served by two railway stations available for passengers: Pisa Centrale and Pisa San Rossore.

Pisa Centrale is the main railway station and is located along the Tyrrhenic railway line. It connects Pisa directly with several other important Italian cities such as Rome, Florence, Genoa, Turin, Naples, Livorno, and Grosseto.

Pisa San Rossore links the city with Lucca (20 minutes north-east of Pisa) and Viareggio and is also reachable from Pisa Centrale. It is a minor railway station located near the Leaning Tower zone.

There was another station called Pisa Aeroporto situated next to the Airport with services to Pisa Centrale and Florence. It was closed on December 15, 2013, for the realization of a people mover.

=== Motorway ===
Pisa is connected to Autostrada A11 from Florence and to Autostrada A12 linking Genoa-Rosignano with exit Pisa Nord and Pisa Centro – Airport.

== Education ==
Pisa hosts the University of Pisa, especially renowned in the fields of Physics, Mathematics, Engineering and Computer Science. The Scuola Superiore Sant'Anna and the Scuola Normale Superiore, the Italian academic élite institutions are noted mostly for research and the education of graduate students.

Construction of a new leaning tower of glass and steel 57 meters tall, containing offices and apartments was scheduled to start in summer 2004 and take 4 years. It was designed by Dante Oscar Benini and raised criticism.

- The Scuola Normale Superiore di Pisa was founded in 1810, by Napoleonic decree, as a branch of the École Normale Supérieure of Paris. Recognized as a "national university" in 1862, one year after Italian unification, and named during that period as "Normal School of the Kingdom of Italy" (Superior Graduate Schools in Italy i.e. Scuola Superiore Universitaria).

Located at: Scuola Normale Superiore di Pisa – Piazza dei Cavalieri, 7 – 56126 Pisa (Italia)

- The Sant'Anna School of Advanced Studies of Pisa or Scuola Superiore Sant'Anna is a special-statute public university located in Pisa, Italy, emerging from Scuola Normale Superiore di Pisa and operating in the field of applied sciences, (Superior Graduate Schools in Italy i.e. Scuola Superiore Universitaria).

Located at: Scuola Superiore Sant'Anna, P.zza Martiri della Libertà, 33 – 56127 – Pisa (Italia)

- The University of Pisa or Università di Pisa, is one of the oldest universities in Italy. It was formally founded on September 3, 1343, by an edict of Pope Clement VI, although there had been lectures on law in Pisa since the 11th century. The university has Europe's oldest academic botanical garden i.e. Orto botanico di Pisa, founded 1544. The medical school of the university is sight at Azienda ospedaliero-universitaria pisana.

Located at: Università di Pisa – Lungarno Pacinotti, 43 – 56126 Pisa (Italia)

== Notable people ==
For people born in Pisa, see People from the Province of Pisa; among notable non-natives long resident in the city:

- Giuliano Amato (born 1938), politician, former Premier and Minister of Interior Affairs
- Alessandro d'Ancona (1835–1914), critic and writer.
- Silvano Arieti (1914–1981), psychiatrist
- Gaetano Bardini (1926–2017), tenor
- Andrea Bocelli (born 1958), tenor and multi-instrumentalist.
- Maurezo Canevarius, 8th century scribe
- Giosuè Carducci (1835–1907), poet and 1906 Nobel Prize in Literature winner.
- Massimo Carmassi (born 1943), architect
- Carlo Azeglio Ciampi (1920–2016), politician, former President of the Republic of Italy
- Maria Luisa Cicci (1760–1794), poet
- Giovanni Carlo Maria Clari (1677–1754), a musical composer and maestro di cappella at Pistoia.
- Alessio Corti (born 1965), mathematician
- Rustichello da Pisa (born 13th century), writer
- Giovanni Battista Donati (1826–1873), an Italian astronomer.
- Leonardo Fibonacci (1170–1250), mathematician.
- Galileo Galilei (1564–1642), physicist.
- Giovanni Gentile (1875–1944), philosopher and politician
- Orazio Gentileschi (1563–1639), painter.
- Count Ugolino della Gherardesca (1214–1289), noble (see also Dante Alighieri).
- Giovanni Gronchi (1887–1978), politician, former President of the Republic of Italy
- Giacomo Leopardi (1798–1837), poet and philosopher.
- Enrico Letta (born 1966), politician, former Prime Minister of Italy
- Marco Malvaldi (born 1974), mystery novelist
- Leonardo Ortolani (born 1967), comic writer
- Antonio Pacinotti (1841–1912), physicist, inventor of the dynamo
- Andrea Pisano (1290–1348), a sculptor and architect.
- Afro Poli (1902–1988), an operatic baritone
- Bruno Pontecorvo (1913–1993), nuclear physicist
- Gillo Pontecorvo (1919–2006), filmmaker
- Ippolito Rosellini (1800–1843), an Egyptologist.
- Paolo Savi (1798–1871), geologist and ornithologist.
- Antonio Tabucchi (1943–2012), writer and academic

=== Sport ===
- Jason Acuña (born 1973), Stunt performer
- Sergio Bertoni (1915–1995), footballer
- Giorgio Chiellini (born 1984), footballer
- Camila Giorgi (born 1991), tennis player
- Nicola Lacorte (born 2007), racing driver.

== Sister cities ==
Pisa is twinned with:

- Acre, Israel (1988)
- Akademgorodok (Novosibirsk), Russia (1991)
- Angers, France (1982)
- Hangzhou, China (2008)
- Iglesias, Italy (2009)
- Jericho, Palestine (2000)
- Kolding, Denmark (2007)
- Niles, United States (1991)
- Ocala, United States (2004)
- Rhodes, Greece (2009)
- Santiago de Compostela, Spain (2009)
- Unna, Germany (1996)
