= Maurezo Canevarius =

Civil Dignitary of the Longobard Court.
- Monarch: Liutprand, King of the Lombards

Personal details
- Born: Maurilius canavarius 7th century
- Died: 8th century Italian Peninsula
- Occupation: Politician
- Profession: Scribe

Maurezo Canevarius, born in the 7th century, was a medieval judicial official of Lombard or Roman origin. He performed administrative tasks in northern Italy, during the reign of Liutprand.

He had great activity in the areas of Pisa and Tuscia. Towards the year of 730, he made the contracts of purchase and sale of land in the area of Arena, between the citizens Pincolo and Macciolo. A Codice (Mozarabic orational document) from Tarragona, who was signed in Pisa by Maurezo Canevarius, is preserved in the Biblioteca capitolare di Verona.
