= San Tommaso delle Convertite, Pisa =

Church building in Pisa, Italy

Coordinates: 43°43′19.08″N 10°24′0.76″E

Church of San Tommaso delle Convertite
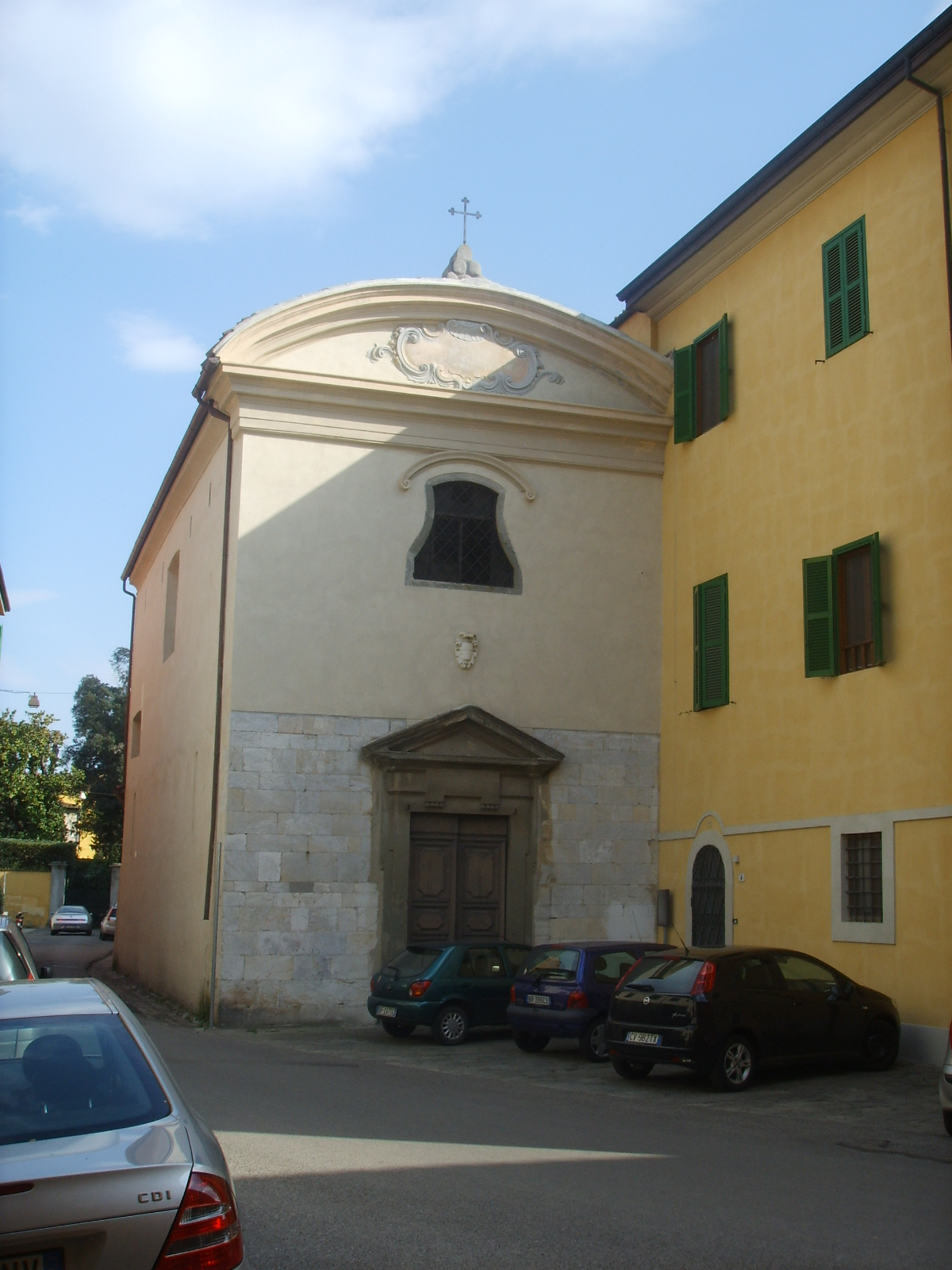

Religion
- Affiliation: Roman Catholic
- Province: Pisa

Location
- Location: Pisa, Italy
- Interactive map of Church of San Tommaso delle Convertite

Architecture
- Type: Church
- Style: Gothic, Baroque
- Groundbreaking: 1160
- Completed: 1758

San Tommaso delle Convertite is a small church in Pisa, Italy.

Documents take note of a church adjacent to an annexed hospital in 1160. In 1610, the grand-duchess of Tuscany Christina of Lorraine, commissioned the convent to house rescued (converted) prostitutes, hence the name.

The church and its façade were rebuilt in 1756-1758 by Camillo Marracci using designs by Ignazio Pellegrini. The church ceiling has the symbols of the patron, Christina of Lorraine.
