= Santa Maria del Carmine, Pisa =

Church building in Pisa, Italy

Coordinates: 43°42′46.04″N 10°24′1.36″E

Church of Santa Maria del Carmine
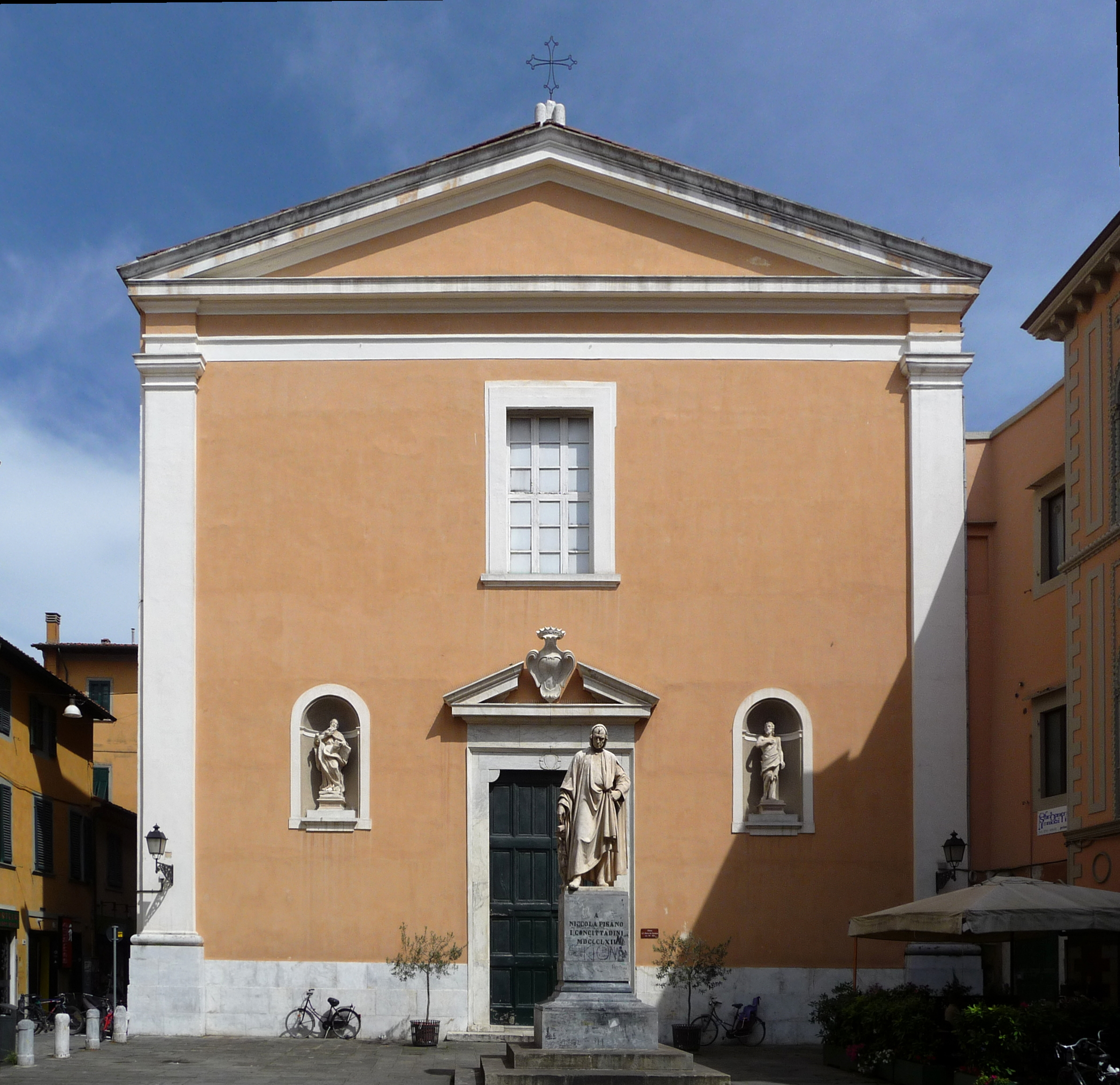
- Facade

Religion
- Affiliation: Roman Catholic
- Province: Pisa

Location
- Location: Pisa, Italy
- Country: Italia
- Interactive map of Church of Santa Maria del Carmine

Architecture
- Type: Church
- Style: Renaissance, Baroque
- Groundbreaking: 1328
- Completed: 1835

Santa Maria del Carmine is a Roman Catholic church in Pisa, Italy known for its altarpiece. It is located in the small Piazza del Carmine, along the Corso Italia.

== History ==
The church was originally built for the Carmelite order in 1325–1328.

Both the church and the adjoining monastery was extensively transformed between the second half of the 16th century and 1612, when it was newly consecrated, and underwent further reconstructions across the centuries. The present simple façade was designed by Alessandro Gherardesca, in the 1830s. The interior has an organ by Andrea Ravani made in 1613, and altars with painting by Baccio Lomi, Aurelio Lomi, Santi di Tito, Alessandro Allori, Francesco Curradi, and Andrea Boscoli.

== The Pisa Altarpiece formerly at Santa Maria del Carmine ==
In February 1426 the Florentine painter Masaccio was commissioned by Giuliano di Colino degli Scarsi da San Giusto, for the sum of 80 florins, to paint a major altarpiece for his chapel dedicated to St. Julian, known today as the Pisa Altarpiece. It is presumed that Masaccio was assisted by Andrea di Giusto, who painted the predella and contributed to the central panel. The work was dismantled and dispersed in the 18th century, and only eleven of about twenty original panels have been rediscovered in various collections around the world. Only one panel of the altarpiece remains in Pisa in the National Museum of San Matteo.

- Madonna and Child Enthroned, now in National Gallery of London.
- Crucifixion, now in Museo di Capodimonte in Naples
- St. Paul, now in Museo Nazionale di San Matteo of Pisa
- St. Andrew, now in Getty Museum of Los Angeles
- Seven panels now in the Gemäldegalerie, Staatliche Museen zu Berlin:
  - St. Augustine,
  - St. Jerome
  - Two Carmelite Saints
  - Martyrdom of St. John the Baptist and Crucifixion of St Peter
  - Stories of St. Julian and St. Nicholas
  - Adoration of the Magi
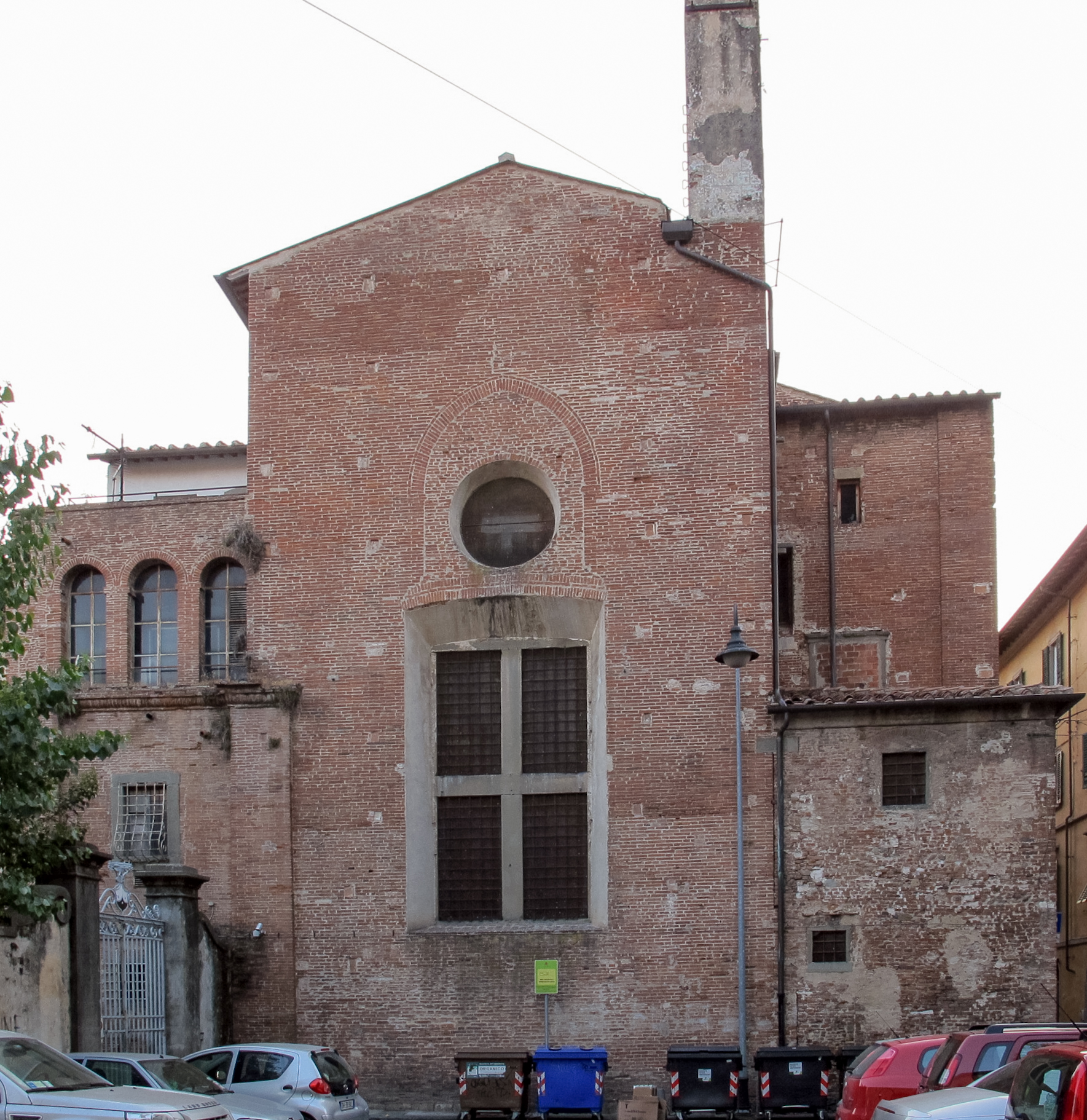
Exterior east side

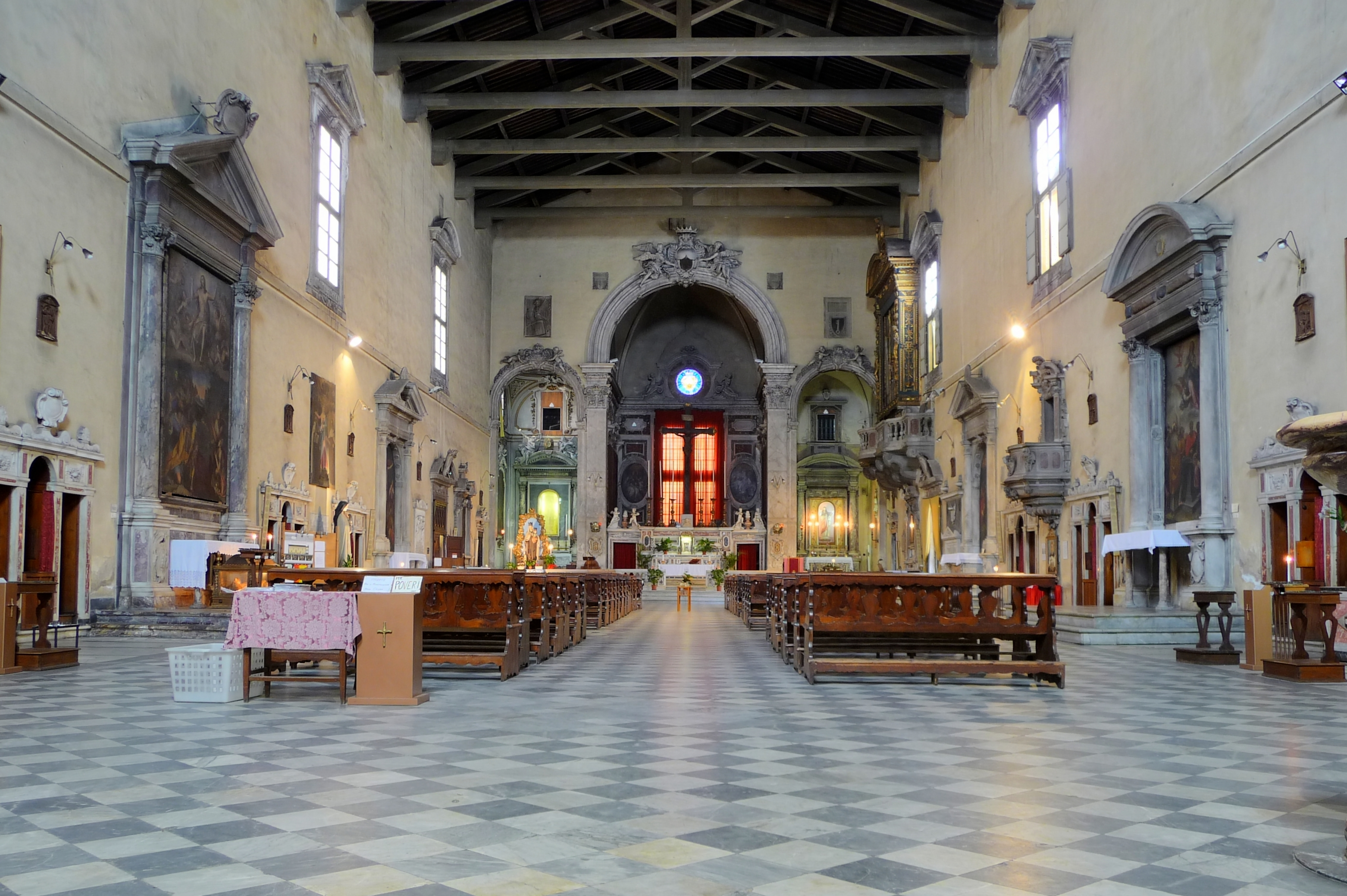
The interior looking east

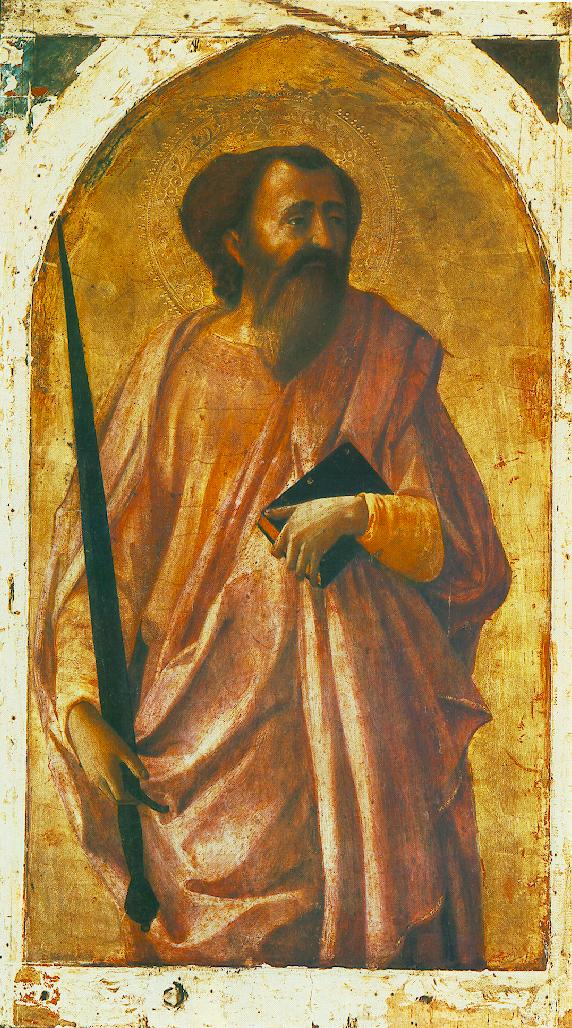
San Paolo, National Museum of San Matteo, Pisa

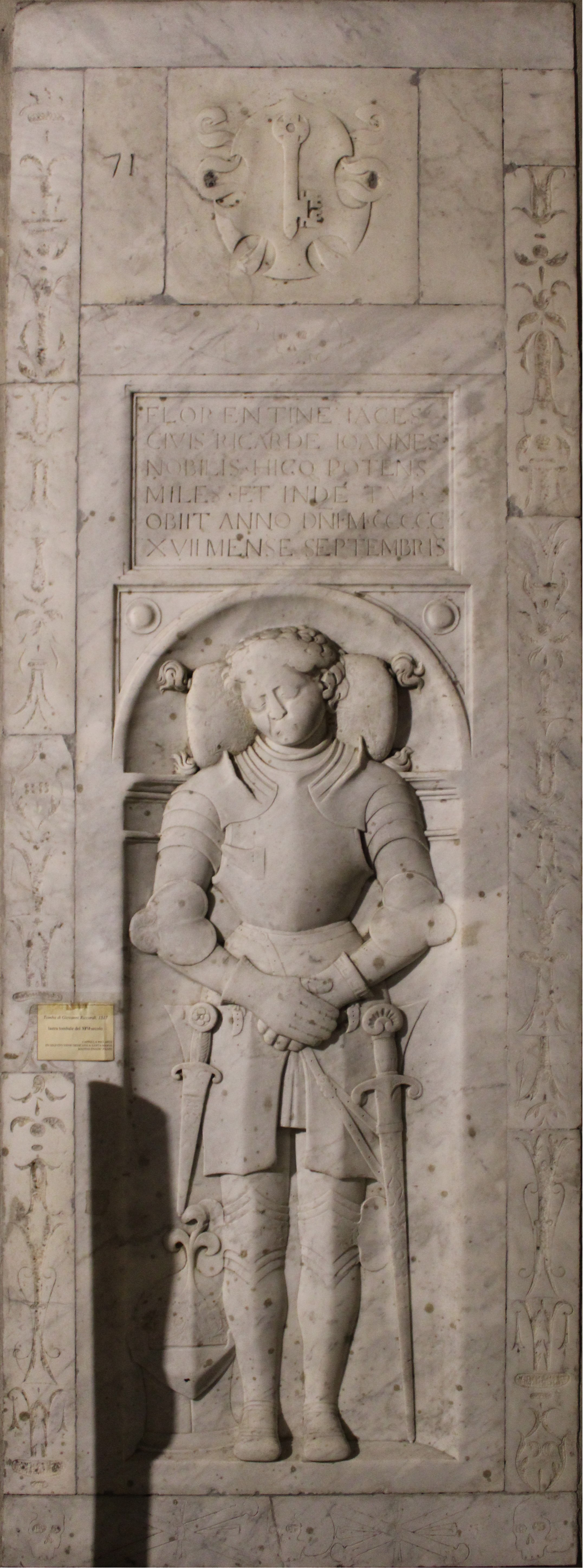
Tomb slab of Giovanni Riccardi (1517) in the former family chapel, now dedicated to the Carmelite mystic Mary Magdalene de' Pazzi

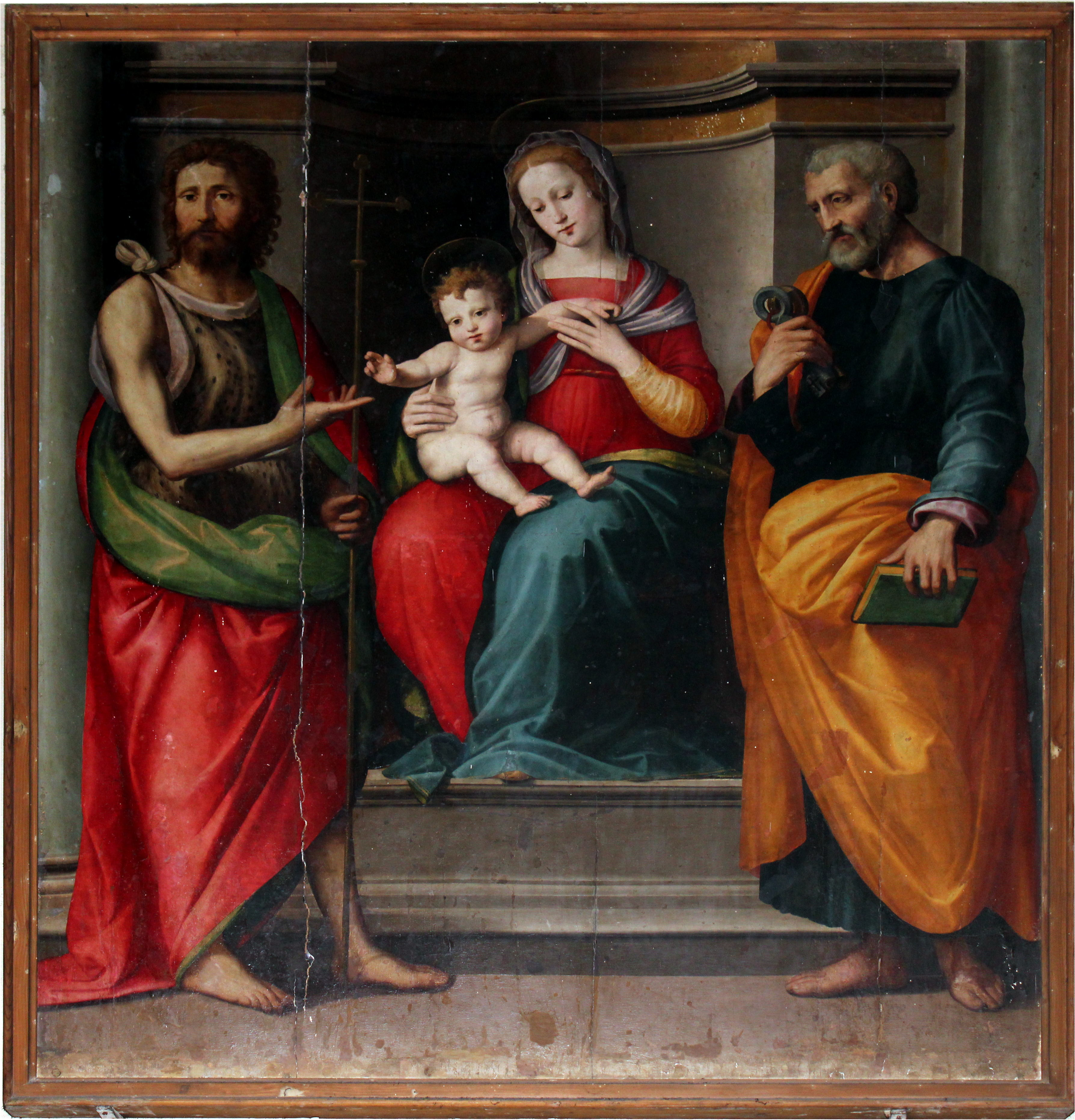
Giovanni Antonio Sogliani (1492–1544), Madonna and Child with John the Baptist and Saint Peter

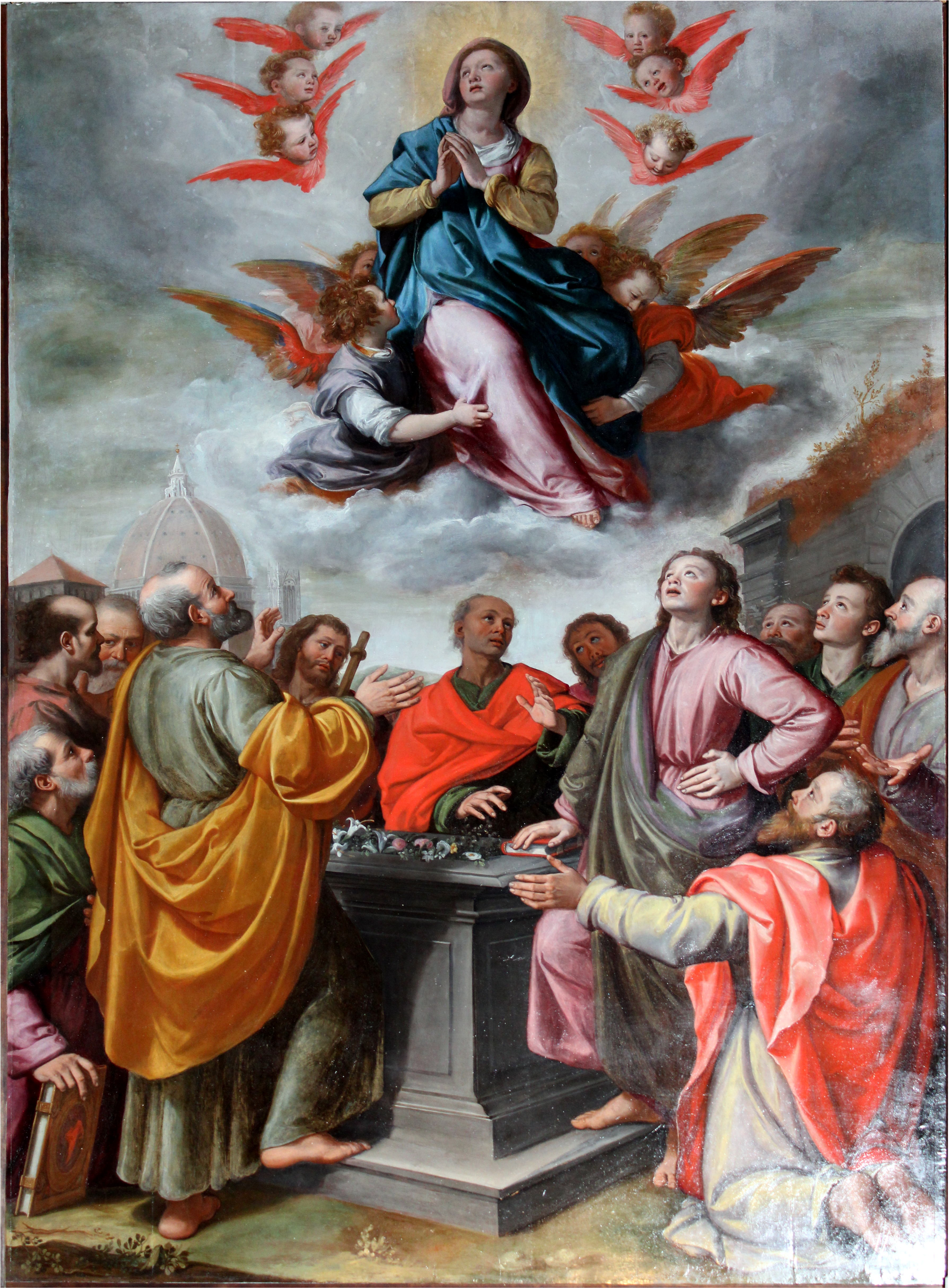
Santi di Tito, Assumption of the Virgin (1579)

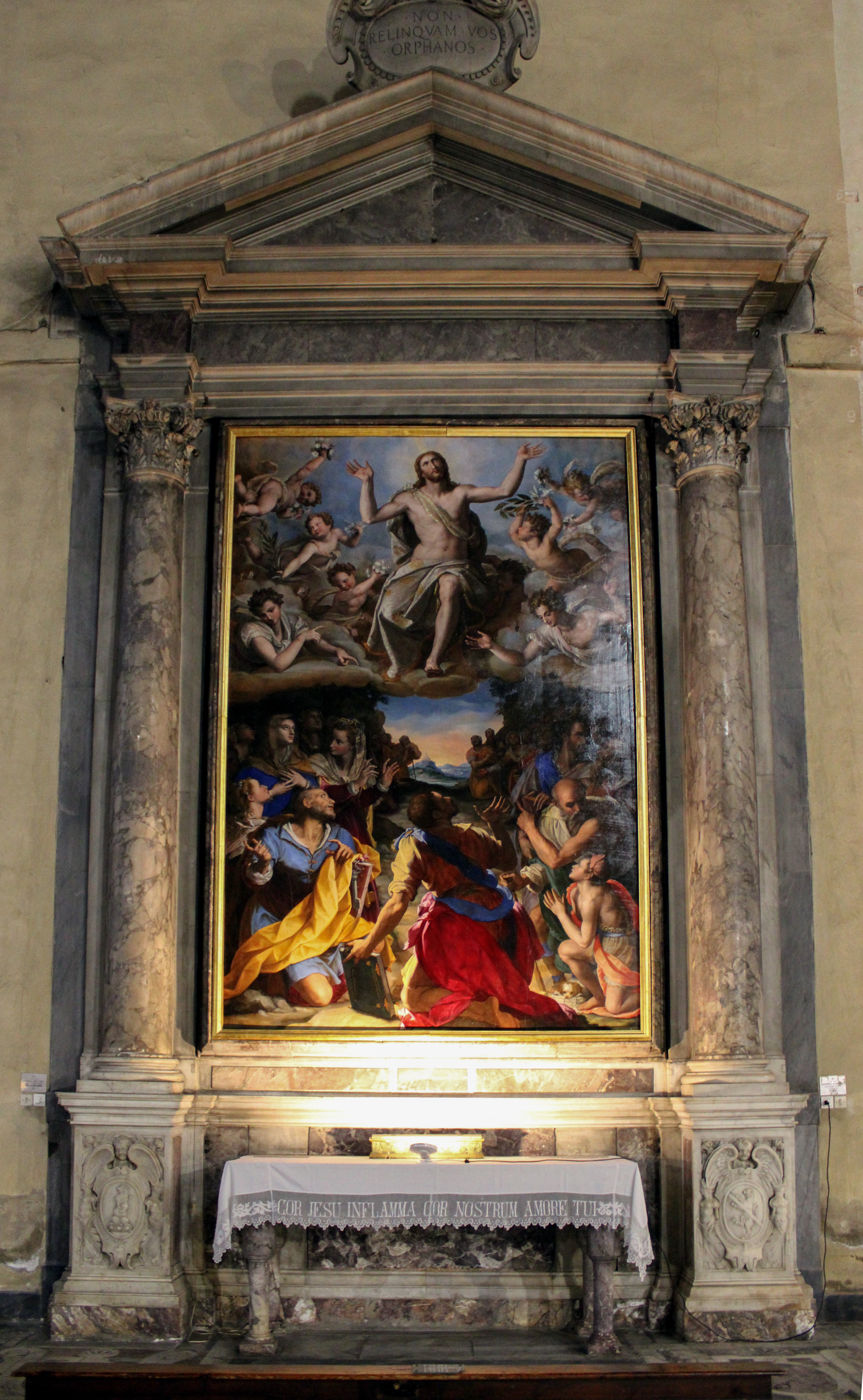
Alessandro Allori, Ascension (1581)

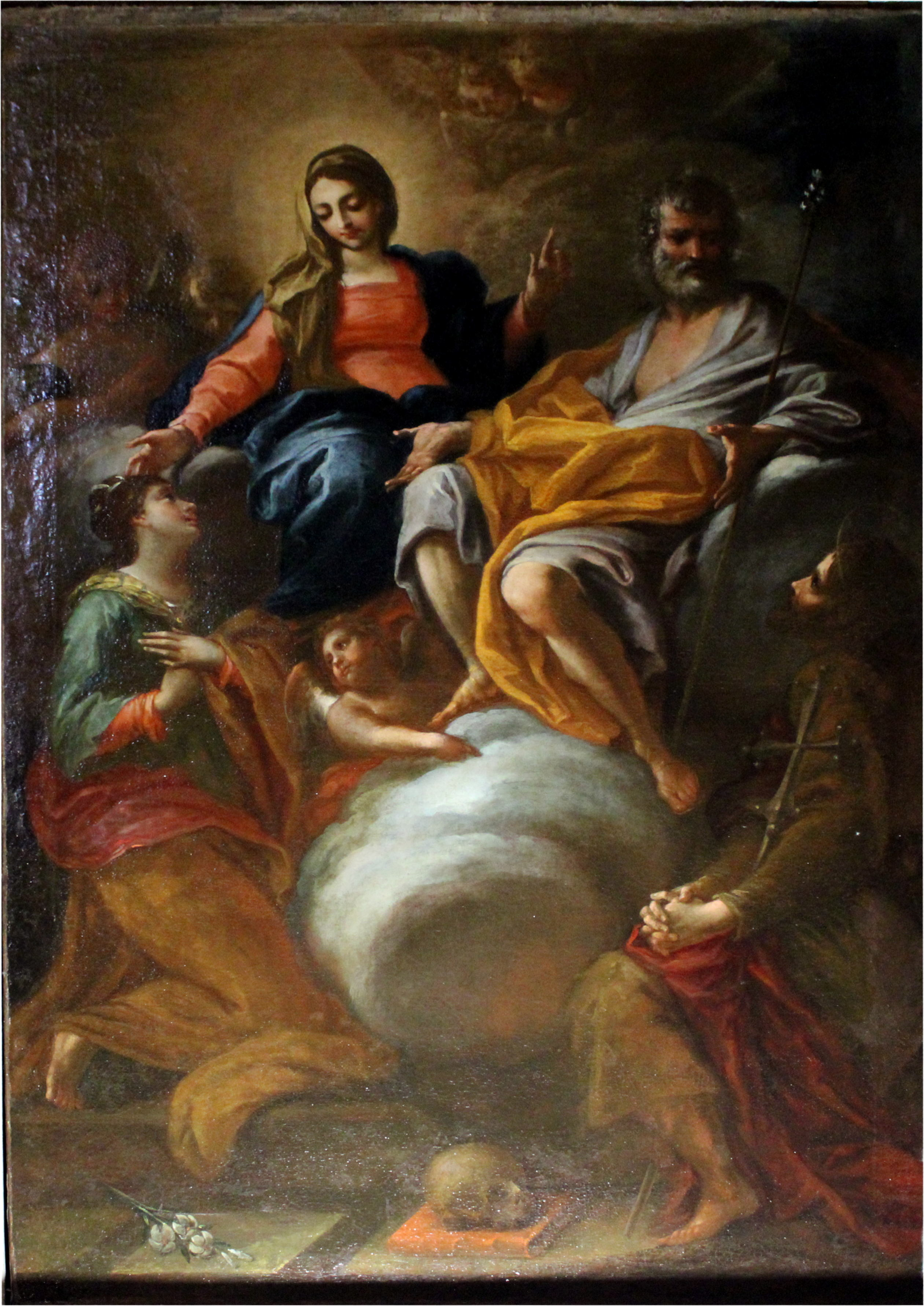
Giovanni Domenico Piastrini (1678–1740), The Virgin in Glory with Saints Joseph, Vittoria and Ranieri, recently restored

== See also ==
- Pisa Altarpiece

== Sources ==
- Barsali, U.; U. Castelli; R. Gagetti; O. Parra (1999). Storia e Capolavori di Pisa. Florence: Bonechi.
- Donati, Roberto. Pisa. Arte e storia. Narni: Plurigraf.
