= Pisan Romanesque style =

Romanesque architectural style variant

Pisan Romanesque
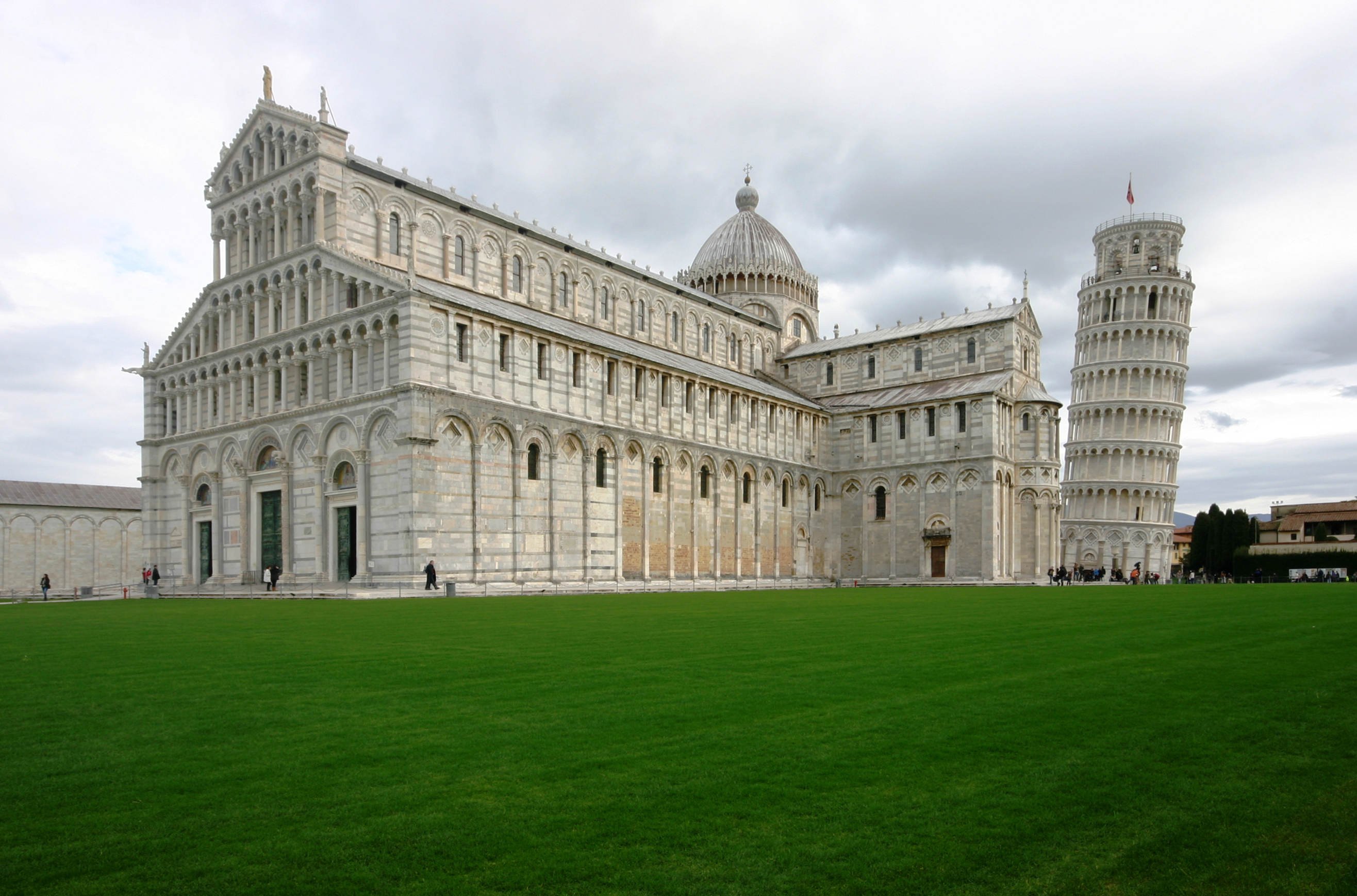
- Piazza dei Miracoli in Pisa
- Years active: 11th to 13th century
- Location: Italy

Pisan Romanesque style is a variant of the Romanesque architectural style that developed in Pisa at the end of the 10th century and which influenced a wide geographical area at the time when the city was a powerful maritime republic (from the second half of the 11th century to the first half of the 13th century).

The Pisan Romanesque culture developed above all at the construction sites of Piazza dei Miracoli (some stylistic elements can also be noticed in the earlier buildings), and from there it spread to other Pisa projects, to the territories controlled by the Republic of Pisa (including Corsica and Sardinia, and going as far as Elba) and to Tuscany, especially the northern band from Lucca to Pistoia.

== Architecture ==
=== History ===
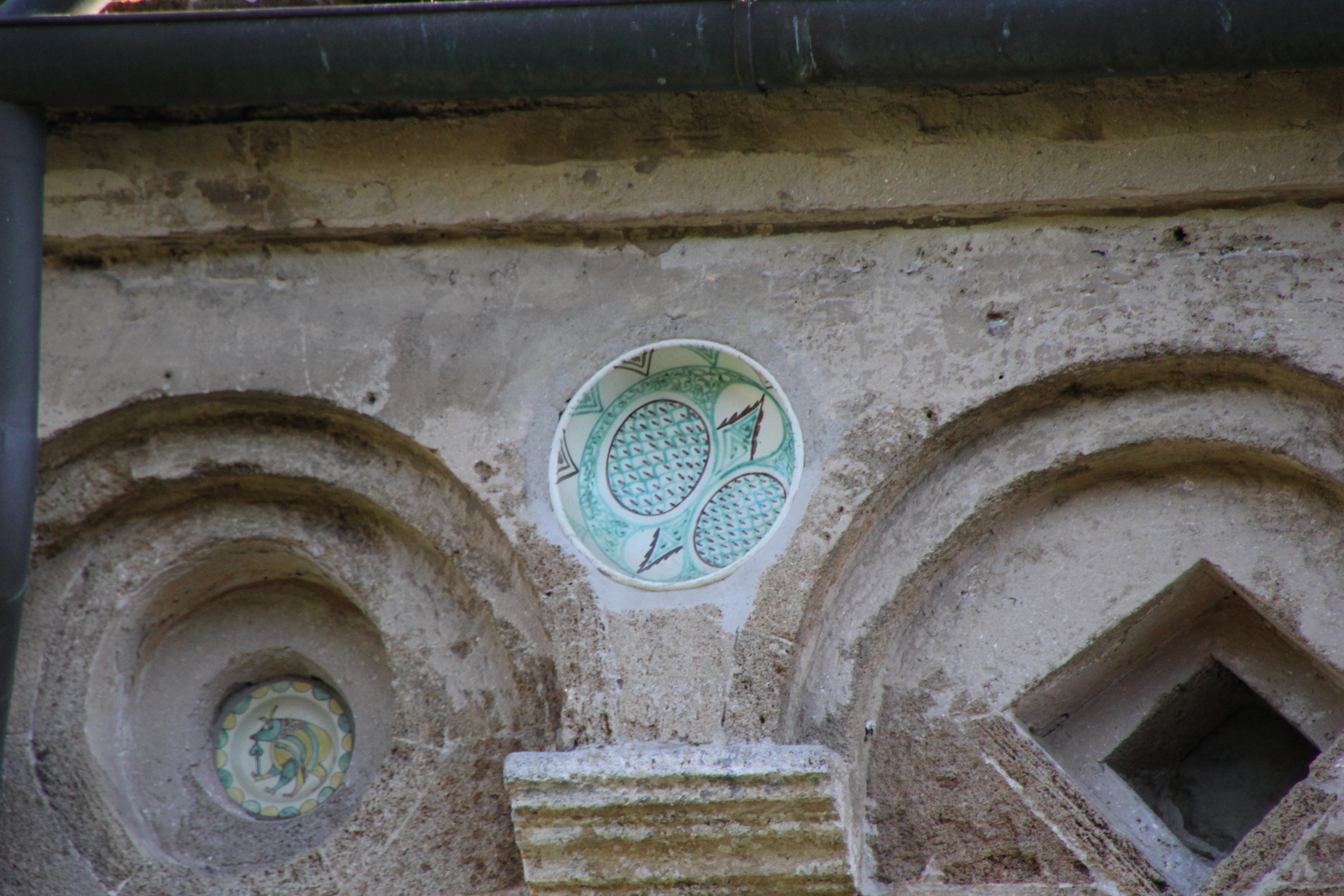
Coffers and bacini

The Pisan Romanesque style had sprung into popularity, "as if by magic", on a location in Pisa that later became known as Piazza dei Miracoli. In a succession, the Pisa Cathedral (Duomo), Pisa Baptistery, the bell tower (now known as the Leaning Tower of Pisa), Camposanto Monumentale di Pisa were erected there. Few precursor structures that exhibited some of the elements of the style can be pointed to (Collareta lists Basilica of San Zeno, Verona, San Piero a Grado, apse of the church of Santa Cristina on the left bank of the Arno). Although these buildings introduced some features similar to the Pisan Romanesque as defined by the Duomo (long rows of blind arches under the eaves, ceramic bacini inside the arches, wall ornaments made of round or diamond-shaped coffers), their connections to the Duomo, the grand "overture" of the style, are relatively weak. The style primarily originated with construction of the Pisa Cathedral and is credited to its architects, Buscheto and his successor Rainaldo.

The well-defined style was popular from the 11th to early 13th century. while the Republic of Pisa was at its peak. The Pisan Romanesque style exhibited unusual longevity; some elements of it were visible in new construction in Pisa even after a switch to Gothic architecture later in the 13th century.

=== Features ===
The style successfully fused together elements that came from multiple diverse sources:

- superposition of loggias, piers and arcading came from Lombard Romanesque;
- overall plans were borrowed from the Roman-Christian architecture;
- dome of the cathedral was lifted from Byzantine architecture;
- some other features (corner niches with oval cupola, colored marble inserts and dark stripes on the external walls) came from Byzantine or Islamic architecture.

=== Influence ===
Researchers name some notable structures immediately influenced by the original buildings on the Piazza:

- San Paolo a Ripa d'Arno, also in Pisa (a small-scale version of the Duomo);
- Santo Sepolcro, Pisa, a small-scale version of the Duomo;
- San Frediano, Pisa that borrowed from the Baptistry (and Dome of the Rock);
- multiple churches nearby: Sant'Agata Chapel, San Pierino, San Frediano, Sant'Andrea, San Paolo all'Orto, and San Michele in Borgo.

The influence of the Pisan Romanesque spread wide beyond Pisa:

- due to Pisa being an important maritime power at the time, its architecture was exported to areas then-controlled by Pisa: Sardinia and Corsica, Liguria, Apulia, and even to the shores of the Adriatic Sea (Marche and Croatia);
- on land, the style affected multiple location that had business ties with Pisa, in particular Lucca and Pistoia.

The notable and geographically spread examples include parts of Genoa Cathedral, San Giovanni Fuoricivitas, Santa Guista in Bazzano, Massa Marittima Cathedral, Troia Cathedral.

== Sources ==
- Valdes, G.; Pistolesi, A.; Pauli, E. (1994). "Pisan Romanesque". Art and History of Pisa. Art and History Series. Bonechi. p. 7. ISBN 978-88-8029-024-7.
- Collareta, Marco (2022-04-15). "Art in Pisa in the Middle Ages". A Companion to Medieval Pisa. BRILL. pp. 435–455. doi:10.1163/9789004512719_020. ISBN 978-90-04-51271-9.
- Barsali, Isa Belli (1972). "Buscheto (Busketus, Buschetto, Boschetto)". Dizionario Biografico degli Italiani (in Italian). Vol. 15: Buffoli–Caccianemici. Rome: Istituto dell'Enciclopedia Italiana. ISBN 978-88-12-00032-6.
- Conant, K.J. (1993). Carolingian and Romanesque Architecture, 800 to 1200. The Yale University Press Pelican History of Art Series. Yale University Press. ISBN 978-0-300-05298-5.
