= Corso Italia =

Corso Italia is a street name common for the main promenade in cities in Italy and Little Italy neighborhoods of the Italian diaspora.

== Italy ==
- Corso Italia (Milan)
- Corso Italia (Genoa)
- Corso Italia, Pisa

== Abroad ==
- Corso Italia (Ottawa)
- Corso Italia (Toronto)
