= Roberto Mariani =

Roberto Mariani may refer to:

- Roberto Mariani (architect) (1938-2001), Italian urban planner and architect
- Roberto Mariani (football manager) (born 1942), Argentine football manager
- Roberto Mariani (politician) (born 1965), Italian politician
