= Santa Apollonia =

Santa Apollonia may refer to:

- Saint Apollonia
- Santa Apollonia (Pisa), a church in Pisa, Italy
- Réunion island, known as Santa Apollonia when it was ruled by the Portuguese
