= Aurelio Lomi =

Italian painter (1556–1622)

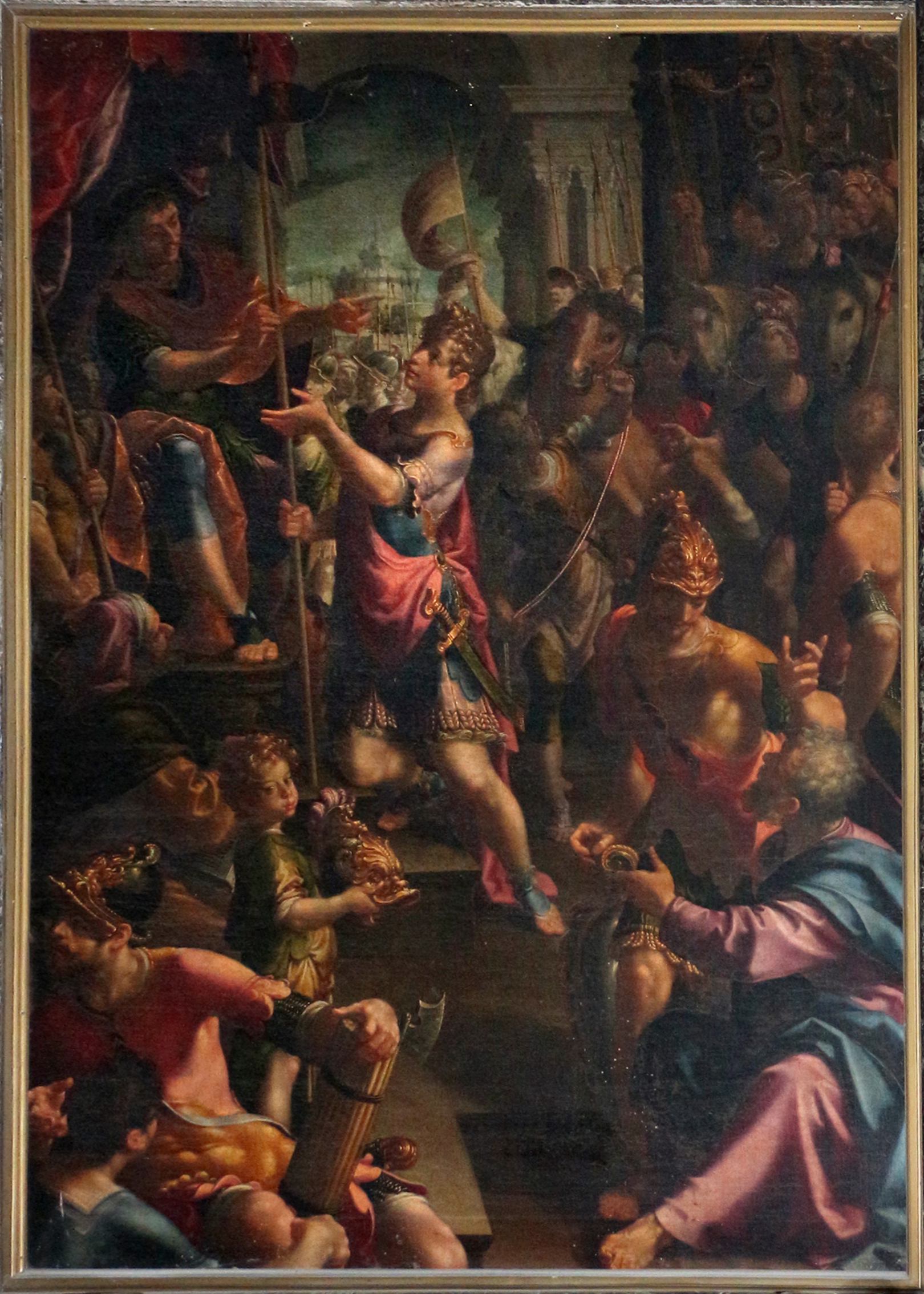
St Sebastian before the Roman Emperor, at the Church of Santissima Annunziata, Florence.

Aurelio Lomi (29 February 1556 – 1622) was an Italian painter of the late-Renaissance and early-Baroque periods, active mainly in his native town of Pisa, in the Grand Duchy of Tuscany.

== Biography ==
The brother of the painters Orazio Gentileschi (who would be one of his pupils) and Baccio Lomi, he may have initially been trained by his father, Giovanni Battista Lomi, but soon he worked in Florence (1580–1590) under the painters Alessandro Allori and Lodovico Cardi (known as Cigoli). In Pisa, he painted a St. Jerome (1595) for the Duomo of Pisa, in addition to frescoes for San Frediano and Santo Stefano. He painted an altarpiece for Santa Apollonia.

He also worked in Rome and Genoa. He painted a St. Anthony of Padua for the church of San Francesco di Castelletto in Genoa, and a Resurrection of Christ and Last Judgement for Santa Maria Assunta in Carignano. In Rome, he painted frescoes in the Pinelli chapel of Chiesa Nuova, including Scenes from the Life of the Virgin and Birth of Jesus on the arches, and the Dormition, Coronation, and Funeral of the Madonna on the vault. The walls are frescoed with Rebecca and Eleazar and Yael and Sisera.

Besides his half-brother Orazio Gentileschi, his pupils included Orazio Riminaldi, Simone Balli, Domenico Fiasella, Pietro Gnocchi, and Augustin Montanari.

== Works ==
- Saint Anthony of Padua, Church of San Francesco, Castelletto, Genoa
- Resurrection and Last Judgement, Santa Maria in Carignano, Genoa
- Birth of the Virgin, church of San Siro (Genoa).
- Deposition from the Cross

=== Works in Pisa ===
- Madonna and Angels, Palazzo Gambacorti.
- Saint Jerome (1595), Pisa Cathedral.
- Virtue, Church of San Michele in Borgo.
- Adoration by the Magi, Church of San Frediano.
- Glory of St. Thomas (1563) Church of Santa Caterina d'Alessandria.
- Madonna and Child behind Saint Joseph and Stephen (1593), Church of Santo Stefano dei Cavalieri.
- Madonna with saints Ranieri, Torpè, and Leonardo. San Ranierino.
