= Paolo Gerolamo Piola =

Italian painter

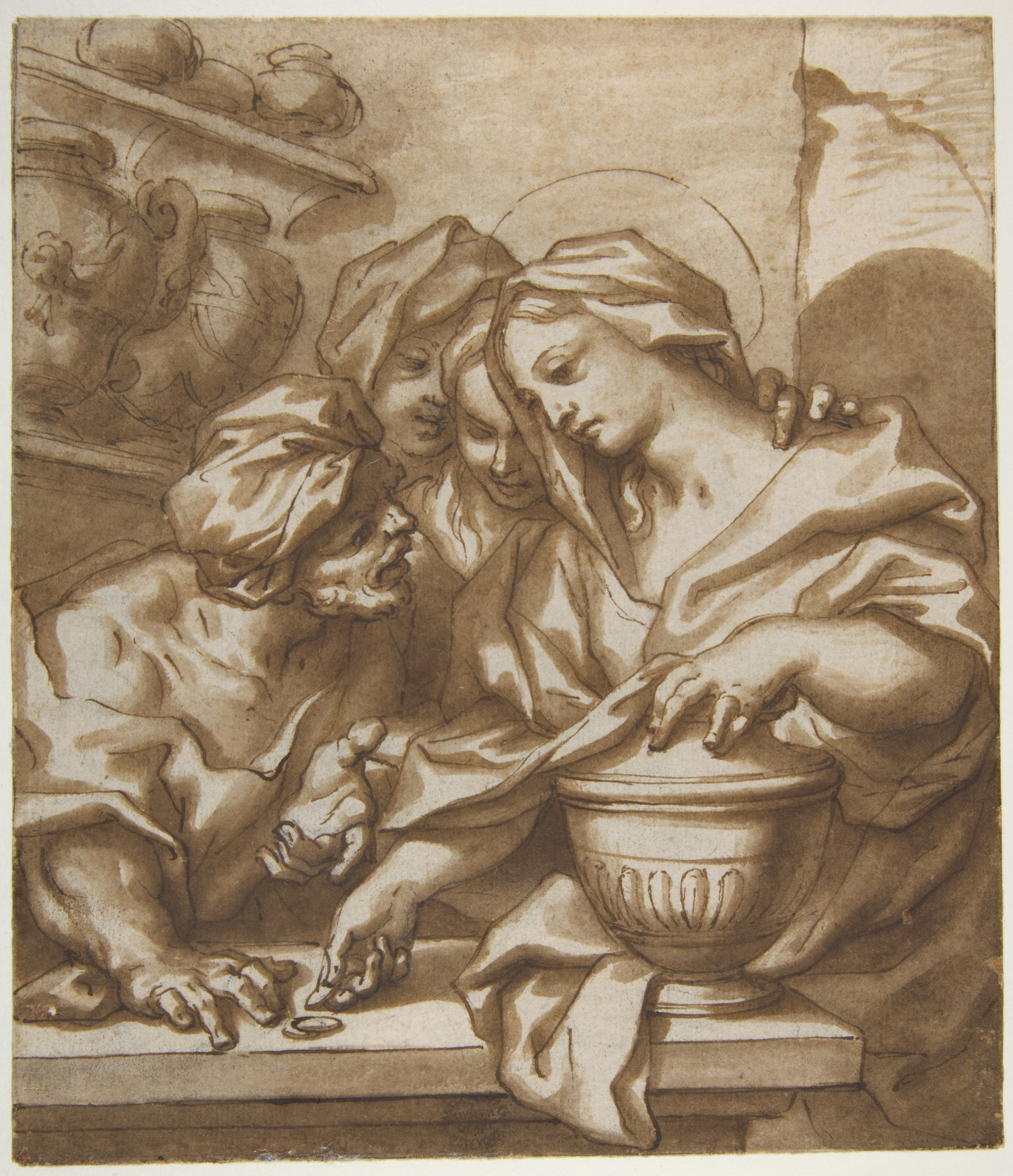
Mary Magdalen Buying Ointment, pen and brown ink on paper, Metropolitan Museum of Art, New York

Paolo Gerolamo Piola (1666–1724) was an Italian Baroque painter, residing mainly in Genoa. His father, Domenico Piola, was a prominent Genoese painter. Paolo Gerolamo was very active painting sacred subjects and frescoes.

He was sent to study in Rome by his father, where he supposedly studied the work of Carracci, and studied under Carlo Maratta. Returning to Genoa, his father found his style ponderous. He was ultimately praised for his designs and canvases for the church of Santa Maria di Carignano.
