= San Domenico, Pisa =

Roman Catholic church in Pisa, Italy

Coordinates: 43°42′40″N 10°23′59″E

Church of San Domenico
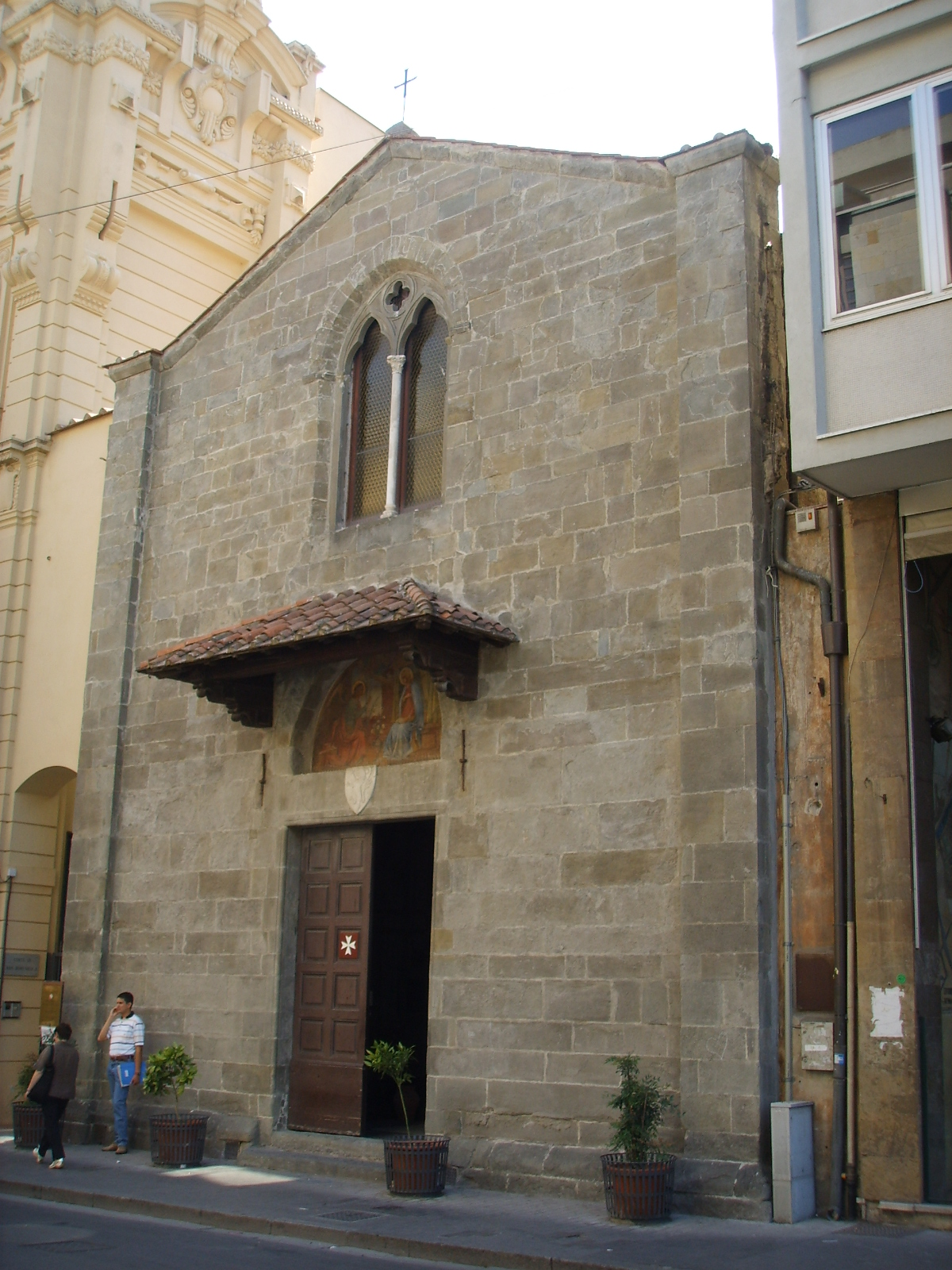
- The facade

Religion
- Affiliation: Roman Catholic
- Province: Pisa

Location
- Location: Pisa, Italy
- Interactive map of Church of San Domenico

Architecture
- Type: Church
- Style: Baroque interior.
- Groundbreaking: 13th Century

San Domenico is a Gothic-style, Roman Catholic church located on Corso Italia in Pisa, Italy. It was erected in 1385, under the guidance of Pietro Gambacorti, adjacent to a Dominican Convent. Pietro's daughter, the beatified Chiara Gambacorti, resided in that convent.

In 1724 through 1732, the interior was decorated in the ornate late-Baroque style. The church and the adjacent convent were extensively damaged during World War II. It is today in use by the Order of the Knights of Malta. The interior is decorated by medieval frescoes and canvases by Giovanni Battista Tempesti depicting the Life of the beatified Chiara (1782).

The church currently hosts a relic of Blessed Gerard, the founder of the Order of Malta.

== Gallery ==
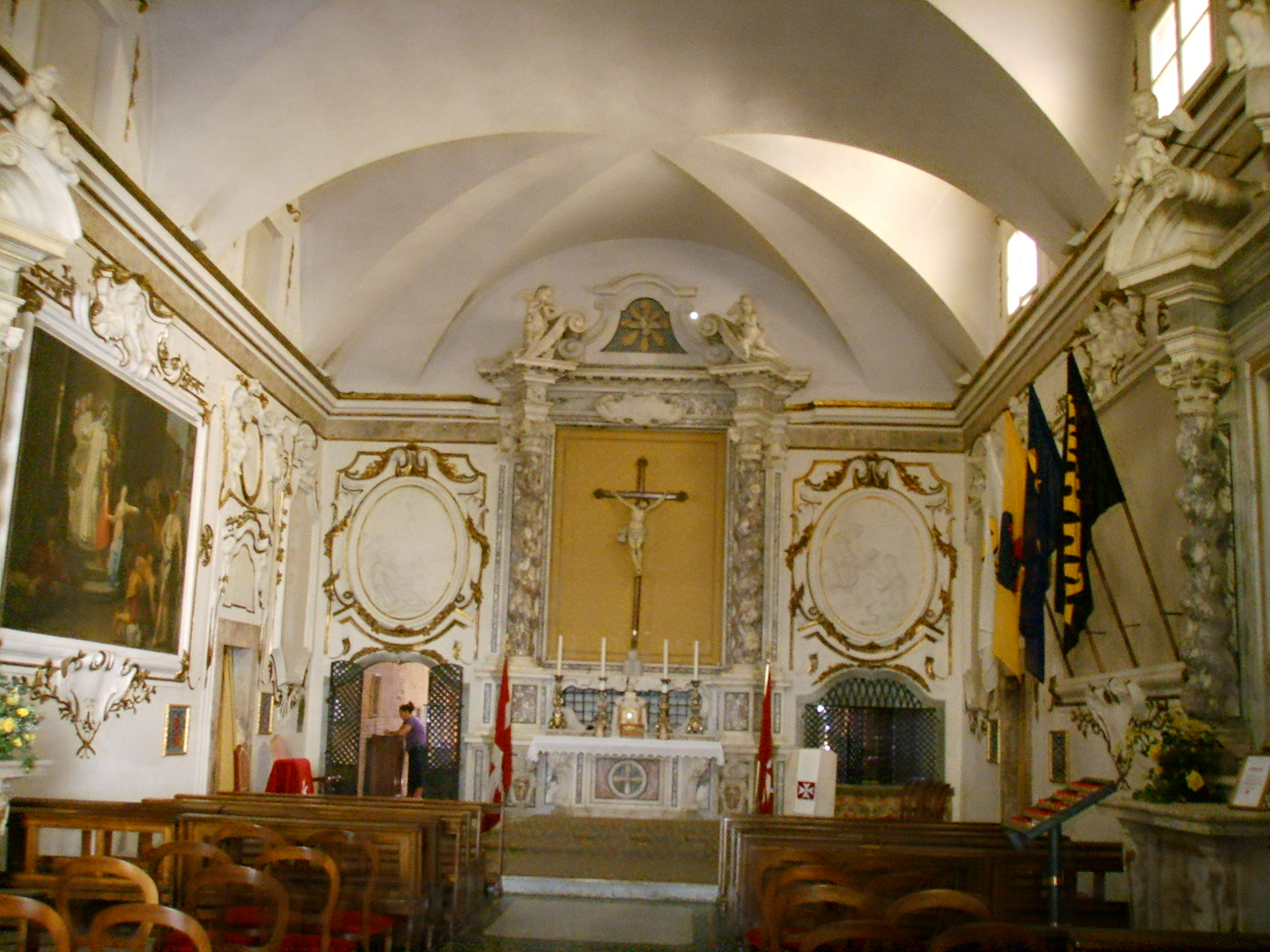
The interior.

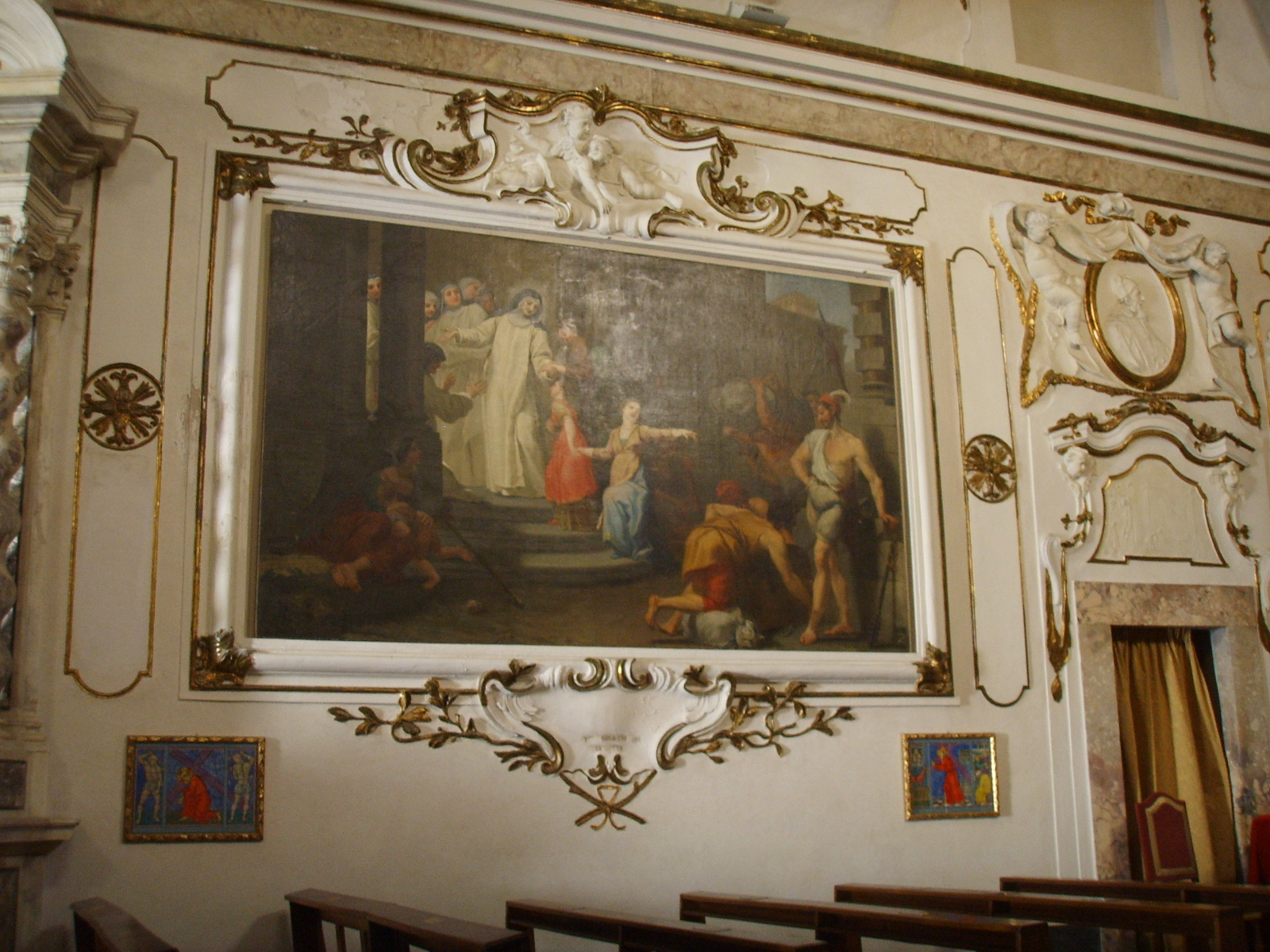
Painting.

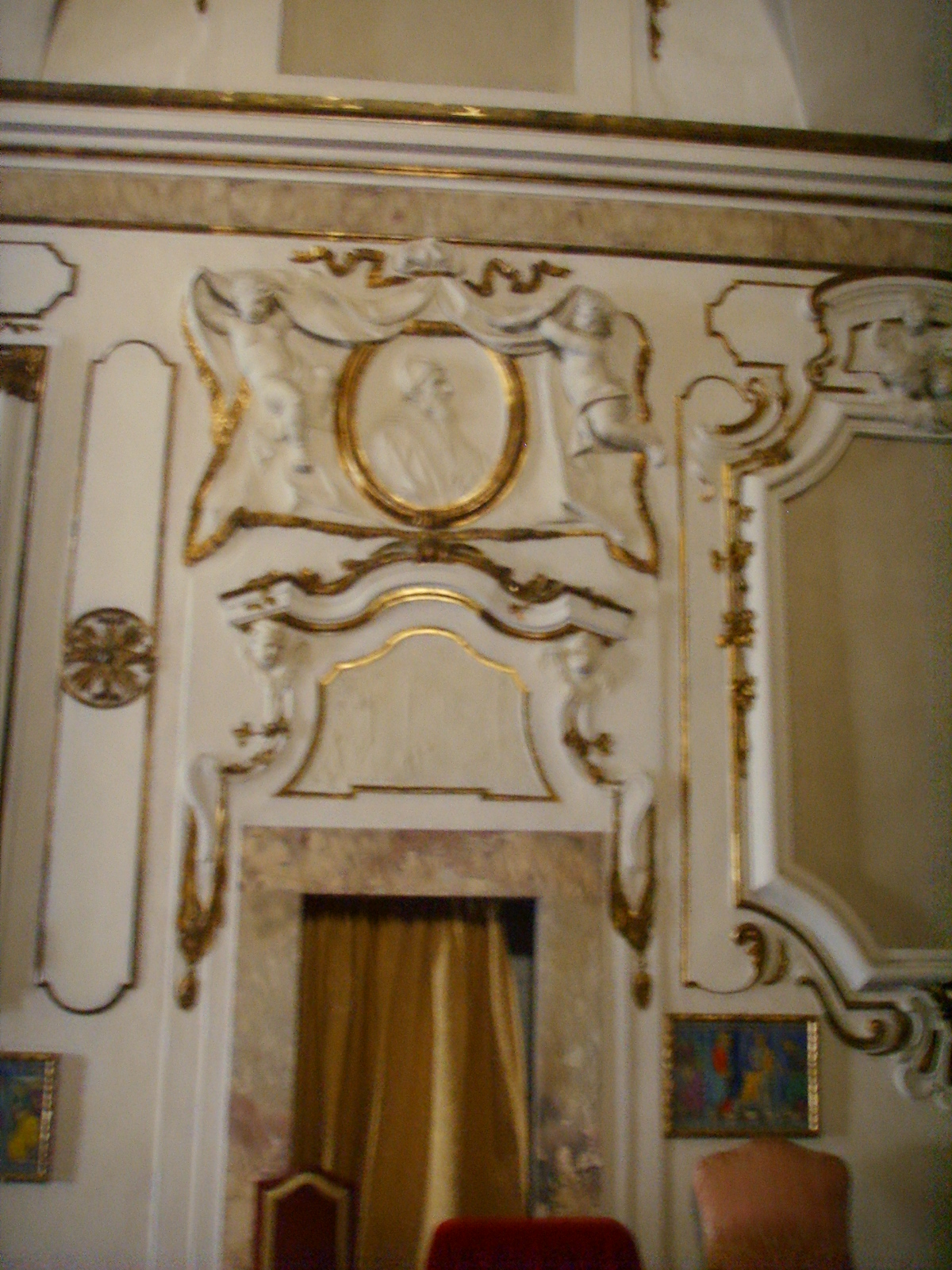
Stucco.

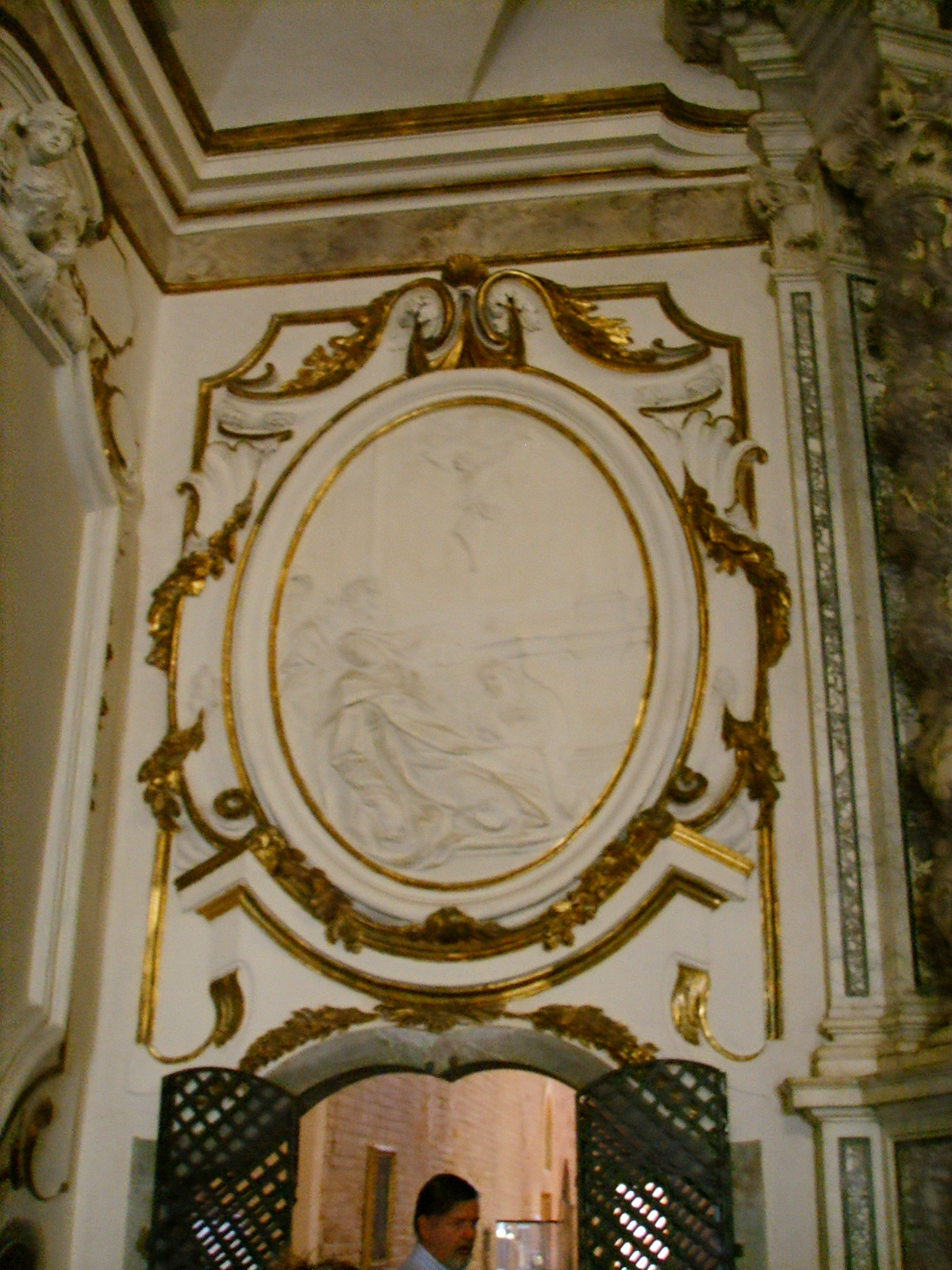
Stucco.
