= San Ranierino, Pisa =

Church building in Pisa, Italy

Coordinates: 43°43.37′N 10°23.91′E

Church of San Ranierino
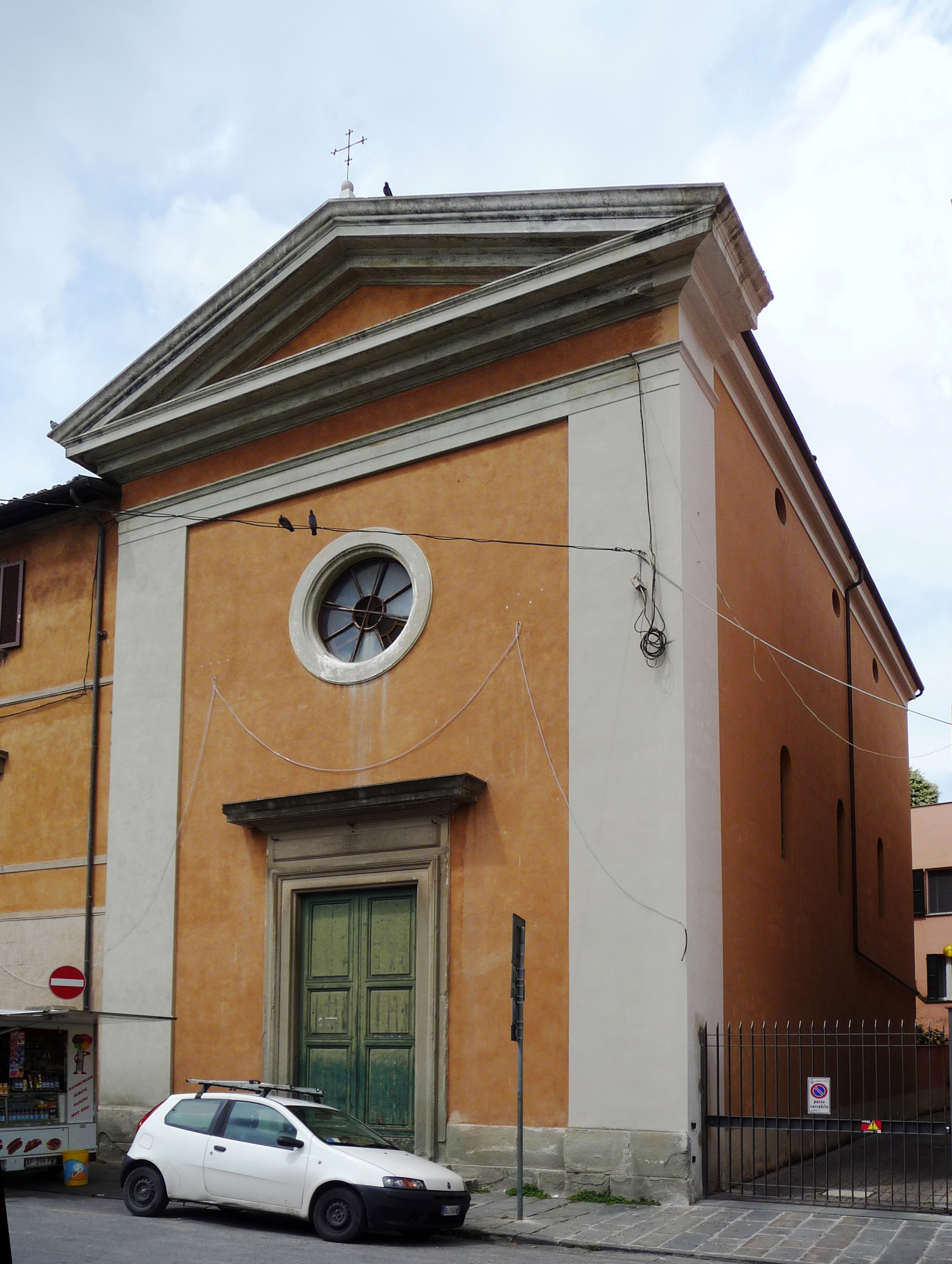
- The facade

Religion
- Affiliation: Roman Catholic
- Province: Pisa

Location
- Location: Pisa, Italy
- Interactive map of Church of San Ranierino

Architecture
- Type: Church

The church of San Ranierino (or Saints Ranieri and Leonardo) is a church located in central Pisa, Italy, near piazza del Duomo.

The present building was constructed on this site in the second half of the 19th century. The original church of this name stood adjacent to the hospital facing Piazza dei Miracoli. In 1868, as part of a large urban renewal directed by Luigi Torelli, that structure was demolished and rebuilt at this new site.

The church holds an altarpiece depicting Madonna with saints Ranieri, Torpè, and Leonardo by Aurelio Lomi. The marble main altar was completed in the 15th century by Andrea Guardi.
