= Chiara Gambacorti =

Italian Roman Catholic professed religious

Blessed Chiara Gambacorti O.P.
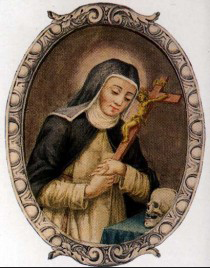

Religious
- Born: 1362; Venice, Republic of Venice
- Died: 17 April 1420; Pisa, Republic of Florence
- Venerated in: Roman Catholic Church
- Beatified: 4 March 1830, Saint Peter's Basilica, Papal States by Pope Pius VIII
- Feast: 17 April
- Attributes: Dominican habit; Crucifix

Chiara Gambacorti, OP (born Vittoria; 1362 – 17 April 1420) was an Italian Catholic nun in the Order of Preachers. She was born to rich merchants and was left a widow after a brief marriage. She escaped a second marriage after becoming a professed religious despite her father's fierce resistance.

She was beatified by Pope Pius VIII on 4 March 1830.

== Life ==
Vittoria Gambacorti was born in the Republic of Florence in 1362 to Pietro Gambacorti, a rich merchant who was sent into political exile that year. In 1369 political circumstances of Pisan politics saw them relocate to Pisa where her father was appointed as chief magistrate.

Gambacorti was a pious child who seemed to be destined for an arranged marriage that would bring with it numerous political advantages not for her benefit but rather for the benefit of her father and brothers. She accepted this as the will of her father and was married to Simone Massa in 1374. Sometime after this her father met with Catherine of Siena to discuss politics and Catherine met with Gambacorti and offered her both advice and encouragement on being a good wife and above all a dedicated Christian. Her time as a wife was cut short when her husband died of the plague in 1377 and despite her happiness as a wife she was more than reluctant to enter marriage again, though aware that her father was negotiating another marriage for her. Not long after the death of her husband she received a letter from Catherine who exhorted her to follow her faith.

The frightened girl fled her home and sought refuge with the Poor Clares at their convent of Santa Croce, taking "Chiara" as her religious name . Her brother found her and removed her from the convent so that the arranged marriage could go ahead. Her father locked her in a dark room and kept her isolated from her friends, and from church life. But with the aid of her mother she managed to smuggle jewels out from her room to friends so the proceeds of the jewels could be used for the poor, while her mother smuggled her out to Mass on one occasion when her father and brothers were not at home. Her father asked a visiting Spanish bishop – a former confessor to Bridget of Sweden – to persuade her to accept his views. But the bishop went against this and encouraged Gambacorti to pursue her call to the religious life, giving her father no other choice but to allow her to leave home. She had spent from 29 June 1376 to 30 November as her father's captive.

Gambacorti did not return to the Poor Clares but entered the Order of Preachers, inspired by Catherine's example; she made her profession in December 1378. The convent she joined was weak in its observance to the rule of Dominic of Osma so she – who favored a strict and rigorous implementation – arranged with her new stepmother for a new convent to be built. At the beginning of 1377 her father welcomed Pope Gregory XI in Livorno, when the pontiff was moving back from Avignon to Rome, and her father began work on a new church to celebrate the pontiff's return. The church of San Domenico was constructed in 1385 – at her father's orders – adjacent to her convent and she moved into the new convent completed on 29 August 1382. Gambacorti knew Marie Mancini around this time.

On 21 October 1392 thugs murdered Giovanni Lanfranchi and his son and sought refuge at the home of Jacopo d'Appiano who was plotting an insurrection against Gambacorti's father. Then her father was chased by this mob and killed with several blows of a sword and dagger in the street outside her convent. Two of his sons (Lorenzo and Benedetto) were attacked in the fight as well. Benedetto died in the skirmish but Lorenzo was wounded and rushed to the convent, pleading with his sister for refuge. She refused him due to her earlier familial memories and allowed him to die in the streets.

After it seemed that she would die she asked for food to be sent to her from the home of her father's murderer and the man's wife obliged, after which the man was killed. The widow and her daughters were then allowed to reside in the convent.

Gambacorti died in Pisa on 17 April 1420 and a legend stated that when one of the sisters at her convent was at the verge of death her bones would rattle in her coffin.

== Beatification ==
Her beatification received confirmation on 4 March 1830 from Pope Pius VIII after he confirmed the late nun's longstanding local 'cultus' (or popular devotion).
