= San Michele in Borgo =

Church in Pisa, Tuscany, Italy

Coordinates: 43°43′0.82″N 10°24′9.15″E

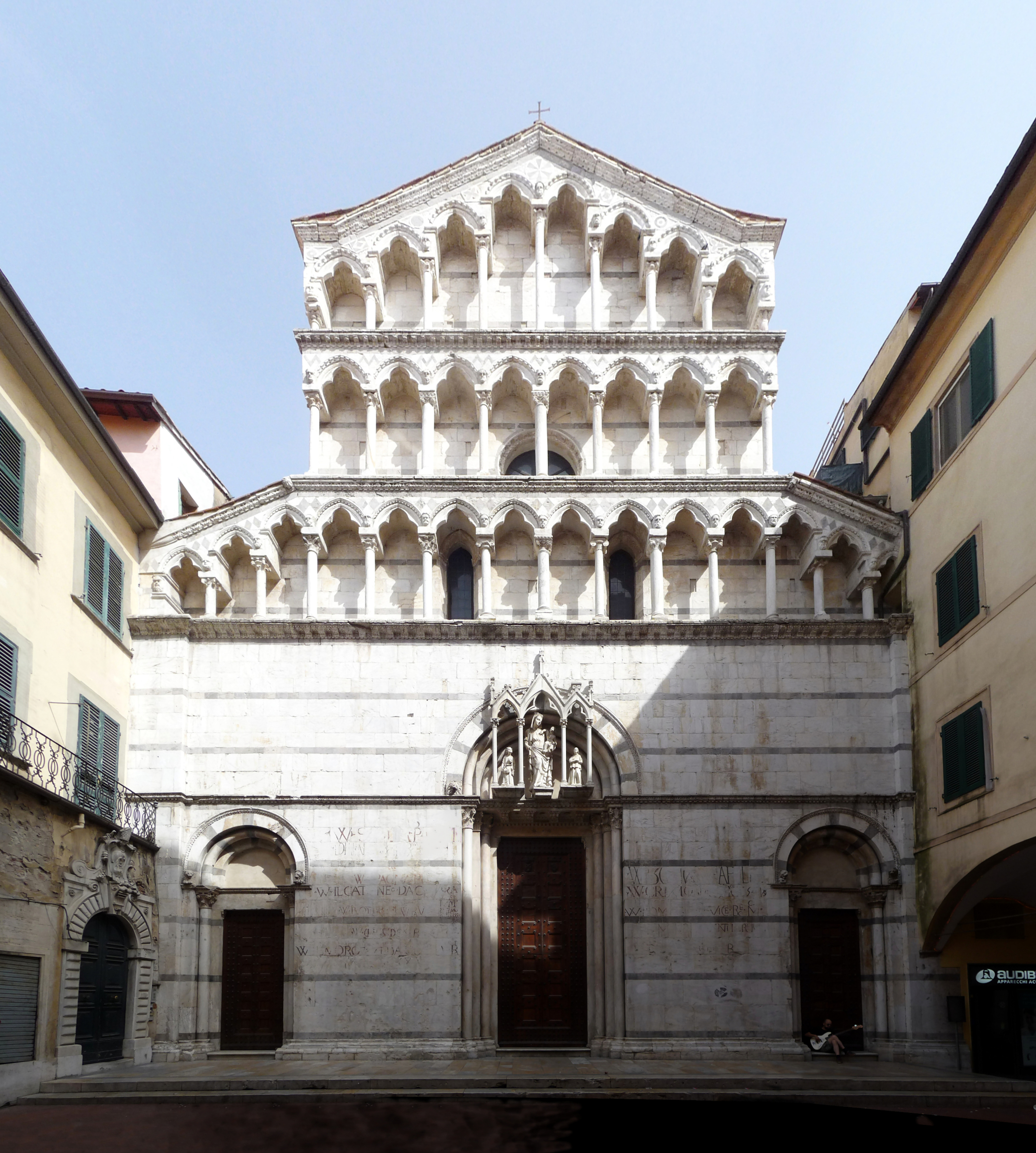
Façade.

San Michele in Borgo is a Roman Catholic church in Pisa, region of Tuscany, Italy.

== History ==
The church, together with the monastery (which first belonged to the Benedictines and, from the 12th century, the Camaldolese) was built in the late 10th to early 11th century outside the city's walls, over an ancient temple dedicated to Mars. Both were restored several times in the following ages.

The façade is from the 14th century. The upper part has three orders of typically Pisane Gothic loggias. There are three portals in Gothic style and withlunettes; the main one is surmounted by a tabernacle with "Madonna and Child" by Lupo di Francesco (the original is in the National Museum of San Matteo in Pisa).

The solemn interior, with a nave and two aisles, houses a Crucifix attributed to Nino Pisano (14th century), paintings by Matteo Rosselli, Baccio Lomi, Aurelio Lomi, and Giuseppe Melani, as well as remains of frescoes from the 13th century. Under the pavement is the crypt, probably what remains of a former church.
