= Sant'Andrea Forisportam, Pisa =

Church building in Pisa, Italy

Church of Sant'Andrea Forisportam
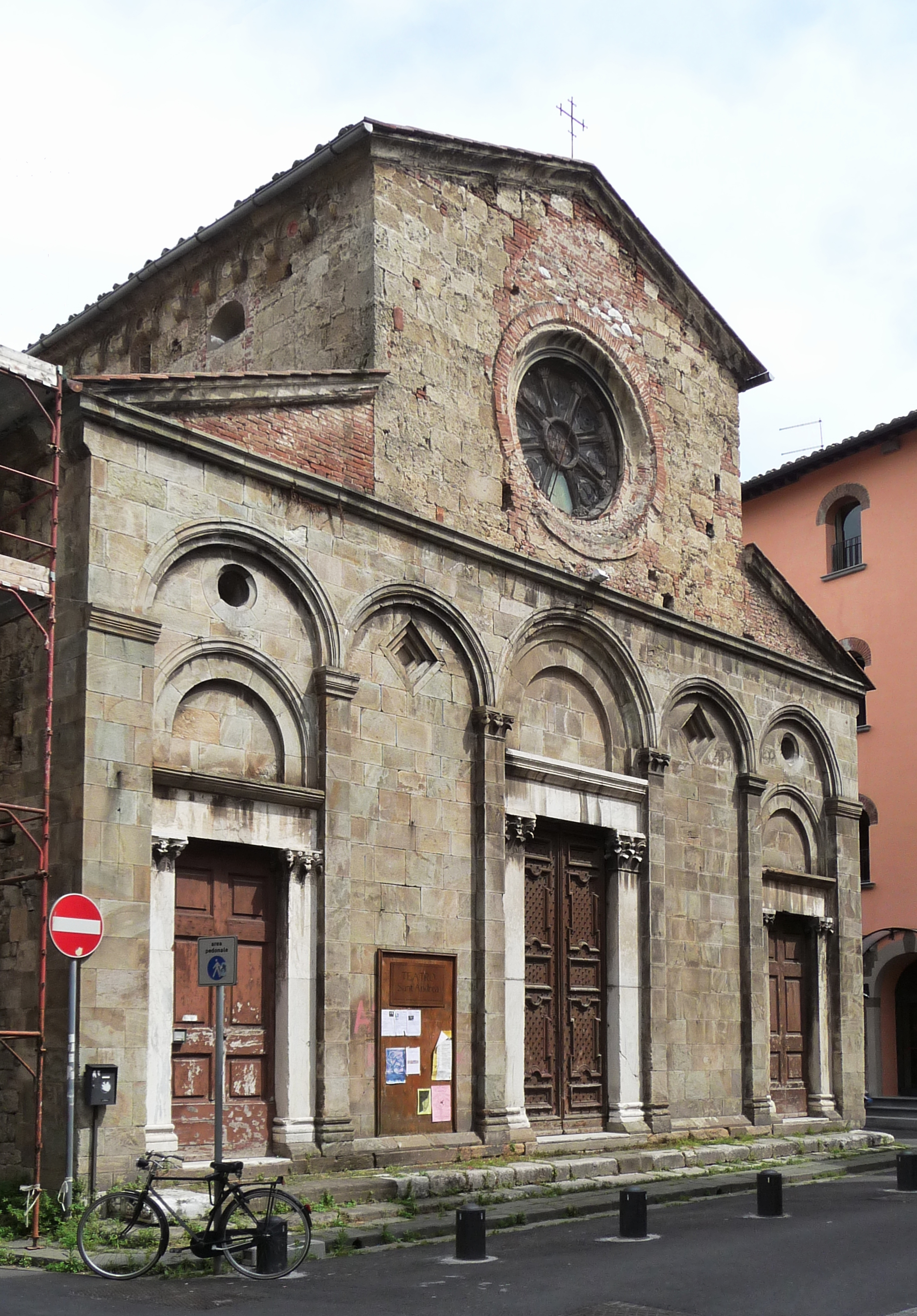

- Location within Italy

Religion
- Affiliation: Roman Catholic

Location
- Location: Pisa, Italy
- Coordinates: 43°42′58.17″N 10°24′19.98″E

Architecture
- Type: Church
- Style: Romanesque

Sant'Andrea Forisportam is a church building, now deconsecrated, in Pisa, Tuscany, Italy. It is currently used as a theatre for performances, most recently: Fonterossa Day on 16 April 2023.

== History ==
A church on the site is documented as early as 1104, the name deriving from its location outside a gate of the walls of medieval Pisa.

The church served as a parish church until 1839, under the jurisdiction of the church of San Pietro in Vinculis. In that year, it was deconsecrated and used as a fish-market.

In 1847, it became the chapter of the 'Union of the Sacred Heart of Holy Mary for the Conversion of the Sinful.

The church was heavily damaged during World War II, and restored and reopened to the public in 1948. It is no longer consecrated, and is now instead used for the theatrical performances of Teatro Sant'Andrea.

== Structure ==
Its simple structure consists of a central nave with two lesser flanking ones. The font is a copy of the original Islamic ceramic from the 11th century (now in National Museum of San Matteo, Pisa). The capitals on the internal columns were derived from ancient Roman originals.

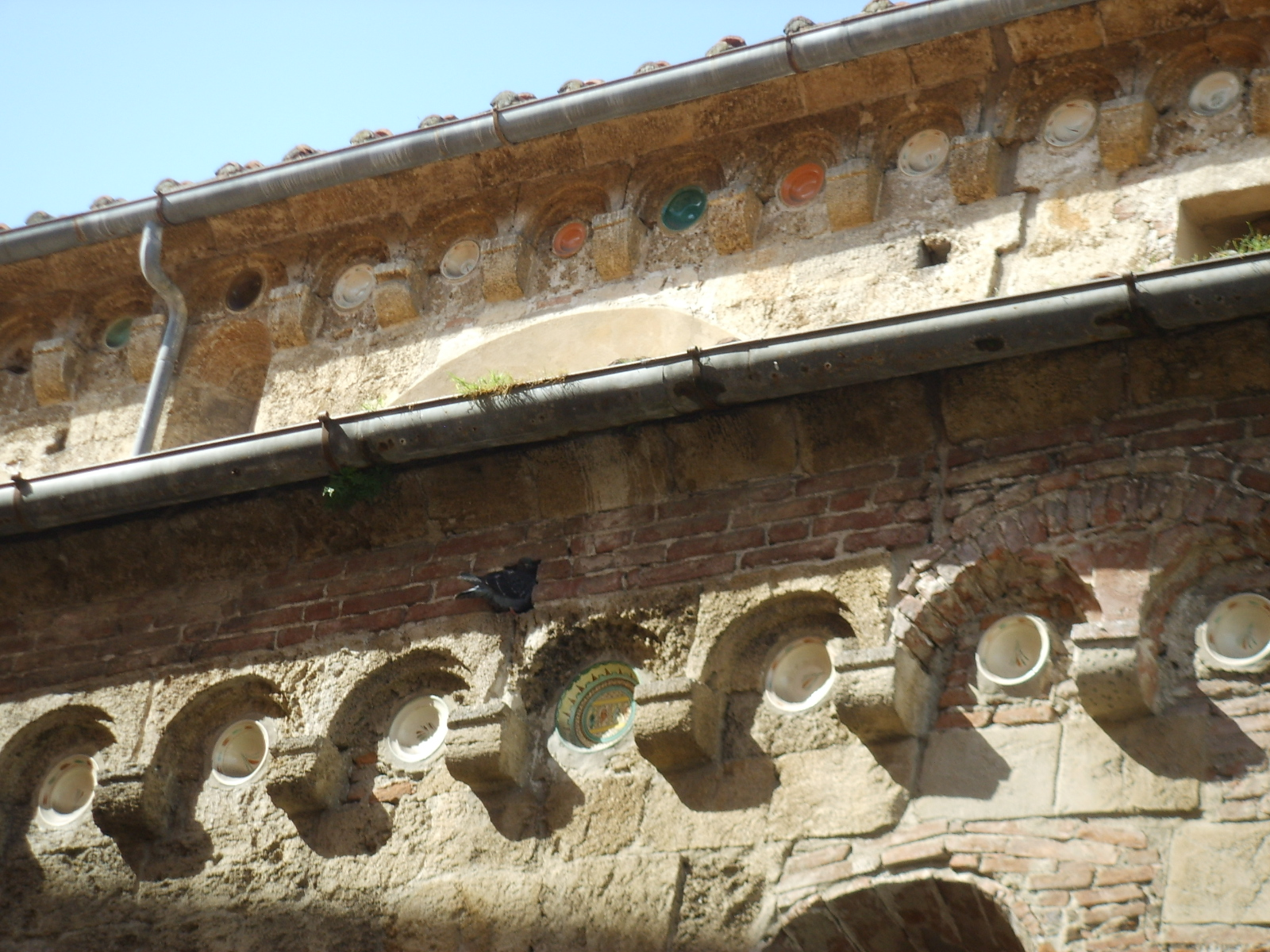
Ceramic detail of exterior.
