= Giovanni Domenico Piastrini =

Italian painter

Giovanni Domenico Piastrini (1678–1740) was an Italian painter of the Baroque period, active in Tuscany and Rome.

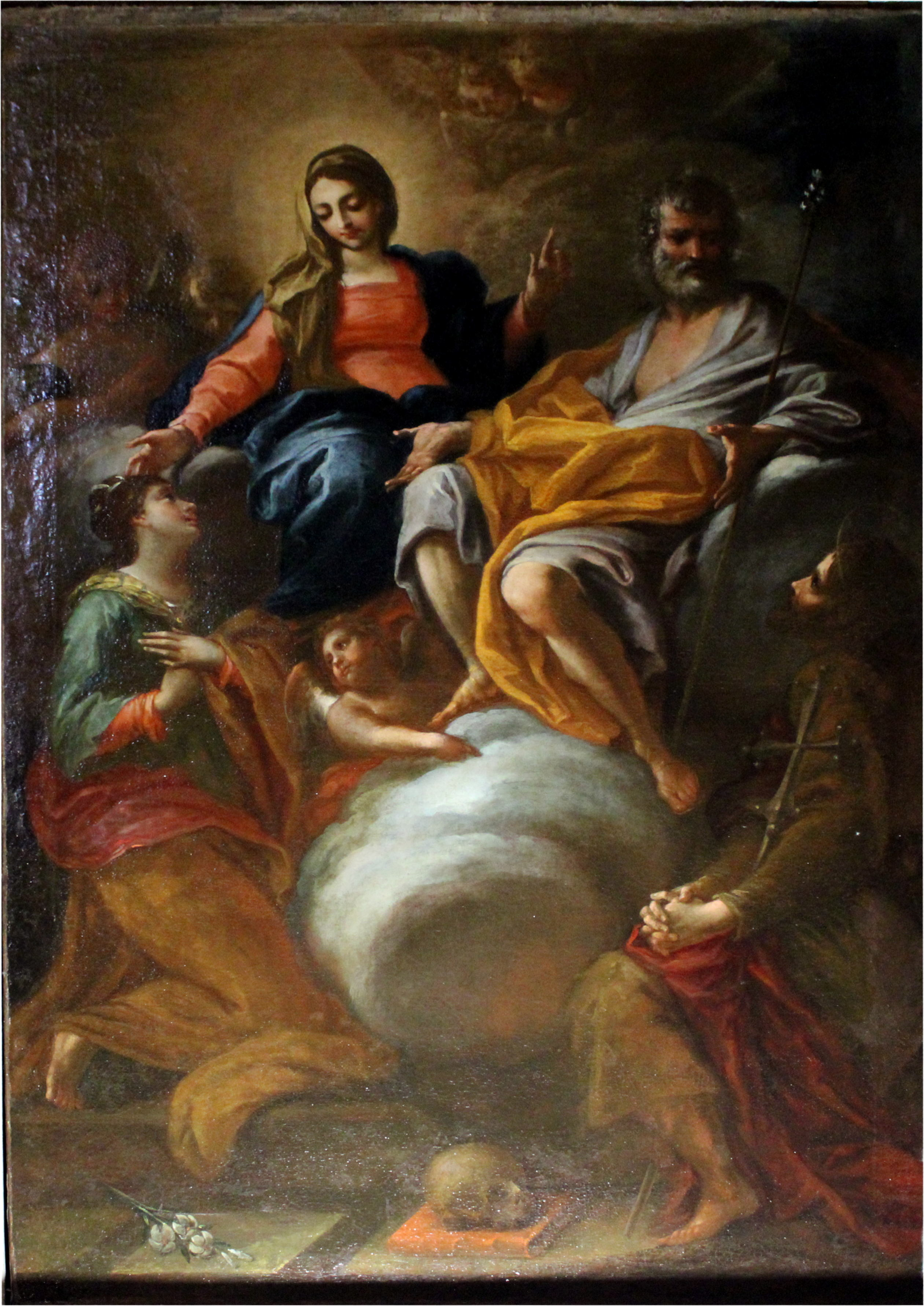
The Virgin in Glory with Saints Joseph, Vittoria and Ranieri, Santa Maria del Carmine, Pisa

== Biography ==
He learned first skills from his father, Francesco Maria, who had painted in the Annunziata and San Lorenzo churches of Florence. But then traveled to Rome to work in the studio of Benedetto Luti. He painted for the Basilica of our Lady of Humility in Pistoia. He also painted altarpieces for churches in Rome (including Santa Maria in Via Lata) and Pisa. He died in Rome.

Among his works are a canvas depicting Emperor Trajan condemning Saint Ignatius of Antioch (1710–1716) at the Galleria Nazionale d'Arte Antica in Palazzo Barberini, Rome; a Marriage at Cana at Bob Jones University Museum & Gallery, Greenville, South Carolina; a Meal of St Phillip Benizi (1723–1724) at the church of Santa Maria in Via, Rome; and a Virgin in Glory with Saints Joseph, Vittoria, and Ranieri for the church of Santa Maria del Carmine, Pisa.
