= San Frediano, Pisa =

Church in Pisa, Italy

Coordinates: 43.717964°N 10.399372°E

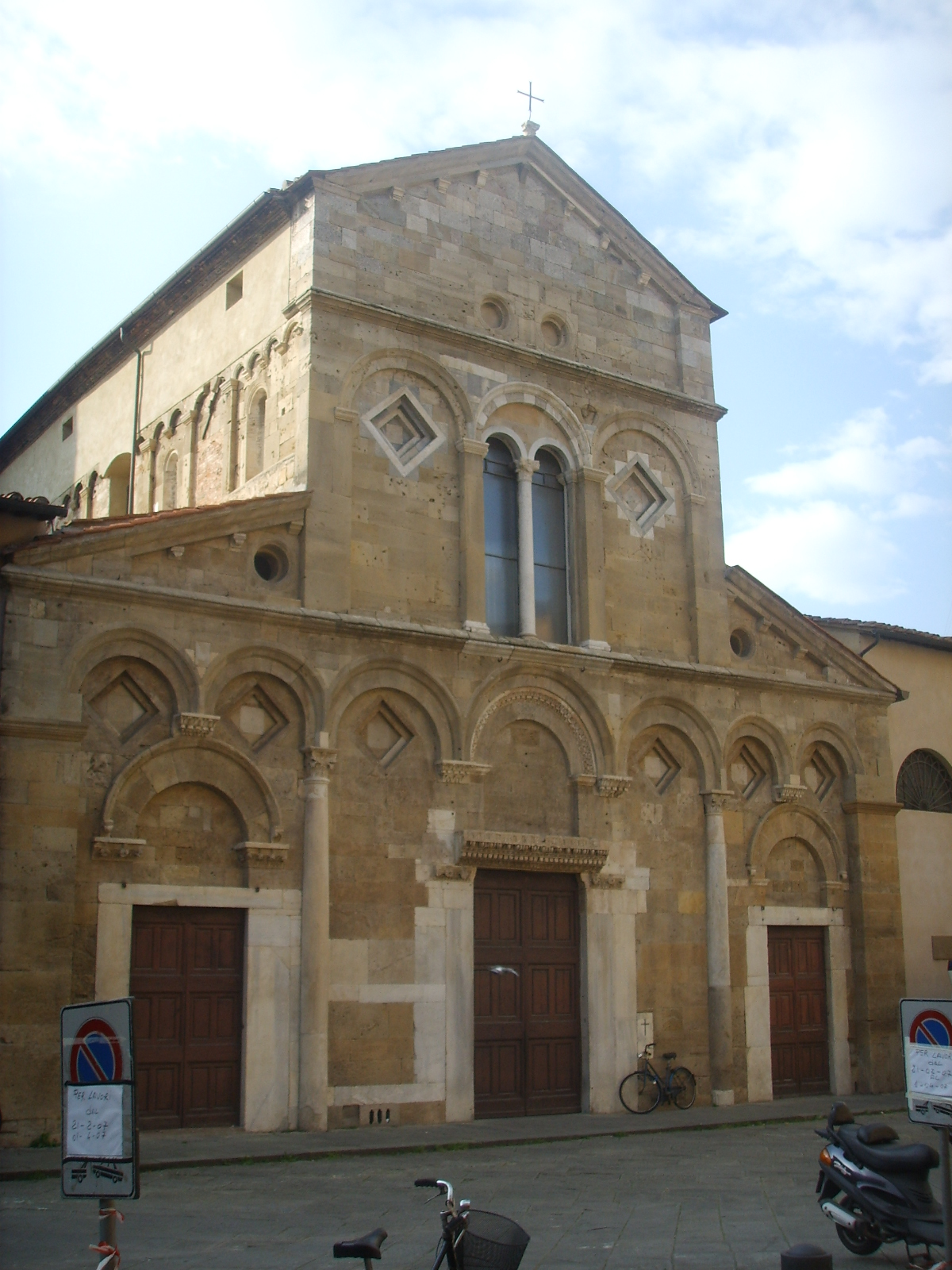
The church of San Frediano

San Frediano is a Romanesque-style Roman Catholic church in Pisa, Tuscany, Italy. It now functions as the official church of the University of Pisa.

== History ==
Its existence is documented as early as 1061. Founded by the family Buzzaccherini-Sismondi and originally dedicated to Saint Martin, it once had a hospital annexed to it.

The Romanesque façade, dating to the early 12th-century shows some of the typical features of the Pisan Romanesque style, such as the blind arcades, the lozenges and the use of bichrome stones (present also in the city's cathedral). The upper section is crowned by a large mullioned window.

The interior, despite being damaged by fire in 1675, has maintained the original basilica plan with a central nave and two aisles. The marble columns have capitals decorated with Romanesque-style sculpted figures. It houses a rare wooden cross painted on a gilded panel and titled the Crucifix and Histories of the Passion (12th century), several Baroque altars and a few 17th-century paintings by Ventura Salimbeni (Annunciation and Nativity), Aurelio Lomi (Adoration of the Magi), as well as frescoes by Domenico Passignano. The frescoes of the dome were completed by Rutilio Manetti.

The sturdy bell tower is in brickwork.
