= Santa Maria Assunta, Genoa =

Renaissance church in Genoa, Italy

Basilica di Santa Maria Assunta
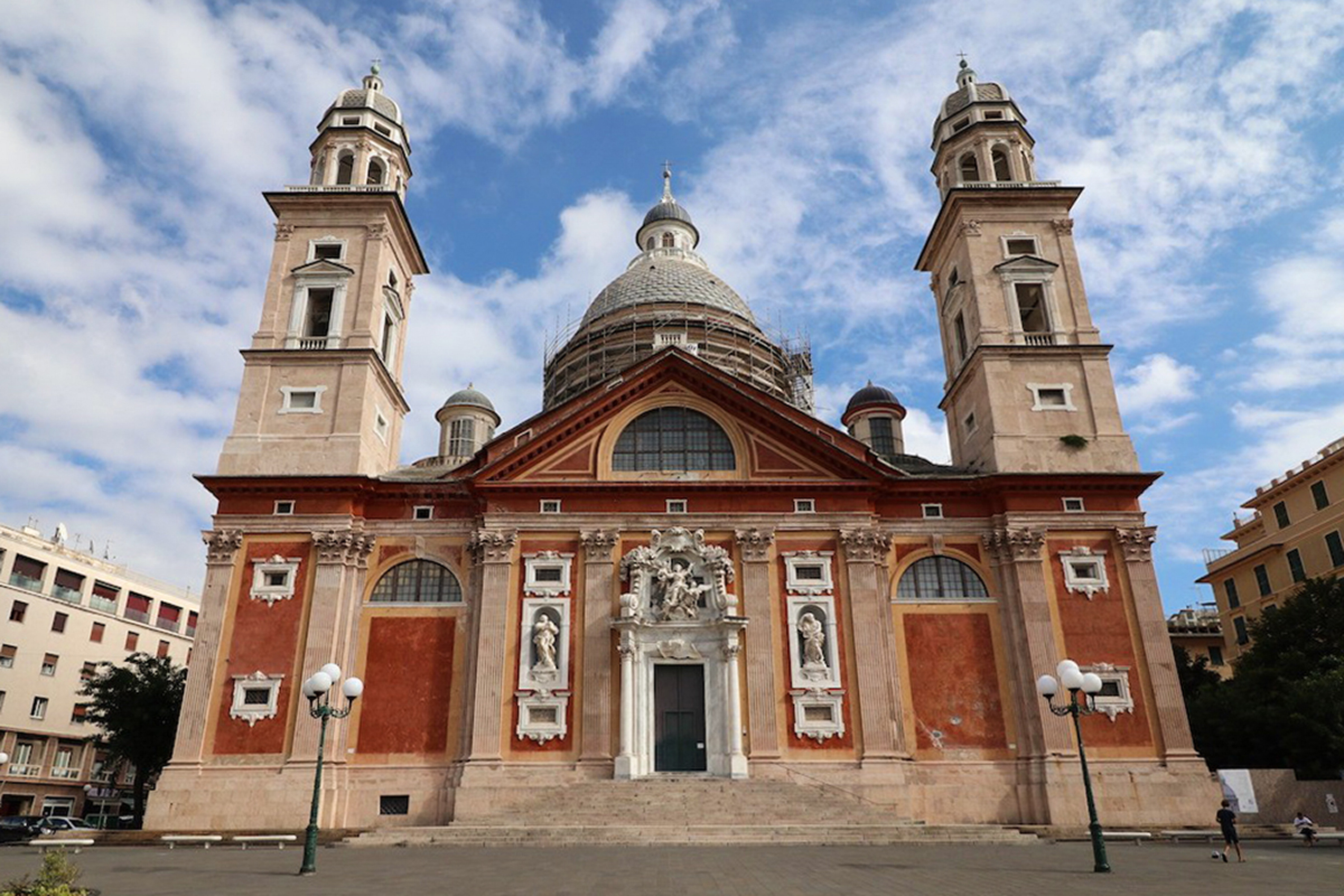
- Façade of the basilica.

Religion
- Affiliation: Roman Catholic
- Province: Genoa
- Ecclesiastical or organisational status: National monument
- Year consecrated: 1951
- Status: Active

Location
- Location: Genoa, Italy
- Interactive map of Basilica di Santa Maria Assunta
- Coordinates: 44°24′07.33″N 8°56′06.35″E

Architecture
- Type: Church
- Style: Renaissance
- Groundbreaking: 1522
- Completed: 19th century

Santa Maria Assunta is a Renaissance church in Genoa, Italy. It is located in a residential sector called Carignano located on the hills just above the city center, thus the church is also known as Santa Maria Assunta di Carignano.

== Structure and facade ==
The church is on the Greek cross plan with four similar façades on each side. There are five domes and two squared-plan bell towers (four in the original design) at the Neoclassic main façade. The facade has two statues by Claude David.

== Interior decoration ==
The interior is lavishly decorated by late Renaissance and Baroque artists.

The four niches of the interior of the pylons of the dome have statues of Blessed Alessandro Sauli and St Sebastian (1668), (right) by Pierre Puget; and on the left, St Bartholomew (1695), by Claude David and St John the Baptist by Filippo Parodi. Along the walls, the statues of apostles and doctors of the church were completed by 1740 by Francesco Schiaffino.

The altars along the right nave include paintings of St Peter Healing the Lame (1694–1696) at the first altar by Domenico Piola; Martyrdom di San Biagio, (1680) at the second altar by Carlo Baratta; Resurrection of Christ, lateral to 2nd altar by Aurelio Lomi; Annunciation by Ottavio Semino; Virgin with Saints Domenic and Rosa at the third altar by Paolo Gerolamo Piola; Viaticum of St. Magdalene at the fourth altar by Francesco Vanni.

The altars along the left nave include paintings of Blessed Alessandro Sauli Stops the Plague, (c. 1630) at the fifth altar by Domenico Fiasella; Pietà, (c. 1571) at the sixth altar by Luca Cambiaso; Last Judgement, lateral to sixth altar by Aurelio Lomi and Vision of St Domenic by Domenico Fiasella; Madonna with Saints Charles Borromeo and Francis of Assisi, (c. 1620) at the seventh altar by Giulio Cesare Procaccini; and St Francis of Assisi receives stigmata, at the eighth altar by Guercino.

The presbytery and main altar have paintings depicting of the Last Supper and Flight to Egypt by Giuseppe Palmieri. The marble and bronze main altar (1700) was created from designs by Massimiliano Soldani with a bronze crucifix by Pietro Tacca, replacing a prior one by Pierre Puget. The sacristy has a canvas of a Holy Family by Luca Cambiaso.

== See also ==
- 16th-century Western domes

== Sources ==
- Preste, Torti, Viazzi (1997). Sei itinerari in Portoria. Genoa: Samizdat. p. 119.
