= Corso Italia, Pisa =

Street in Pisa, Italy

Corso Italia
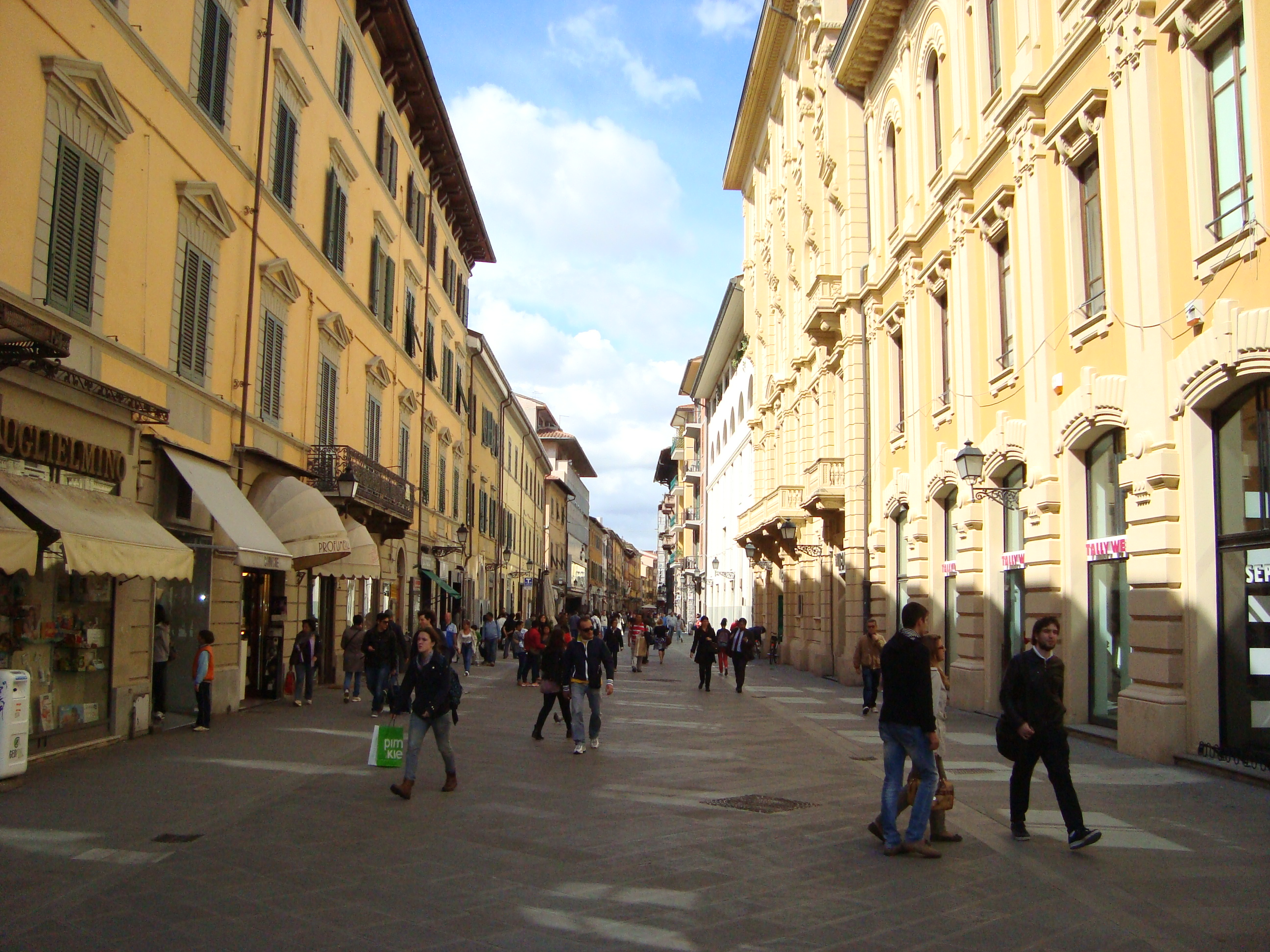
- Interactive map of Corso Italia
- Former names: Carraia San Gilio; Via del Carmine; Via Vittorio Emanuele II
- Namesake: Italy
- Type: Public
- Location: Pisa, Tuscany, Italy
- Coordinates: 43.7131°N 10.4003°E

Corso Italia is the main promenade of the southern area of the historic city centre of Pisa, Italy.

== History ==
The street has medieval origins, originally called "Carraia San Gilio" after a now-vanished church and a city gate. Later, it was called "Via del Carmine" due to the presence of a church of the same name, and was eventually renamed "Via Vittorio Emanuele II" after Italy's unification. In 1864, with the opening of the railway station, the San Gilio gate and the surrounding walls were demolished. During World War II, many buildings were damaged by air raids, and the destroyed area of San Domenico was redeveloped in 1992 by architect Roberto Mariani.

== Buildings and monuments ==
- Palazzo Simoneschi
- Palazzo Gambacorta
- Palazzo Mastiani Brunacci
- Palazzo Vincenti
- Palazzo Venerosi Pesciolini
- Statue of Nicola Pisano
- Church of Santa Maria del Carmine
- Church of San Domenico
