= Roberto Mariani (architect) =

Italian architect (1938–2001)

- Born: 26 June 1938; Pisa, Kingdom of Italy
- Died: 25 February 2001 (aged 62); Pisa, Tuscany, Italy
- Education: University of Florence
- Occupations: Architect, urban planner

Roberto Mariani (26 June 1938 – 25 February 2001) was an Italian architect and urban planner, mainly active in his native Tuscany.

== Life and career ==
Mariani was born in Pisa in 1938. After graduating from the University of Florence, he began collaborating with various firms in 1970, including that of Francesco Tomassi, contributing to significant projects such as the headquarters of the Italian Communist Party (PCI) in Pisa, recognized as an innovative example. Simultaneously, he dedicated himself to design work, collaborating with Dino Gavina and other furniture companies, and participating in exhibitions like the 1971 Spoleto Festival.

He was also active in politics and administration, serving as a member of the Architects' Guild, a regional consultant for Tuscany, and a member of building and urban planning commissions in the municipalities of Pisa, Pontedera, and Calci. His work received national recognition through publications and awards, including the Gubbio Prize in 1996.

Mariani's most notable projects in Pisa include the urban redevelopment of the "Corti di San Domenico" in Corso Italia, the residential complex on Via Contessa Matilde, office towers in Cisanello, the headquarters of the Public Assistance organization in Pisanova, the Scuderie Nuove equestrian complex in Barbaricina, the middle school in Vecchiano, the "Giovanni Carmignani" educational campus at the University of Pisa, and the new cemetery in Cascina.

In the urban planning field, he developed proposals for the redevelopment of the Pisa coastline and planned various municipalities, including Vecchiano, Collesalvetti, San Miniato, and Lorenzana. Mariani died in 2001.

== Sources ==
- Andrea Aleardi; Corrado Marcetti, eds. (2011). L'architettura in Toscana dal 1945 ad oggi. Una guida alla selezione delle opere di rilevante interesse storico-artistico. Florence: Alinea.
- Arrighetti, Teresa; Banchetti, Francesca (2001). "Roberto Mariani. Ricordo di un maestro". Albo d'onore degli Architetti Pianificatori Paesaggisti e Conservatori della Provincia di Pisa: 146–149.
- Arrighetti, Teresa (2004). "Le ricostruzioni di Roberto Mariani". Architetture Pisane. Rivista di architettura (4): 28–39.
- Guazzelli, Sara; Ulivieri, Denise (2016). Roberto Mariani architetto. Senza clamore e dissonanze. Pisa: Pisa University Press.
- Elisabetta Insabato; Cecilia Ghelli, eds. (2007). Guida agli archivi di architetti e ingegneri del Novecento in Toscana. Florence: Edifir. pp. 234–239.
