= Palazzo Gambacorti =

Coordinates: 43.71564°N 10.40122°E

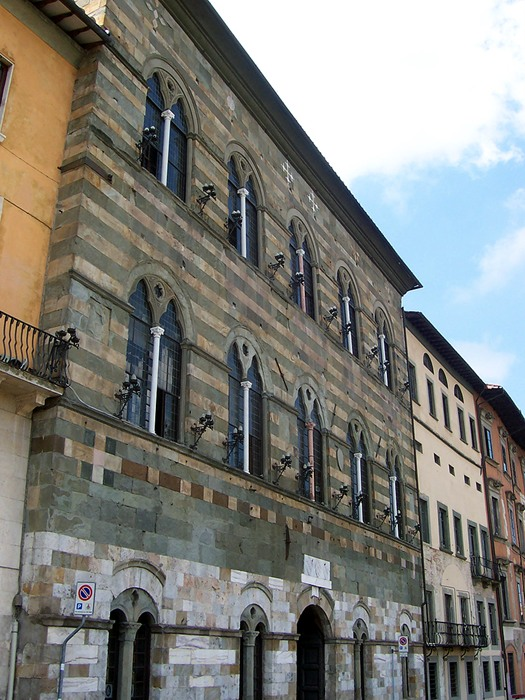
Palazzo Gambacorti facade along Arno river

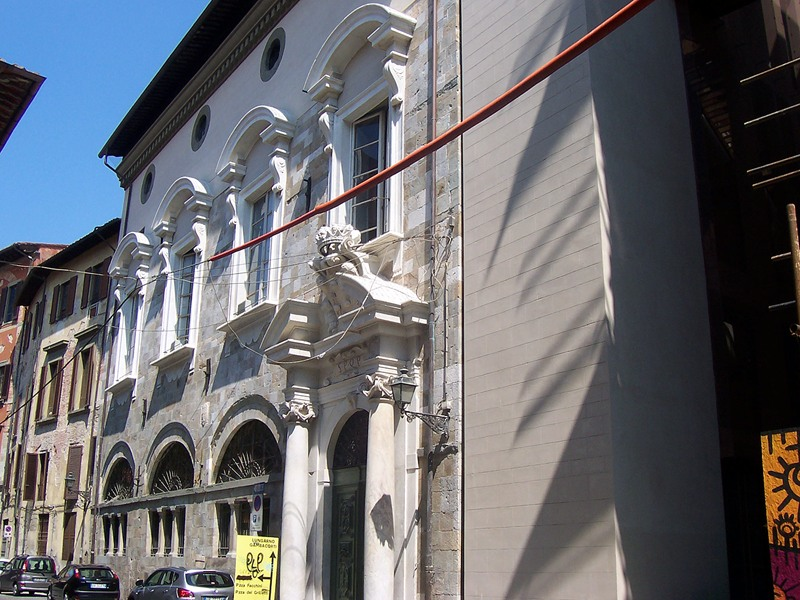
Via Tosellis facade

Palazzo Gambacorti is a Gothic-style former aristocratic palace, located in Lungarno Gambacorti #1 corner with Piazza XX Settembre, near the spot the Ponte the Mezzo crosses over to the South bank of the Arno, in the historic center of Pisa, region of Tuscany, Italy. It is connected through the second floor of the white marble Loggia di Banchi, once the town archive. The palace now houses the Pisan city council meetings in the Sala delle Baleari.

== History and description ==
A palace at the site was likely erected in the mid 11th century, along with a defensive tower to the south. The river facing facade we see today was commissioned between 1370 and 1392 by Pietro Gambacorti, a wealthy merchant; the design is attributed to Tommaso Pisano, son of Andrea Pisano. In the 1400s, after Pisa fell to the Florentines, the palace took over various government functions from customs to home of the priors. In 1533, it became property of the Tignoso family, who enlarged the palace. In 1698, with the new Grand-Ducal rule under the Lorraine, the palace housed the Magistrates. During the 19th-century, it housed the Archives of State in Pisa and barracks. From 2012 to 2015 the Sala Rossa and the Sala delle Baleari, were restored as well as their frescoes.

The Gothic facade has multichrom stone blocks. The mullioned windows, four on the ground floor and five in the floors above overlook the bank of the Arno. The south facade of via Toselli was erected in the 17th-century and above the portal is a crown with a shield honoring the Medici. An inscription recalls the capture of Pisa by Florence in 1509.

There are three grand halls of the palace, the Sala Rossa (Red Hall), so named for the red wall-paper has a ceiling fresco depicting Pisa honoring San Ranieri painted by Giuseppe and Francesco Melani. The Sala delle Baleari (Hall of the Balearics) is the largest and the ceiling is frescoed with the maritime victories by the Pisans, including a crusade in 1113 against the Muslim forces occupying the Balearic Islands and the 1258 assault of Cagliari in Sardinia. These scenes were completed in 1693 by Giacomo Farelli. The central fresco shows the role of Pisans in the siege and capture of Jerusalem in 1099; this was completed by Cesare Dandini in 1695. The Sala degli Stemmi, decorated with the heraldic shield of prominent Pisan families, is presently used to officiate civil weddings.
