= Corso Italia (Milan) =

Corso Italia is a centrally located boulevard in Milan, stretching from the historic city center near Piazza del Duomo down toward the southern districts. It is known for its blend of historic 20th-century architecture, modern business hubs, and upscale residences.

The avenue is the site of the Corso Italia Complex, a post-war architectural masterpiece designed by Luigi Moretti, which features "double towers" and blade-shaped buildings.
