= Santa Apollonia, Pisa =

Church in Pisa, Italy

Coordinates: 43°43′11.55″N 11°24′5.73″E

Church of Santa Apollonia
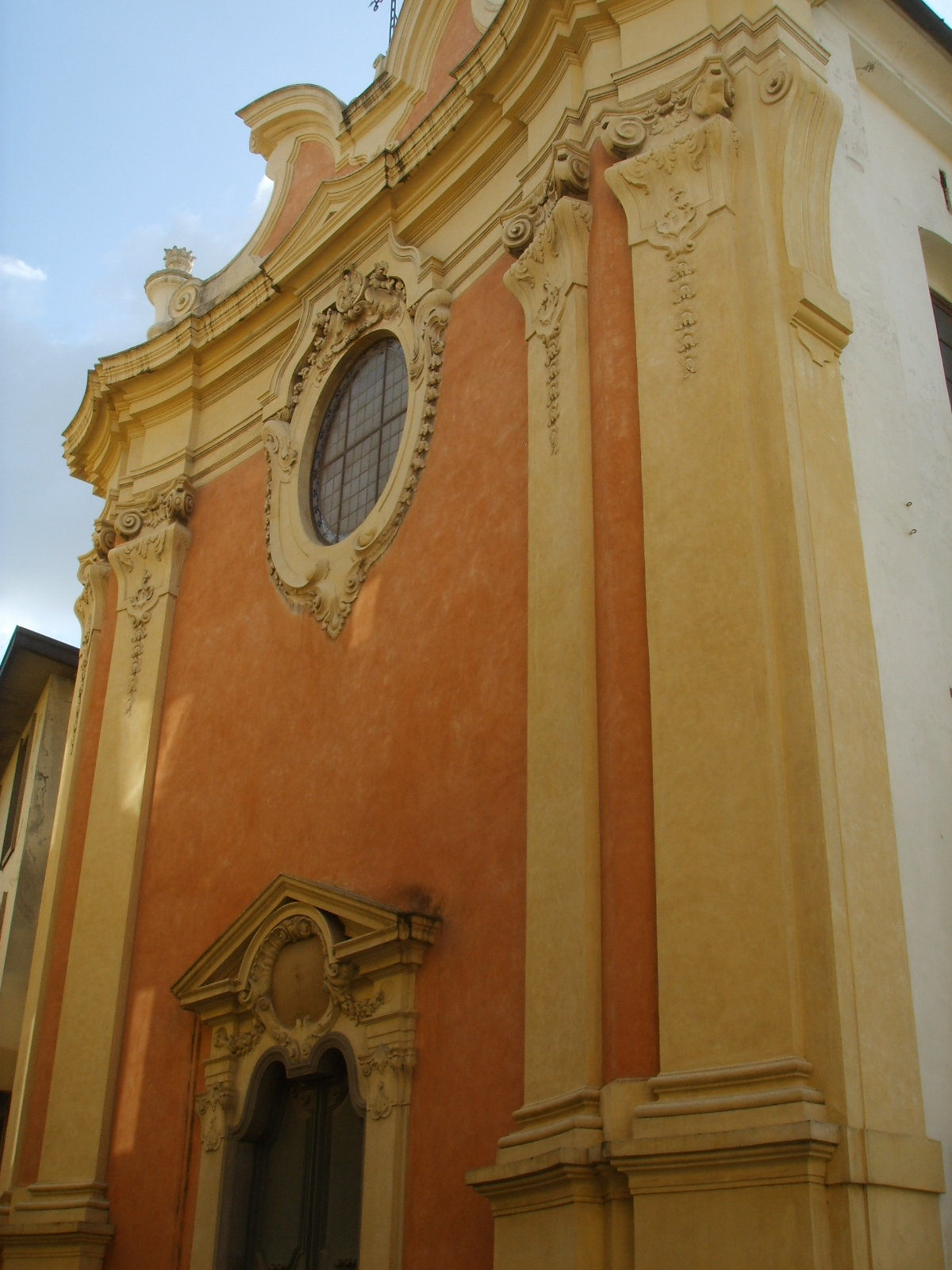

- Location within Italy

Religion
- Affiliation: Roman Catholic
- Province: Pisa

Location
- Location: Pisa, Italy

Architecture
- Architect: Mattia Tarocchi
- Type: Church
- Style: Baroque
- Groundbreaking: before 1116
- Completed: 1777

Santa Apollonia is a church in Pisa, Italy.

Once called San Pietro a Schia, this church is known from documents from 1116, and a reconstruction in 1277. In 1777, the Pisan architect Mattia Tarocchi reconstructed the church in Baroque style. The interior houses the altar and stucco and mural decorations by Tarocchi, and paintings by Aurelio Lomi, Pandolfo Titi, and the 19th-century painter Giuseppe Bacchini.

== Sources ==
- Barsali, U.; U. Castelli; R. Gagetti; O. Parra (1999). Storia e Capolavori di Pisa. Florence: Bonechi.
- Donati, Roberto. Pisa. Arte e storia. Narni: Plurigraf.
