= San Pietro in Vinculis, Pisa =

Church in Pisa

Coordinates: 43°42′58.49″N 10°24′12.75″E

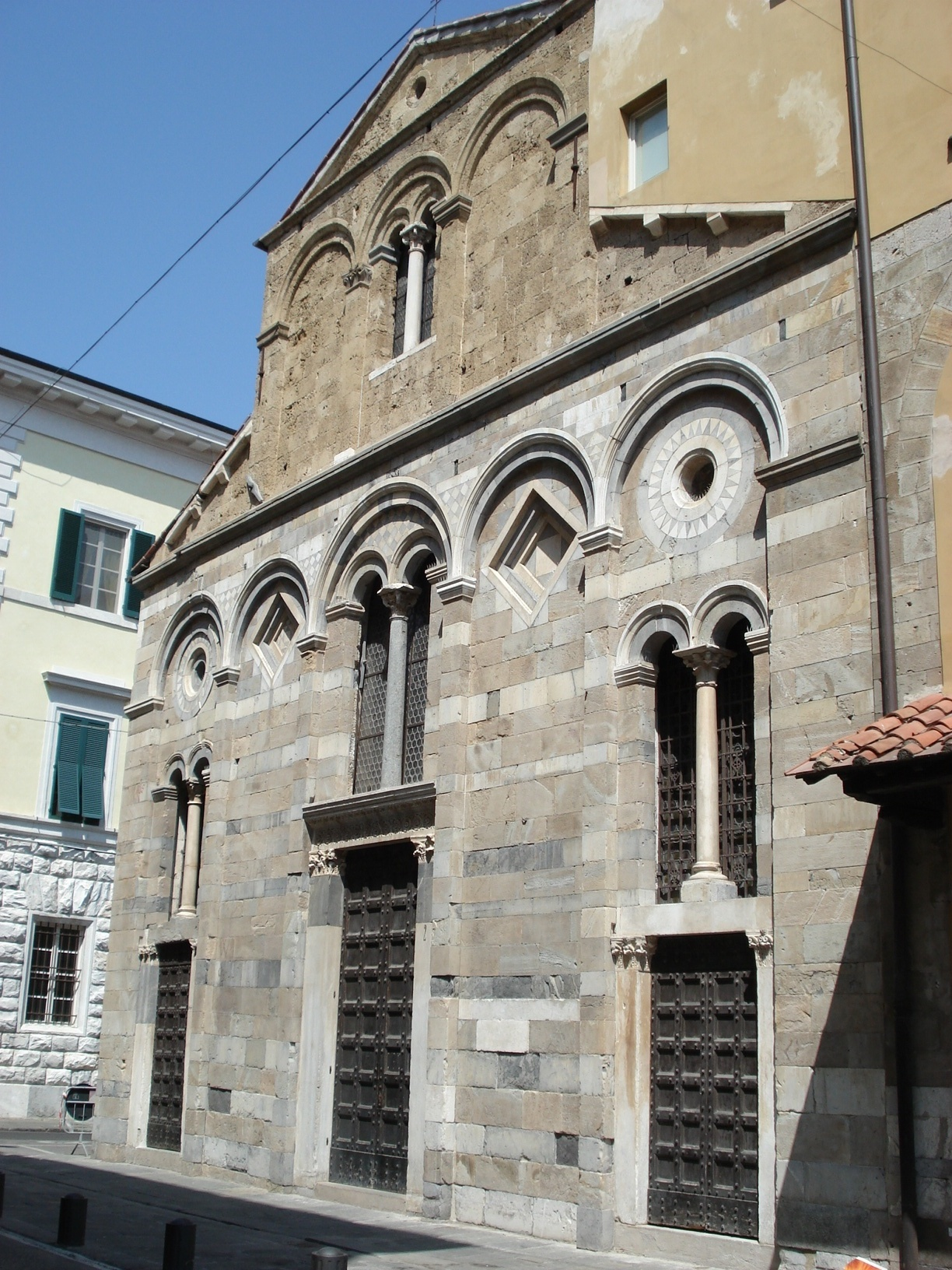
Façade.

San Pietro in Vinculis is a Romanesque-style, Roman Catholic church in Pisa, region of Tuscany, Italy.

== History ==
It was built by the Augustinians in 1072-1118 over a pre-existing edifice. The rectory was added a few years later.

The structure follows the Pisan Romanesque style established by Buscheto. It has a nave and two aisles with apses. The façade is articulated by pilaster strips, blind arches, oculi (small circular windows), lozenges and mullioned windows.

In the interior the intarsia pavement lies over a crypt with groin vaults and Roman capitals, perhaps the relic of an ancient market loggia later turned into a Christian temple. It houses a Roman sarcophagus, remains of frescoes and a Crucifix on panel from the 13th century. In the rectory are frescoes from the 13th and 15th centuries and 18th century stuccoes. The bell tower was in origin a civil tower (late 11th-early 12th century).

For years, the church kept a famous manuscript containing a digest of the Corpus Juris Civilis of Emperor Justinian I of the Eastern Roman Empire. The document had fallen into Pisan hands after the sack of Amalfi in 1137. After Pisa fell in 1406, the Florence the document was transferred to the latter city.
