= Giovanni Pietro Gnocchi =

Italian painter

Giovanni Pietro Gnocchi was an Italian painter, active during the late 16th century in Lombardy in a late-Renaissance or Mannerist styles.

== Biography ==
He was born in Milan, and a pupil of Aurelio Luini. His altarpiece depicting the Madonna and child with Saints Margherita d'Antiochia, Sant'Ambrogio (?), San Domenico, Santa Liberata e Santa Faustina is in the Museo Civici of Como. He was active in Como in 1577–1579.
