= Baccio Lomi =

Italian painter

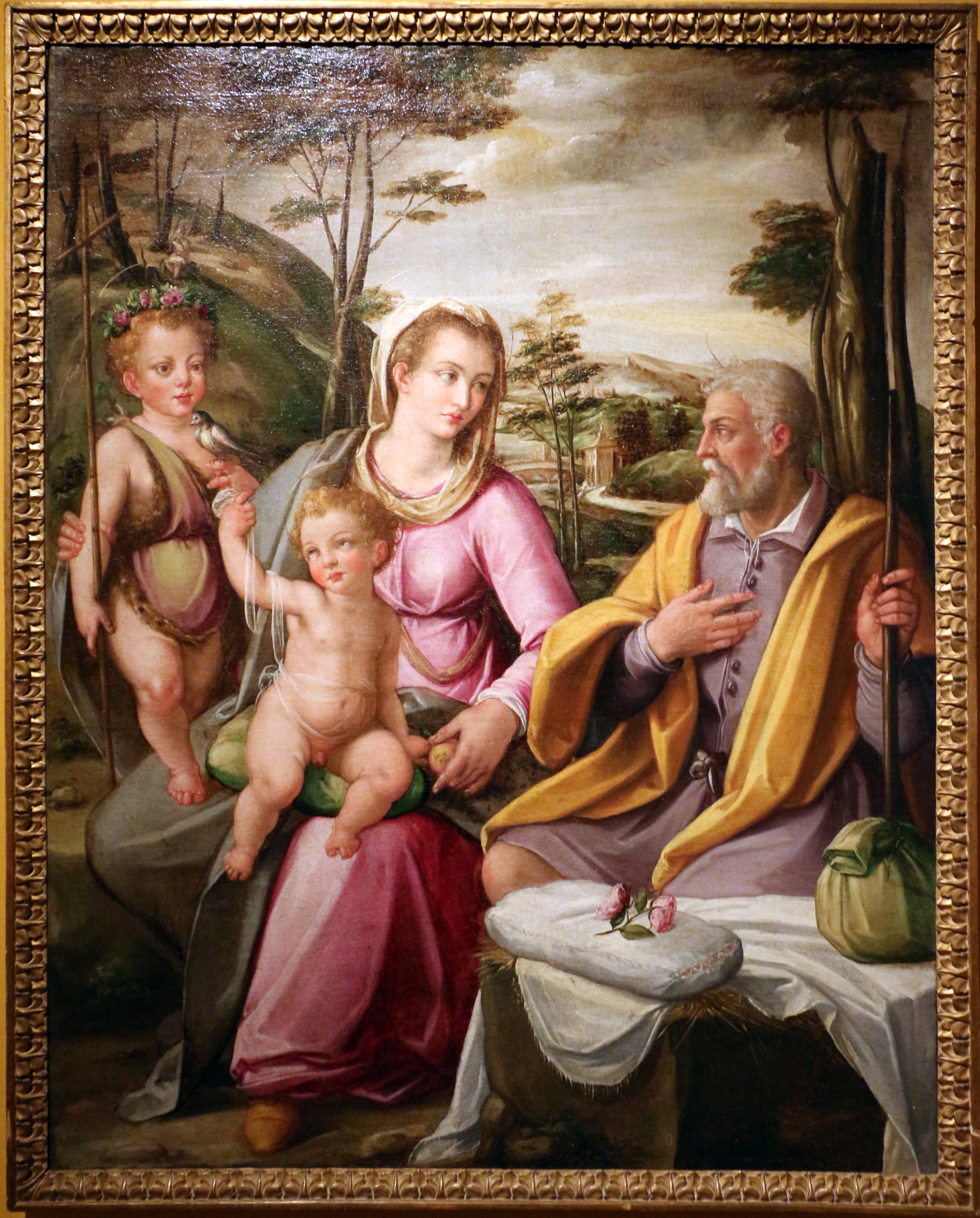
Holy Family with Saint John the Baptist, Palazzo Blu, Pisa

Baccio Lomi (circa 1550–1595) was an Italian painter of the late-Renaissance period, active mainly in town of Pisa, in the region of Tuscany (then the Republic of Florence).

== Biography ==
He may have initially been trained by his father, Giovanni Battista Lomi, a Florentine goldsmith. He acquired Pisan citizenship in 1572. Two of his brothers, and pupils, were Orazio (born 1562) and Aurelio Lomi (born 1556). Baccio mainly painted religious altarpieces and portraits.
