= Cesare Studiati (politician) =

Italian politician (1902–1965)

Member of the Chamber of Fasces and Corporations
- In office 1941–1943

Personal details
- Born: Cesare Studiati Berni; 19 August 1902 Molina di Quosa, Province of Pisa, Kingdom of Italy
- Died: 1965 (aged 62–63)
- Party: National Fascist Party
- Education: University of Pisa
- Occupation: Agronomist

Cesare Studiati Berni (19 August 1902 – 1965) was an Italian agronomist and fascist politician, who served as a member of the Chamber of Fasces and Corporations.

== Life and career ==
Cesare was the son of Pietro Studiati Berni, an architect and engineer, and belonged to a wealthy family of physicians and landowners from Pisa. He was named after his paternal grandfather, the physiologist Cesare. Studiati obtained a degree in Agricultural sciences from the University of Pisa.

He took part in World War II, and in 1936 he was appointed second lieutenant in the reserve of the 81st Infantry Regiment stationed in Cyrenaica.

An agronomist and entrepreneur in olive oil and wine production, he held numerous positions and institutional roles within Fascist agricultural syndicates. In 1941, he became a full member of the Corporation of Textile Products and later a member of the corporation's consultative committee, representing agricultural workers, replacing Gino Rojatti by decree of Benito Mussolini dated 29 January 1942. He served as a representative of the Fascist Confederation of Agricultural Workers on the Board of the Trade Union School in Florence. He also served as a member of the Chamber of Fasces and Corporations from 1941 to 1943.

Studiati died suddenly in 1965, leaving the management of the family agricultural estate in Molina di Quosa to his son Piero (1936–2014).
