= Bombing of Pisa in World War II =

Bombing of Pisa
- Part of Strategic bombing during World War II
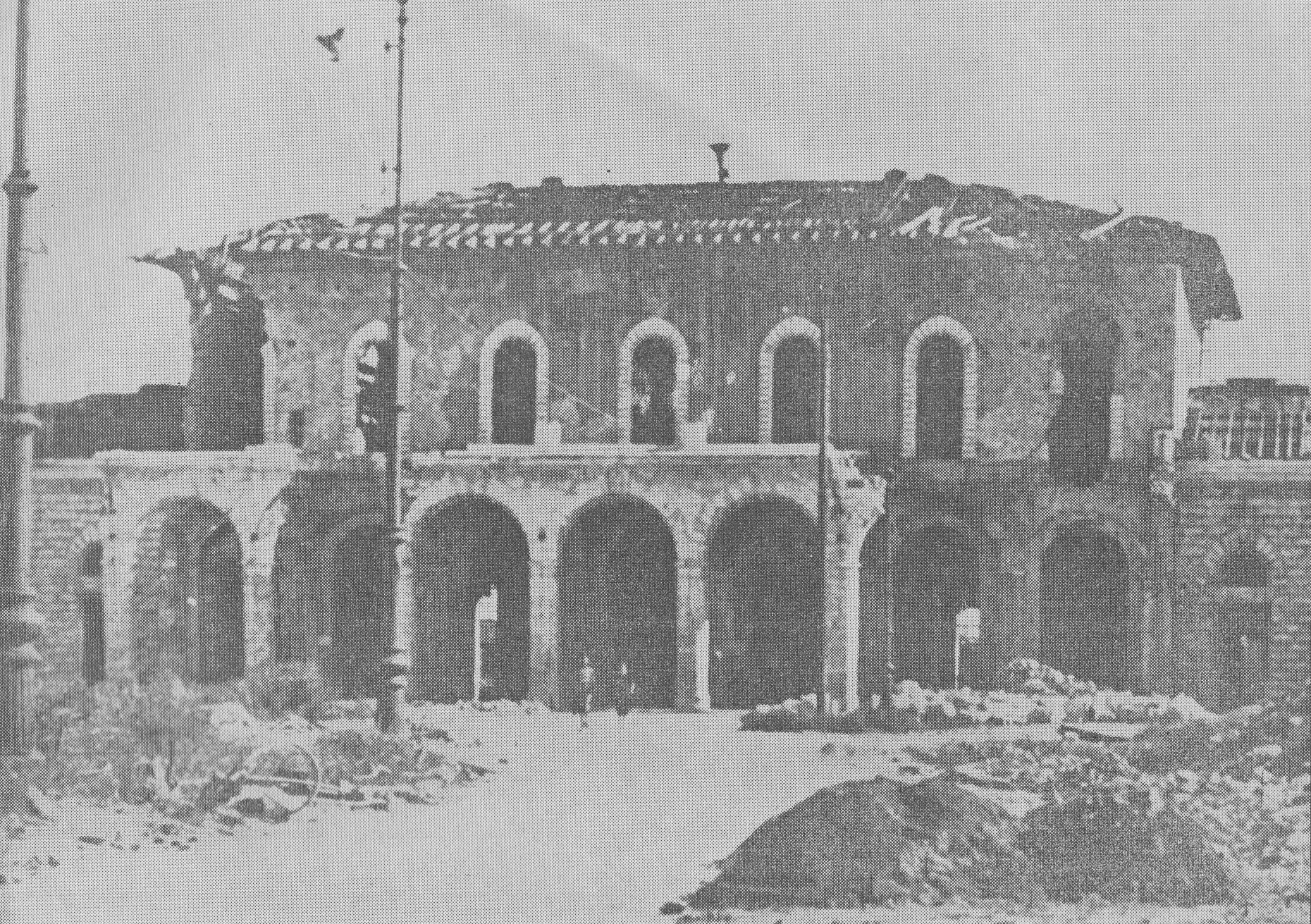
- The Pisa Centrale railway station, main target of the attack, after the raid
Date	31 August 1943
Location	Pisa, Tuscany, Italy
Result	Target hit; extensive destruction and civilian casualties

Belligerents
United States USAAF	Fascist Italy

Casualties and losses
4 bombers	952 civilians

The bombing of Pisa took place on 31 August 1943, during World War II. Aimed at disabling the city's marshalling yard, it also resulted in heavy damage to the city itself (although its most famous landmarks were left untouched) and civilian casualties.

== History ==
The Pisa Centrale railway station was considered by the Allies to be of strategic importance for railway communications in central Italy, as it was the intersection point between the Turin-Genoa-Rome-Naples railway line and the Livorno-Florence railway line; this led to several Allied air raids aimed at its destruction. Additionally, the district of Porta a Mare housed several factories engaged in war production, and the nearby San Giusto airfield was a base for the Regia Aeronautica.

The first and heaviest raid took place on 31 August 1943, when 152 Boeing B-17 Flying Fortress and Consolidated B-24 Liberator of the United States Army Air Force, having taken off from airfields in Tunisia, dropped 408 tons of bombs on the Porta a Mare district, where the railway station was located. This raid was also part of the intensified Allied bombing campaign over Italy after the fall of Benito Mussolini on 25 July 1943, aimed at pushing the new Badoglio government to surrender. The raid began at 13:01, during lunchtime, and lasted seven minutes. The air raid sirens had been sounded at noon, but owing to a number of false alarms during the previous months, a large part of the population did not go to air raid shelters, believing this to be yet another false alarm; this contributed to the high death toll.

At 13:01, the first bombers started dropping their bombs over the Porta a Mare power station. 367 bombs were dropped on the Saint-Gobain factory, killing 56 workers while they were at lunch. Italian 90 mm and German 88 mm anti-aircraft guns opened fire, and Macchi C.200 fighter planes took off from the nearby Arena Metato airfield, but were unable to seriously interfere with the raid; only four of the 152 B-17s and B-24s were shot down.

The railway station, the objective of the raid, was hit and badly damaged; at the same time, however, the entire part of Pisa located south of the Arno river suffered heavy damage, with the Porta a Mare district being virtually razed to the ground. 2,500 homes were destroyed or damaged, and several historical buildings were also hit, such as the Palazzo Pretorio and the churches of San Paolo a Ripa d'Arno and Sant'Antonio Abate. At least 952 inhabitants of Pisa were killed, according to the official figures; other estimates claim that the death toll was higher, up to 2,500 victims.

== Further raids ==
After this attack, Pisa suffered further heavy raids by both the USAAF and the Royal Air Force on 23, 24 and 25 September, 4 October and 25 December 1943, and on 18 and 19 January and 14 February 1944. All these raids were aimed at either the airfield or the marshalling yard, but caused further damage and casualties to the city as well. In the summer of 1944 Pisa also suffered heavy artillery shelling by the advancing Allied forces.

By the time the Allies liberated Pisa, on 2 September 1944, 48% of all homes in the city had been destroyed; most of the damage was concentrated in the districts south of the Arno, where few buildings had escaped damage. Civilian deaths from air raids and shelling were 1,738.

The city's most famous landmarks – the Cathedral, the Leaning Tower and the Baptistery – had survived unscathed. Still, the Camposanto Monumentale, after being spared by the air raids, was hit by artillery shelling, with the loss of many of its frescoes. Many other less famous churches and historic palaces suffered damage, although this was repairable in most cases.

== Bibliography ==
- Paolo Gianfaldoni, Pisa dal bombardamento del 1943 sino ai giorni nostri, Felici, 1993
- Elena Ferrara, Enrico Stampacchia, Il bombardamento di Pisa del 31 agosto 1943. Dalle testimonianze alla memoria storica, Tagete, 2004
- Marco Gioannini, Giulio Massobrio, Bombardate l’Italia. Storia della guerra di distruzione aerea 1940-1945, Rizzoli, 2007
