= Pietro Studiati Berni =

Pietro Studiati Berni may refer to:

- Pietro Studiati Berni (architect)
- Pietro Studiati Berni (physician)
