= Maurizio Donte =

Italian poet and sonnetist

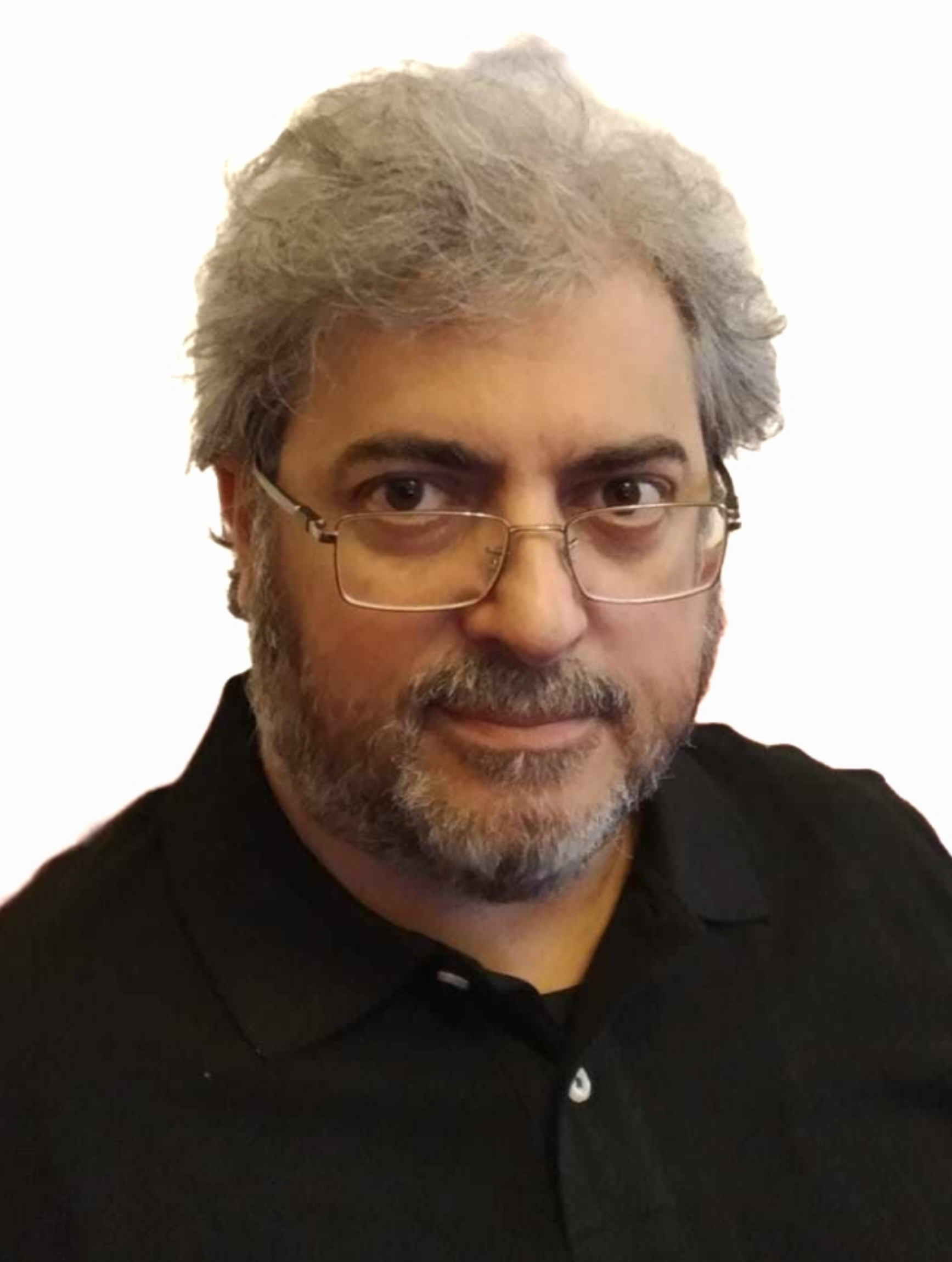
Maurizio Donte

Maurizio Donte (born in Imperia, Porto Maurizio, on 29 December 1962) is an Italian poet and sonnetist. He lives in Pornassio, Imperia, Liguria, Italy. Donte is the author of several poetry books and fiction appreciated in Italy and abroad. He has won numerous literary prizes and is quite often called to judge prestigious literary competitions.

== Biography ==
He studied classical metrics at the Accademia Alfieri di Firenze. The academy was founded by Dalmazio Masini, with the masters: Vittorio Verducci, Lorena Turri and Alfonso Vincenzo Mauro and during 2024 he was invited to become a full member of the same Academy. In the years 2016-2017 Donte was an artistic director and in 2018 he was president of the jury at the competition: Parasio International, city of Imperia. In the years 2017-2022 he was president of the jury at the San Valentino competition, city of Ormea. Since 2016 he has collaborated with professor Nazario Pardini on the literary blog "Alle volte di Leucade". His poems are translated into English by the famous poet and watercolorist Peter Weevers, and into Polish by the poet Izabella Teresa Kostka. He has received numerous reviews and certificates from critics and contemporary, literary writers such as Umberto Vicaretti, Nazario Pardini, Giangiacomo Amoretti, Vittorio Verducci, Lorena Turri, Marisa Cossu, Edda Conte, Ninnij di Stefano Busà, Patrizia Stefanelli, Lidia Guerrieri, Maria Rizzi, Gianluca Jurij Posteraro, Orazio Antonio Bologna, Pasquale Balestriere, Lorenzo Curti, Luciano Domenighini, Rodolfo Vettorello, Mario De Rosa, Antonio Spagnuolo and many others. Donte works as a chemical expert and biomedical laboratory technician.

== Publications ==
- Commentarii de Re Publica, REI, 2011, ISBN 88-97362-64-8
- De Bello Parthico, REI, 2012, ISBN 978-88-97362-67-8
- Sonetti e Madrigali di amore e guerra, REI, 2014, ISBN 978-88-275-9207-6
- Cù Chulainn. Il mito del mastino di Cullan, REI, 2014, ISBN 978-2-37297-124-9
- I nuovi canti di Erin, REI, 2014 ISBN 978-88-909176-5-3
- Nell’incanto (eBook) silloge poetica, Esordienti, 2016, ISBN 978-88-6690-295-9
- Il canzoniere. Rerum vulgarium fragmenta II. Vol. 1, Vetri, 2017, ISBN 978-88-99782-21-4
- Il canzoniere. Rerum vulgarium fragmenta II. Vol. 2, Vetri, 2018, ISBN 978-88-99782-38-2
- Il crepuscolo degli dèi Götterdämmerung – Beowulf, Vetri, 2019, ISBN 978-88-99782-52-8
- Il canzoniere. Rerum vulgarium fragmenta II. Vol. 3, Vetri, 2020, ISBN 978-88-99782-58-0
- Rime extravaganti Vol.1, Vetri, 2021, ISBN 978-88-99782-81-8
- L'arte del sonetto, Vetri, 2023, ISBN 979-12-81306-17-2
- Trasposizioni metriche di sonetti scelti di William Shakespeare, Vetri, 2024, ISBN 9791281306257
