= Turino Vanni =

Italian painter

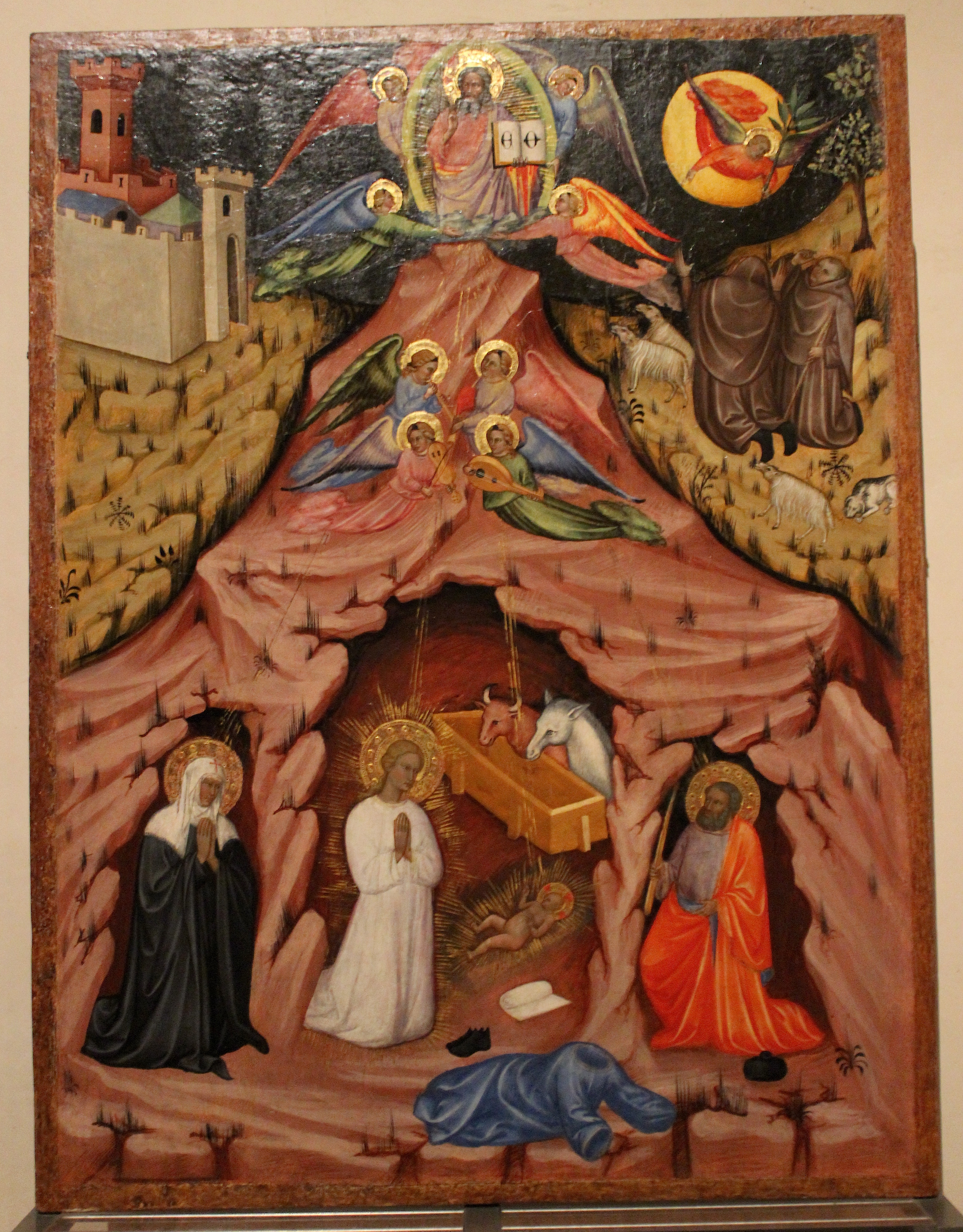
Nativity

Turino Vanni (late 14th century) was an Italian painter.

== Biography ==
He was born at Rigoli, a small village near Pisa.

== Works ==
He was an imitator of Taddeo Bartoli.

- The records show that he worked for the Duomo of Pisa between 1390 and 1395.
- In the church of San Paolo Ripo d'Arno Pisa, is an enthroned Virgin and Child with saints, and adored by four kneeling figures, signed TORINUS VANNIS DE REGULI DEPINXIT A.D. MCCCXCVII.
- He has also left in a convent of Palermo, a S. Madonna with angels and a signed Madonna is found in the Louvre.

== Relationships ==
He is identified as the uncle of Nero and Bernado di Nello (Nello di Vanni), a painter circa 1390, said to be a pupil of Orcagna.
