= Patrignone, San Giuliano Terme =

Patrignone
- Frazione
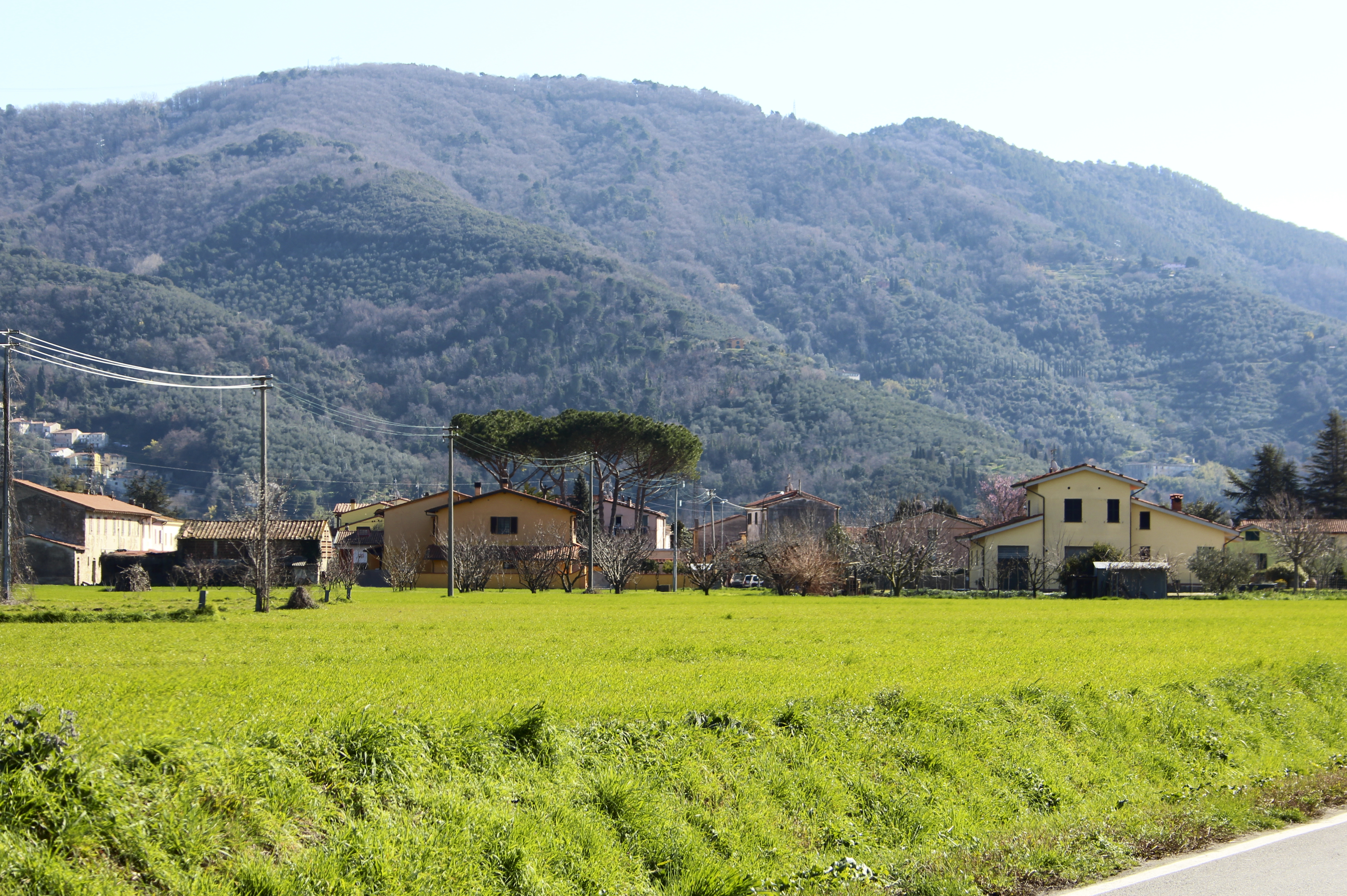

- Location of Patrignone in Italy
- Coordinates: 43°47′54″N 10°24′32″E
- Country: Italy
- Region: Tuscany
- Province: Pisa (PI)
- Comune: San Giuliano Terme
- Elevation: 7 m (23 ft)

Population (2011)
  - Total: 160
- Time zone: UTC+1 (CET)
  - Summer (DST): UTC+2 (CEST)
- Postal code: 56017
- Dialing code: (+39) 050

Patrignone is a village in Tuscany, central Italy, administratively a frazione of the comune of San Giuliano Terme, province of Pisa. At the time of the 2001 census its population was 160.

Patrignone is about 10 km from Pisa and 6 km from San Giuliano Terme.
