= San Martino a Ulmiano =

- Frazione
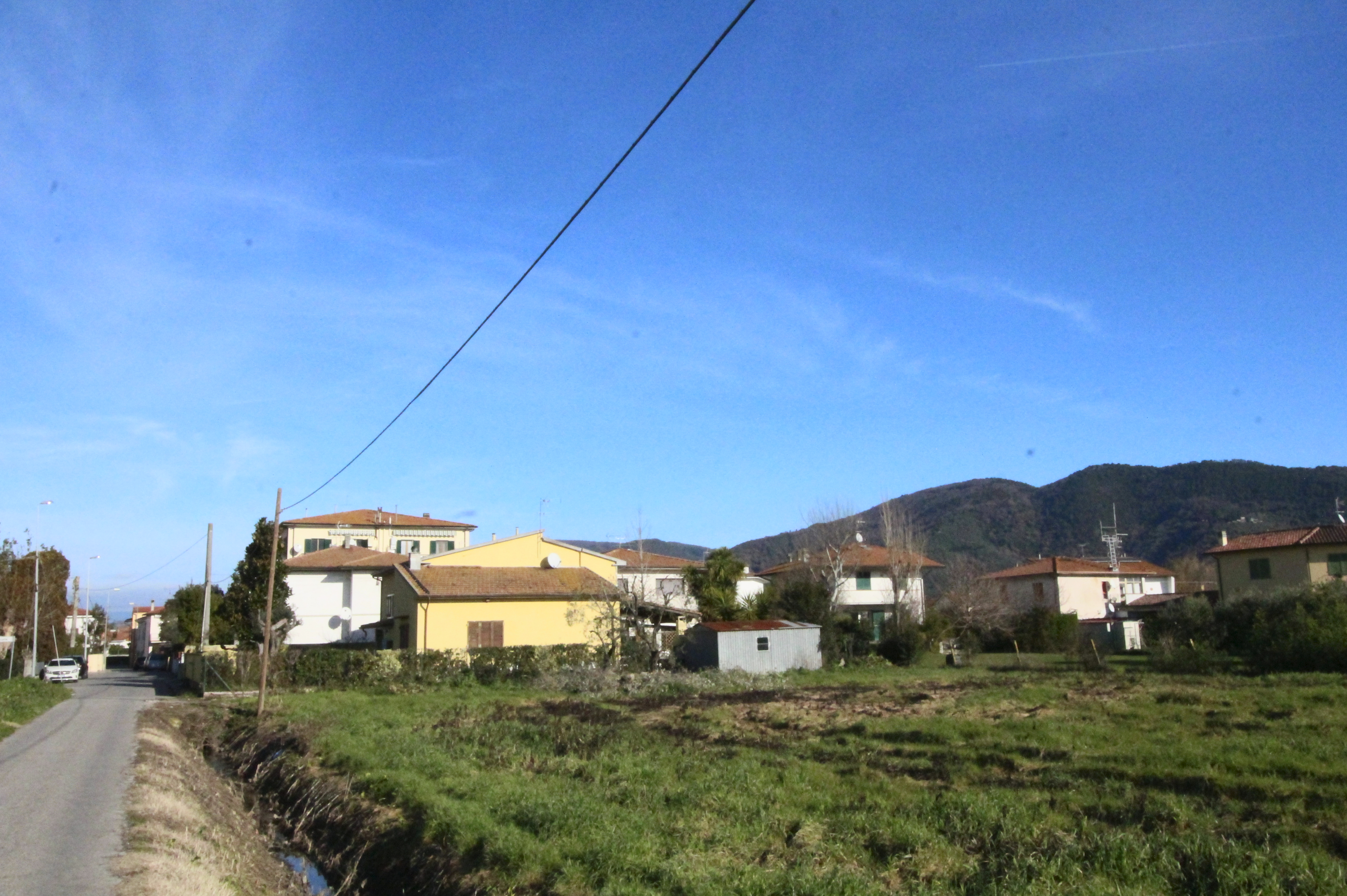

- Location of San Martino a Ulmiano in Italy
- Coordinates: 43°46′22″N 10°24′21″E
- Country: Italy
- Region: Tuscany
- Province: Pisa (PI)
- Comune: San Giuliano Terme
- Elevation: 3 m (9.8 ft)

Population
  - Total: 2,000
- Demonym: Sammartinesi
- Time zone: UTC+1 (CET)
  - Summer (DST): UTC+2 (CEST)
- Postal code: 56017
- Dialing code: (+39) 050

San Martino a Ulmiano is a village in Tuscany, central Italy, administratively a frazione of the comune of San Giuliano Terme, province of Pisa.

San Martino a Ulmiano is about 6 km from Pisa and 4 km from San Giuliano Terme.

== Bibliography ==
- Caciagli, Giuseppe (1972). Pisa e la sua provincia. Vol. 3. Pisa: Colombo Cursi Editore.
