= Asciano Pisano =

- Frazione
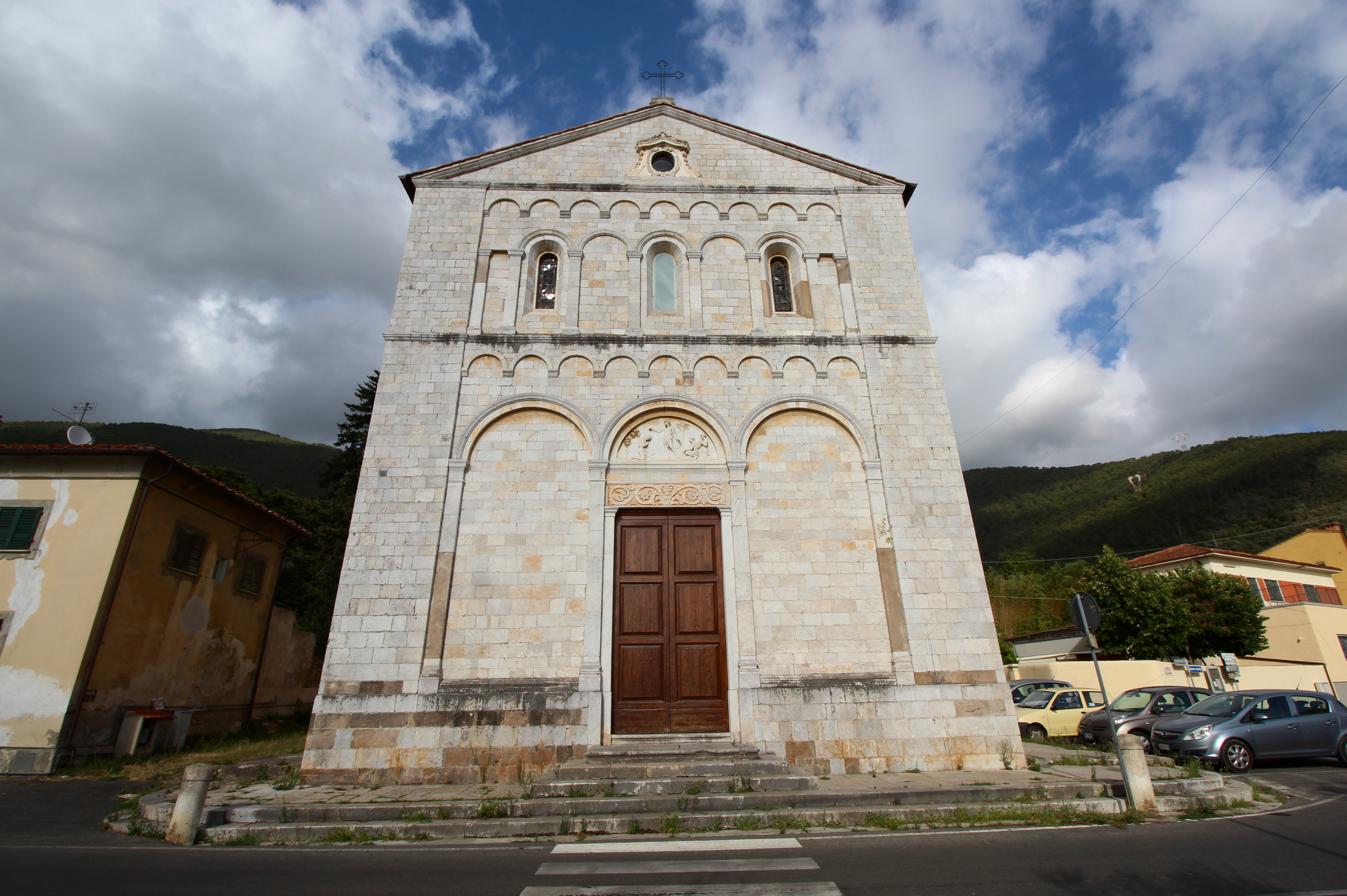
- The church of San Giovanni Battista

- Location of Asciano Pisano in Italy
- Coordinates: 43°44′59″N 10°28′5″E
- Country: Italy
- Region: Tuscany
- Province: Pisa (PI)
- Comune: San Giuliano Terme
- Elevation: 23 m (75 ft)

Population (2011)
  - Total: 2,363
- Demonym: Ascianesi
- Time zone: UTC+1 (CET)
  - Summer (DST): UTC+2 (CEST)
- Postal code: 56017
- Dialing code: (+39) 050

Asciano Pisano is a village in Tuscany, central Italy, administratively a frazione of the comune of San Giuliano Terme, province of Pisa. At the time of the 2001 census its population was 2,302.

Asciano Pisano is about 7 km (4.3 mi) from Pisa and 3 km (1.9 mi) from San Giuliano Terme.
