= Pontasserchio =

- Frazione
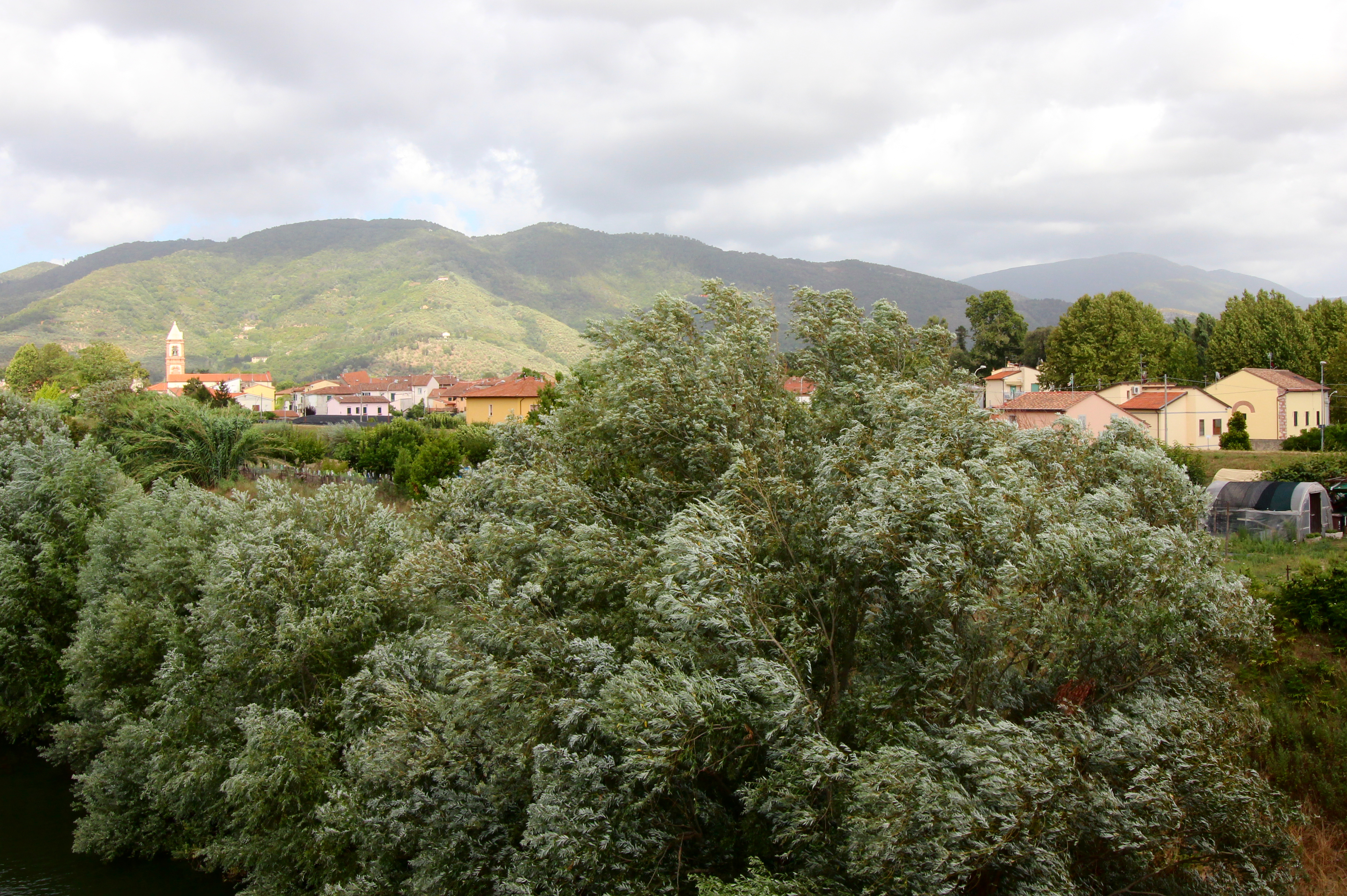

- Location of Pontasserchio in Italy
- Coordinates: 43°46′51″N 10°24′11″E
- Country: Italy
- Region: Tuscany
- Province: Pisa (PI)
- Comune: San Giuliano Terme
- Elevation: 6 m (20 ft)

Population (2011)
  - Total: 6,132
- Demonym(s): Pontasserchiesi, Pontigiani
- Time zone: UTC+1 (CET)
  - Summer (DST): UTC+2 (CEST)
- Postal code: 56017
- Dialing code: (+39) 050

Pontasserchio is a town in Tuscany, central Italy, administratively a frazione of the comune of San Giuliano Terme, province of Pisa. At the time of the 2001 census its population was 3,434.

Pontasserchio is about 7 km from Pisa and 4 km from San Giuliano Terme.
