= San Giuliano Terme =

San Giuliano Terme Bagni di San Giuliano
- Comune
- Comune di San Giuliano Terme
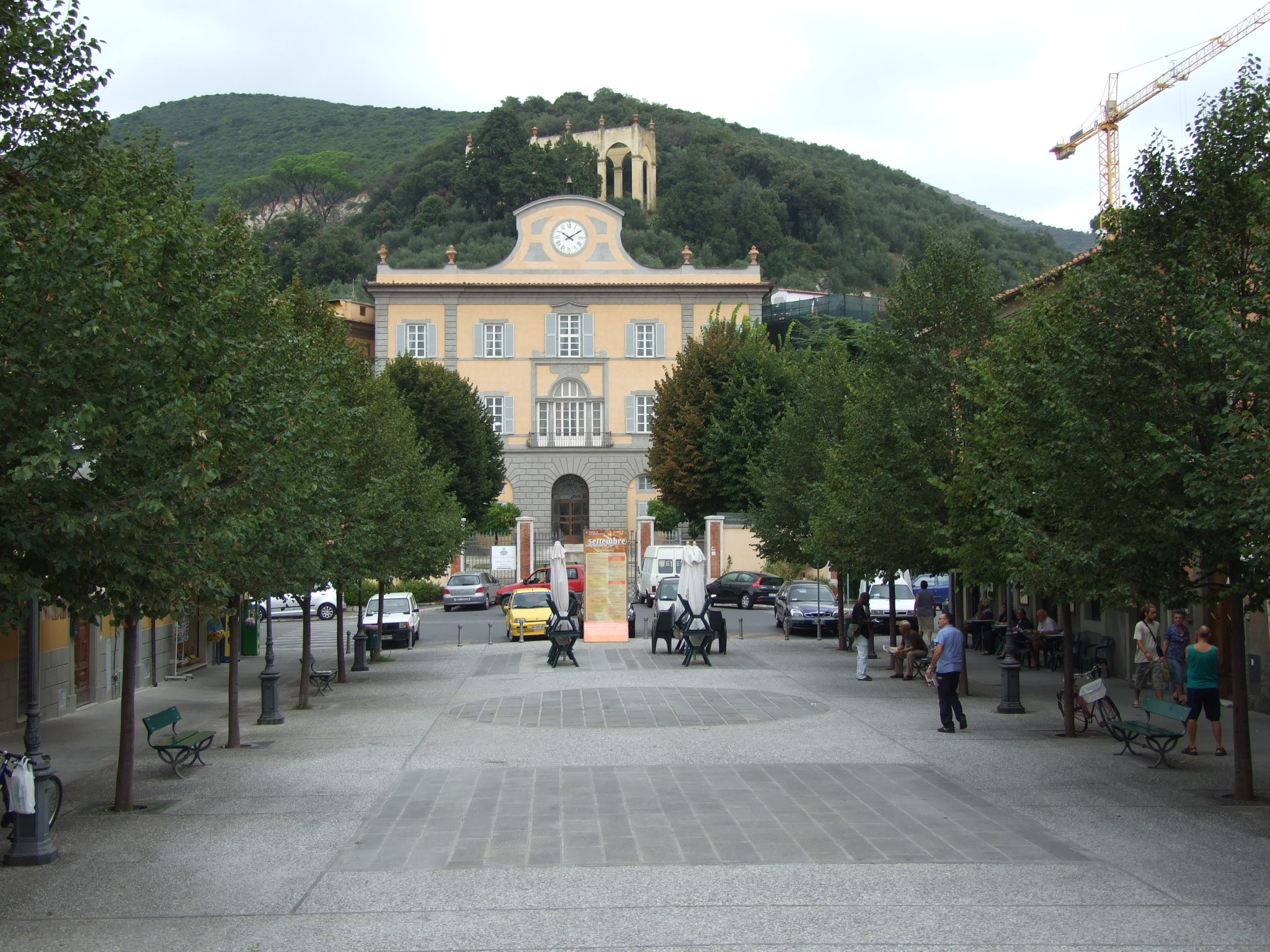

- Location within Italy Location within Tuscany
- Coordinates: 43°45′40″N 10°26′25″E
- Country: Italy
- Region: Tuscany
- Province: Pisa (PI)
- Frazioni: Agnano, Arena Metato, Asciano Pisano, Campo, Colignola, Colognole, Gello, Ghezzano, Madonna dell'Acqua, Mezzana, Molina di Quosa, Orzignano, Pappiana, Patrignone, Pontasserchio, Pugnano, Rigoli, Ripafratta, San Martino a Ulmiano, Sant'Andrea in Pescaiola

Government
  - Mayor: Sergio Di Maio

Area
  - Total: 91.77 km^{2} (35.43 sq mi)
- Elevation: 6 m (20 ft)

Population (1 January 2016)
  - Total: 21,399
  - Density: 233.2/km^{2} (603.9/sq mi)
- Demonym: Sangiulianesi
- Time zone: UTC+1 (CET)
  - Summer (DST): UTC+2 (CEST)
- Postal code: 56017
- Dialing code: 050
- Patron saint: St. Bartholomew the Apostle
- Saint day: 24 August
- Website: Official website

San Giuliano Terme is a comune (municipality) in the Province of Pisa in the Italian region Tuscany, located about 80 kilometres (50 mi) west of Florence and about 5 kilometres (3 mi) northeast of Pisa.

== Main sights ==
The area of the Pisa hills was already an attraction for enlightened travellers in the early 18th century with the growth of the thermal spa of San Giuliano, just like those narrated by Carlo Goldoni and which we can continue to enjoy today. Among the prominent houses in the region are:

- Villa di Agnano
- Villa Le Molina
- Villa Roncioni
- Villa Tadini Buoninsegni
- Villa Alta
- Villa di Corliano. It houses frescoes painted by Andrea Boscoli from 1592.
- Bagni di Pisa - San Giuliano Terme, thermal hot spring

== Notable people ==
- Alberto Batistoni, football player
- Massimo Barbuti, football player
- Massimo Carmassi, architect
- Diego Fabbrini, football player
- Francesco Morini, football player
- Leo Pardi, zoologist and ethologist

== Twin towns ==
- Bad Tölz, Germany, since 2003
