= Pietro Studiati Berni (architect) =

Italian architect and engineer (1876–1962)

- Born: 26 March 1876; Pisa, Kingdom of Italy
- Died: 1962 (aged 85–86); Pisa, Italy
- Occupations: Architect, engineer

Pietro Studiati Berni (26 March 1876 – 1962) was an Italian architect and engineer active mainly in Tuscany. He designed public buildings, hospitals, schools, villas, and urban projects, combining functional planning with decorative elements in his early works, and later focused on agricultural engineering and land reclamation.

== Life and career ==
Studiati Berni, the son of Cesare, a physiology professor, and Giuseppina Agostini della Seta, from a noble family, studied engineering in Pisa and completed his degree at the Polytechnic University of Turin (1895–1898).

He began his career in architecture around 1900, collaborating with other architects and designing a variety of buildings, including public institutions, hospitals, schools, villas, and residential blocks. In the 1920s he gradually withdrew from architectural practice and devoted himself to hydraulic engineering and land reclamation projects in his estate near Massaciuccoli, including private drainage and irrigation works. He was a member of the Accademia dei Georgofili from 1928.

His son Cesare, born in 1902, was an agronomist and politician for the National Fascist Party.

== Selected works ==
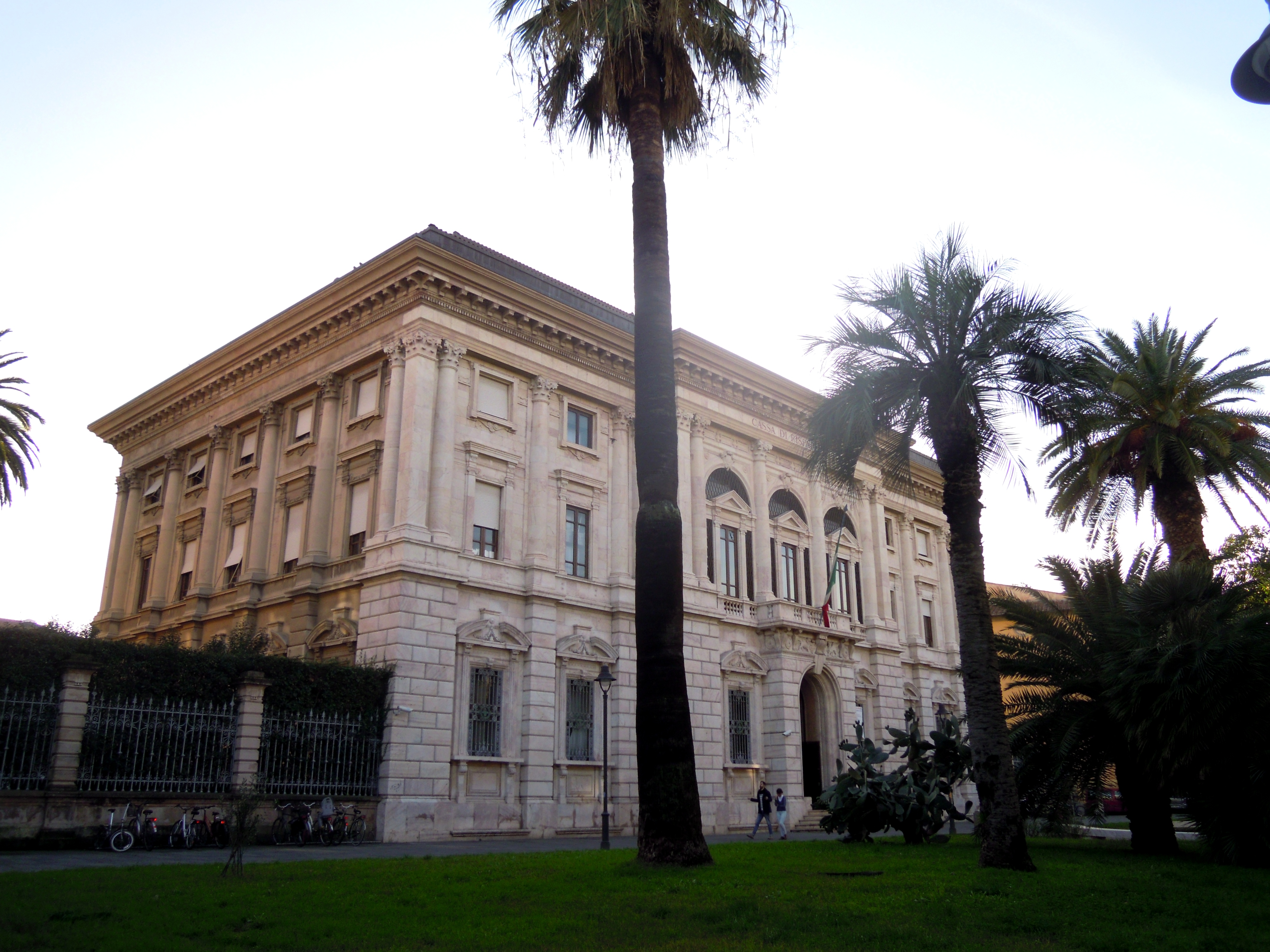
The Cassa di Risparmio headquarters in Piazza Dante, Pisa

- Chapel Schiavini Cassi, Lorenzana cemetery (1899–1900)
- Ospizio di Mendicità, Pisa (1902–1903, expansions)
- Conservatorio dei Poveri Orfani, Pisa (1903–1905)
- Villas in Marina di Pisa (1904–1907)
- Renovation of Hospital "Felice Lotti", Pontedera (1905)
- Villa Lansel, Livorno (1905–1908, destroyed)
- Villino Franco, Casciavola (1906)
- Sanatorium "Vittorio Emanuele III", Cisanello, Pisa (1907–1914)
- Casa Pardo Roques, Pisa (1909)
- Puntoni Building, Campo (1909)
- Headquarters of Cassa di Risparmio di Pisa, Piazza Dante (1911–1921)
- Various clinics in Pisa (ophthalmic, obstetric, dermatological, 1912)
- Elementary schools in Lorenzana, Orciano Pisano, Pomaia, and Santa Luce (1912)
- Cinema Lumière, Pisa (1913)
- Bridge over Serchio, Ripafratta (1914)
- Villino Tabet, Pisa (1916–1921)
- Hospital "Umberto e Margherita", Viareggio (1918)
- Residential units in Pisa (1923–1926)

== Sources ==
- Bracaloni, Federico; Dringoli, Massimo, eds. (2012). Pietro Studiati Berni: Opere e progetti. Pisa: Pacini.
- Bibolini, Maria Ida (1994). L'attività architettonica di Pietro Studiati (1876–1962). Pisa: Università degli Studi di Pisa.
- Daniele, Emilia, ed. (2010). Le dimore di Pisa: l'arte di abitare i palazzi di una antica repubblica marinara dal Medioevo all'Unità d'Italia. Florence: Alinea.
- Insabato, Elisabetta; Ghelli, Cecilia, eds. (2007). Guida agli archivi di architetti e ingegneri del Novecento in Toscana. Florence: Edifir. pp. 356–358.
