= Giovanni Chiocca =

Italian author

Giovanni Chiocca (1911 - 1960) was an Italian author of riddles, who signed his work with the pseudonym of Stelio; one of his best-known riddles is La giostra (The Carousel). Born at Gello di San Giuliano Terme, he is also remembered for his work as a writer and editor.

Chiocca died in Pisa in 1960.
