= Gello, San Giuliano Terme =

Gello
- Frazione
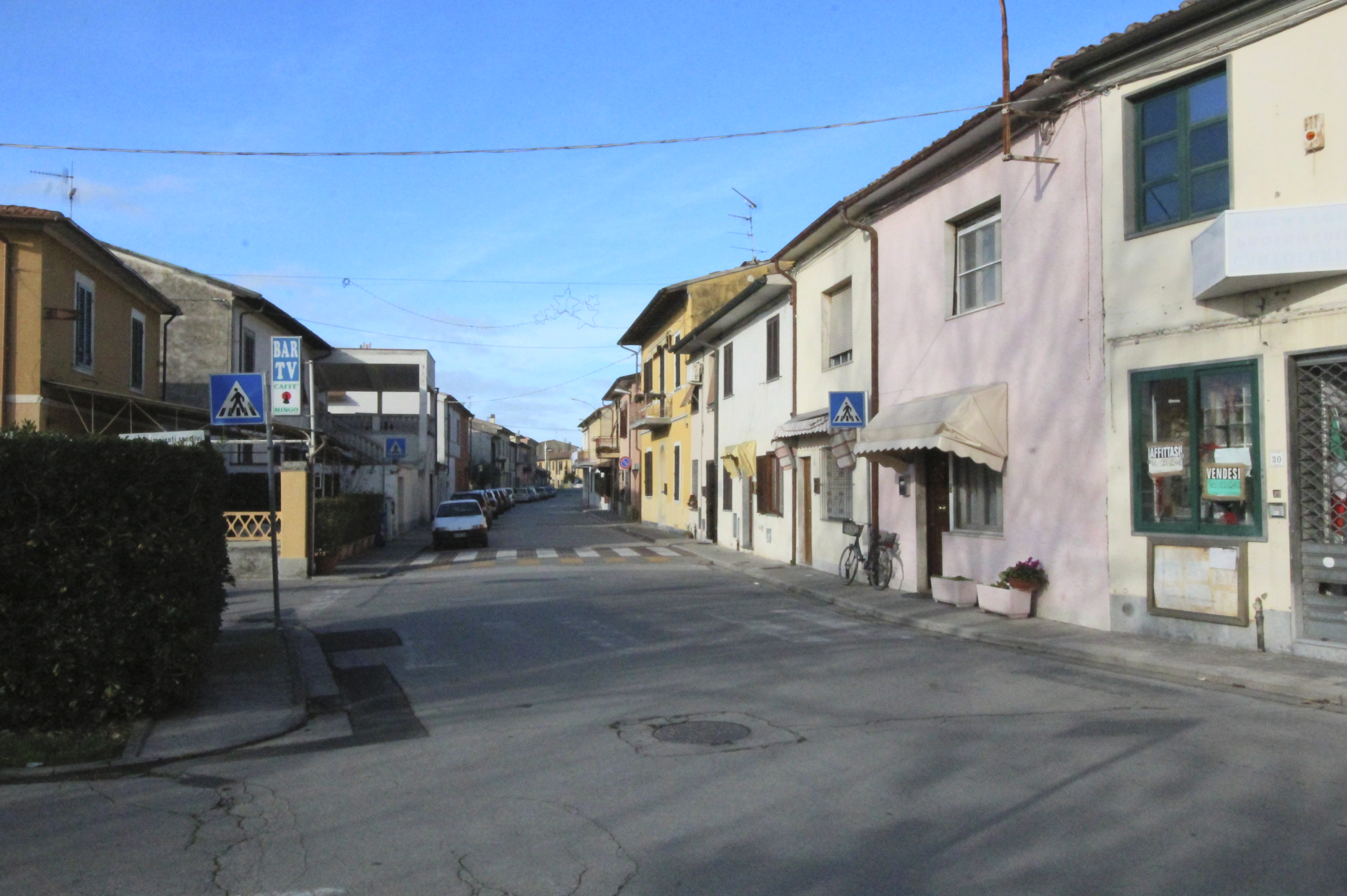

- Location of Gello in Italy
- Coordinates: 43°45′26″N 10°25′37″E
- Country: Italy
- Region: Tuscany
- Province: Pisa (PI)
- Comune: San Giuliano Terme
- Elevation: 3 m (9.8 ft)

Population (2011)
  - Total: 2,365
- Time zone: UTC+1 (CET)
  - Summer (DST): UTC+2 (CEST)
- Postal code: 56017
- Dialing code: (+39) 050

Gello is a village in Tuscany, central Italy, administratively a frazione of the comune of San Giuliano Terme, province of Pisa. At the time of the 2001 census its population was 1,830.

Gello is about 4 km from Pisa and 2 km from San Giuliano Terme.

== Notable people ==
- Giovanni Chiocca (1911–1960), writer and editor
