= Sant'Andrea in Pescaiola =

- Frazione
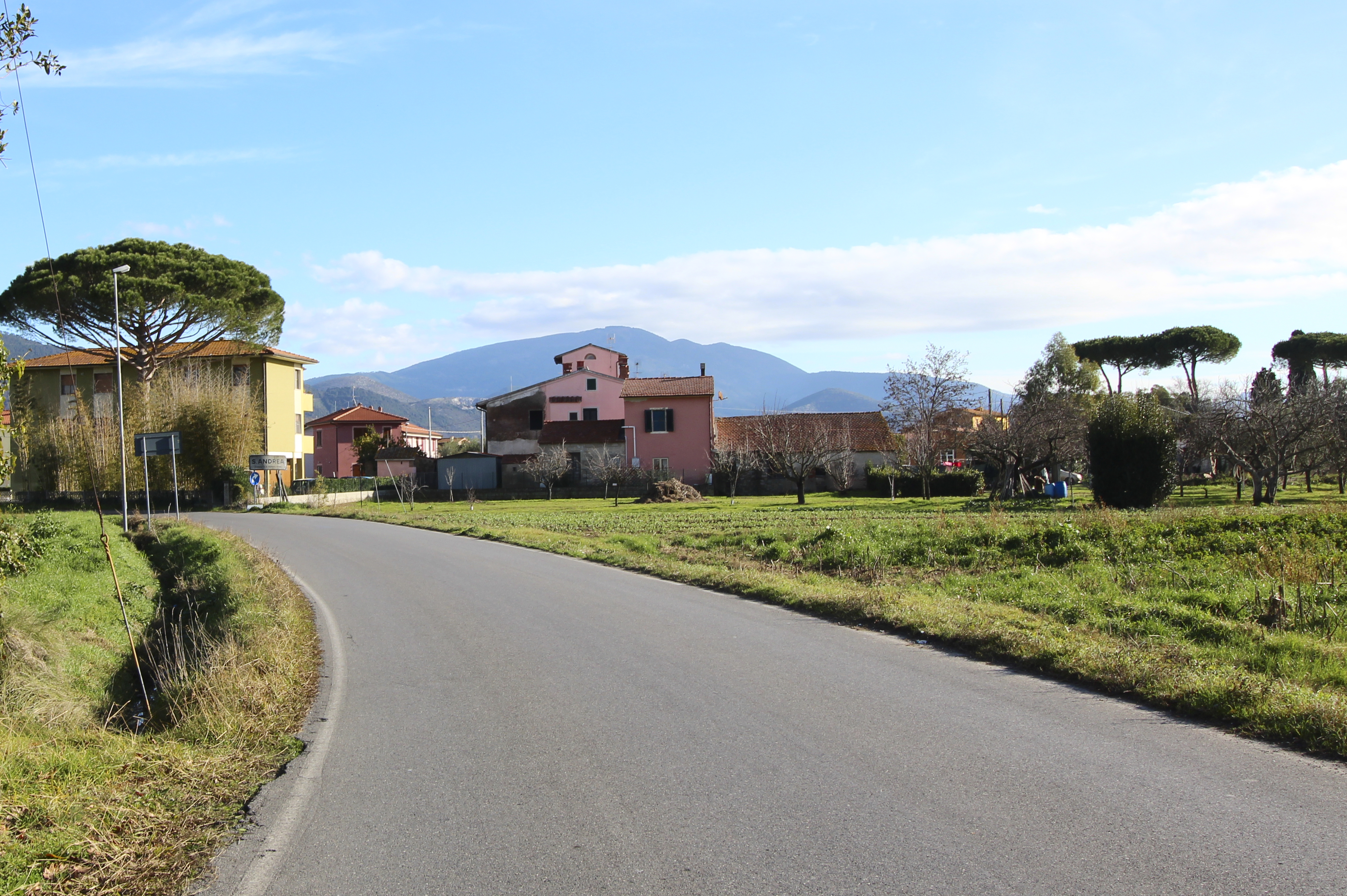

- Location of Sant'Andrea in Pescaiola in Italy
- Coordinates: 43°46′24″N 10°23′31″E
- Country: Italy
- Region: Tuscany
- Province: Pisa (PI)
- Comune: San Giuliano Terme
- Elevation: 3 m (9.8 ft)

Population (2011)
  - Total: 466
- Demonym: Santandreesi
- Time zone: UTC+1 (CET)
  - Summer (DST): UTC+2 (CEST)
- Postal code: 56017
- Dialing code: (+39) 050

Sant'Andrea in Pescaiola is a village in Tuscany, central Italy, administratively a frazione of the comune of San Giuliano Terme, province of Pisa. At the time of the 2001 census its population was 402.

Sant'Andrea in Pescaiola is about 7 km from Pisa and 6 km from San Giuliano Terme.
