= Alberto Batistoni =

Italian former footballer (born 1945)

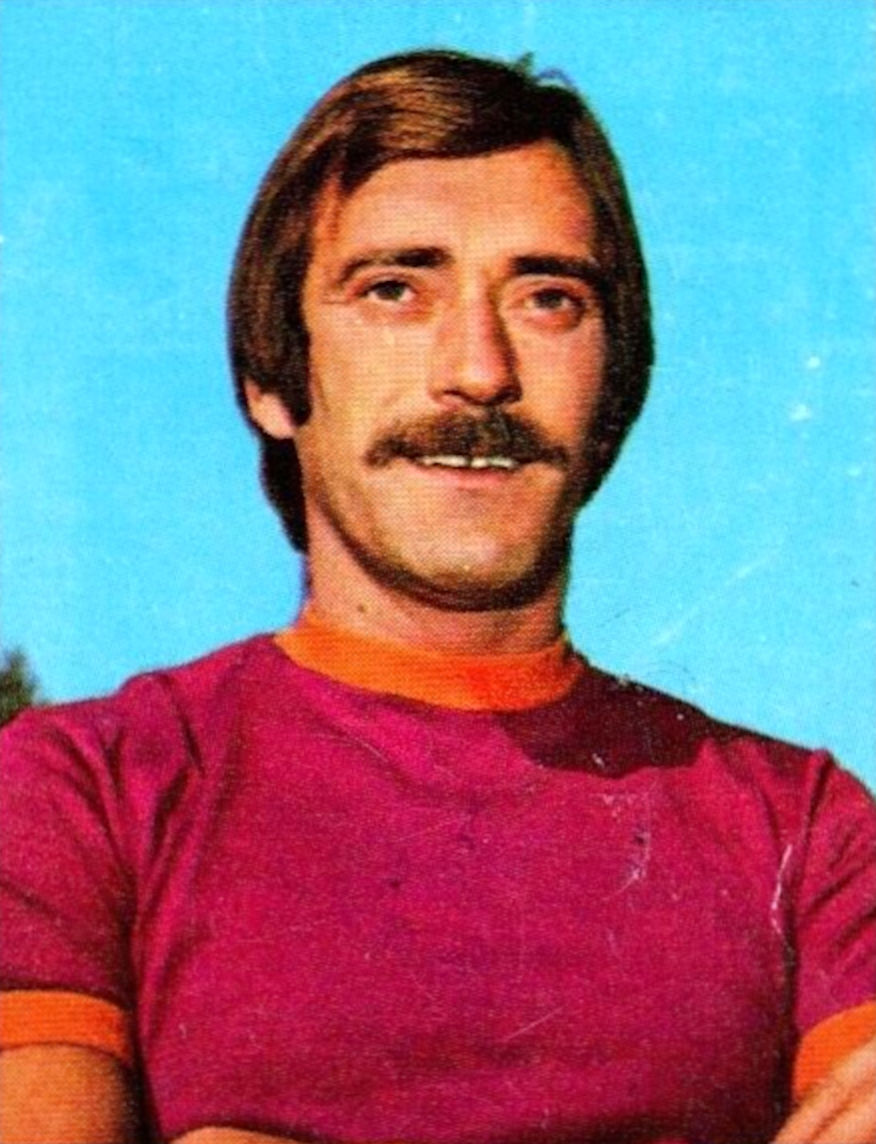
- Batistoni with Roma in 1975

Personal information
- Date of birth: 7 December 1945 (age 80)
- Place of birth: San Giuliano Terme, Italy
- Height: 1.80 m (5 ft 11 in)
- Position: Defender

Senior career*
Years	Team	Apps	(Gls)
1965–1966	Cuoiopelli	34	(0)
1966–1967	Fiorentina	0	(0)
1967–1973	Verona	138	(0)
1973–1976	Roma	69	(0)
1976–1977	Cesena	10	(0)
1977–1978	Spezia	24	(0)
- * Club domestic league appearances and goals

Alberto Batistoni (born 7 December 1945) is an Italian former footballer who played as a defender.

He played 9 seasons (195 games, no goals) in Serie A for Verona, Roma and Cesena.
