= Cesare Studiati =

Italian physician and physiologist (1821–1894)

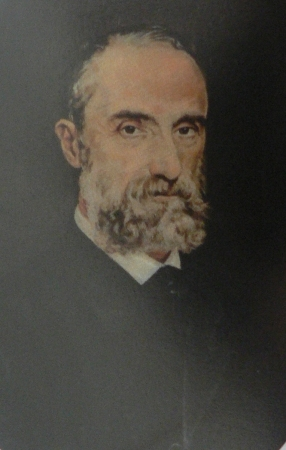
- Potrait of Cesare Studiati by Alvio Vaglini
- Born: Cesare Studiati Berni; 14 January 1821; Pisa, Grand Duchy of Tuscany
- Died: 20 November 1894 (aged 73); Molina di Quosa, Province of Pisa, Kingdom of Italy
- Education: University of Pisa
- Occupations: Physician, academic

Cesare Studiati Berni (14 January 1821 – 20 November 1894) was an Italian physician, physiologist, and academic. He was a professor of physiology at the University of Pisa, where he emphasized experimental approaches in medical education, and he made contributions to agricultural and oenological research.

== Life and career ==
Born in Pisa to Pietro Studiati Berni, a physician and university professor, and Giuseppa Castinelli, Cesare earned his medical degree in 1840. He began his academic career at the University of Pisa as an anatomical dissector.

He held teaching posts in animal anatomy, human physiology, and chemistry, and in 1859 was appointed professor of physiology and director of the Physiological Laboratory in Pisa. His scientific work combined observation and experimentation, and he conducted research in areas including sericulture and viticulture. He collaborated with Bettino Ricasoli on improving winemaking practices using chemical analysis.

Studiati Berni was an active member of the Accademia dei Georgofili and published extensively on physiological and agricultural topics. He also served as president of the Cassa di Risparmio di Pisa and held the position of dean of the Faculty of Medicine and Surgery.

On 27 August 1860, he married Giuseppina Agostini della Seta, a member of a noble family, and they had three children: Teresa, Laura, and Pietro, the latter of whom later became a prominent architect. He died at his family villa in Molina di Quosa near Pisa on 20 November 1894.
