= Ghezzano =

- Frazione
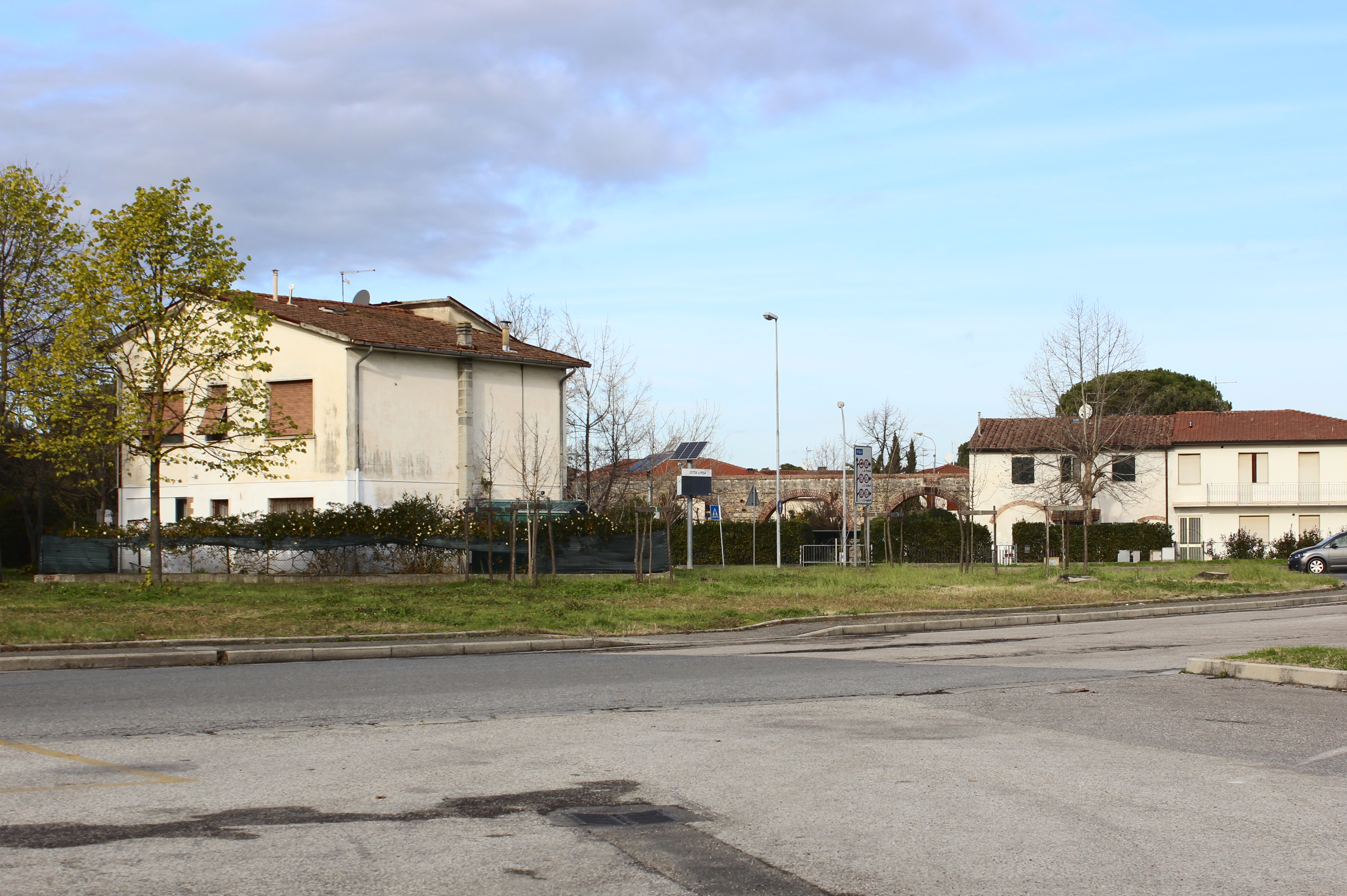

- Location of Ghezzano in Italy
- Coordinates: 43°43′23″N 10°25′57″E
- Country: Italy
- Region: Tuscany
- Province: Pisa (PI)
- Comune: San Giuliano Terme
- Elevation: 3 m (9.8 ft)

Population (2001)
  - Total: 3,689
- Demonym: Ghezzanesi
- Time zone: UTC+1 (CET)
  - Summer (DST): UTC+2 (CEST)
- Postal code: 56017
- Dialing code: (+39) 050

Ghezzano is a village in Tuscany, central Italy, administratively a frazione of the comune of San Giuliano Terme, province of Pisa. At the time of the 2001 census its population was 3,689.

Ghezzano is about 5 km from San Giuliano Terme.

== Geography ==
The village of Ghezzano is located in the Pisan Valdarno and is located in the flat area on the right bank of the Arno river. The historical urbanization develops in the area near to the Arno, while the most recent along the provincial road 2 Vicarese that connects Pisa to Calci and the Pisan Lungomonte, which laps the historic center of the city of Pisa to the north-east, immediately in urban continuity with the district of Pratale. In fact, Ghezzano being a fraction of San Giuliano Terme, the village is commonly considered as a district of Pisa, being part of a single conurbation with the city.
