= Pietro Studiati Berni (physician) =

Italian physician and academic (1781–1841)

- Born: 3 September 1781; Pisa, Grand Duchy of Tuscany
- Died: 3 July 1841 (aged 59); Pisa, Grand Duchy of Tuscany
- Occupations: Medical doctor, academic

Pietro Studiati Berni (3 September 1781 – 3 July 1841) was an Italian medical doctor and academic of the Grand Duchy of Tuscany.

== Life and career ==
He was the son of Cesare Studiati, a physician who briefly directed the Greek-Russian College in Pisa and served at the court of Catherine II, and Teresa Mugnai. Pietro had two siblings, Alessio and Maddalena.

He graduated in medicine at the University of Pisa on 2 June 1802 and became chief medical officer of the Pisa health department in 1808. That same year he inherited the Berni family estate and villa at Molina di Quosa, adopting the surname Studiati Berni.

Studiati Berni held chairs in Pathology, Hygiene, Therapy, and Forensic Medicine at the University of Pisa. He specialized in physiology, pathology, and pharmacology, translating works by Gilbert Blane and François Broussais. He was a member of the Accademia dei Georgofili and collaborated with Gaetano Savi on the Giornale de' letterati. In 1810, he was appointed to the new chair of Materia medica and Pharmacy at the University of Pisa, and in January 1814 he became director of the newly established Pharmaceutical Laboratory. Following the return of the Grand Duke, he moved to the chair of Medical Institutions, focusing on medical pathology and hygiene.

In the late 1830s, he became personal physician to Louis Bonaparte and, from 1838, emeritus professor and chief medical officer of the Livorno health department. He was president of the Accademia Labronica, a corresponding member of the Società Medico-Fisica Fiorentina, and took part in the first Congress of Italian Scientists in 1839.

Studiati Berni married Giuseppa Castinelli, the sister of engineer Ridolfo, in 1819 and had three children, Cesare, Alessandro and Luisa. He died in Pisa on 3 July 1841 from complications following pneumonia.

== Sources ==
- La prima riunione degli scienziati italiani: Pisa, 1839. Notizie biografiche e bibliografiche. Pisa: Giardini. 1989.
- Bodei, Chiara; Finelli, Pietro, eds. (2021). 1839: la prima Riunione degli Scienziati Italiani. Atti della giornata di studi tenuta a 180 anni di distanza. Pisa: ETS.
- Fedeli, Carlo (1913). L'insegnamento della patologia generale nell'Università di Pisa. Cenni tratti dalla storia della Facoltà di Medicina durante i secoli XVII-XIX-XIX. Pisa: Mariotti.
