= Pappiana =

- Frazione
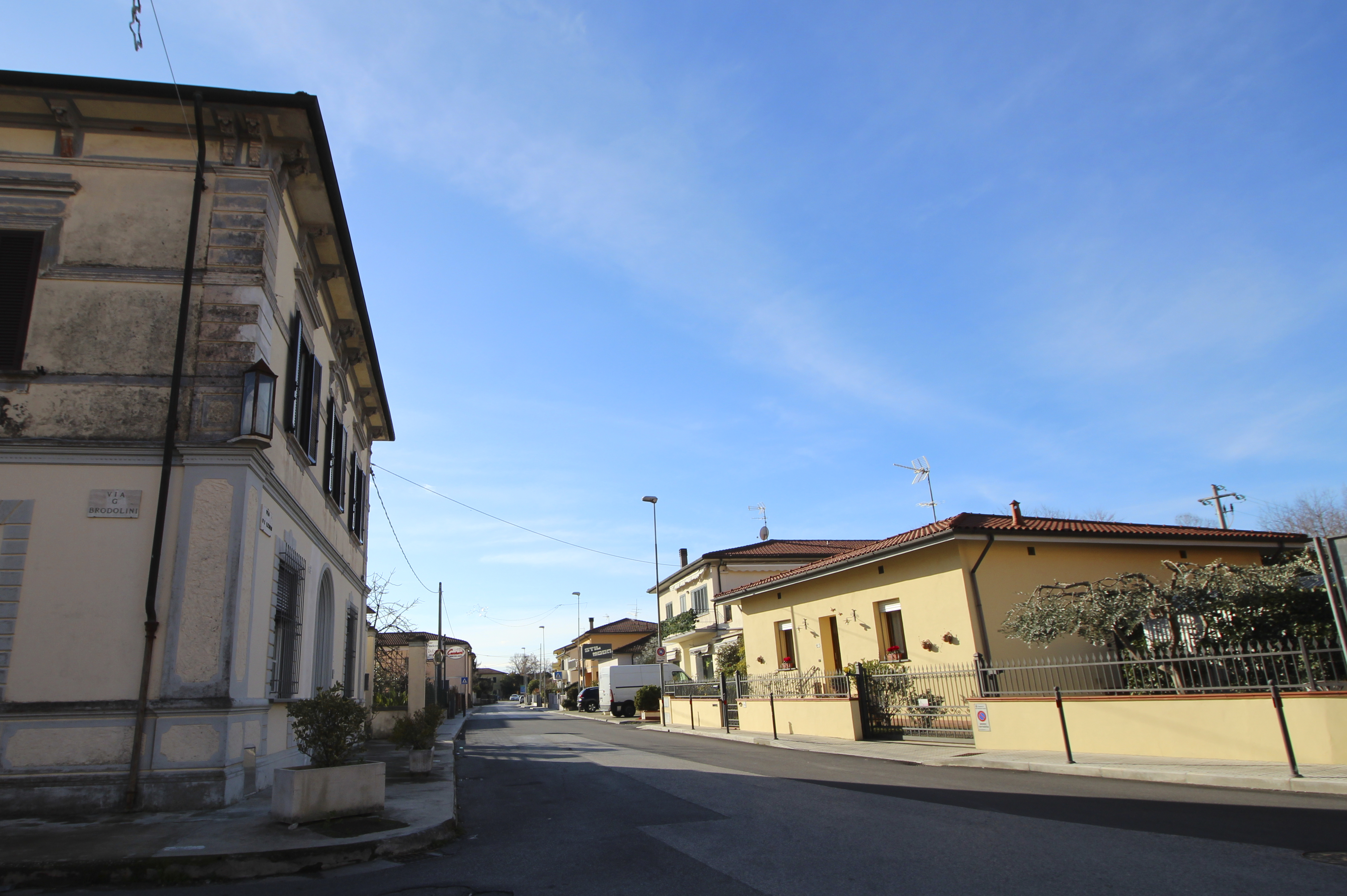

- Location of Pappiana in Italy
- Coordinates: 43°46′42″N 10°24′51″E
- Country: Italy
- Region: Tuscany
- Province: Pisa (PI)
- Comune: San Giuliano Terme
- Elevation: 10 m (33 ft)

Population
  - Total: 1,100
- Time zone: UTC+1 (CET)
  - Summer (DST): UTC+2 (CEST)
- Postal code: 56017
- Dialing code: (+39) 050

Pappiana is a village in Tuscany, central Italy, administratively a frazione of the comune of San Giuliano Terme, province of Pisa. At the time of the 2006 parish census its population was 1,100.

Pappiana is about 7 km from Pisa and 3 km from San Giuliano Terme.
