= Madonna dell'Acqua =

- Frazione
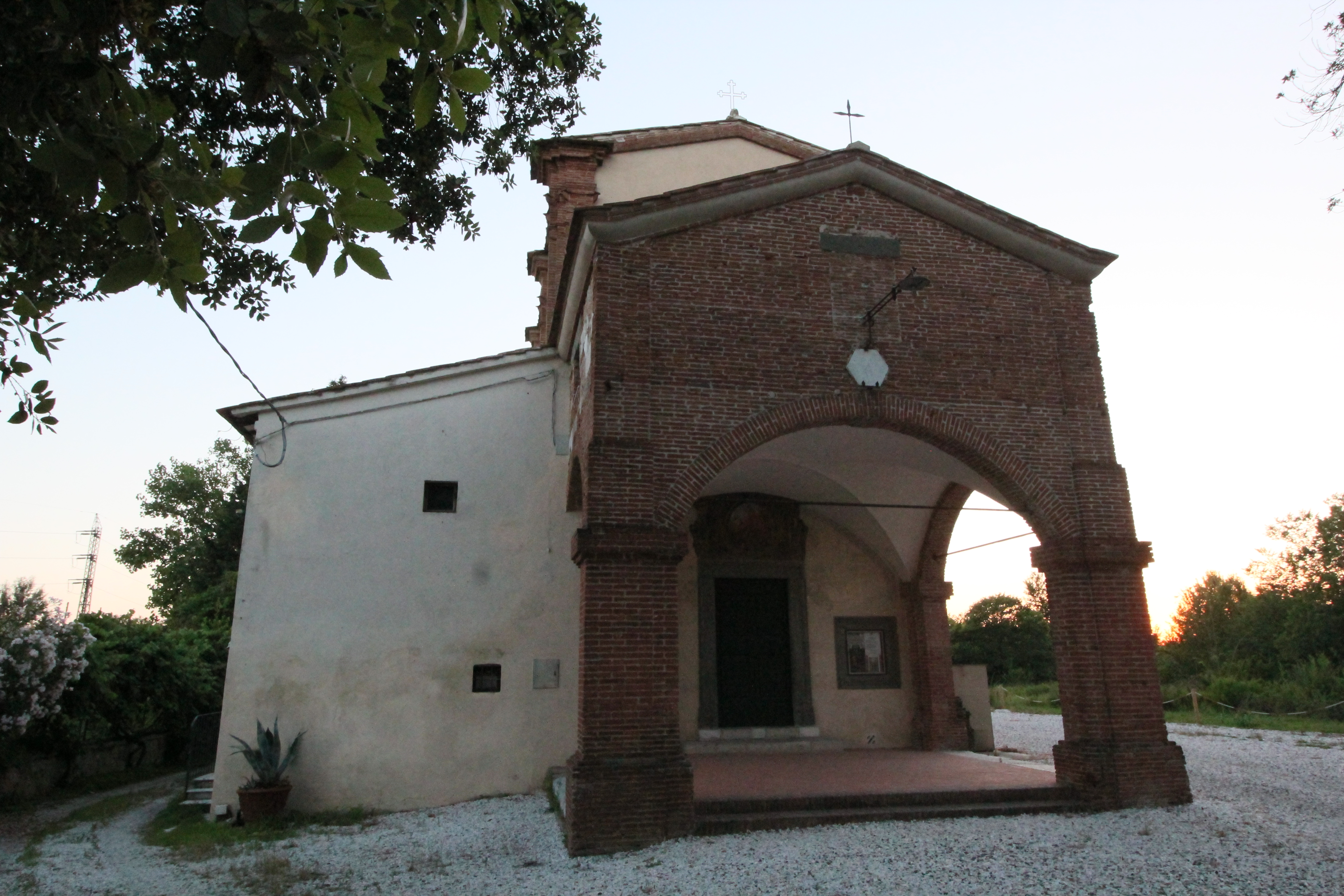
- The sanctuary of Immacolata Concezione

- Location of Madonna dell'Acqua in Italy
- Coordinates: 43°44′57″N 10°21′50″E
- Country: Italy
- Region: Tuscany
- Province: Pisa (PI)
- Comune: San Giuliano Terme
- Elevation: 3 m (9.8 ft)

Population (2011)
  - Total: 1,595
- Time zone: UTC+1 (CET)
  - Summer (DST): UTC+2 (CEST)
- Postal code: 56017
- Dialing code: (+39) 050

Madonna dell'Acqua is a village in Tuscany, central Italy, administratively a frazione of the comune of San Giuliano Terme, province of Pisa. At the time of the 2001 census its population was 1,531.

Madonna dell'Acqua is about 2 km from Pisa and 9 km from San Giuliano Terme.
