= Colognole, San Giuliano Terme =

Colognole
- Frazione
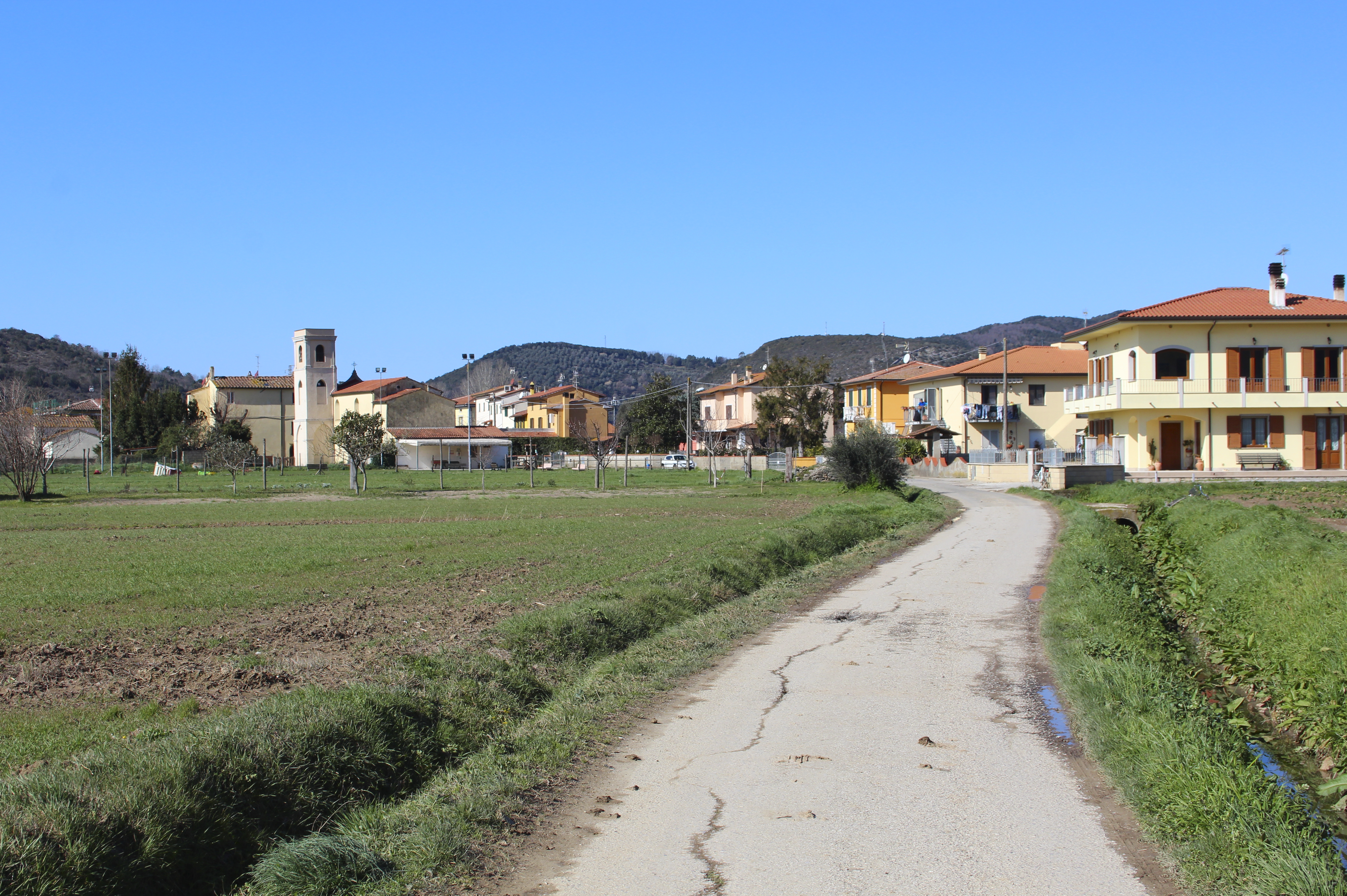

- Location of Colognole in Italy
- Coordinates: 43°48′10″N 10°24′17″E
- Country: Italy
- Region: Tuscany
- Province: Pisa (PI)
- Comune: San Giuliano Terme
- Elevation: 8 m (26 ft)

Population (2011)
  - Total: 164
- Demonym: Colognolesi
- Time zone: UTC+1 (CET)
  - Summer (DST): UTC+2 (CEST)
- Postal code: 56017
- Dialing code: (+39) 050

Colognole is a village in Tuscany, central Italy, administratively a frazione of the comune of San Giuliano Terme, province of Pisa. At the time of the 2001 census its population was 164.

Colognole is about 10 km from Pisa and 7 km from San Giuliano Terme.
