= Arena Metato =

- Frazione
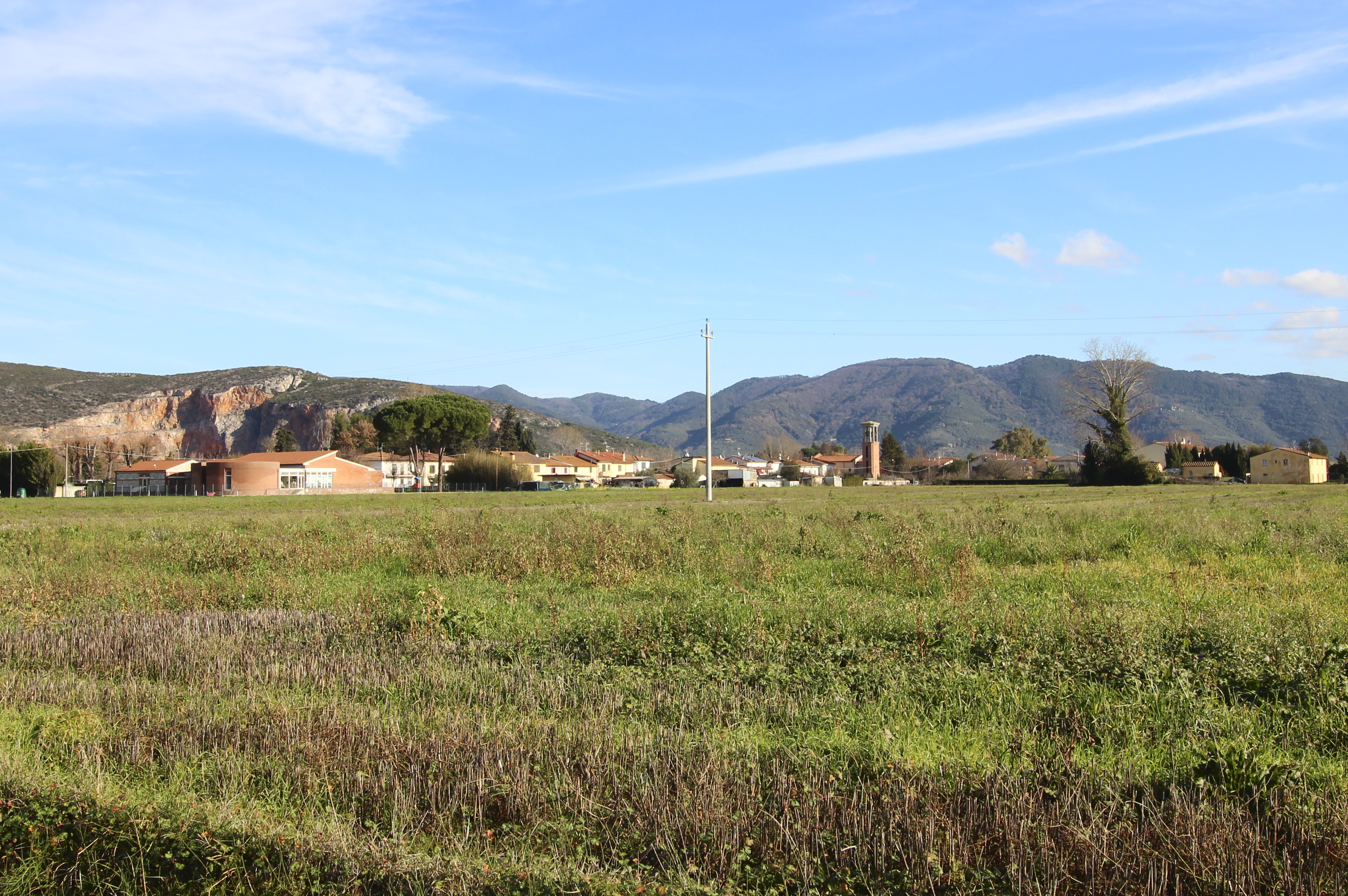

- Location of Arena Metato in Italy
- Coordinates: 43°46′22″N 10°22′21″E
- Country: Italy
- Region: Tuscany
- Province: Pisa (PI)
- Comune: San Giuliano Terme
- Elevation: 3 m (9.8 ft)

Population (2011)
  - Total: 2,115
- Demonym(s): Arenesi, Metatesi
- Time zone: UTC+1 (CET)
  - Summer (DST): UTC+2 (CEST)
- Postal code: 56017
- Dialing code: (+39) 050

Arena Metato is a village in Tuscany, central Italy, administratively a frazione of the comune of San Giuliano Terme, province of Pisa.

The village is the result of the fusion of the two hamlets of Arena (pop. 204) and Metato (pop. 1,911).

Arena Metato is about 7 km (4.3 mi) from Pisa and 10 km (6.2 mi) from San Giuliano Terme.

== Notable people ==
- Nazario Pardini, (1937) poet, essayst and journalist
