= Nazario Pardini =

Italian essayist and poet

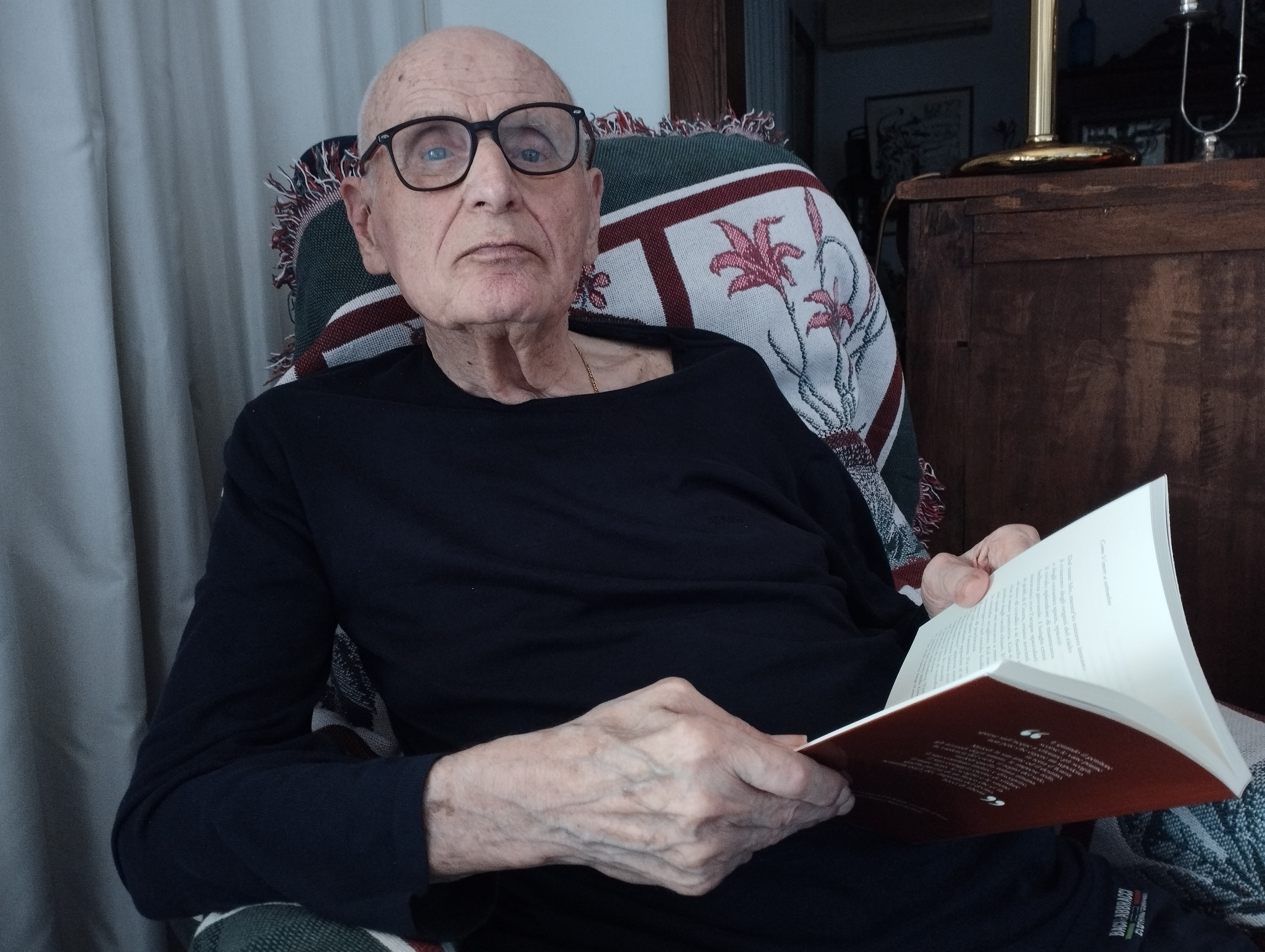
- Prof. Nazario Pardini on 6th June 2025
- Born: 25 February 1937 (age 89); Arena Metato, Italy
- Education: University of Pisa
- Occupation: expert in Italian literature
- Notable work: Dicotomie (2013); Nel frattempo viviamo (2020)

Nazario Pardini (born in Arena Metato on 25 February 1937) is an Italian poet, essayist, blogger and expert in Italian literature.

== Career ==
Born in 1937, Pardini graduated from high school and with degrees in comparative literature and philosophy from the University of Pisa.

He was also an Italian literature teacher and gave critical contributions to contemporary poetry. He published various poems and works of literary criticism. He lives between Arena Metato, where he is born and Torre del Lago.

== Selected publications ==
- 2000: Si aggirava nei boschi una fanciulla. 45 momenti di un viaggio fantastico, ma poco inverosimile, tra i predicatori dell'Occidente, éditions ETS
- 2002: Le simulazioni dell'azzurro - Poesie 1997-2001, éditions ETS
- 2010: Canti damore, Booksprint Edizioni
- 2011: Riccardo, racconti brevi, Booksprint Edizioni
- 2013: Dicotomie, éditions The Writer
- 2015: I canti dell'assenza, éditions The Writer
- 2017: Di mare e di vita, éditions Macabor
- 2020: Nel frattempo viviamo, Guido Miano Editore
- 2021: I dintorni della solitudine, Guido Miano Editore

== Honours and awards ==
- Premio Micheloni, Sirio Guerrieri in La Spezia
- Premio CinqueTerre in Portovenere
- Premio Portus Lunae in La Spezia
- Premio Città di Pontremoli in Pontremoli
- Premio Le Regioni in Pisa
- 1° Premio Ponte Vecchio lifetime award, in Florence, 2014/2015
- Apollinari Diplome awarded from Facoltà di Scienze della Comunicazione Sociale of Salesian Pontifical University
- Premio Le Muse in Florence
- Premio Mario Tobino in Vezzano Ligure

== Bibliography ==
- Delos (Autori contemporanei di fine secolo, 1997, G. Laterza, Bari)
- Poeti e Muse (antologie scolastiche, 1995, 1996, Lineacultura, Milano)
- Blu di Prussia (Antologie, 1997, 1998)
- Antologia Poetica Campana (1999, pages de P. Celentano, A. Malinconico, e Bárberi Squarotti)
- Storia della letteratura italiana del XX secolo (1999, Helicon, Arezzo, au soin de G. Nocentini, coll. S. Ramat - N. Bonifazi - G. Luti)
- Dizionario Autori Italiani Contemporanei (2001, Guido Miano Editore, Milano)
- Dizionario degli autori italiani del secondo Novecento (2001, Edizioni Helicon, Arezzo, a cura di Ferruccio Ulivi, Neuro Bonifazi, Lia Bronzi)
- L’amore, la guerra (au soin de Aldo Forbice, Rai – Eri, Radio Televisione Italiana, Roma, 2004)
- L’evoluzione delle forme poetiche (Kairòs edizioni, Napoli, 2013)
