= San Paolo a Ripa d'Arno =

Church in Pisa, Tuscany, Italy

Coordinates: 43°42′46.1″N 10°23′36.58″E

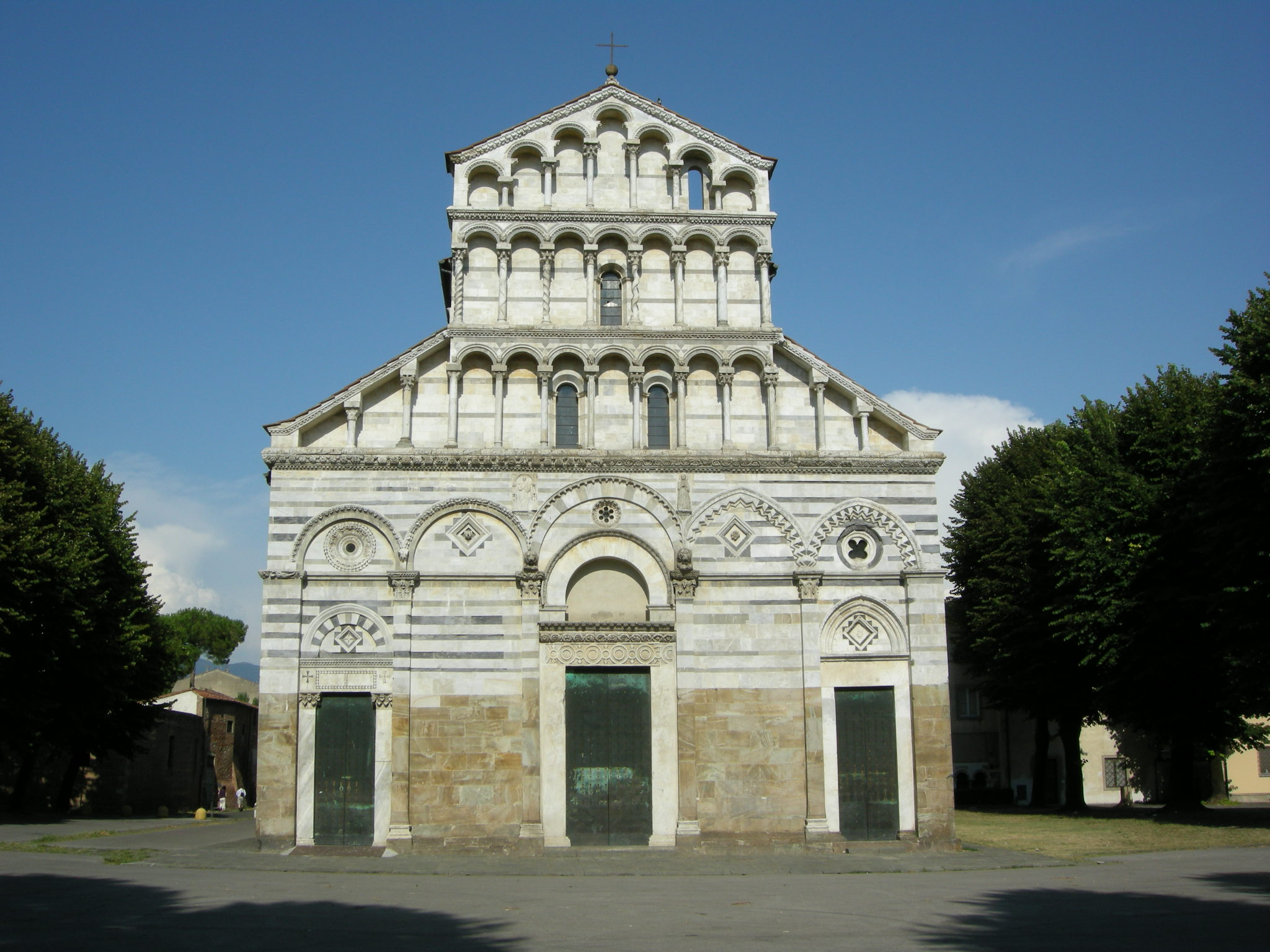
Façade.

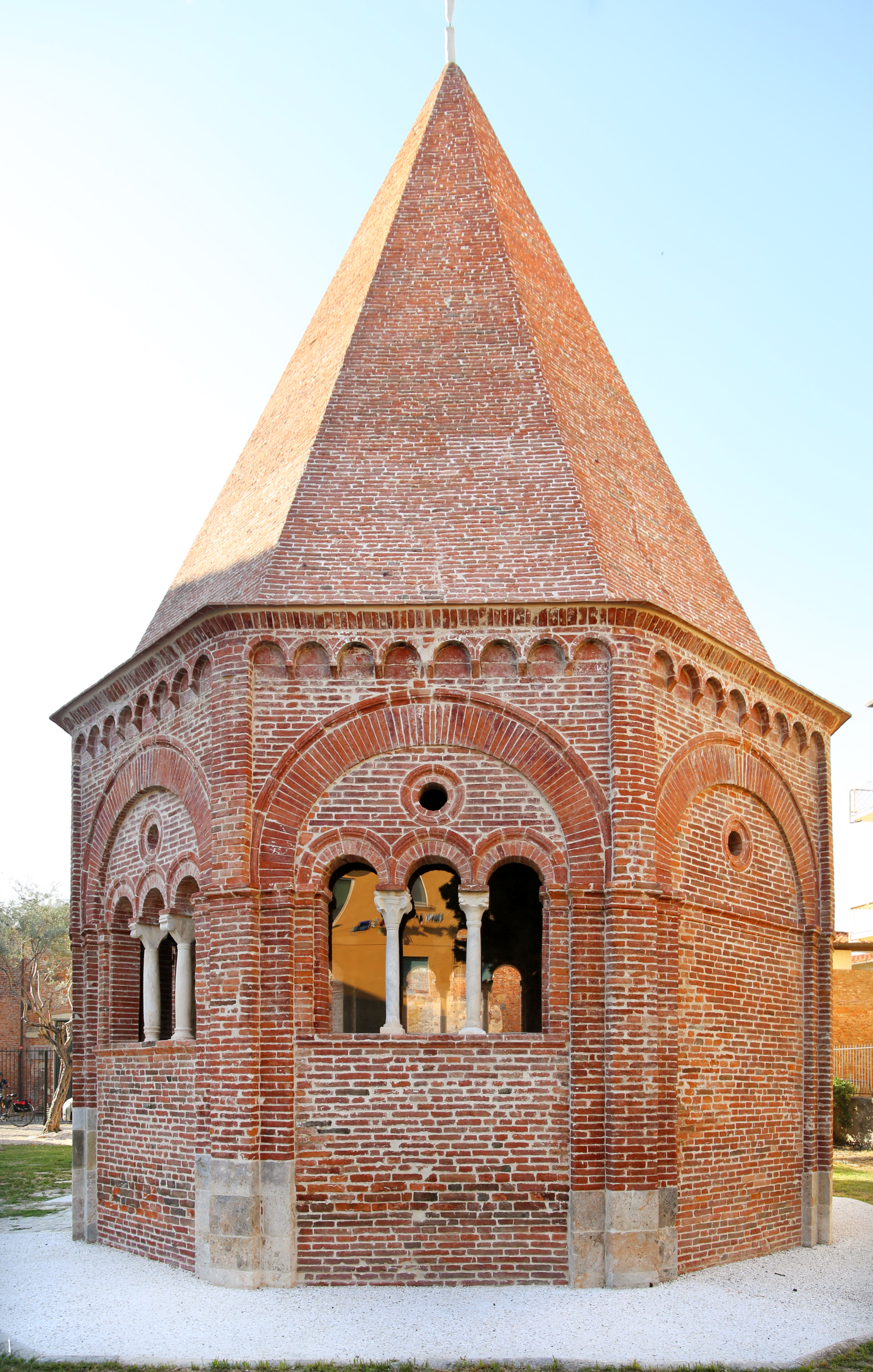
St. Agatha Chapel.

San Paolo a Ripa d'Arno (St. Paul on the bank of the Arno) is a Roman Catholic church in Pisa, region of Tuscany, Italy. It is a pre-eminent example of Tuscan Romanesque church architecture. The church is also locally known as Duomo vecchio (old cathedral).

== The church ==
Reports of the founding of the church trace to around 925, but by 1032, a church structure existed. It was initially affiliated with a Benedictine monastery. By 1092, the church was annexed to a monastery of the Vallumbrosan monks and, later to a hospital 1147.

The building was modified in the 11th-12th centuries in a style similar to that of the local Duomo, being reconsecrated by Pope Eugene III in 1148.

In 1409 the building complex was transferred to the administration of the cardinal Landolfo di Marramauro, then since 1552 was given to the Grifoni family of San Miniato. After 1565, it was transferred to the Holy Order of St. Stephen. After its suppression, in 1798 the church became a Parish.

In 1853 the building underwent some significant reconstruction, directed by Pietro Bellini, which aimed to restore its romanesque origins. During the Second World War, this church, like many in Pisa, suffered damage. Restoration efforts were pursued in 1949–1952. In the course of this work, the buildings in the back were demolished, restoring the small Sant'Agata chapel to its original free-standing state.

The exterior has bichrome marble bands which re-use Roman stones. The façade, designed in the 12th century, but completed in 14th maybe by Giovanni Pisano, has two corps with pilaster strips, blind arches, marble intarsias and three orders of loggias in the upper section.

The interior is on the Latin cross plan with a nave and two aisles divided by columns in granite from Elba, an apse and a dome on the crossing with the transept. It houses a 13th-century Crucifix on panel, frescoes by Buonamico Buffalmacco and a Madonna with Saints by Turino Vanni (14th century), but most of all a 2nd-century Roman sarcophagus used as medieval tomb. The relief on this sarcophagus was used as a model by both Nicola Pisano and his pupil Arnolfo di Cambio.

== Sant'Agata Chapel ==
Behind the church is located the St. Agatha Chapel, a small Romanesque chapel built around 1063 by the monks. It was built to celebrate the conquest of the city of Palermo in that year and dedicated to the Saint, who was martyred in Sicily. However, the first written attestation of the chapel's existence is from 1132.

It is an octagonal structure in brickwork, featuring pilasters, arches including mullioned windows and an unusual pyramidal cusp. The interior houses remains of 12th century wall decorations. The choice of the octagonal plan and the date of construction (i.e. the 12th century) suggest Diotisalvi as its architect.

Until the Second World War, the chapel was within a cloister which blocked it from view from outside. In the bombardment of 1943, the surrounding structure was destroyed and when it was reconstructed it was decided not to restore it and to leave the chapel in an area of public parkland instead.
