= Molina di Quosa =

- Frazione
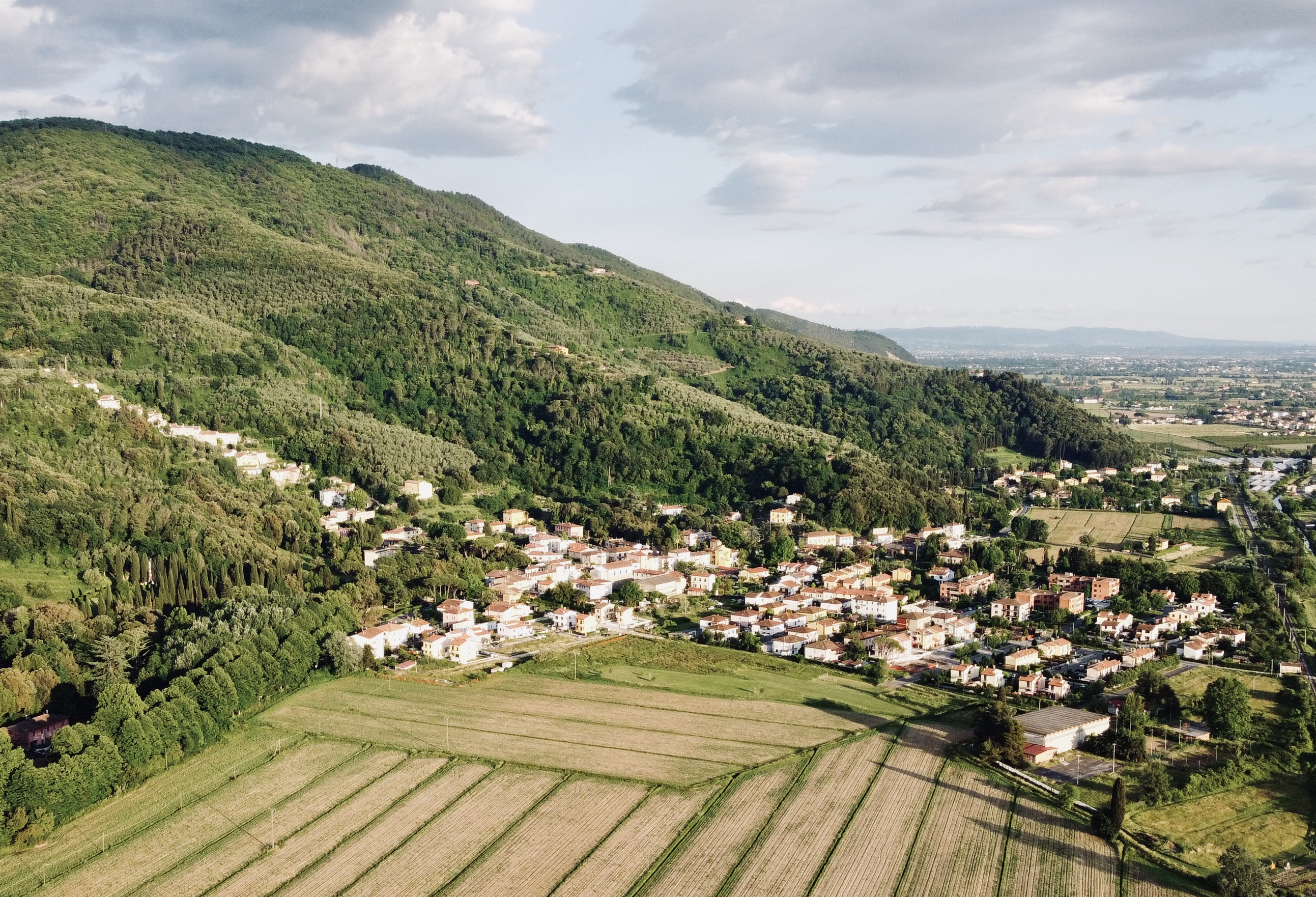

- Location of Molina di Quosa in Italy
- Coordinates: 43°47′43″N 10°25′21″E
- Country: Italy
- Region: Tuscany
- Province: Pisa (PI)
- Comune: San Giuliano Terme
- Elevation: 10 m (33 ft)

Population (2001)
  - Total: 1,090
- Demonym: Molinesi
- Time zone: UTC+1 (CET)
  - Summer (DST): UTC+2 (CEST)
- Postal code: 56017
- Dialing code: (+39) 050

Molina di Quosa is a village in Tuscany, central Italy, administratively a frazione of the comune of San Giuliano Terme, province of Pisa.

Molina di Quosa is about 10 km (6.2 mi) from Pisa and 4 km (2.5 mi) from San Giuliano Terme.

== Bibliography ==
- Caciagli, Giuseppe (1972). Pisa e la sua provincia. Vol. 3. Pisa: Colombo Cursi Editore.
