= Higher education in Italy =

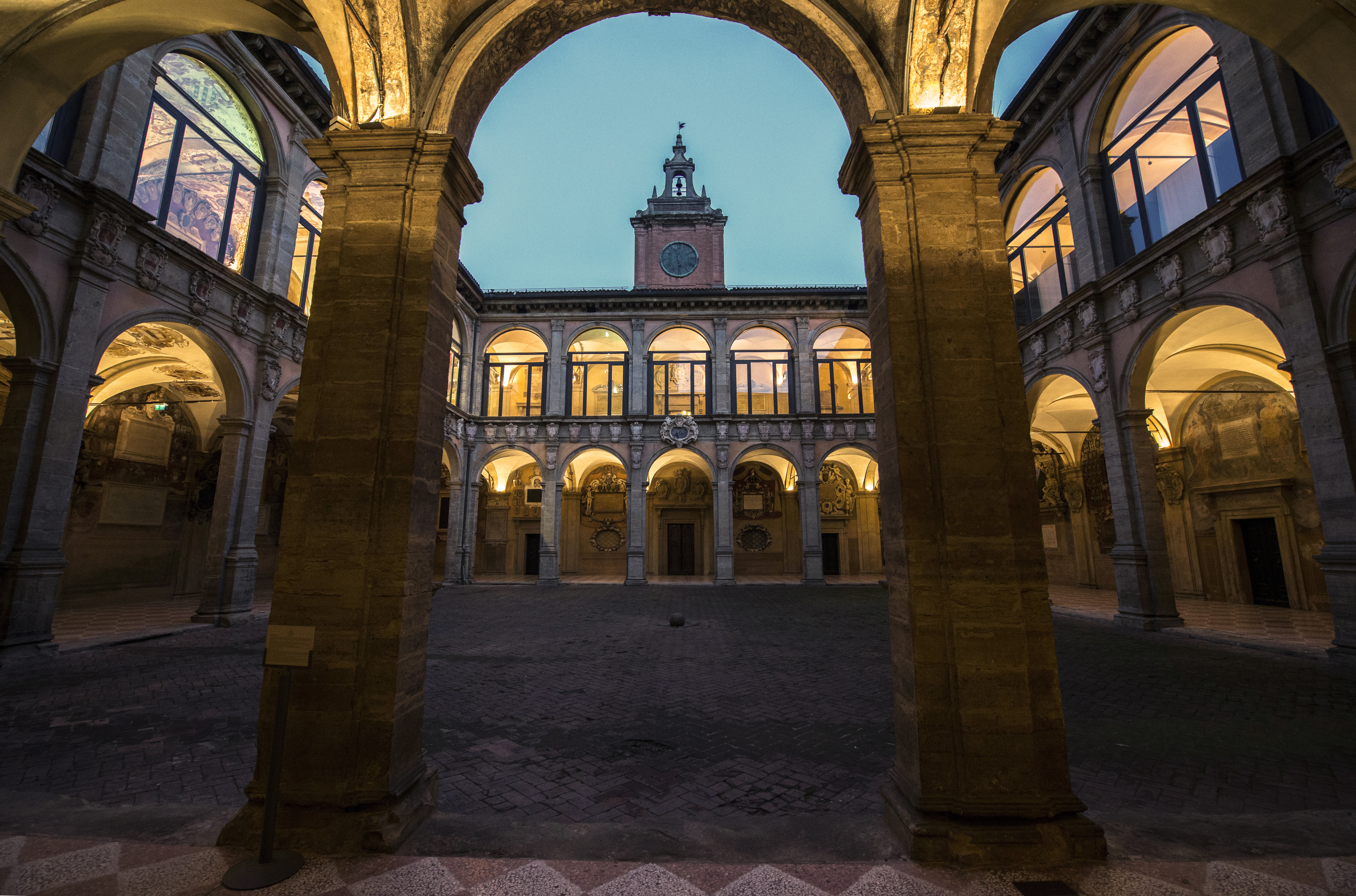
Bologna University, established in AD 1088, is the world's oldest academic institution.

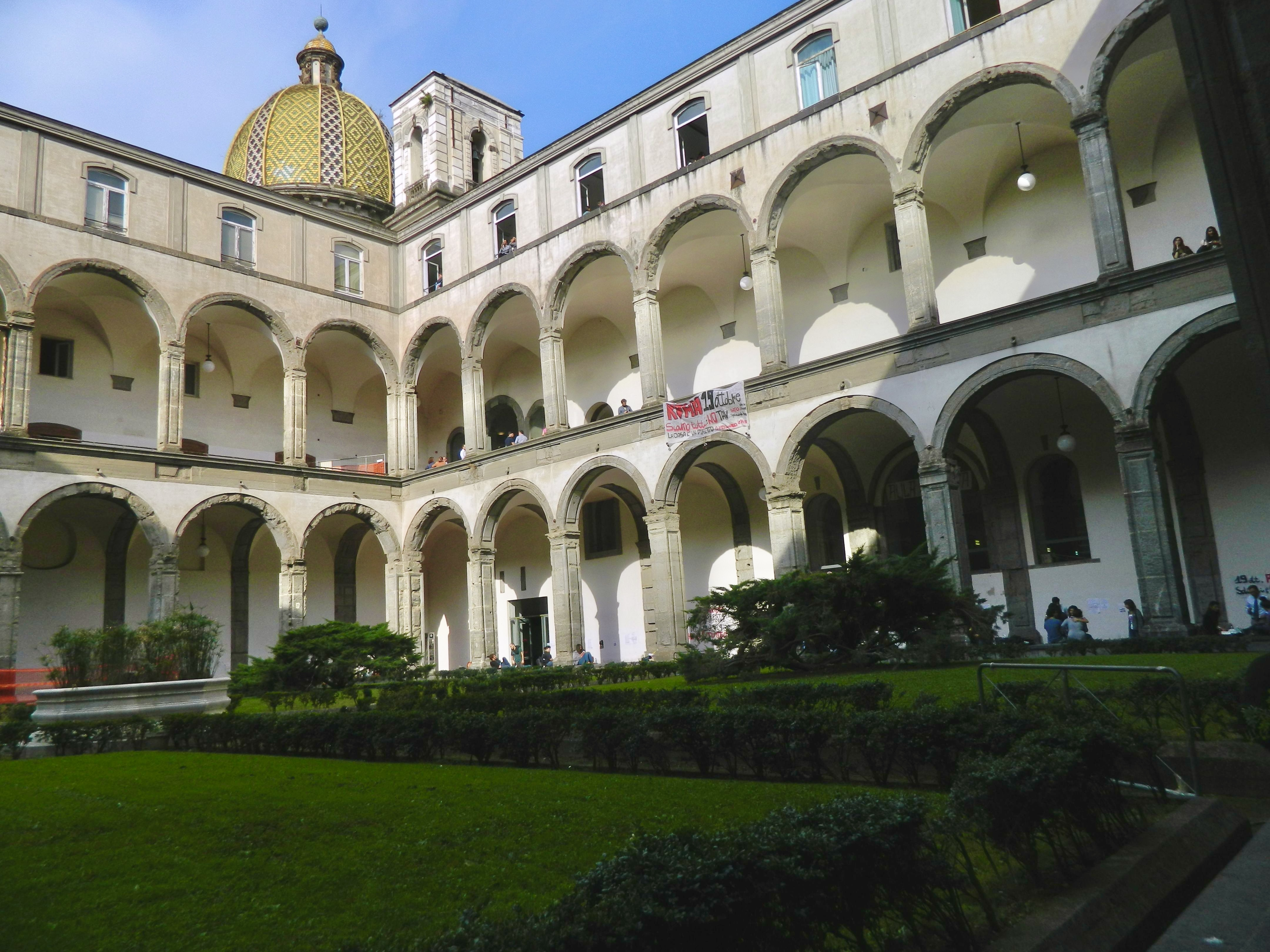
Established in 1224 by Frederick II, Holy Roman Emperor, University of Naples Federico II in Italy is the world's oldest state-funded university in continuous operation.

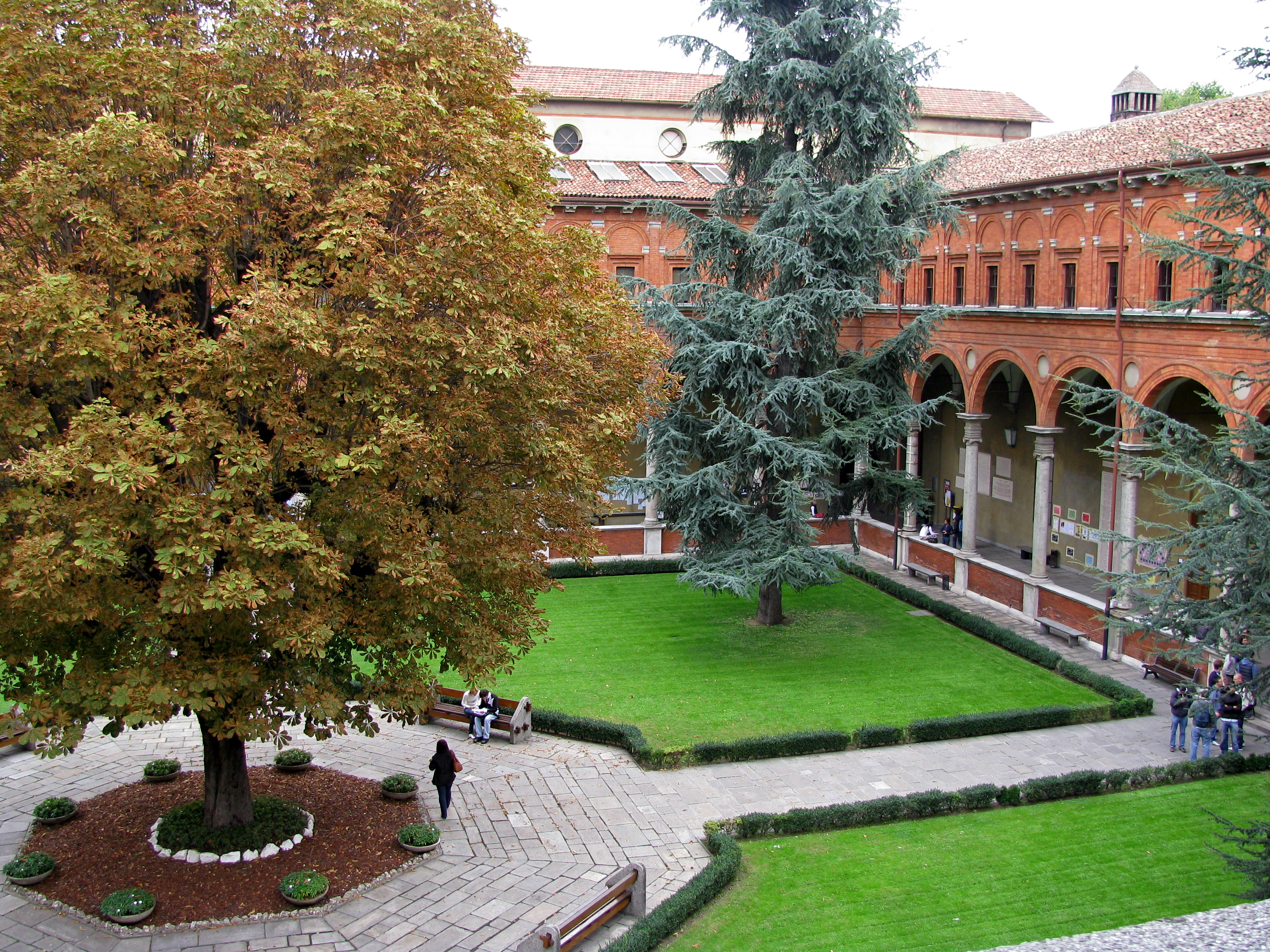
Università Cattolica del Sacro Cuore, an Italian private research university founded in 1921. Its main campus is located in Milan, Italy, with satellite campuses in Brescia, Piacenza, Cremona and Rome. Degrees are offered both in Italian and in English.

Higher education in Italy is mainly provided by a large and international network of public and state affiliated universities. State-run universities of Italy are under the supervision of the Italian Ministry of Education. There is also a number of private universities and state-run post-secondary educational centers providing a vocational instruction.

Italian universities are among the oldest universities in the world. In particular the University of Bologna (founded in 1088, the oldest university in the world), the University of Padua, founded in 1222, and the University of Naples, founded in 1224, are among the most ancient state universities in Europe. Most universities in Italy are state-supported.

35 Italian universities were ranked among the world's top 500 in 2025. The highest-ranked three were the University of Bologna (130), the Scuola Normale Superiore di Pisa (137), and Sapienza University of Rome (170).

An OECD report found that 31% of Italians aged 25–34 in 2023 had a university degree, lower than the average for OECD countries of 48%. The report said that the university sector in Italy is underfunded, that not all Italian universities are selective, and that students are more likely than in other OECD countries to complete their degree late or drop out.

In 2023, 385,952 students graduated, of whom 57.3% were women.

== Structure ==
=== Universities ===
Universities in Italy fits the framework of the Bologna Process since the adoption, in 1999, of the so-called 3+2 system. The first level degree is the Laurea triennale that can be achieved after three years of studies. Selected students can then complete their studies in the following step: two additional years of specialization which leads to the Laurea Magistrale.

The "Laurea triennale" corresponds roughly to a bachelor's degree while the "Laurea Magistrale" corresponds to a master's degree. Only the Laurea Magistrale grants access to third cycle programmes (Post-MA degrees, doctorates or specializing schools), that last 2 to 5 years (usually completing a PhD takes 3 years). However, there is just a single five-year degree "Laurea Magistrale Quinquennale" (Five-Year Master of Arts) for some programmes such as Law (Facoltà di Giurisprudenza), Arts (Accademia di Belle Arti) and Music (Conservatorio di Musica). Medical schools (Facoltà di Medicina e Chirurgia) are part of some universities and they only offer six-year courses. The title for MA/MFA/MD/MEd graduate students is Dottore (abbreviation in Dott./Dott.ssa or Dr., meaning Doctor). This title is not to be confused with the PhD and Post-MA graduates, whose title is Dottore di Ricerca (Research Doctor or Philosophy Doctor).

The Italian master's degree should not be confused with Italian "Masters" that are one-year specialistic postgraduate courses which guarantee a more practical education but do not necessarily give access to doctoral studies.

Universities in Italy can be divided into 4 groups:

- state-funded public universities: this category comprises most Italian universities, particularly the largest institutions.
- universities funded by other public authority (other than the state, such as Provinces): this is the case of the Free University of Bozen-Bolzano.
- private universities officially recognized by the Ministry of Education.
- superior graduate schools, which focus only on postgraduate education.

==== Superior Graduate Schools ====
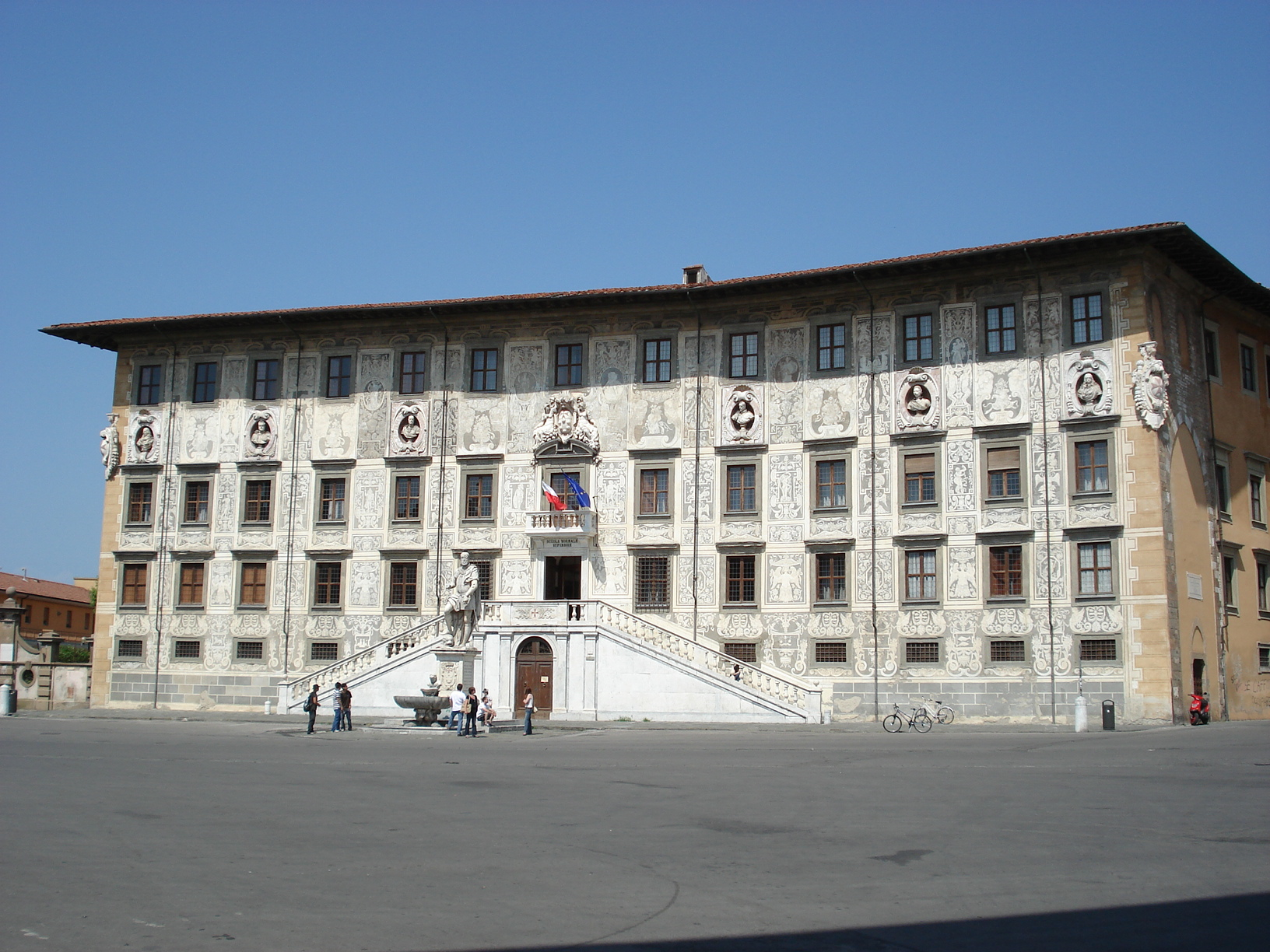
Palazzo della Carovana, Scuola Normale Superiore di Pisa main building

The Superior Graduate School (Grandes écoles) or Scuola Superiore Universitaria offer recognized national and international titles, including the Diploma di Perfezionamento equivalent to a Doctorate, Dottorato di Ricerca i.e. Research Doctorate or Doctor Philosophiae i.e. Ph.D. and are recognized by the Ministry of Education, Universities and Research (Italy) (MIUR) as fully autonomous. Some of them also organize courses master's degree, individually, or jointly with the universities with whom they work like Bologna Business School or MIP Politecnico di Milano.

There are three Superior Graduate Schools with "university status", three institutes with the status of Doctoral Colleges, which function at graduate and postgraduate level. Nine further schools are direct offshoots of the universities (i.e. do not have their own 'university status'). They are:

- Ca' Foscari International College (Ca' Foscari University of Venice) – Established in 2012, it offers an honors program focused on international studies, climate change, and global economics, housed on the historical center of Venice.
- Collegio Superiore of the University of Bologna – Founded in 1998, it integrates standard degree programs with interdisciplinary courses and dedicated tutoring for high-achieving students.
- ISUFI of the University of Salento – Established in 1999 in Lecce, it specializes in high-level interdisciplinary training across natural sciences, engineering, and humanities.
- 'Ferdinando Rossi' School of Advanced Studies of the University of Turin – Founded in 2009, it provides advanced interdisciplinary research seminars and governance studies.
- 'Giacomo Leopardi' School of Advanced Studies of the University of Macerata – Created in 2008, it focuses primarily on the humanities, social sciences, and law.
- Galilean School of Higher Education of the University of Padua – Founded in 2004 in collaboration with the Scuola Normale Superiore di Pisa, it is structured into Humanities, Natural Sciences, and Social Sciences classes.
- Scuola Superiore 'Di Toppo Wassermann' of the University of Udine – Established in 2004, it offers specialized research paths in science, technology, and humanities.
- Scuola Superiore di Catania of the University of Catania – Founded in 1998, it is modeled after the Scuola Normale to foster young talents in Mediterranean research and innovation.
- School for Advanced Studies (SSAS) of Sapienza University of Rome – Created in 2011, it organizes advanced interdisciplinary courses divided into Academic Classes of Humanities, Science and Technology, and Life Sciences.

The first one is the Scuola Normale Superiore di Pisa (founded in 1810 by Napoleon as a branch of École Normale Supérieure), taking the model of organization from the famous École Normale Supérieure.

Sant'Anna School of Advanced Studies also has long history of existence within overall Italian educational excellence, as its origins are in Collegio Medico-Giuridico of Scuola Normale Superiore di Pisa and Conservatorio di Sant’Anna, an even older educational institution originating its roots in the 14th century.

These institutions are commonly referred to as "Schools of Excellence" (i.e. "Scuole di Eccellenza").

=== Professional higher education ===
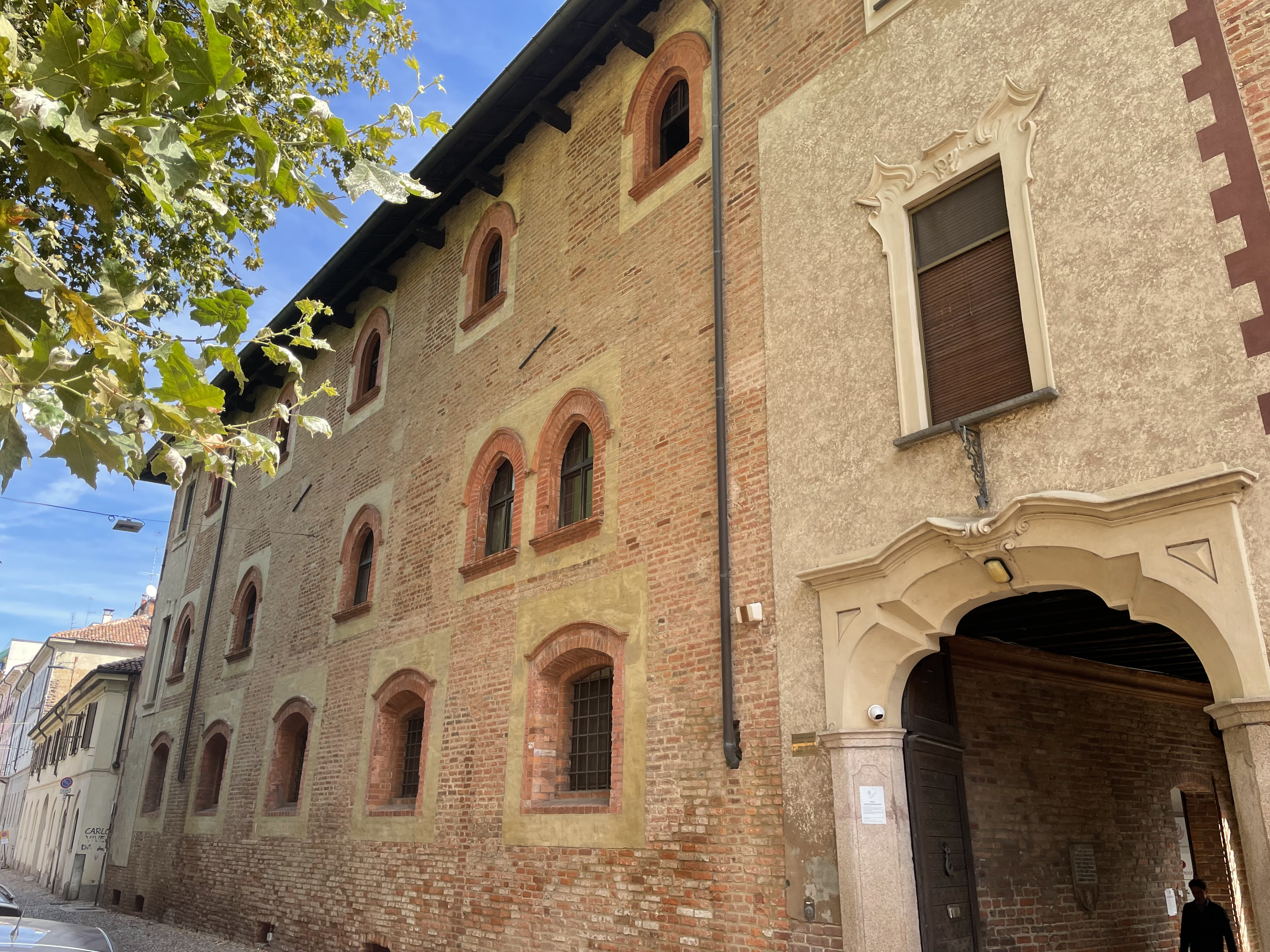
Collegio Castiglioni Brugnatelli, University of Pavia, Lombardy

Higher education in Italy is mainly covered by universities (Sistema di accreditamento degli studi universitari MIUR e verifica standard qualitativi ANVUR) and superior graduate schools, with almost no professional or vocational school following the secondary education. This is considered a weak point of the Italian post-secondary education. However, Italian system provides a few vocational schools and courses. There are two main vocational paths after having obtained a secondary degree: those courses called "Istruzione e Formazione Tecnica Superiore" (IFTS; "Higher technical training and education"), and the "Istituti Tecnici Superiori" (ITS; "Higher technical institutes").

The first ones, IFTS, were established in the late nineties and are managed on regional basis. An IFTS course lasts between 1 and 2 years and it is usually strictly connected with a secondary school specialised in the same field of studies. These courses were generally unsuccessfully: in 2007 on a number of 450.000 students with a secondary degree, only 2430 of them (0,54%) followed an IFTS course. The ITS, created in 2008, lasts 2 years and are managed by a secondary institute in collaboration with local universities or institutions.

In 2013, only 59 professional higher courses were available.

== Gallery ==
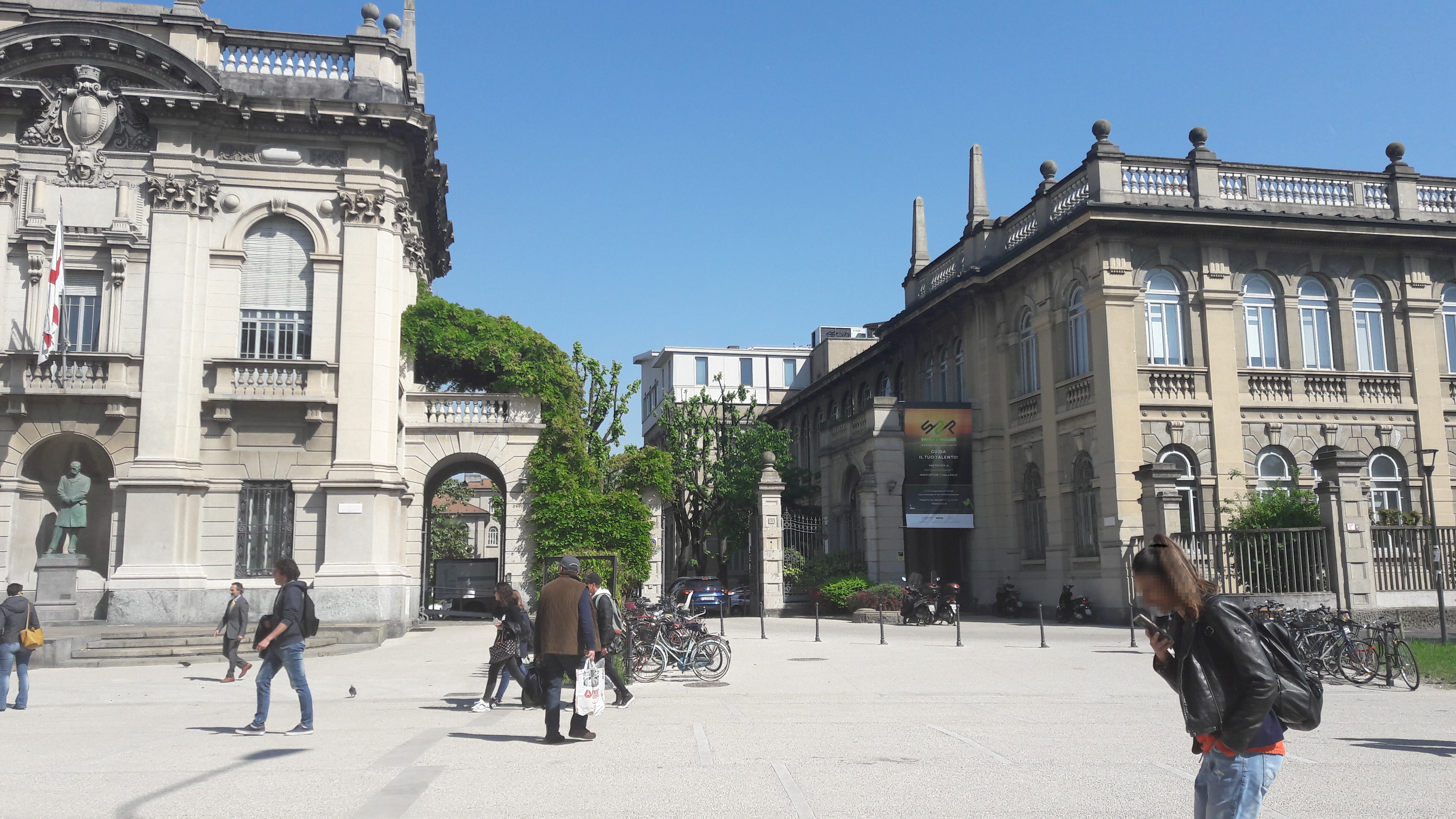
The Polytechnic University of Milan, Lombardy, is the city's oldest university, founded in 1863. It is the best university in Italy.

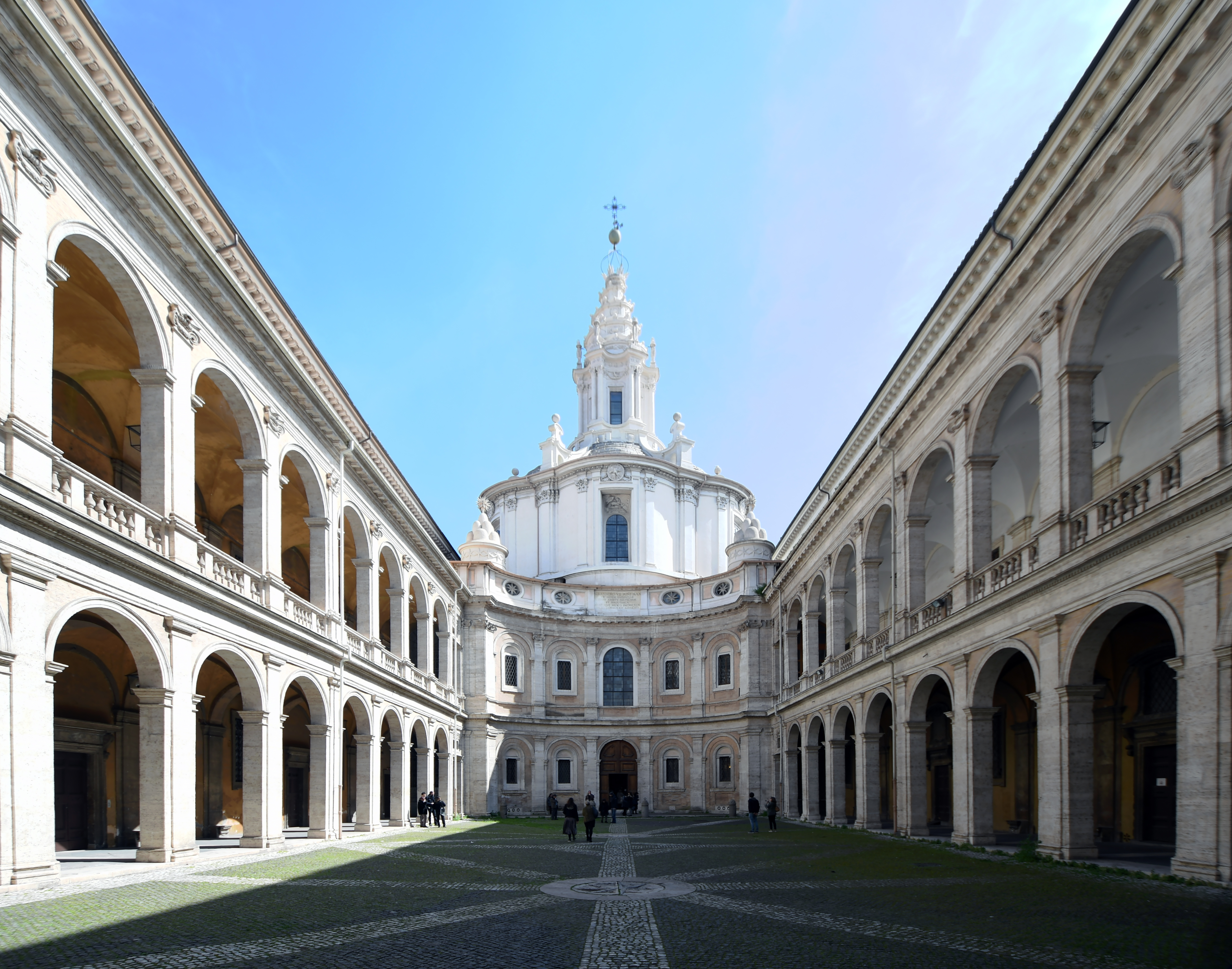
Sapienza University of Rome, Lazio. It was founded in 1303 and is as such one of the world's oldest universities, and with 122,000 students, it is the largest university in Europe.

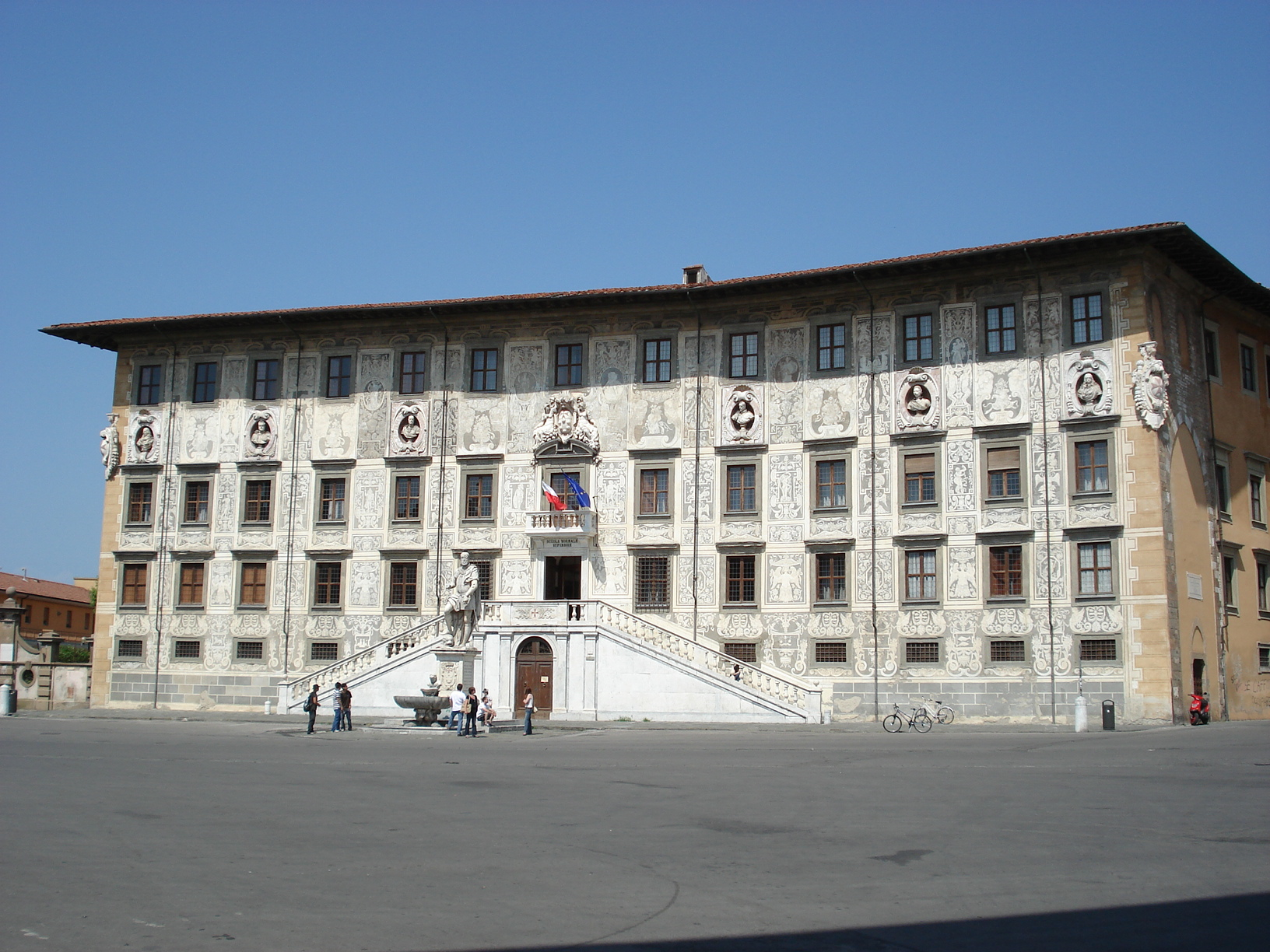
Palazzo della Carovana, Scuola Normale Superiore di Pisa main building, Tuscany. Currently attended by about 600 undergraduate and postgraduate (PhD) students. Together with the University of Pisa and Sant'Anna School of Advanced Studies, it is part of the Pisa University System.

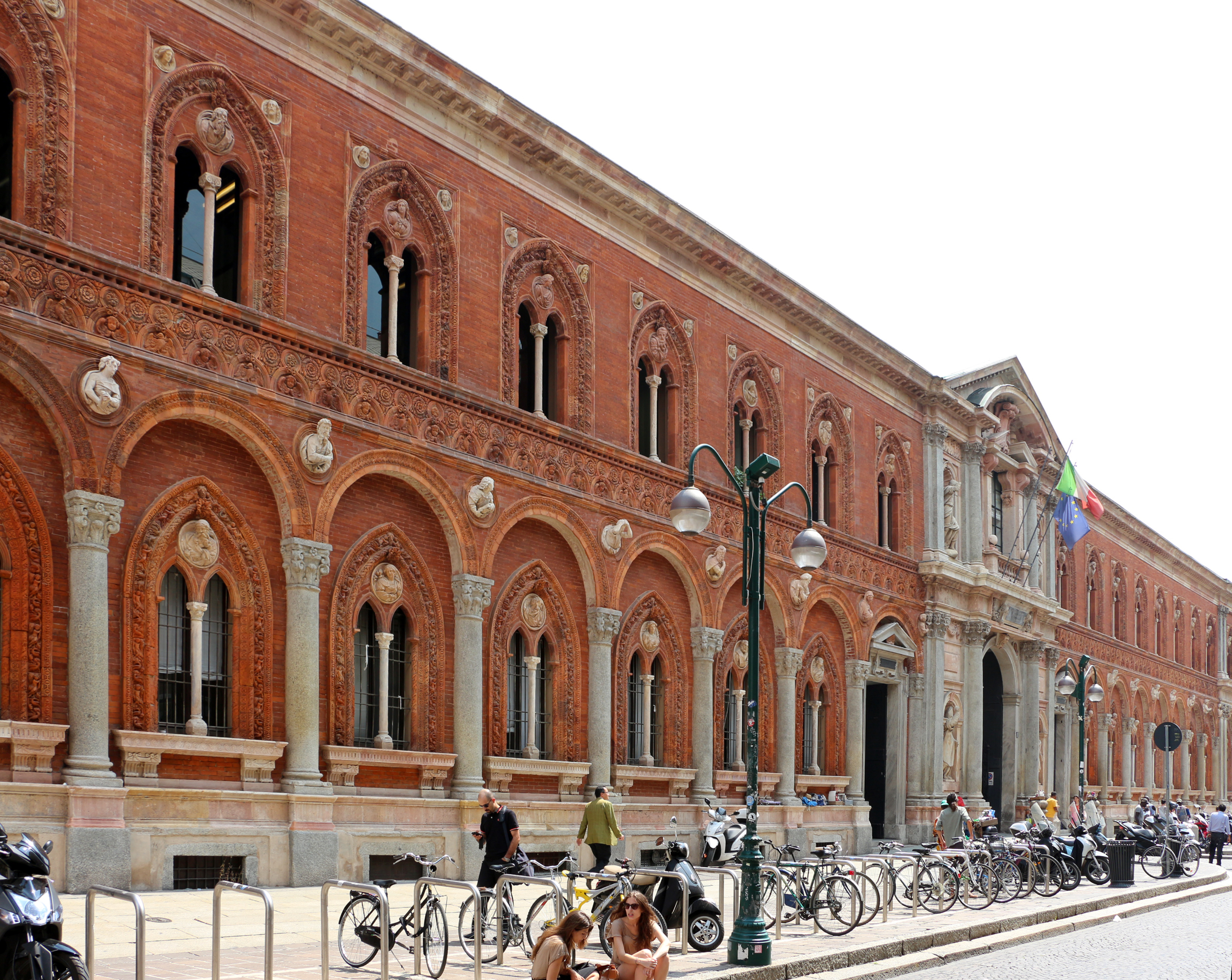
University of Milan, Lombardy. The 15th century Ca' Granda designed by the Renaissance period architect Filarete is the headquarters of the University of Milan.

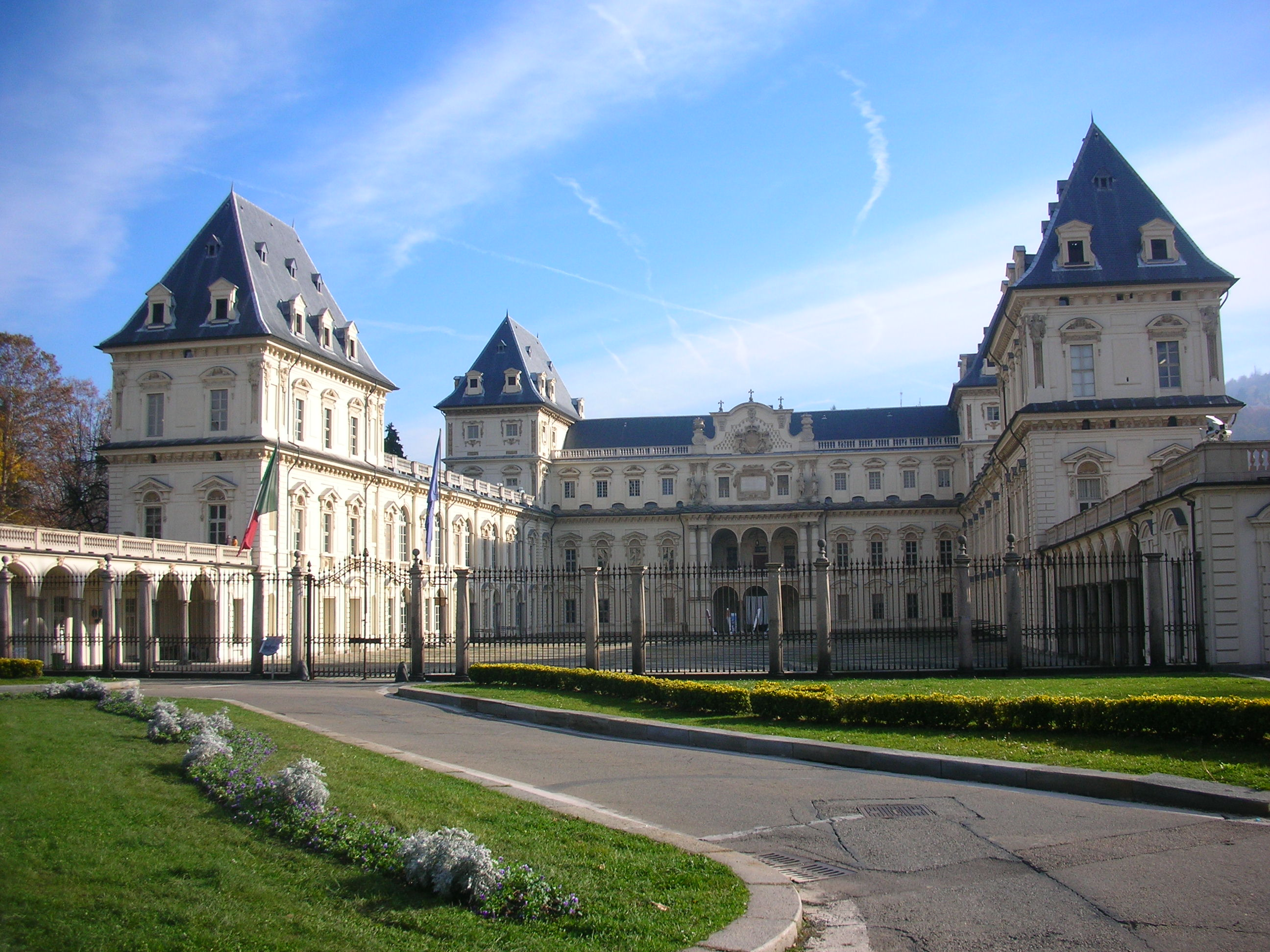
Polytechnic University of Turin, Piedmont. It is ranked (QS World University Rankings) 28th worldwide for Mechanical Engineering, 22nd for Petroleum Engineering, 21st for Architecture and is among the top 100 (52nd) engineering and technology universities in the world.

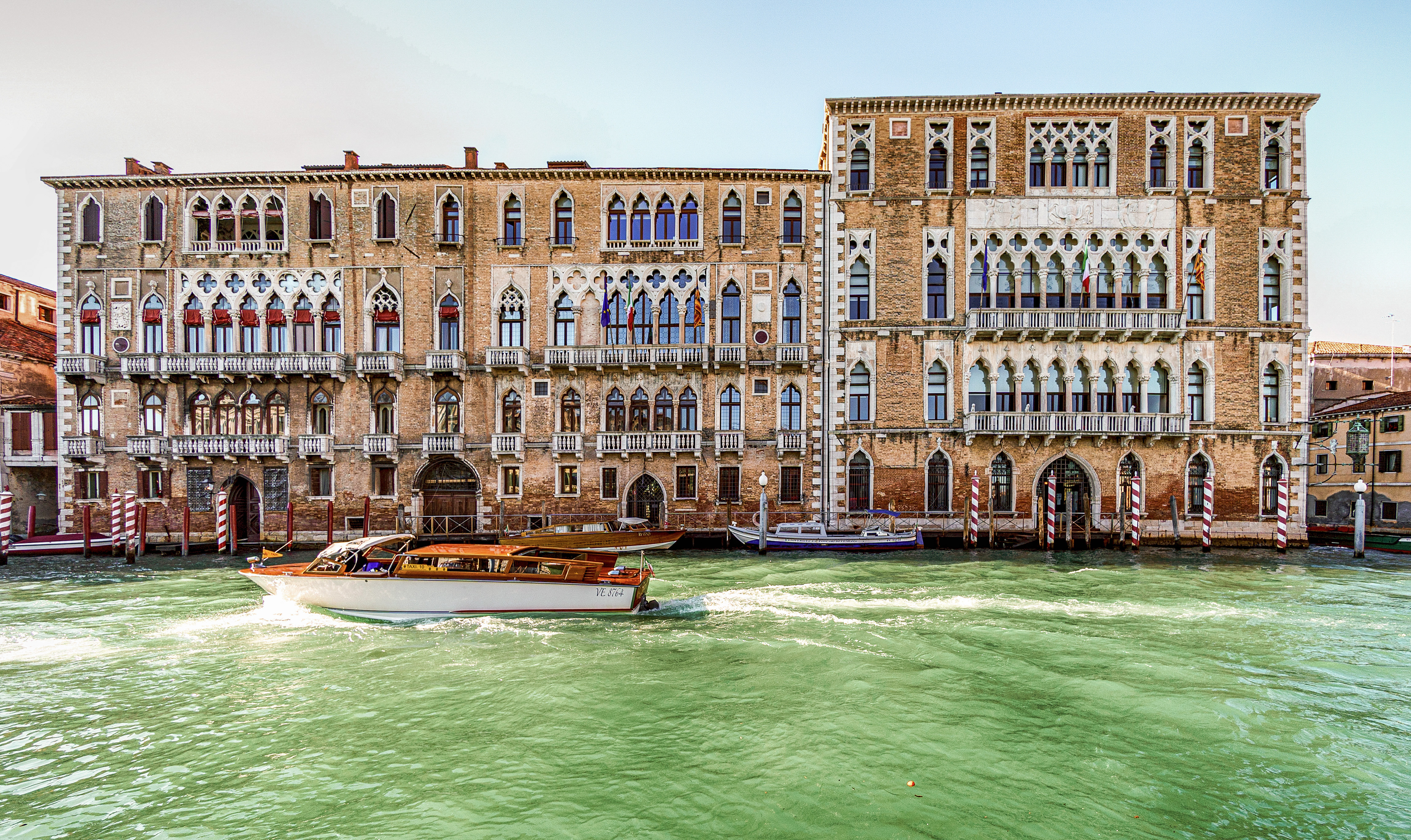
Ca' Foscari University of Venice, Veneto. Its teaching and research is centred around economics & business, humanities, and modern languages.

== See also ==
- Academic ranks in Italy
- Education in Italy
- List of universities in Italy
- Centro Universitario Sportivo Italiano
- Open access in Italy
