= Honours degree =

Variant of the undergraduate bachelor's degree

"Honours degree" has various meanings in the context of different degrees and education systems. Most commonly it refers to a variant of the undergraduate bachelor's degree containing a larger volume of material or a higher standard of study, or both, rather than an "ordinary", "general" or "pass" bachelor's degree. Honours degrees are sometimes indicated by "Hons" after the degree abbreviation, with various punctuation according to local custom, e.g. "BA (Hons)", "B.A., Hons", etc. In Canada, honours degrees may be indicated with an "H" preceding the degree abbreviation, e.g. "HBA" for Honours Bachelor of Arts or Honours Business Administration.

Examples of honours degree include the honors bachelor's degree in the United States; the bachelor's degree with honours in the United Kingdom, the Netherlands, Bangladesh, Hong Kong, and India; the honours bachelor's degree in Ireland; the bachelor with honours and bachelor honours degree in New Zealand; the bachelor with honours and honours bachelor's degree in Canada; and the bachelor honours degree in Australia. In South Africa the bachelor honours degree is a postgraduate degree that follows on from the completion of a bachelor's degree. The undergraduate master of arts degree awarded by the ancient universities of Scotland in place of the bachelor of arts may be awarded as an honours or non-honours degree; these are at the same level as equivalent bachelor's degrees. At master's level, the integrated master's degrees in British universities, which students enter at the same level as bachelor's degrees, are also honours degrees.

Many universities and colleges offer both honours and non-honours bachelor's degrees. In most countries where honours degrees are granted, they imply a higher level of achievement than a non-honours degree. In some countries (e.g. Australia), an honours degree may also involve a longer period of study than a non-honours degree. Students who complete all the requirements for a non-honours bachelor's degree but do not receive sufficient merit to be awarded an honours degree would normally be awarded a non-honours degree (sometimes known as a "pass", "general" or "ordinary" degree), although students who do not complete the requirements for an integrated master's honours degree may receive a bachelor's honours degree. In England, Northern Ireland and Wales, almost all bachelor's degrees are awarded as honours degrees; in contrast, honours degrees are rarely awarded in the United States.

The current British undergraduate degree classification system, with its division into first, upper and lower second, and third class honours, was developed in 1918 to distinguish between students on the basis of their academic achievement. The concept of an "honours" degree goes back much further than this, however, as there were examinations for honours in the original regulations of the University of London in 1839, and Nevil Maskelyne being recorded as taking a bachelor's degree with honours at Cambridge in 1754. Other countries and territories influenced by this system include Australia, Brunei, Canada, New Zealand, Malta, Singapore, South Africa, The Netherlands and Hong Kong.

== Europe ==
=== France ===
In France, the honours degree may correspond to the double licence diploma. It lasts the same length of time as the general bachelor's degree, but requires a higher level of study. It is generally offered in faculties with post-graduate degrees, whereas the double licence degree is mainly offered in undergraduate schools or colleges.

However, the honours degree, with its additional year after the bachelor's degree, corresponds more closely to the maîtrise diploma, a one-year master's degree in France. It corresponds to the first year (M1) of the french French master's degree.

=== Ireland ===
In the Republic of Ireland, honours bachelor's degrees are at level 8 of the National Framework of Qualifications and are Bologna first cycle degrees. They normally follow a three or four year (180-240 ECTS credits) course. The higher diploma may be awarded at the same level following a single year of study (60 ECTS credits) and is normally taken following an honours degree as a conversion course. Ordinary (non-honours) bachelor's degrees are at level 7 of the framework and take three years (180 ECTS credits) to complete.

=== Italy ===
In Italy, honours degrees can refer to the educational programs offered by superior graduate schools, where enrolment is often based on competitive entrance examinations. These institutions include the Scuola Normale Superiore and the Sant'Anna School of Advanced Studies in Pisa, the Scuola Galileiana di Studi Superiori in Padua, and the Sapienza School for Advanced Studies in Rome, among others. The master's honours program is equivalent to a master universitario di II livello.

=== Malta ===
A number of honours degrees are offered by the University of Malta and the Malta College of Arts, Science and Technology (MCAST), usually indicating an extra year of study with an undergraduate dissertation or a specialisation within a three-year programme.

=== Netherlands ===
In the Netherlands an honours degree can be gained by completing a bachelor's programme at a liberal arts "honours college", or by completing an "honours programme" of 30 ECTS credits in addition to a regular bachelor's programme. In most universities, honours programmes offer an interdisciplinary approach, blending teachings from social, natural and medical sciences, as well as knowledge from the fields of business and economics, art and law to all honours students. To gain access to this programme, prospective students must demonstrate outstanding academic performance and average a GPA of minimum 7.5/10 at the end of their studies to graduate with honours.

=== United Kingdom ===
==== England, Wales and Northern Ireland ====
In England, Wales and Northern Ireland, bachelor's degrees are normally awarded "with honours" after three years of study. The bachelor's degree with honours meets the requirements for a higher education qualification at level 6 of the Framework for Higher Education Qualifications in full, and is a first-cycle, end-of-cycle award on the Qualifications Framework of the European Higher Education Area established by the Bologna process. Students can be awarded an "ordinary" degree if they achieve the required learning outcomes over a smaller volume of studies than is required for an honours degree, e.g. only passing 300 credits rather than the 360 usually required for an honours degree. In addition to bachelor's degrees, four-year integrated master's degrees, which combine study at the bachelor's and master's levels, are also awarded with honours.

The University of Oxford does not award honours with its standard BA degree, but considers students who gain a third class degree or better to have "achieved honours status".

==== Scotland ====
In Scotland, all undergraduate degrees with honours must be of four-year duration. Students can choose to do the honours degree or the general (or pass/ordinary) degree. The first two years of both types of degrees are the same; however, after that, students who pursue the honours route will complete more advanced subjects and a dissertation in their last year, while students who choose to do the general degree will complete their third year at a lower level of specialisation.

Entry into the honours year in Scotland is generally not restricted and students are encouraged to take the honours year as the general/ordinary/pass degree does not provide the same level of depth and specialisation.

Students enrolling in the honours programme but failing to achieve the required academic merit for honours are awarded a pass/ordinary/general degree.

== Americas ==
=== Canada ===
In Canada there are two types of honours degree. Some universities, especially in Ontario, award an honours degree after four years of undergraduate study, instead of the three years of an ordinary bachelor's degree. Examples of universities awarding this degree include Queen's University, York University, and McMaster University. In those universities, honours degree students may undertake an honours thesis.

The University of Toronto previously had a similar differentiation between three- and four-year degrees, additionally imposing a higher CGPA minimum of 1.85 for the honours option instead of the 1.5 required for ordinary. Beginning with the Summer 2001 session, the three-year option was discontinued and is unavailable to new students. As of the 2022-23 academic year, students taking a four-year degree may still elect to receive an ordinary B.A. or B.Sc. if they graduate with a CGPA between 1.5 and 1.84.

Some other universities, such as McGill University, University of Ottawa, University of Western Ontario, University of British Columbia, Concordia University and Dalhousie University, require students to undertake an honours project in order to graduate with honours (Latin: cum honore, French: spécialisé). In those universities, honours programmes also require a higher degree of specialization than non-honours "major" degrees, including a supervised research project or thesis, and students are required to maintain a high academic standard.

Thesis-based honours degrees prepare students for research-based postgraduate study, and may sometimes allow direct entry into doctoral programmes. A four-year bachelor's degree is required for entry to most postgraduate courses in Canada.

=== United States ===
In the United States, many honours degrees (or honors degrees in US spelling) require a thesis or project work beyond that needed for the normal bachelor's programme. Honours programmes in the US are taken alongside the rest of the degree and often have a minimum GPA requirement for entry or college-entrance exam score, which can vary between institutions. In rare cases, a student may petition to write one even if they do not meet the normal requirements. Some institutions do not have a separate honours programme, but instead refer to bachelor's degrees awarded with Latin honours, which may be based either on GPA or class position, as honours degrees.

== Asia ==
=== Hong Kong ===
Universities in Hong Kong have four degree classifications: first class, second class upper division (or second class division one/I), second class lower division (or second class division two/II), and third class. Bachelor's degrees issued in Hong Kong are honour degrees and are abbreviated as BSc (Hons), BEng (Hons), BBA (Hons), etc. The University of Hong Kong, Hong Kong University of Science and Technology, and the Hong Kong Polytechnic University follow a GPA scale of 4.3, and The Chinese University of Hong Kong follows a GPA scale of 4.0.

== Oceania ==
=== Australia ===
The consecutive Australian with-honours degree is usually a one to two-year research programme, after the completion of a bachelor's degree in the same field. It can also be started as a concurrent programme in the fourth year of a four-year bachelor's degree. It is generally considered a postgraduate year because a bachelor's degree can be completed without it. Entry to an honours degree generally requires proven abilities and a distinction (75% or greater average) in the relevant area or the final-year units.

In the regular (standalone) honours, the student will complete selected courses within a supervised programme of research (field, laboratory, or secondary), and produce a long, high-quality research thesis. This is usually accompanied by a seminar or presentation of the findings to an academic board for marking. In the case of a quality thesis being produced, its findings may be published in a peer-reviewed academic journal or similar publication. Students receiving high marks in their honours programme have the option of continuing to candidature of a doctoral programme, such as Doctor of Philosophy, without having to complete a master's degree. Honours can be awarded at up to five levels, depending on the awarding institution, and may be indicated in post-nominals in general as "(Hons)":

- Honours, Class 1, with a University Medal, sometimes indicated in post-nominals as (Hons IM), (Hons 1M), or (H1M)
- Honours, Class 1, sometimes indicated in post-nominals as (Hons I), (Hons 1), or (H1)
- Honours, Class 2, Division 1 (or Division A), sometimes indicated in post-nominals as (Hons II), (Hons II(1)), (Hons 2(1)), (H21), (Hons IIA), (Hons 2A), or (H2A)
- Honours, Class 2, Division 2 (or Division B), sometimes indicated in post-nominals as (Hons II), (Hons II(2)), (Hons 2(2)), (H22), (Hons IIB), (Hons 2B), or (H2B)
- Honours, Class 3, sometimes indicated in post-nominals as (Hons III), (Hons 3), or (H3)

At the master's level, Monash University has a Master of Business with Honours programme in which students can be awarded an honours classification upon completion.

Macquarie University has phased out the honours degree in favour of the Master of Research degree for most fields, although it still offers honours degrees in psychology and engineering as honours degrees are required for accreditation in these fields.

=== New Zealand ===
The bachelor honours degree is a separate level on the New Zealand Qualifications Framework from the bachelor's degree without honours, as in Australia and Scotland. It may either be a 4-year (480 credit) course or a single-year (120 credit) course following on from a bachelor's degree, and it prepares students for postgraduate study. Bachelor's degrees issued are abbreviated as B.Com. (Hons), B.Sc. (Hons), etc. The award of honours recognises outstanding achievement, meritorious achievement or a pass; these may be termed first class honours, second class honours: first or second divisions, and third class honours.

== Africa ==
=== South Africa ===
In South Africa, the Honours Degree is a one-year program, typically specialising in a single subject; the degree title may correspond - e.g. BSc. Honours in mathematics, B.A. Hons. (English). Entering students will be graduates of the corresponding 3-year bachelor's degree; intake into the Honours degree is often highly selective. The degree is at level 8 on the National Qualifications Framework of the South African Qualifications Authority; Honours is (usually) required to register for a Masters. The programme typically consists of taught courses, coupled with a research component (at least 25% of the degree).

== See also ==
- Bachelor's degree
- Master's degree
- Doctorate
- Doctor of Philosophy (PhD)
- Latin honors
