= PSAV =

The initials PSAV may be used for

- Prostate-specific antigen velocity, rate of change of PSA
- Polo Sant'Anna Valdera, a research centre in Pisa, Italy
