= Pierdomenico =

Pierdomenico is a both surname and masculine given name of Italian origin, a combination of the names Pier, a form of Peter, and Domenico, which means 'lordly'. Notable people with the name include:

== Surname ==
- Germano Pierdomenico (born 1967), Italian former professional racing cyclist

== Given name ==
- Pierdomenico Baccalario (born 1974), Italian author
- Pierdomenico Perata (born 1962), Italian physiologist
