= Raffaele De Caterina =

Italian cardiologist

Raffaele De Caterina serves as a Cardiology Professor at the University of Pisa in Italy. Additionally, he holds the position of Director in the Cardiology Division at Pisa University Hospital. De Caterina has authored 750 articles that have undergone peer review and are cataloged in PubMed.

== Education ==
Raffaele De Caterina obtained his medical degree from the University of Pisa, Italy, and proceeded to further his education there, gaining postgraduate qualifications in Pulmonary Medicine, Cardiology, Hematology, and Nuclear Medicine. In 1981, he was also awarded a PhD in Cardiovascular Medicine from the Scuola Superiore Sant'Anna in Pisa.

== Research & career ==
Thrombosis, atherosclerosis, cardiovascular pharmacology, atrial fibrillation, and the pathogenesis of coronary artery disease are among the key scientific interests of Raffaele De Caterina. He has conducted research on antiplatelet agents and anticoagulants, in their use in cardiovascular therapy.

With more than 40 years of professional experience, Raffaele De Caterina is Professor of Cardiology at the University of Pisa, Italy. Prior to obtaining his current role, he was a Lecturer on Medicine at the Brigham and Women's Hospital, Harvard Medical School.

== Honors ==
Raffaele De Caterina is a Fellow of the European Society of Cardiology, the Italian Society of Cardiology and the Italian Association of Hospital Cardiologists (ANMCO).

== Selected publications ==
- Gentile F, Castiglione V, De Caterina R. Coronary Artery Anomalies. Circulation. 2021;144:983–996.
- De Caterina R, Ageno W, Agnelli G, et al.: The Non-Vitamin K Antagonist Oral Anticoagulants in Heart Disease: Section V-Special Situations. Thromb Haemost 2019; 119: 14-38.
- De Caterina R, Husted S, Wallentin L, et al.: Oral anticoagulants in coronary heart disease (Section IV). Position paper of the ESC Working Group on Thrombosis - Task Force on Anticoagulants in Heart Disease. Thromb Haemost 2016; 115: 685-711.
- De Caterina R, Husted S, Wallentin L, et al.: General mechanisms of coagulation and targets of anticoagulants (Section I). Position Paper of the ESC Working Group on Thrombosis—Task Force on Anticoagulants in Heart Disease. Thromb Haemost 2013; 109: 569-79.
- De Caterina R, Husted S, Wallentin L, et al.: Vitamin K antagonists in heart disease: current status and perspectives (Section III). Position paper of the ESC Working Group on Thrombosis—Task Force on Anticoagulants in Heart Disease. Thromb Haemost 2013; 110: 1087-107.
- De Caterina R: n–3 Fatty Acids in Cardiovascular Disease. N Engl J Med 2011; 364:2439-2450.
