= Nicoletta Batini =

Italian economist

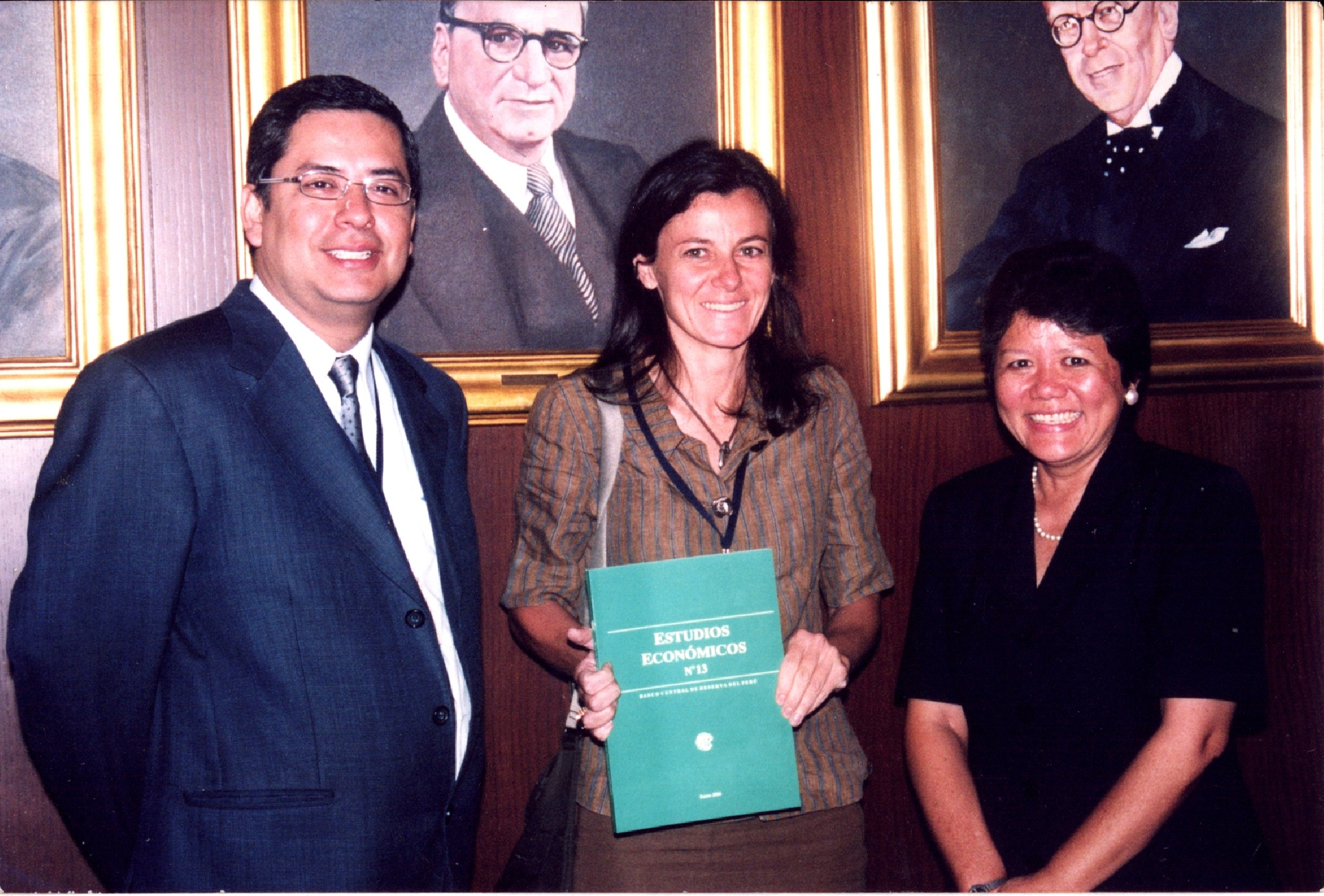
- Born: 15 April 1970 (age 56)
- Education: Sant'Anna School of Advanced Studies (Laurea in Economia e Commercio, Ph.D), University of Birmingham (M.Soc.Sc), University of Oxford (Ph.D.)
- Occupation: Economist
- Years active: 1997–present

Nicoletta Batini (born 15 April 1970) is an Italian economist, notable as a scholar of innovative monetary and fiscal policy practices. During the crisis, she pioneered the IMF work exposing the dangers of excessive fiscal austerity and designed ways to consolidate public debt successfully during phases of financial deleveraging. Since 2003 at the International Monetary Fund, she has served as Advisor of the Bank of England's Monetary Policy Committee between 2000-2003 and was Professor of Economics at the University of Surrey (2007-2012), Director of the International Economics and Policy office of the Department of the Treasury of Italy's Ministero dell’Economia e delle Finanze (MEF) between 2013-2015, Lead Evaluator of the IMF’s Independent Evaluation Office Independent Evaluation Office (IEO) between 2019-2023. She is currently Senior Adviser of the Sveriges Riksbank Sveriges Riksbank. Batini's fields of expertise include monetary policy, public finance, open economy macroeconomics, labour economics, economics of transport, energy and environmental economics, and economic modelling. She has handled extensive consultancy roles in the public sector in advanced and emerging market countries, including in the area of the economics of sea transport and international trade. She holds a Ph.D. in international finance from the Scuola Superiore S. Anna and a Ph.D. in monetary economics from the University of Oxford.

== Early life and education ==
Batini obtained a Laurea Degree in Economics and Business from the Sant'Anna School of Advanced Studies in Pisa with a thesis on the comparative analysis of the micro-economic impact of antitrust regulations on the international shipping of bulk goods, a M.Soc.Sc. from the University of Birmingham, a Ph.D. degree in Economics from the University of Oxford, and a second Ph.D., in International Finance, from the Sant'Anna School of Advanced Studies. She has been awarded important grants both from the Economic and Social Research Council in the United Kingdom, the University of Pisa, and Nemetria.

== Career ==
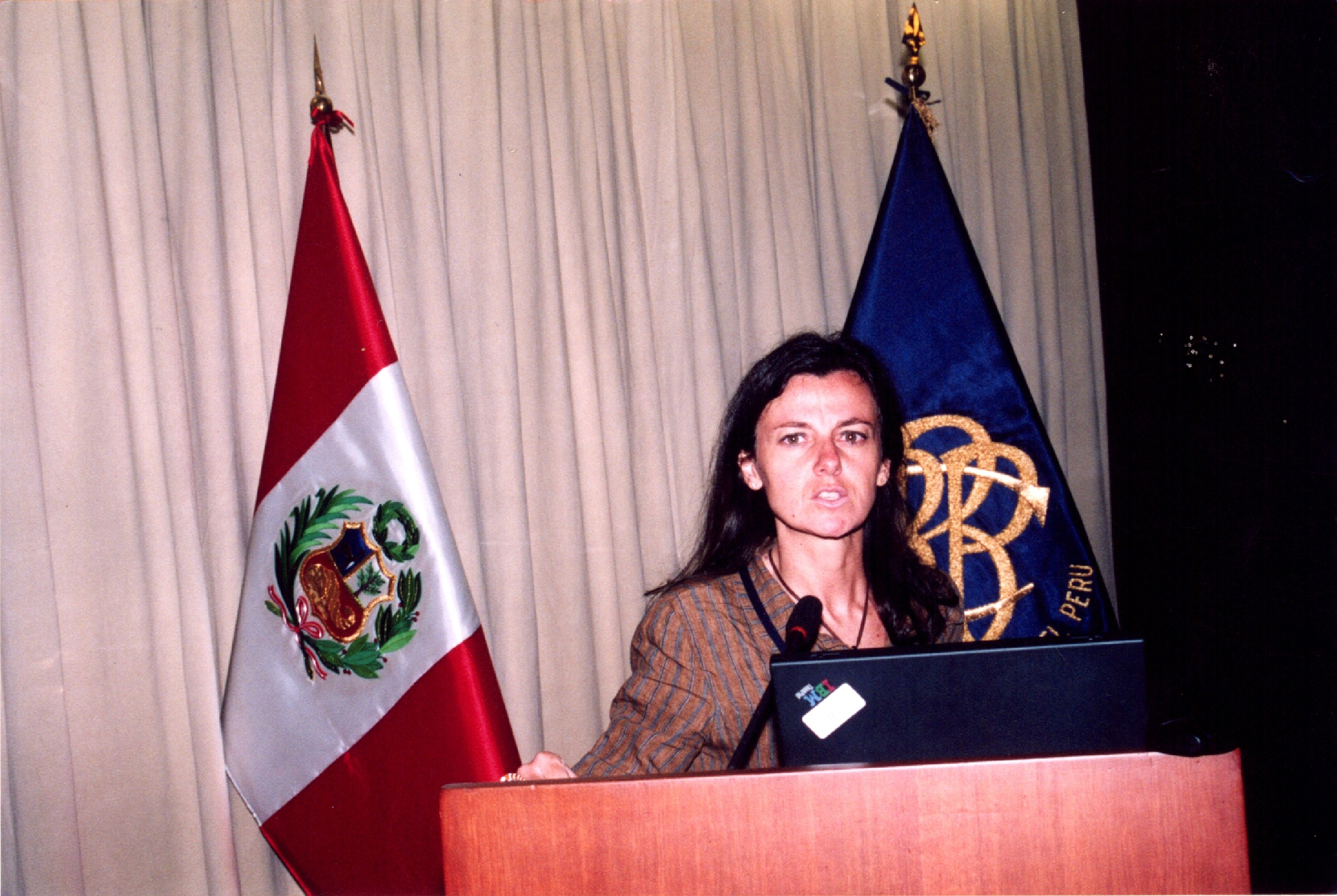
Batini at the Central Reserve Bank of Peru in 2006 launching a book on dollarization

After earning her second Ph.D., she began her career at the Bank of England as an Economist from 1997 to 1999 in Monetary Policy Analysis. In 2000, Batini was recruited by Professor Willem Buiter and Dame DeAnne Julius to become a Research Adviser of the Bank of England's Monetary Policy Committee and a founding member of the Monetary Policy Committee Unit. Her innovative ideas and publications on monetary policy practices and strategies, were launched at prestigious international conferences of the National Bureau of Economic Research, the Federal Reserve and the European Central Bank, she acted as consultant for the Reserve Bank of New Zealand, the South African Reserve Bank, the Bank of Canada and the Czech National Bank, among others, for which she became External Member of the Research Committee in 2001 –a position she held for four consecutive terms until 2011. In 2002 she was invited as Visiting Researcher by the Directorate for Research of the European Central Bank. Her work during that time is cited by the ECB as one of those having influenced the bank's decision to change monetary policy strategy in 2003.

In 2003 she went on to work as a Senior Economist with the Research Department of the International Monetary Fund in Washington, D.C. where she conducted pioneering work on global imbalances, inflation targeting in emerging markets and the macroeconomic impact of the world's demographic change, all of which had lasting effects on the Fund's policy approach towards advice and conditionality toward its members.

From 2004 until 2013, she held a succession of posts in the IMF, including Resident Representative in Peru between 2006 and 2008. During these years, she studied ways to boost export competitiveness and reform the National System of Public Investment (SNIP) to improve the provision of public services in health, education and road infrastructure and fight income inequality, and measures to render the regulation of public-private partnerships aimed at logistic and transport infrastructure more effective and sound. She also co-authored with the Central Reserve Bank of Peru a novel analysis on measures to foster de-dollarization through structural reforms.

In 2007 she was appointed Professor of Economics at the University of Surrey in the United Kingdom, a post she held until 2012.

In early 2008, she returned to Washington, D.C. to work on Chile but was co-opted in late 2008 to work on Canada and the United States, leading advanced missions, due to the 2008 financial crisis. Her work focused intensely on the sustainability of U.S. public finances, the countercyclical impact of the state balanced-budget rules and the employment and domestic demand impact of NAFTAs’ automotive sector and bailouts with a focus on trends in international transport and logistics and the impact of swings in the USD/CAD bilateral onto the global automotive value chain. As the crisis moved to Europe, she also moved to the European Department with assignments on countries in the Nord Range, and Israel, and worked actively within EUR's Analytical Group in charge of studying macro prudential rules and supervision of European Global Systemic International Financial Institutions (SIFIs), notably Nordea and Danske Bank. Batini was then made a member of the Editorial Board of the IMF's prestigious Finance & Development magazine. Between 2011 and 2012, Batini was Alternate President of the IMF's Staff Association Committee (SAC)—the Fund's Trade Union. She is interviewed repeatedly by the media for her seminal work –the first to forcefully challenge, and eventually steer the Fund's orthodox view on austerity—on the dangers of excessive fiscal austerity and ways to consolidate public debt successfully through gradualism to shelter growth.

In 2013, she took leave from the IMF to become a Director of the Treasury Department of the Ministry of Economics and Finance (MEF) in Italy, leading the office in charge of political and international economies. Her portfolio included the Organisation for Economic Co-operation and Development (particularly the OECD's Working Party 3 and of the Economic Development Review Committee (ERDC)), the G-20 including dossier G7/G8, Bruegel (for which exercises the role of Sherpa to the Director General of the Treasury) and the Bellagio Group. While in Rome, Batini taught analytic methods of early warning and macroeconomic risk management at the High School of the Presidency of the Council of Ministers.

She returned to the IMF in late 2015, where she is now Lead Evaluator of the Fund's Independent Evaluation Office. Her work on the macroeconomic links between private and public debt has featured prominently in the press after publication in the Fund's Fiscal Monitor of October 2016. Batini is currently researching economic policy reforms to make the agri-food sector sustainable. She suggests making a paradigm shift towards a more sustainable system to achieve macroeconomic gains, such as carbon emission reductions, better public health, and more farm industry jobs. Her new book “The Economics of Sustainable Food: Smart Policies for People and the Planet” is forthcoming in early 2021. She has worked on several real-world applications of these proposals, for example in the case of Denmark and France

== Personal life ==
While at Oxford, Batini was an active member of the Oxford Civil Liberties Society, and remains today an active member of St. Antony's College Alumni and of the Ex-Allievi della Scuola S. Anna. She has been a Key Volunteer for 'Catholic Agency for Overseas Development' CAFOD. A polyglot, she has travelled extensively. She has two (twin) children who are American-Italian citizens and were born in Washington D.C. in 2009.

== Academic activities and publications ==
=== IMF Publications ===
Nicoletta Batini's academic activities and publications have focused on macroeconomic forecasting and monetary economics, according to the IMF. Nicoletta Batini has published or co-published a total of 19 IMF articles between June 1, 2004 and February 27, 2019. In these articles, she mainly elaborated the international macro economy and national finance related issues, involving population economics, labor economics, environmental economics, etc. Here is a list of IMF Books and Working Papers with Nicoletta Batini:

1. Building Back Better: How Big Are Green Spending Multipliers?, Working Paper No. 2021/087, 19 March 2021
2. Facing the Global Financial Cycle: What Role for Policy, Working Paper No. 2021/034, 12 February 2021
3. Climate Mitigation Policy in Denmark: A Prototype for Other Countries, Working Paper No. 2020/235, 12 November 2020
4. Reducing Risk While Sharing It: A Fiscal Recipe for The EU at the Time of COVID-19, Working Paper No. 20/181, 4 September 2020
5. How Loose, How Tight? A Measure of Monetary and Fiscal Stance for the Euro Area, Working Paper No. 20/86, 5 June 2020
6. Macroeconomic Gains from Reforming the Agri-Food Sector: The Case of France, Working Paper No. 19/41, 26 February 2019
7. The Refugee Surge in Europe: Economic Challenges, Staff Discussion Notes No. 16/2, 20 January 2016
8. Fiscal Multipliers: Size, Determinants, and Use in Macroeconomic Projections, Technical Notes and Manuals No. 2014/4, 2 October 2014
9. A Simple Method to Compute Fiscal Multipliers, Working Paper No. 14/93, 9 June 2014
10. Successful Austerity in the United States, Europe and Japan, Working Paper No. 12/190, 1 July 2012
11. An Analysis of U.S. Fiscal and Generational Imbalances: Who Will Pay and How?, Working Paper No. 11/72, 1 April 2011
12. Interpreting Currency Movements During the Crisis: What's the Role of Interest Rate Differentials?, Working Paper No. 11/14, 1 January 2011
13. Informal Labour and Credit Markets: A Survey, Working Paper No. 10/42, 1 February 2010
14. "What Should Inflation Targeting Countries Do When Oil Prices Rise and Drop Fast?", Working Paper No. 09/101, 1 May 2009
15. Global Imbalances: The Role of Non-TradableTotal Factor Productivity in Advanced Economies, Working Paper No. 09/63, 1 March 2009
16. Monetary and Fiscal Rules in an Emerging Small Open Economy, Working Paper No. 09/22, 1 January 2009
17. The Global Impact of Demographic Change, Working Paper No. 06/9, 1 January 2006
18. The Domestic and Global Impact of Japan's Policies for Growth, Working Paper No. 05/209, 1 November 2005
19. Achieving and Maintaining Price Stability in Nigeria, Working Paper No. 04/97, 1 June 2004

=== Publications in Journals ===
Nicoletta Batini's academic activities and publications have focused on macroeconomic forecasting and monetary economics, according to the IMF. Nicoletta Batini has published or co-published a total of 18 journal articles between 1999 and February 27, 2019. In these articles, Nicoletta Batini made an in-depth study of the inflation problem in the Eurozone and Western countries. Meanwhile, Nicoletta Batini was keen to study the degree of inflation and the issue of economic balance, that is, how to ensure the sustainable development of the economy under the condition of inflation. These articles relate to macroeconomics, monetary economics, fiscal economics and so on. Here is a list of IMF Books and Working Papers with Nicoletta Batini:

1. “Fiscal Buffers, Private Debt and Stagnation: The Good, The Bad and the Ugly” Journal of Macroeconomics, 2018. (with G. Melina and S. Villa).
2. “Inflation Targeting During Asset and Commodity Price Booms”, 2010, Oxford Review Economic Policy, 26(1):15-35.
3. “Monetary Rules in Emerging Economies with Financial Market Imperfections”, 2010, in International Dimensions of Monetary Policy, ed. J. Galí and M. Gertler (with P.Levine and J. Pearlman).
4. “Rebalancing Imbalances through Growth”, 2007, IMF Staff Papers, (with P. Cova, M Pisani and A. Rebucci).
5. "Optimal Exchange Rate Stabilization in a Dollarized Economy with Inflation Targets," Computing in Economics and Finance, 2006 148, Society for Computational Economics. (with P/ Levine and J. Pearlman).
6. “Euro Area Inflation Persistence”, 2006, Empirical Economics, 31(4): 977-1002.
7. "Under What Conditions Can Inflation Targeting Be Adopted? The Experience of Emerging Markets," Central Banking, Analysis, and Economic Policies Book Series, in: F. S. Mishkin, K. Schmidt-Hebbel and N. Loayza (eds.), Monetary Policy under Inflation Targeting, edition 1, volume 11, chapter 12, pages 467-506 Central Bank of Chile (with D. Laxton).
8. “An Open-Economy New Keynesian Phillips Curve for the UK”, 2005, Journal of Monetary Economics, 52(6): 1061-1071 (with B. Jackson and S. Nickell).
9. “Robust Control Monetary Policy Rules to Shield against Indeterminacy”, 2006, Journal of Economic Dynamics and Control, 30(9-10): 1491-1526 (with A, Justiniano, P. Levine and J. Pearlman).
10. “Measuring the UK Short-Run NAIRU”, 2006, Oxford Economic Papers, 58(1): 28-49 (with J. Greenslade).
11. "U.K.’s Rocky Road to Stability", 2005, in Inflation: Research and Outlook, Frank Columbus (ed.), New York. Also published as Federal Reserve Bank of St. Louis Working Paper No. 2005-020A (with E. Nelson).
12. “The New-Keynesian Phillips Curve When Inflation Is Non-Stationary: The Case of Canada”, 2005, in Issues in Inflation Targeting, Bank of Canada (with B. Barkbu).
13. “Monetary Policy Rules for Open Economies”, 2003, Journal of Economic Dynamics and Control, 27(11-12): 2059 – 2094 (with R. Harrison and S. P.Millard).
14. “Hybrid Price Level and Inflation Targeting Regimes”, 2003, Journal of Money, Credit and Banking, 35(3): 282-300 (with A. Yates).
15. “A Dynamic Monetary Condition Index for the UK”, 2002, Journal of Policy Modelling, 24(3), 257-281 (with K. Turnbull).
16. “The Lag from Monetary Policy Actions to Inflation: Friedman Revisited”, 2001, International Finance, 4(3), 381-400 (with E. Nelson).
17. “Optimal Horizons for Inflation Targeting”, 2000, Journal of Economic Dynamics and Control, March 2000, 891-910 (with E. Nelson).
18. “Forward-Looking Rules For Monetary Policy”, in J. B. Taylor (ed.), 1999, Monetary Policy Rules, University of Chicago Press (with A.G. Haldane).
