= Dottorato di ricerca =

Highest Italian academic degree

The dottorato di ricerca (from Italian "research doctorate") is the highest academic qualification in Italy, equivalent to the Doctor of Philosophy.

Those who have obtained this degree are referred to as "dottore di ricerca" or "Ph.D.", and not as "Doctor", which is instead the title conferred to laureati (bachelor's degree). In common usage, however, the title is reserved for holders of a laurea magistrale, equivalent to a master's degree.

== History and admission ==
The dottorato is a relatively recent addition to the Italian academic landscape, having been instituted in 1980.

According to the Bologna Process, Italy fits the framework since the adoption, in 1999, of the so-called 3+2 system. The first degree is the Laurea that can be achieved after three years of studies. Selected students can then complete their studies in the following step: two additional years of specialization which leads to the Laurea Magistrale.

After 1999, the Laurea corresponds to a Bachelor's Degree while the "Laurea Magistrale" corresponds to a Master's Degree. Only the Laurea Magistrale grants access to third cycle programmes (Post-MA degrees, Doctorates or Specializing schools), that last 2 to 5 years (usually completing a PhD takes 3 years). However, it is now established that there is just a unique five-year degree Laurea Magistrale a ciclo unico (Single cycle master's degree) for programmes such as Law (Facoltà di Giurisprudenza), Arts (Accademia di Belle Arti), Music (Conservatorio di Musica) and a few others, and six-years degree for Medicine and Surgery (Medicina e Chirurgia) and Dentistry (Odontoiatria e Protesi Dentaria). The title for MA/MSc/MFA/MD/MJur/MEd graduate students is dottore (abbreviation in dott./dott.ssa or dr., meaning Doctor). This title is not to be confused with the PhD and Post-MA graduates, whose title is Dottore di Ricerca (Research Doctor or Philosophy Doctor).

The Italian Master's Degree should not be confused with Italian "Masters" that are one-year specialistic courses which guarantee a more practical education but do not give access to further levels of studies (they can be considered similar to Postgraduate diplomas).

== Superior Graduate Schools in Italy ==
The first institution in Italy to create a doctoral program (PhD) was Scuola Normale Superiore di Pisa in 1927 under the historic name "Diploma di Perfezionamento". Further, the research doctorates or PhD (Italian: Dottorato di ricerca) in Italy were introduced with law and Presidential Decree in 1980 (Law of February 21, 1980, No. 28 and the Presidential Decree No. 382 of 11 July 1980), referring to the reform of academic teaching, training and experimentation in organisation and teaching methods.

Hence, the Superior Graduate Schools in Italy (Grandes écoles) (Italian: Scuola Superiore Universitaria), also called Schools of Excellence (Italian: Scuole di Eccellenza) such as Scuola Normale Superiore di Pisa and Sant'Anna School of Advanced Studies still keep their reputed historical "Diploma di Perfezionamento" PhD title by law and MIUR Decree.

The Superior Graduate Schools in Italy or Scuola superiore universitaria have “Diplomi di Perfezionamento “, which are equivalent to “Dottorati di Ricerca” (PhD).:

- Diplomi di Perfezionamento: Scuola Normale Superiore, Pisa - Legge n. 308/1986
- Diplomi di Perfezionamento: Scuola Superiore di Studi Universitari e di Perfezionamento “SANT’ANNA”, Pisa - Legge N. 41/1987
- Diplomi di Perfezionamento: Alta Scuola Europea di Scienze Religiose Fondazione per le Scienze Religiose Giovanni XXIII, Bologna -D.M. Murst 19.10.1999
- Diplomi di Perfezionamento: Scuola Internazionale di Alti Studi della Cultura Fondazione collegio s. Carlo, Modena - D.M. Murst 4.5.1998
- Diplomi di Perfezionamento: Societa’ Internazionale per lo studio del Medioevo Latino, Fondazione Ezio Franceschini, Firenze - D.M. 3.4.2001
- Diplomi di Perfezionamento: Istituto Nazionale di Studi sul Rinascimento, Firenze - D.M. 9.10.2001
- Diplomi di Perfezionamento: Scuola Internazionale Superiore di Studi Avanzati (SISSA). Trieste - D.M. Murst 24.2.1993
- Diploma di Doctor Philosophiae (PhD): European University Institute (Istituto Universitario Europeo), Fiesole/Firenze - Legge N. 352/1986
- Diplomi di Perfezionamento: Istituto di scienze farmacologiche “Mario Negri”, Milano - D.M. MIUR 11.11.2008
- Dottorato in Studi Storici: Università degli Studi S. Marino - D.M. Murst 11.6.1990 and scambio Note 16.7.1999 in vigore dal 28.11.2000
- Dottorato in Ingegneria Gestionale: Università degli Studi S. Marino - D.M. Murst 11.6.1990 and scambio Note 16.7.1999 in vigore dal 28.11.2000
- Diplomi di Perfezionamento: Fondazione Internazionale per gli studi superiori di Architettura, Scuola Superiore Europea di Architettura Urbana - Napoli - D.M. MIUR 14 Luglio 2006
