= Polo Sant'Anna Valdera =

Coordinates: 43°43′13.23″N 10°24′10.34″E

Polo Sant'Anna Valdera (PSAV) is a research centre of Sant'Anna School of Advanced Studies in Pisa based in Pontedera (Pisa). It was inaugurated in 2002 thanks to the interest of the then president of Piaggio Giovanni Alberto Agnelli. The property is housed in converted sheds donated by Piaggio.

Polo Sant'Anna Valdera (PSAV) is one step in growth for the Sant'Anna School of Advanced Studies who wanted to strengthen its research capacities and in essence contribute to the industrial process of Piaggio. PSAV's mission is to enhance research in the fields of science and technology policies and to spur development of the region through its services to businesses.

The main research is in the fields of robotics, bioengineering, biotechnology, precision engineering, computing and virtual environments.

Polo Sant'Anna Valdera (PSAV) has 25 offices, 4 classrooms for teaching, 7 laboratories, 20 rooms, all six thousand square meters. There currently employs about hundred people.

The most important project in these laboratories is a bionic hand for people to have an upper limb amputee. The ARTS Lab - Advanced Robotics Technology and System, created the famous breakthrough in the field of bio-robotics with the so-called CYBER HAND, shown on CNN International's Vital Signs Life Hand report

In 2009 Polo Sant'Anna Valdera (PSAV) designed a robot for the home collection of trash.

== See also ==
- Scuola Normale Superiore
- University of Pisa
- École Normale Supérieure
- Superior Graduate Schools in Italy
- List of Italian universities
