= Pierdomenico Perata =

Italian physiologist (born 1962)

Pierdomenico Perata (born 24 March 1962 in Genova) is an Italian physiologist whose activities are focused on plant physiology and plant biology. Since 8 May 2013 he has been the rector of the Scuola Superiore Sant’Anna.

Perata is a member of the Accademia Nazionale dei Lincei, dell' Accademia dei Georgofili and of the National Academy of Sciences, known as Academy of the XL.

== Biography ==
Pierdomenico Perata graduated in Agricultural Sciences from University of Pisa. He earned another degree in Agricultural Sciences from Scuola Superiore Sant’Anna, and a PhD from the University of Pisa. He was visiting scientist in Nagoya University, Japan. He became assistant professor at the University of Pisa, associate professor in plant Physiology at the University of Bari, then full professor at University of Modena and Reggio Emilia, where he was also vice dean of Agriculture from 2003 to 2004. In 2004 he came back to the Scuola Superiore Sant’Anna as full professor. In 2010 he became dean of Experimental Sciences, and in 2012, after the resignation of Maria Chiara Carrozza (who had been elected member of the Italian Parliament), he became vice rector. Finally Perata was elected rector of Scuola Superiore Sant’Anna in May 2013.

== Scientific activity ==
His scientific activity is focused on plant physiology, with a main focus in molecular biology.

He has discovered and shown experimentally that starch metabolism represents an essential metabolic intersection for plants' tolerance to hypoxia. Other noteworthy discoveries that he contributed towards include the cross-communication between plant hormones and metabolic signals and the oxygen sensing mechanism in plants.
