= Laurea =

Italian academic degree

In Italy, the laurea is the main post-secondary academic degree. The name originally referred literally to the laurel wreath, since ancient times a sign of honor and now worn by Italian students right after their official graduation ceremony and sometimes during the graduation party. A graduate is known as a laureato, literally "crowned with laurel" and is awarded the title of dottore, or Doctor.

== The Laurea degree before the Bologna process ==
=== Early history ===
In the early Middle Ages Italian universities awarded both bachelor's and doctor's degrees. However very few bachelor's degrees from Italian universities are recorded in the later Middle Ages and none after 1500. Students could take the doctoral examination without studying at the university. This was criticised by northern Europeans as taking a degree per saltum because they had leapt over the regulations requiring years of study at the university.

=== Twentieth century ===
To earn a laurea (degree) undergraduate students had to complete four to six years of university courses, and finally complete a thesis.

Laureati are customarily addressed as dottore (for a man) or dottoressa (for a woman), as are holders of at least a laurea (Legge n. 240/2010 art. 17 comma 2 Riforma Gelmini). This is in contrast with the convention in countries where the title of doctor is restricted to holders of a PhD (or in some cases to medical doctors).

Until the introduction of the dottorato di ricerca (PhD-level education) in the mid-1980s, the laurea constituted the highest academic degree obtainable in Italy and gave the holders access to the highest academic positions. Nobel prize winners such as Enrico Fermi, Emilio Segrè, Giulio Natta, Carlo Rubbia and Giorgio Parisi held it as their highest degree.

The pre-Bologna laurea degree (formally named Diploma di laurea or Laurea vecchio ordinamento or Laurea), is now equivalent under Italian law to the new Italian master's degree named Laurea magistrale.

== Reforms due to the Bologna process ==
Spurred by the Bologna process, a major reform was instituted in 1999 to align its programmes with the more universal system of undergraduate (bachelor's degree) and postgraduate studies (master's and doctoral degrees). This allowed for greater mobility of university students via exchange programmes to other countries such as the United States and Commonwealth nations. The old laurea was split into undergraduate and postgraduate studies, and their programmes have been reformed.

=== First cycle: Laurea ===
The Laurea (180 ECTS credits), a first cycle degree that is equivalent to a bachelor's degree, includes bachelor-level courses, simpler than those of the old laurea, and its normative time to completion is three years (note that In Italy scuola secondaria superiore or Lyceum, high school, takes five years, so it ends at 19 years of age). To earn a laurea, the student must complete a thesis, but a less demanding one than required for the old laurea (typically, a non-research thesis). A graduate is granted by law the title of dottore (shortened dr. or dott.), or Doctor.

=== Second cycle: Laurea magistrale ===
The Laurea magistrale (formerly known as Laurea Specialistica, 2002–2006) is a second cycle degree equivalent to a master's degree (120 ECTS credits) which can be earned in a two-year programme after the laurea and requires an extensive thesis (usually, 150–250 pages).

In some fields (particularly Medicine, Law, Engineering and Architecture) the Laurea magistrale a ciclo unico is awarded. This is a five or six year second cycle (master's) degree (300 or 360 ECTS), which does not require a previous first cycle degree for the admission (like an Integrated master's degree in the UK).

The Laurea magistrale should not be confused with the Italian Master, which is not a master's degree, but a one-year diploma (60 ECTS) which guarantees a more practical education but does not give access to further levels of studies (it can be considered similar to a postgraduate certificate or a postgraduate diploma). A I level Master (Master di I livello) is a diploma which can be obtained after a Laurea; a II level Master (Master di II livello) can be gained after a Laurea magistrale and is useful for pursuing further studies (like a PhD) or for professional achievements.

A graduate is granted by law the title of dottore magistrale (shortened as dr. mag. or dott. mag.), or Magistral Doctor. However, the title is not commonly used, and graduates are simply addressed as "doctor".

=== Third cycle: Dottorato di ricerca ===
The Dottorato di ricerca (equivalent to a Doctor of Philosophy) is a third cycle degree which can be undertaken only after achieving a Laurea magistrale. It was introduced in the mid-1980s and consists of three/four years of PhD-level courses and experimental work, including the final defense of an innovative thesis.

Other than the PhD, another third-cycle title is the Diploma di Specializzazione, gained after a two-year (Law, Diploma di Specializzazione in Professioni legali) or a three-to-six year (Medicine, depending on the particular field) course of study and research. To enrol for a Diploma di Specializzazione, a Laurea magistrale (in Law or Medicine, respectively) is required. The Diploma di Specializzazione in Professioni legali is one of the ways to access the competition for appointment as a judge, whereas the Specializzazione in a specific medical field is required to be recognized as a Specialist Medical Doctor.

A graduate is granted by law the title of dottore di ricerca (shortened as dr. ric., dott. ric. or PhD), or Research Doctor. However, the title is not commonly used, and graduates are simply addressed as "doctor" or append "PhD" to their name following the English system of post-nominals.
