= Superior Graduate Schools in Italy =

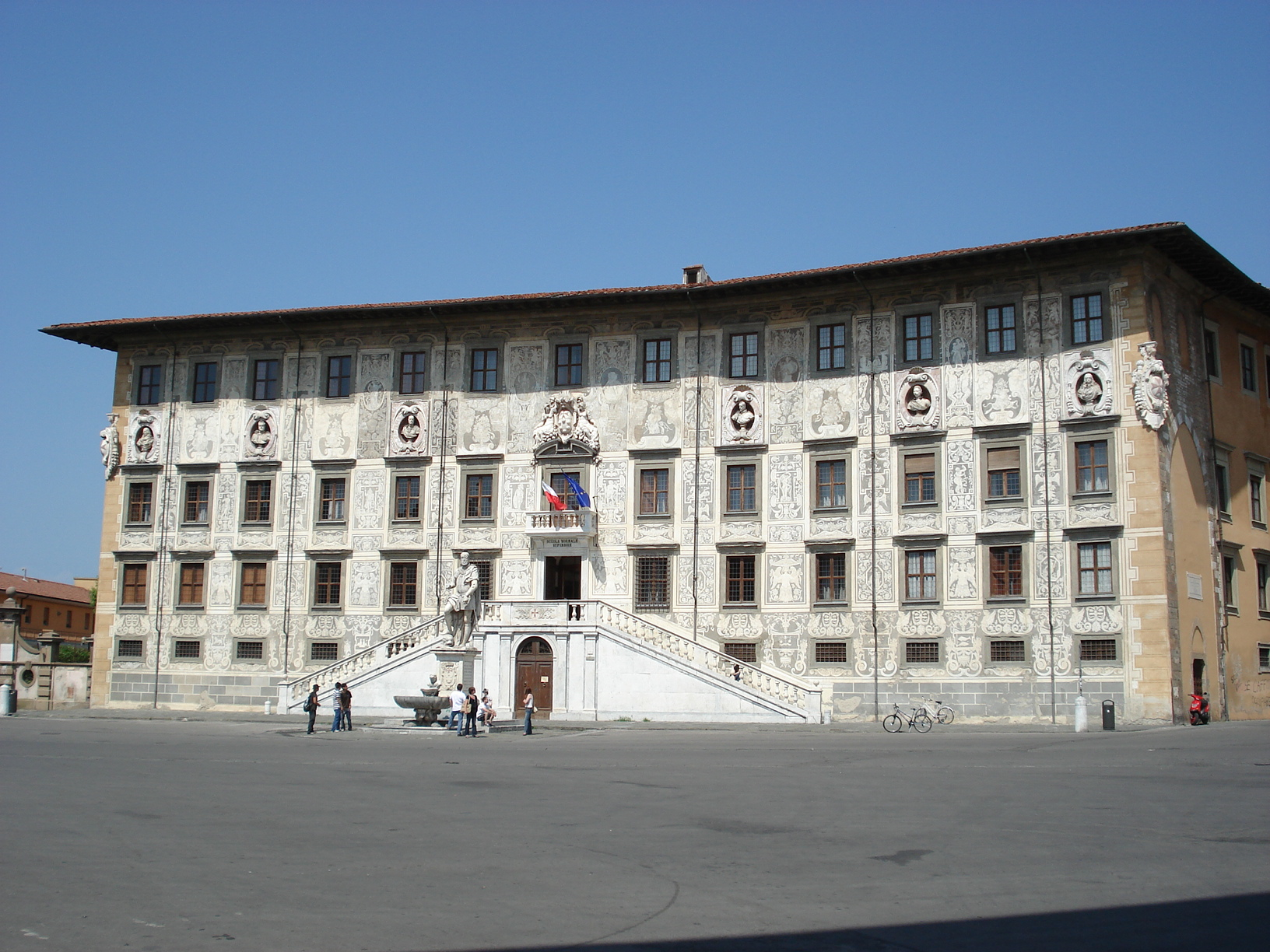
Palazzo della Carovana, Scuola Normale Superiore di Pisa main building

A Superior Graduate School (Italian: Scuola Superiore Universitaria) is a completely independent institution from a legal point of view, which offers advanced training and research through university-type courses or is dedicated to teaching at graduate or post-doctoral level.

The Superior Graduate Schools in Italy, the Scuola Superiore Universitaria, are recognized by the Ministry of Education, Universities and Research (MIUR) as fully autonomous. Three Superior Graduate Schools have "university status"; three institutes have the status of doctoral colleges, which function at graduate and post-graduate levels; and nine other schools are direct offshoots of universities, lacking independent university status. These state institutions are commonly referred to as Scuole di Eccellenza ("Schools of Excellence")

The institutions offer recognized national and international titles, including the Diploma di Perfezionamento (equivalent to a doctorate), Dottorato di Ricerca ("Research Doctorate"), and Doctor Philosophiae (Ph.D.). Some of these institutions, individually or in co-operation with the universities with which they work, also organize courses leading to master's degrees.

The oldest and most famous Superior Graduate School in Italy is the Scuola Normale Superiore di Pisa, founded in 1810 by Napoleon as a branch of the famous École Normale Supérieure in Paris, upon which it was modelled. The Sant'Anna School of Advanced Studies also has long history of existence in Italian education, as its origins are in the Collegio Medico-Giuridico of the Scuola Normale Superiore di Pisa and the Conservatorio di Sant'Anna, an even older educational institution with roots in the fourteenth century.

== Superior graduate schools with university status ==
- Scuola Normale Superiore di Pisa
- Sant'Anna School of Advanced Studies
- Scuola Superiore Studi Pavia IUSS
- Scuola Superiore Meridionale
- Gran Sasso Science Institute

== Superior graduate schools with the status of doctoral colleges ==
- International School for Advanced Studies di Trieste (SISSA)
- IMT School for Advanced Studies Lucca

== Superior graduate schools which are direct offshoots of other universities ==
- Collegio superiore of the University of Bologna
- Scuola di studi superiori dell'università degli studi di Torino of the University of Turin
- Scuola superiore dell'università di Siena Santa Chiara of the University of Siena
- Scuola superiore di Catania of the University of Catania
- SSAS - Sapienza School for Advanced Studies of Sapienza - University of Rome.
- Istituto superiore universitario di formazione interdisciplinare di Lecce (ISUFI) of the University of Salento
- Scuola galileiana di studi superiori di Padova (SGSS) of the University of Padua
- Collegio Internazionale Ca' Foscari of the Ca' Foscari University of Venice
- European College of Parma
- Scuola superiore dell'università di Udine of the University of Udine
- Scuola di Studi Superiori 'Giacomo Leopardi' of the University of Macerata
- Scuola di Studi Superiori 'Carlo Urbani' of the University of Camerino
- Scuola Superiore di Sardegna of the University of Sassari

== Research doctorate or Ph.D. ==
The first institution in Italy to create a doctoral program was Scuola Normale Superiore di Pisa in 1927 under the historic name "Diploma di Perfezionamento". Further, the dottorato di ricerca was introduced by law and presidential decree in 1980, in a reform of academic teaching, training and experimentation in organisation and teaching methods.

The Superior Graduate Schools in Italy (Italian: Scuola Superiore Universitaria), also called Schools of Excellence (Italian: Scuole di Eccellenza) such as Scuola Normale Superiore di Pisa and Sant'Anna School of Advanced Studies keep their historical "Diploma di Perfezionamento" title by law and MIUR Decree.

The Superior Graduate School or Scuola Superiore Universitaria has "Diplomi di Perfezionamento ", which are equivalent to "Dottorati di Ricerca" (PhD).:

- Diplomi di Perfezionamento: Scuola Normale Superiore, Pisa - Legge n. 308/1986
- Diplomi di Perfezionamento: Scuola Superiore di Studi Universitari e di Perfezionamento "SANT'ANNA", Pisa - Legge N. 41/1987
- Diplomi di Perfezionamento: Alta Scuola Europea di Scienze Religiose Fondazione per le Scienze Religiose Giovanni XXIII, Bologna -D.M. Murst 19.10.1999
- Diplomi di Perfezionamento: Scuola Internazionale di Alti Studi della Cultura Fondazione collegio s. Carlo, Modena - D.M. Murst 4.5.1998
- Diplomi di Perfezionamento: Società Internazionale per lo Studio del Medioevo Latino, Fondazione Ezio Franceschini, Firenze - D.M. 3.4.2001
- Diplomi di Perfezionamento: Istituto Nazionale di Studi sul Rinascimento, Firenze - D.M. 9.10.2001
- Diplomi di Perfezionamento: Scuola Internazionale Superiore di Studi Avanzati (SISSA). Trieste - D.M. Murst 24.2.1993
- Diploma di Doctor Philosophiae (PhD): European University Institute (Istituto Universitario Europeo), Fiesole/Firenze - Legge N. 352/1986
- Diplomi di Perfezionamento: Istituto di scienze farmacologiche “Mario Negri”, Milano - D.M. MIUR 11.11.2008
- Dottorato in Studi Storici: Università degli Studi S. Marino - D.M. Murst 11.6.1990 and scambio Note 16.7.1999 in vigore dal 28.11.2000
- Dottorato in Ingegneria Gestionale: Università degli Studi S. Marino - D.M. Murst 11.6.1990 and scambio Note 16.7.1999 in vigore dal 28.11.2000
- Diplomi di Perfezionamento: Fondazione Internazionale per gli studi superiori di Architettura, Scuola Superiore Europea di Architettura Urbana - Napoli - D.M. MIUR 14 Luglio 2006

== See also ==
- École Normale Supérieure
- Grande école
- List of Italian universities
