= Sant'Anna School of Advanced Studies =

University in Italy

Coordinates: 43°43′13.23″N 10°24′10.34″E

- Italian: Scuola Superiore Sant'Anna di Studi Universitari e di Perfezionamento
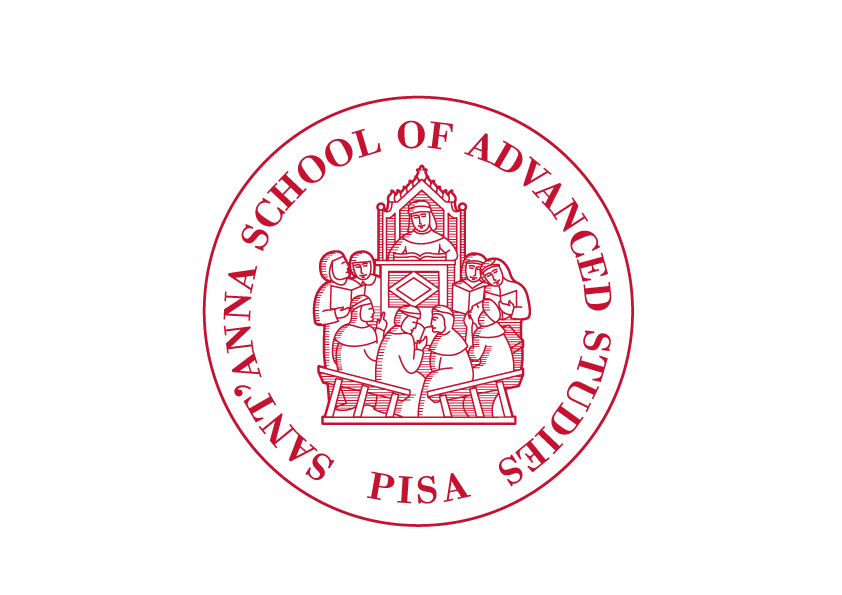
- Motto: L'eccellenza come disciplina
- Motto in English: Committed to excellence
- Type: State-supported
- Established: 1987 from previously existing institutions
- Affiliations: Pisa University System
- Rector: Prof. Nicola Vitiello
- Administrative staff: 82
- Students: 1,652 (including those attending masters)
- Undergraduates: 232
- Doctoral students: 342
- Location: Pisa, Italy
- Colours: Blue and Red

The Sant'Anna School of Advanced Studies (Italian: SSSA, Scuola Superiore di Studi Universitari e di Perfezionamento Sant'Anna) is a special-statute, highly selective public research university located in Pisa, Italy. Together with the University of Pisa and Scuola Normale Superiore di Pisa, it is part of the Pisa University System.

The rector is Nicola Vitiello, who took office on 8 May 2025, succeeding Sabina Nuti (rector from 7 May 2019). Before her, the rector of the school was Pierdomenico Perata, elected on 8 May 2013 after the resignation of Maria Chiara Carrozza, due to her election as Member of Parliament and appointment as Minister of Education, University and Research.

Since January 2014, the school has been presided over by Yves Mény, until the School joined the first Federation of Universities in Italy, together with two among the other twenty Scuole Superiori Universitarie (Grandes Écoles): Scuola Normale Superiore and Scuola Superiore Studi Pavia IUSS. Before him, the president was Giuliano Amato, a former prime minister of Italy and currently judge of the Constitutional Court.

The undergraduate Allievi Ordinari of the School are selected through a public examination. They are all awarded a full government-funded scholarship which includes accommodation, canteen, research and travel grants. In exchange, they are expected to hold the highest standards in their studies at both the School and at the partner Universities.

== History ==
The present-day Sant'Anna School of Advanced Studies is the descendant of several institutions modelled on the Scuola Normale Superiore di Pisa, also known in Italian as Scuola Normale, which is a higher learning institution in Pisa. It was founded in 1810, by Napoleonic decree, as a branch of the École normale supérieure of Paris.

The school, whose origins, in the context of the Pisa university reality, are rooted in the Collegio Medico-Giuridico already attached to the Scuola Normale Superiore and the Collegio Antonio Pacinotti, and was formally established by the Law of 14 February 1987, No. 41, which marked the unification of the Scuola Superiore di Studi Universitari e di Perfezionamento Law (7 March 1967), No. 117, and the Conservatorio di Sant'Anna, the Royal Decree of 13 February 1908 No. LXXVIII.

=== Origins of Sant'Anna ===
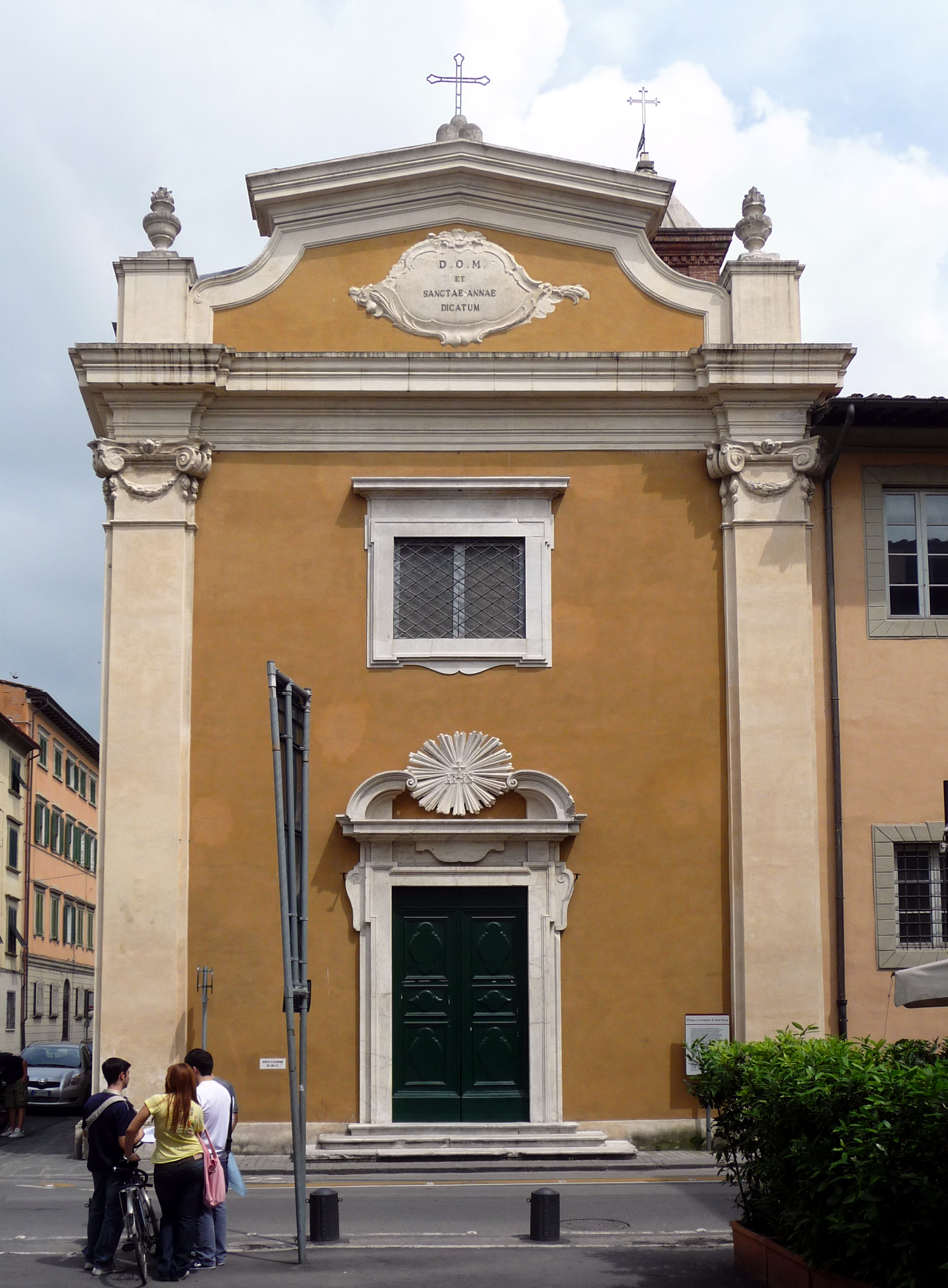
View of Sant'Anna Church

- Sant'Anna Church and Convent

The present-day site is acquired from a very ancient religious educational establishment. The Sant'Anna Church and Convent was established in 1406, while the church was finished in 1426, by the Order of the Benedictine Nuns (OSB).

- Conservatorio di Sant'Anna

In 1785, the Conservatorio di Sant'Anna was initiated by the Grand Duchy of Tuscany. Leopold II, Holy Roman Emperor as a consequence of abolition of the religious orders due to Leopold's reforms; the convent was suppressed in 1786.

- Conservatorio di Sant'Anna, an educational institution; later under the tutelage of the Ministry of Education of the Kingdom of Italy and the Italian Republic.
- Sant'Anna replaced Antonio Pacinotti in 1987, when the School gained its current headquarters. In 1987 the Benedictine Nuns dedicated the Sant'Anna Church and Convent to the Scuola Superiore di Studi Universitari e Perfezionamento (previously the Collegio Medico-Giuridico of the Scuola Normale Superiore di Pisa), provided the School carried the name of Sant'Anna.
- The origins of Sant'Anna School of Advanced Studies within Scuola Normale Superiore di Pisa: the Scuola Normale Superiore was founded in 1810 by Napoleonic decree, as twin institution of the École normale supérieure in Paris, itself dating back to the French Revolution jurisdiction. The term "École normale" ("Scuola Normale") was coined by Joseph Lakanal who, in submitting a report to the National Convention of 1794 on behalf of the Committee of Public Instruction, explained it thus: "Normales: du latin norma, règle. Ces écoles doivent être en effet le type et la règle de toutes les autres."
- The Decree of Foundation - Napoleon I rethought the project of an École normale in 1808, by establishing a Normale Hall of Residence in Paris to house young students and train them in the art of teaching the humanities and sciences. The project was replicated in Tuscany by a decree dated 18 October 1810, with the foundation in Pisa, seat of one of the Imperial University academies, of a branch of the Paris-based École normale supérieure, "Scuola Normale Superiore".
- The Grand-Duchy Period: 1847–1859 - on 28 November 1846, a grand-ducal motu proprio founded a Tuscan Scuola Normale in Pisa (also referred to as the Imperial Royal Scuola Normale, as it was linked to the Austrian system), with both theoretical and practical aims, under the patronage of the Order of Saint Stephen, but depending on the University of Pisa.
- The Scuola Normale during the Kingdom of Italy: 1859–1862 - on 17 October 1862 the Minister of Education of the Kingdom of Italy Carlo Matteucci implemented new regulations in a decree that transformed the institution to the Normal School of the Kingdom of Italy, which was to have an organic division between the faculties of Arts and Sciences.
- The Scuola Normale under Gentile: 1928–1943 - philosopher Giovanni Gentile, was placed at the head of the Scuola Normale Superiore di Pisa as commissioner in 1928 and as director in 1932. He reformed the Scuola, gave it formal autonomy and sought an expansion to other disciplines, with the creation of the Collegio Mussolini per le Scienze Corporative (1931), and the Collegio Nazionale Medico (1932). The new colleges were later merged to form the Collegio Medico-Giuridico, which continued to operate (in the fields of Law and Medicine) under the jurisdiction of the Scuola Normale Superiore di Pisa.
- Post-war Period - Scuola Normale Superiore in 1951, established the Antonio Pacinotti boarding school i.e. Collegio ‘Antonio Pacinotti, reserved to students of the faculties of Agriculture, Economics and Engineering, with plans to be further opened to other faculties.
- The origins of present-day structure of Sant'Anna School of Advanced Studies: the present structure of Sant'Anna School of Advanced Studies was established in 1967 as Scuola Superiore di Studi Universitari e Perfezionamento, by a merger of the Collegio Antonio Pacinotti (Scuola per le Scienze Applicate A. Pacinotti; founded 1951), and the Collegio Medico-Giuridico of the Scuola Normale Superiore di Pisa. The new institution, committed to the model established by the Scuola Normale Superiore di Pisa, was administered by the University of Pisa.
- Establishment of the Sant'Anna School of Advanced Studies; Law of 14 February 1987 No. 41 - Scuola Superiore di Studi Universitari e di Perfezionamento Sant'Anna. In 1987 Sant'Anna School of Advanced Studies acquired complete independence (Law of 14 February 1987, No.41) and maintains strong ties with both the Scuola Normale Superiore di Pisa and the University of Pisa, creating the Pisa University System.

=== The present-day structure ===
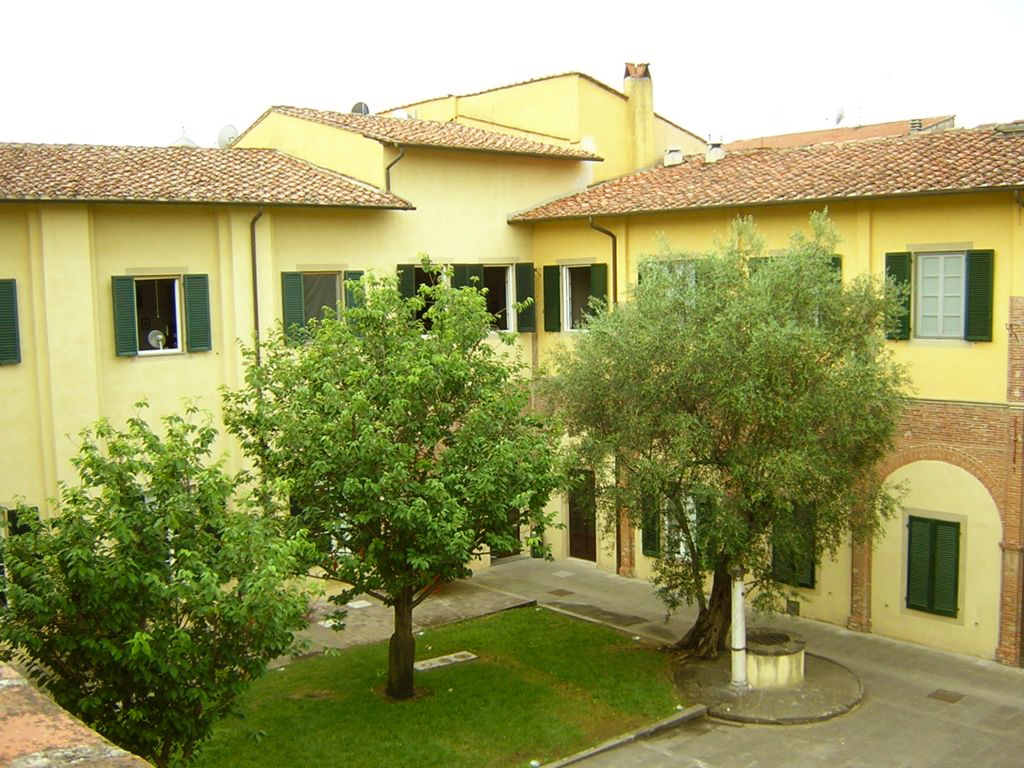
View of the courtyard of Sant'Anna School of Advanced Studies

Sant'Anna School of Advanced Studies, Scuola Normale Superiore di Pisa and the University of Pisa create the Pisa University System. The Sant'Anna School of Advanced Studies has been given separate university status by the Ministry of Education, Universities and Research (Italy) and together with Scuola Normale Superiore di Pisa is leading the model of Scuole di Eccellenza, i.e. Superior Graduate School in Italy (Grandes écoles)

== Organization ==
Students are admitted after passing public national and international competitions. Sant'Anna School of Advanced Studies offers to those who decide to take excellence, a multi-disciplinary approach to learning, research, and internationalization.

== Academics and research ==
Students are admitted after passing public national and international competitions. The fields of study and research are:

Class	Subjects
Social Sciences Class	Business Sciences, Economic Sciences, Legal Sciences, Political Sciences
Experimental Sciences Class	Agricultural Sciences, Medical Sciences, Industrial Engineering, Information Engineering

=== Undergraduate programs ===
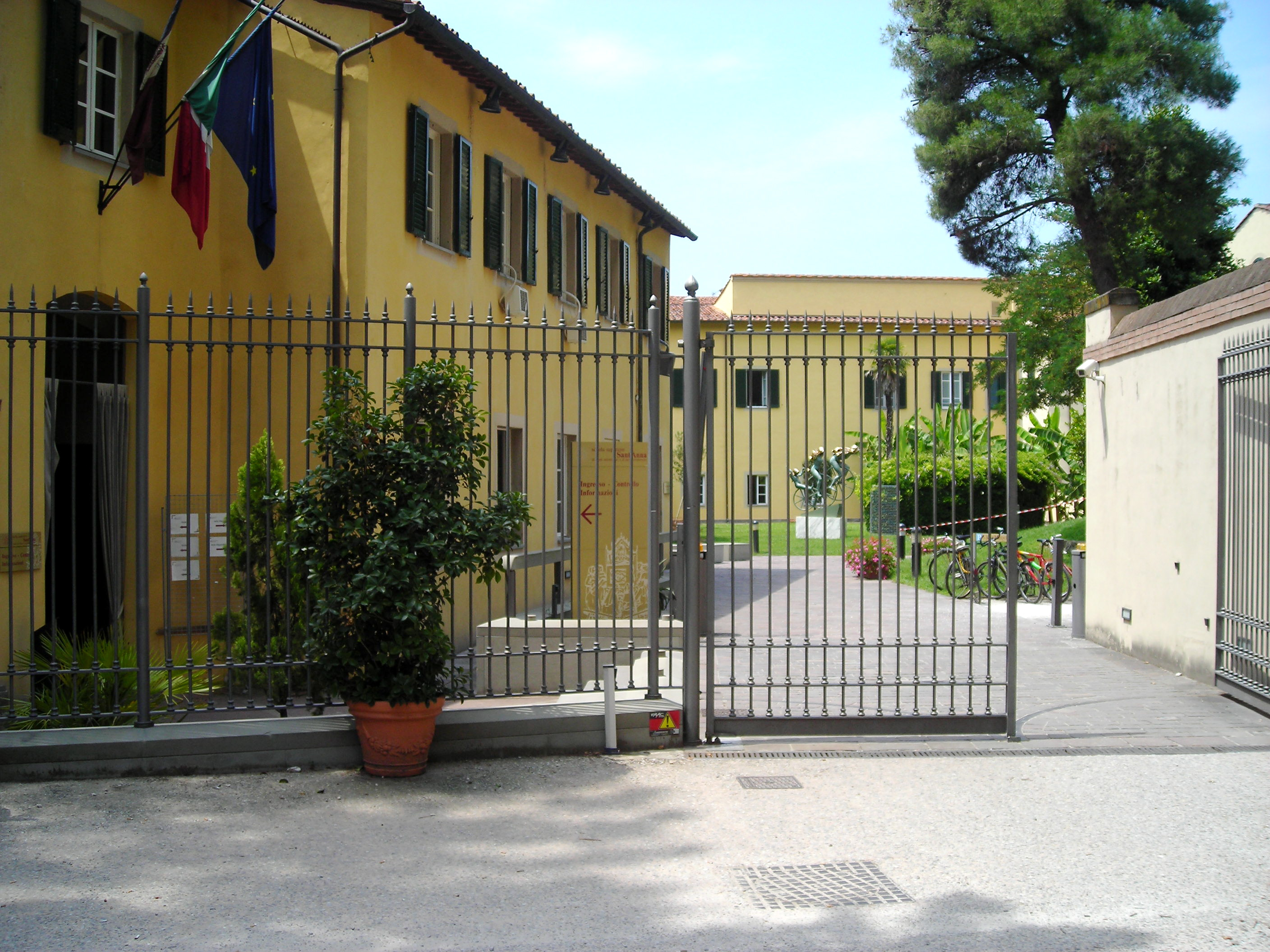
Sant'Anna School of Advanced Studies: main gate

Prospective undergraduates undergo a rigorous public examination, and only the very best are creamed off to combine their Pisa University studies with the extra options available at Scuola Superiore Sant'Anna, thus these students are called Honors College Students (Italian: Allievi Ordinari). Scuola Superiore Sant'Anna is also integrated with the Scuola Normale Superiore and Honors College Students are free to attend courses provided by departments other than their own, as well as those provided by the Scuola Normale Superiore.

As of 2020, 50 freshmen are admitted per year, equally divided between the Class of Social Sciences and the Class of Experimental Sciences. The School offers all of its services free of charge (accommodation, canteen, internet connection, library); students also receive a small yearly income for their maintenance. While attending the Pisa University courses, the Honors College Students (allievi) live in the school's college. Students have to achieve a high average grade in university exams (at least 27/30) and attend internal courses (including foreign language classes offered in French, Spanish, German and Chinese) taught by professors and researchers working at the School, both as an integration and as an extension to the regular academic schedule.

=== Graduate programs ===
The School also offers graduate courses such as master and doctoral programmes, provided by its research laboratories and joint ventures with foreign universities, leading enterprises and international organizations.

=== Doctoral programs (PhD) ===
The first institution in Italy to create a doctoral program (PhD) was Scuola Normale Superiore di Pisa in 1927 under the historic name "Diploma di Perfezionamento". Research doctorates or PhD (Italian: Dottorato di ricerca) in Italy were introduced with law and Presidential Decree in 1980 (Law of 21 February 1980, No. 28 and the Presidential Decree No. 382 of 11 July 1980), referring to the reform of academic teaching, training and experimentation in organisation and teaching methods.

Hence, the Superior Graduate Schools in Italy (Grandes écoles) (Italian: Scuola Superiore Universitaria), also called Schools of Excellence (Italian: Scuole di Eccellenza) such as Scuola Normale Superiore and Sant'Anna School of Advanced Studies still keep their reputed historical "Diploma di Perfezionamento" PhD title by law and MIUR Decree.

The Doctoral Programmes at Sant'Anna School of Advanced Studies grant Diploma di Perfezionamento, a degree fully equivalent to a PhD and are recognized International Doctoral Programmes involving various forms of collaboration and joint ventures with foreign universities.

=== Post-doctoral education and research ===
There are also worldwide important international corporations and industrial partners that are closely linked to Sant'Anna School of Advanced Studies, such as: the nearby Piaggio where there are special Sant'Anna Laboratories at the Polo Sant'Anna Valdera (PSAV), which contributes to the industrial process, Leonardo, Fiat (Centro Ricerche Fiat), Telecom Italia, Marconi Communications, Ericsson Research, Deutsche Telekom, Mitsubishi Electric Corporation, Fujitsu Laboratories Ltd, etc.

Polo Sant'Anna Valdera (PSAV) is a research center of Sant'Anna School of Advanced Studies based in Pontedera (Pisa). It was inaugurated in 2002 thanks to the interest of the then president of Piaggio, Giovanni Alberto Agnelli. The property is housed in converted sheds donated by Piaggio. The main research is in the fields of robotics, bioengineering, biotechnology, precision engineering, computing and virtual environments. Polo Sant'Anna Valdera (PSAV) has 25 offices, 4 classrooms for teaching, 7 laboratories, 20 rooms, all six thousand square meters. There currently employs about hundred people. The most important project in these laboratories is a bionic hand for people to have an upper limb amputee. The ARTS Lab - Advanced Robotics Technology and System, created the famous breakthrough in the field of bio-robotics with the so-called CYBER HAND, shown on CNN International's Vital Signs Life Hand report. Sant'Anna also undertakes many international projects which are tied to the European Commission, the Government of Italy and its ministries, as well as regional projects of the Region of Tuscany and the Province of Pisa. The school maintains a number of research laboratories, some of which are located at the National Research Council (CNR) whose largest research center is in Pisa.

In the framework of the bilateral cooperation between Italy and China i.e. the Office of Chinese Language Council International (Hanban), Scuola Superiore Sant'Anna hosts the third Italian Confucius Institute.

Research Institutes:

- Institute of Management (Italian: Istituto di Management) includes the laboratories: MAIN, MES and SUM.
- Institute of Economics (Italian: Istituto di Economia) includes the laboratory LEM.
- Institute Dirpolis (Law, Politics and Development) (Italian: Istituto Dirpolis (Diritto, Politica e Sviluppo)) includes the laboratories: Lider, Cdg, CSGS and Wiss.
- Institute TeCIP, Institute of Communication, Information and Perception Technologies (Italian: Istituto TeCIP, Istituto di Tecnologie della Comunicazione, dell'Informazione e della Percezione) includes the laboratories: IRCPhoNet, Percro, Retis.
- Institute of Biorobotics (Italian: Istituto di Biorobotica) includes the laboratories: ARTSLab, CRIMLab and EZ-Lab.
- Institute of Life Sciences (Italian: Istituto di Scienze della Vita) includes the laboratories: Laboratory of Medical Sciences, Biolabs, LandLab and PlantLab.

=== Laboratories and research centers ===
Management

- MAIN – Management & Innovation Laboratory
- MeS Lab – Management and Health Laboratory
- SUM LAb – Sustainability Management

Economics

- LEM – Laboratory of Economics and Management
- CAFED – Centre for the Analysis of Financial and Economics Dynamics
- EZ-Lab – Center for Research on the technology and support services for the Longevity

Laws

- LIDER – International and Comparative Law Research Laboratory
- STALS – Sant’Anna Legal Studies
- Research Centre on Social, Juridical and Human Rights Sciences

Political Science

- CDG Laboratory – International Research Laboratory on Conflict, Development and Global Politics
- ITPCM – International Training Programme for Conflict Management
- Iran Electoral Archive

Engineering

- ARTS Lab – Advanced Robotics Technology and System, which created the famous breakthrough in the field of bio-robotics with the so-called CYBER HAND, shown on CNN International's Vital Signs Life Hand report
- CRIM Lab – Center of Research In Microengineering
- RoboCasa, the Italy-Japan joint laboratory for Research on Humanoid and Personal Robotics
- Joint Lab Italy – Korea
- CEIICP – Centre of Excellence for Information, Communication and Perception Engineering. The centre is a result of a joint venture in the telecommunications sector between the Sant'Anna School and Marconi Communications SpA (now Ericsson). In partnership with CNIT (National Inter-University Consortium for Telecommunications), the two parties signed an agreement for the creation of a research centre for photonic networks and technologies, thus realizing through CEIICP a unique example of synergy in Italy.
- IRCPHONET – Integrated Research Centre for Photonic Networks and Technologies
- RETIS lab – Real-Time Systems Laboratory
- PERCRO – Perceptual Robotics

Agrobiociences

- Land Lab – Agriculture, Environment and Landscape
- BIOLABS – BIOlogical LABoratorieS
- PLANT LAB – Plant and Crop Physiology

Medicine

- Laboratory of Medical Science
- European Transplantation Management Centre – Research Centre on E-TX-MAN organ and tissue detection, donation and transplant and related

==== Partner universities and international agreements ====
Sant'Anna School of Advanced Studies has signed international agreements with respected partner universities around the globe.

== World rankings ==
University rankings

Global – Overall
- ARWU World: 201–300
- THE World: 180

Regional – Overall
- THE Europe: 50

As part of the Pisa University System, Sant'Anna School of Advanced Studies is small and elite, specialised only in applied sciences. The Academic Ranking of World Universities puts it, together with Scuola Normale Superiore, at the 1st place in Italy (National Rank # 1) and within the best 30 universities in Europe.

In 2016 Times Higher Education World University Rankings the 150 Under 50 Rankings 2016, Sant'Anna School of Advanced Studies is ranked #10 in the world. As for 2015–16 rankings, Times Higher Education World University Rankings puts Sant'Anna School of Advanced Studies at 180th place in the world, 90 place in Europe and 2nd in Italy, and Scuola Normale Superiore 112 place in the world, 50 place in Europe and 1st in Italy. According to Times Higher Education World University Rankings, Sant'Anna School of Advanced Studies is in top 20% in teaching, industry income and citations in the world, and Scuola Normale Superiore is in top 10% in teaching and top 20% in research on global level. Also, Sant'Anna School of Advanced Studies together with Scuola Normale Superiore are named as leading institutions in Italy's six top higher education institutes by Times Higher Education World University Rankings, where for 2014–2015 was ranked at 63rd place in the world and 15th in Europe.

Sant'Anna School of Advanced Studies has been mapped by Times Higher Education-QS World University Rankings as one of the most important educational institutions in Italy (section on Italy i.e. Top universities and specialisms ), having its Graduate/Postgraduate Profile.

For 2016 the QS World University Rankings has ranked Sant'Anna School of Advanced Studies in the subject categories economics and econometrics on world stage at # 201. As far as the rankings in the faculty category is concerned, it is ranked on world stage at # 385 for engineering and technology.

- According to QS World University Rankings, Sant'Anna School of Advanced Studies is part of the initiative Invest Your Talent in Italy which "puts Italian graduate programmes on the world's stage."

The Scimago Institution Ranking are based on the SCOPUS bibliometric database, featuring thirteen performance indicators of, innovation and web visibility. The following are some of Sant'Anna Schools best results at the world and national level:

World The official agency of the Italian Ministry of Education, Universities and Research (MIUR), the Agenzia nazionale di valutazione del sistema universitario e della ricerca (ANVUR) ranks Sant'Anna School of Advanced Studies the best small university for 2013 in Italy (National Rank # 1).

The European Research Ranking, a ranking based on publicly available data from the European Commission database puts Pisa University System among the best in Italy and best performing European research institutions .

In 2008, the Italian website La Voce published a ranking of Italian universities by h-index limited to the Departments of Economics, where Sant'Anna School of Advanced Studies acquires the first (#1) place in Italy.

== Notable alumni and faculty ==
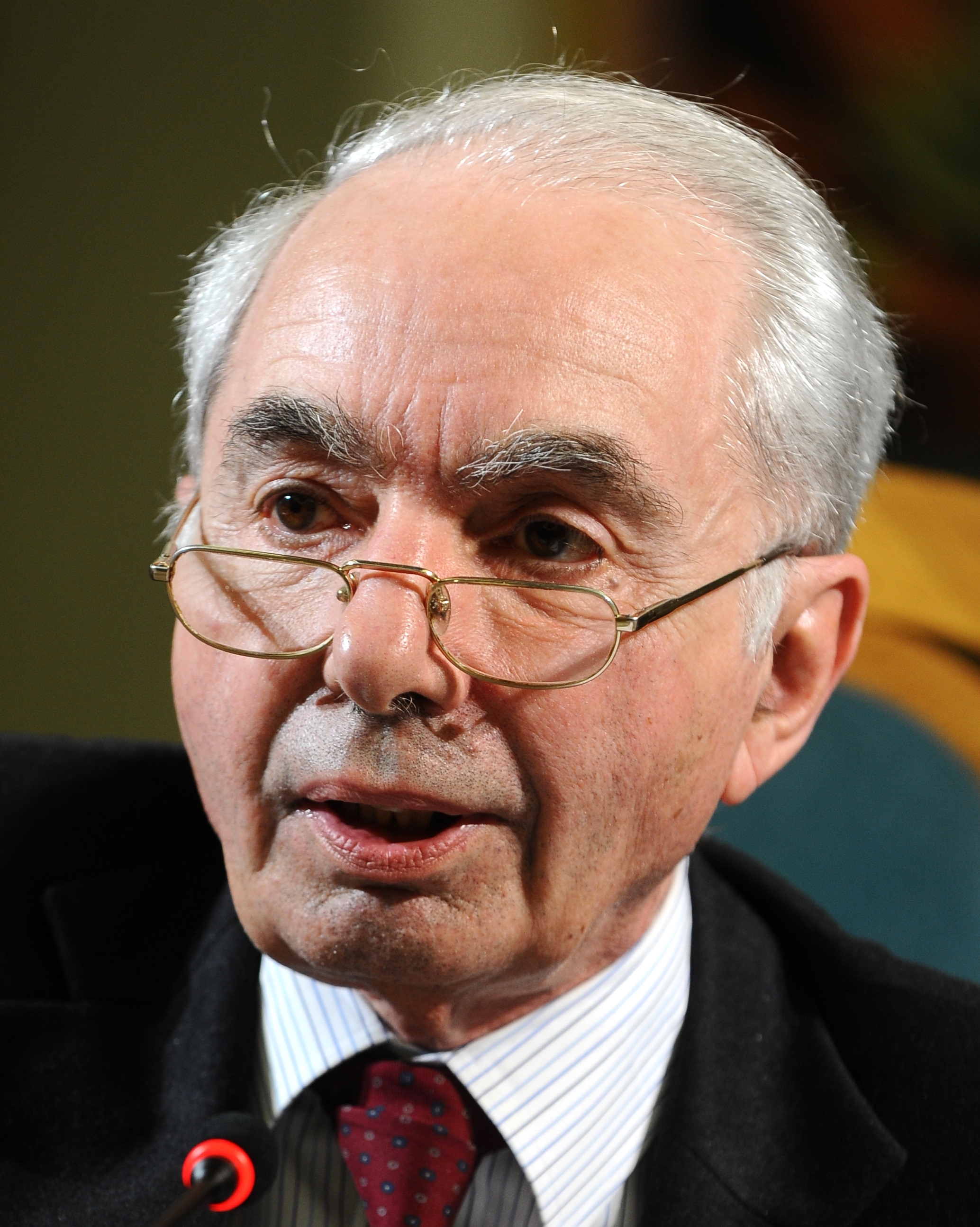
Giuliano Amato

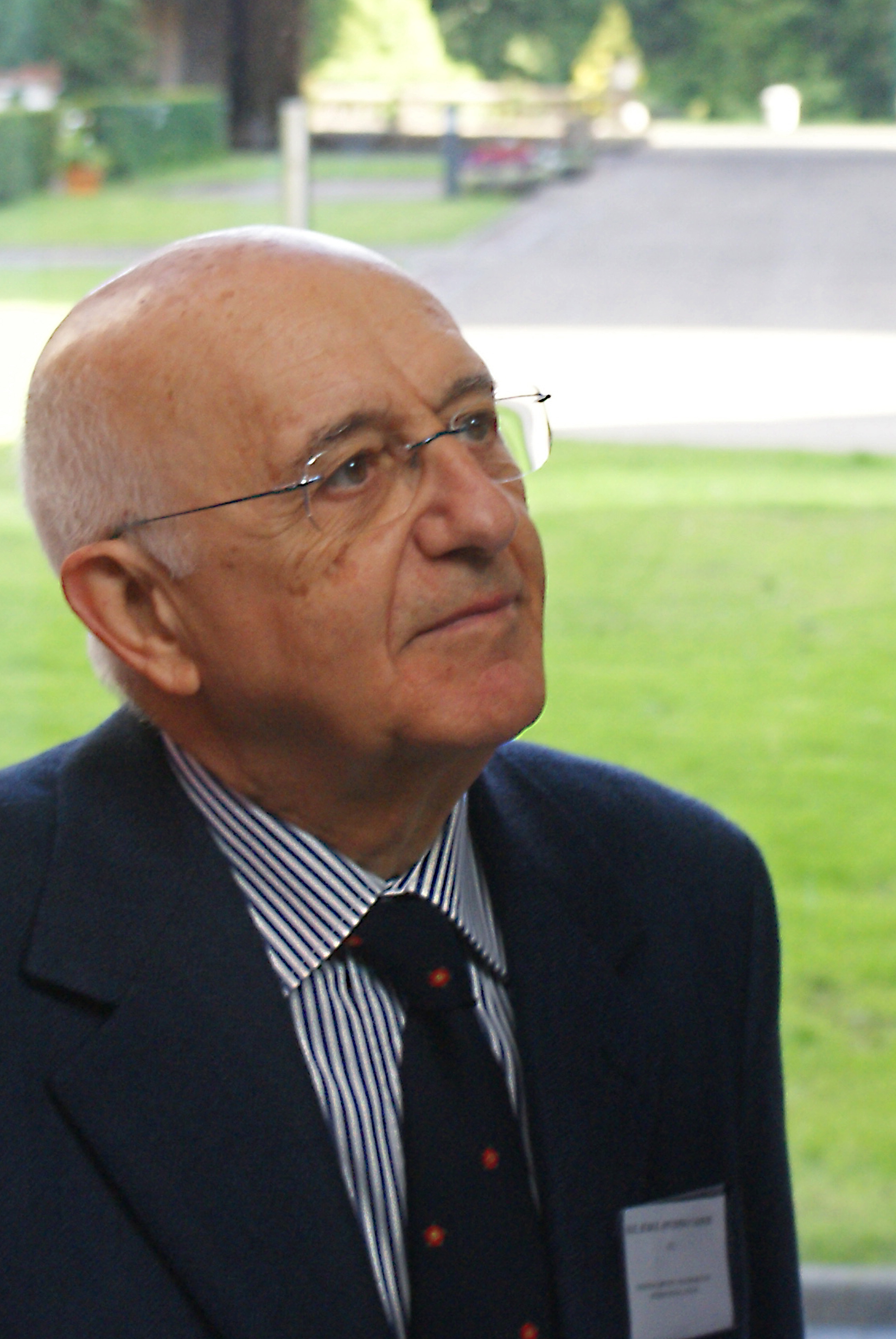
Antonio Cassese

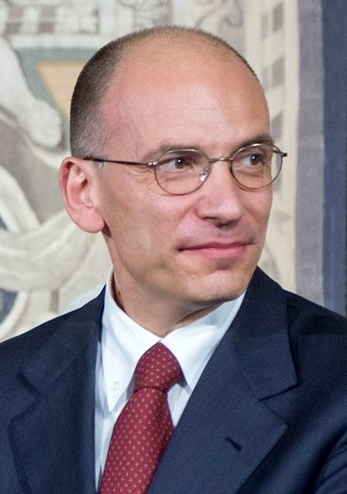
Enrico Letta

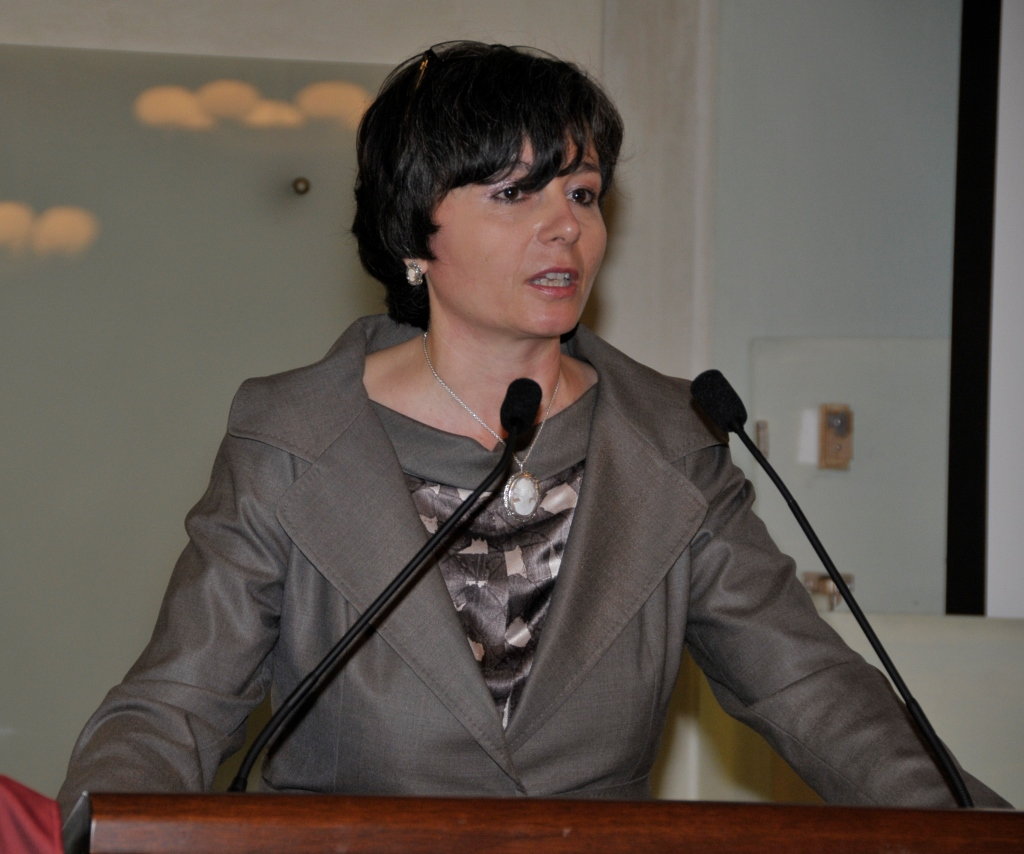
Maria Chiara Carrozza

Faculty and alumni of note include:

- Giuliano Amato, Prime Minister of Italy (1992–1993 and 2000–2001), Vice President of the Convention on the Future of Europe that drafted the new European Constitution and headed the Amato Group.
- Paolo Emilio Taviani, Italian Minister of Defence (1953–1958), Italian Minister of the Interior (1962–1963, 1963–1968, 1973–1974)
- Antonio Maccanico, Minister of Communications (1996–1998), Minister for Institutional Reforms (1999–2001)
- Giovanni Pieraccini, Minister of Public Affairs (1963–1964), Minister of Economic Affairs (1964–1965), Minister of Merchant Fleet (1973–1974), Minister of Scientific Research (1974)
- Carlo Smuraglia, parliament deputy and senator at the Senate of the Republic (Italy)
- Antonio Cassese, first President of the International Criminal Tribunal For the Former Yugoslavia (ICTY)(1993–1997), in 2004 appointed by United Nations Secretary-General Kofi Annan to be the chairperson for the International Commission of Inquiry on Darfur
- Sabino Cassese, Professor of Administrative Law and a judge of the Constitutional Court of Italy
- Pier Francesco Guarguaglini, former president of Leonardo, the largest hi-tech industrial group based in Italy and one of the largest defence industry conglomerates in the world
- Enrico Letta, elected to the Italian Chamber of Deputies, Deputy Secretary of the Democratic Party (Italy), Prime Minister of Italy (2013–2014)
- Maria Chiara Carrozza, Professor of Engineering at Sant'Anna School of Advanced Studies, Minister of Education, Universities and Research (2013–2014)
- Marcello Spatafora, Italian Ambassador to Malaysia (1980–1986), Ambassador to Malta (1986–1989), Ambassador to Australia (1993–1997), Ambassador to Albania (1997–1999), Chief of the Italian delegation responsible for organizing the country's presidency of the European Economic Community (1989–1990), as of 2000 Permanent Representative of Italy to the United Nations, President of the United Nations Security Council in 2007
- Fabrizio Pagani, economist and policy expert, former Italy's G20 Sherpa and OECD Director
- Tiziano Terzani, Italian journalist and writer
- Vittorio Grilli, Deputy Minister of the Ministry of Economy and Finance (government of Mario Monti), part of the Board of Directors of Sant'Anna School of Advanced Studies, and board-member of the respected European think-thank Bruegel (institution)
- Riccardo Varaldo, economist and holder of the prestigious Cavaliere di Gran Croce dell'Ordine al Merito della Repubblica i.e. Order of Merit of the Italian Republic, President of Sant'Anna School of Advanced Studies of Pisa, Member of many Ministries' entities, President of the Società Italiana di Marketing
- Nicola Bellini, economist and Director of IRPET (Istituto Regionale per la Programmazione Economica della Toscana)
- Nicoletta Batini, economist, notable as a scholar of innovative monetary and fiscal policy practices, as well as structural reforms for the promotion of export competitiveness especially in the shipping industry. She is currently rated among the 5% top most cited authors in economics worldwide (RePEc). She began her active career as an economist with the Bank of England in London and has handled extensive consultancy roles in the public sector. She is currently a Director of Italy's Department of the Treasury within the Ministry of Economy and Finances (Italy) in Rome in charge of the international economy and economic policies.
- Giovanni Dosi, economist, co-director of the specific task forces on industrial policy and intellectual property rights within the Initiative for Policy Dialogue, editor of the Oxford University Press Journal Continental Europe of Industrial and Corporate Change
- Stefan Collignon, professor of political economy, International Chief Economist of the Centro Europa Ricerche, founder of Euro Asia Forum at Sant'Anna School of Advanced Studies. Previously, he was Centennial Professor of European Political Economy at the London School of Economics and Political Science (LSE) (2001–2005) and visiting professor at Harvard University (2005–2007), also taught at University of Hamburg, Institut d’Etudes Politiques, College of Europe and at the Free University of Berlin. Also served as Deputy Director General for Europe in the Federal Ministry of Finance (Germany) (1999–2000).
- Giulio Tononi, Neuroscientist and psychiatrist who holds the David P. White Chair in Sleep Medicine, as well as a Distinguished Chair in Consciousness Science, at the University of Wisconsin.
- Antonio L'Abbate, Professor of Medical Sciences at Sant'Anna School of Advanced Studies and together with Giovanni Dosi one of the top Italian Scientists
- Giorgio Buttazzo, Professor at Sant'Anna School of Advanced Studies, Editor-in-Chief of the Journal of Real-Time Systems (Springer) and chair of the prestigious IEEE Technical Committee on Real-Time Systems (2010–12)
- Luca Desiata, Ceo at SOGIN and editor-in-chief of Hebdomada Aenigmatum, the first magazine of Latin crosswords
- Francesca Gino, Italian-American behavioral scientist

== See also ==
- Scuola Normale Superiore
- École Normale Supérieure
- Superior Graduate Schools in Italy
- List of Italian universities
