= Lovelock =

Lovelock may refer to:

== Places ==
- Lovelock, California, United States, an unincorporated community
- Lovelock, Nevada, United States, a city
  - Lovelock Correctional Center, a state prison
  - Lovelock Cave, a cave and archaeological site
- 51663 Lovelock, an asteroid

== People and fictional characters ==
- Lovelock (surname), including a list of people and fictional characters
- Lovelock, soft rock disco alter ego of musician Steve Moore

== Science ==
- Lovelock's theorem, a theorem about gravity
- Lovelock theory of gravity, an extension of Einstein's theory of general relativity

== Arts and entertainment ==
- Lovelock (novel), a science fiction novel by Orson Scott Card and Kathryn H. Kidd
- Lovelock, a book by James McNeish about Jack Lovelock
- Lovelock!, a 1976 soul/disco album by Gene Page

== Other meanings ==
- Lovelock (hair), a hairstyle popular in the late 16th and early 17th centuries
- Lovelock Shield, an Australian rules football competition

== See also ==
- Love lock, a symbol of romantic love
- Locks of Love, a US-based charity
- Livelock, a concept in computer science
