= Luigi Bianchi =

Italian mathematician (1856–1928)

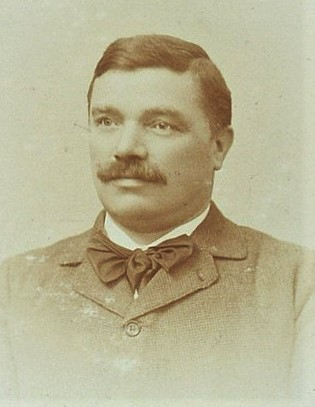
- Born: 18 January 1856; Parma, Emilia-Romagna
- Died: 6 June 1928 (aged 72); Pisa
- Education: Scuola Normale Superiore
- Known for: Bianchi classification Bianchi group Bianchi identities Bianchi transform
- Scientific career
- Fields: Mathematics
- Workplaces: Scuola Normale Superiore
- Doctoral advisor: Enrico Betti; Ulisse Dini
- Doctoral students: Luigi Fantappiè; Guido Fubini; Mauro Picone; Giovanni Sansone

Luigi Bianchi (18 January 1856 – 6 June 1928) was an Italian mathematician. He was born in Parma, Emilia-Romagna, and died in Pisa. He was a leading member of the vigorous geometric school which flourished in Italy during the later years of the 19th century and the early years of the twentieth century.

== Biography ==
Like his friend and colleague Gregorio Ricci-Curbastro, Bianchi studied at the Scuola Normale Superiore in Pisa under Enrico Betti, a leading differential geometer who is today best remembered for his seminal contributions to topology, and Ulisse Dini, a leading expert on function theory. Bianchi was also greatly influenced by the geometrical ideas of Bernhard Riemann and by the work on transformation groups of Sophus Lie and Felix Klein. Bianchi became a professor at the Scuola Normale Superiore in Pisa in 1896, where he spent the remainder of his career. At Pisa, his colleagues included the talented Ricci. In 1890, Bianchi and Dini supervised the dissertation of the noted analyst and geometer Guido Fubini.

In 1898, Bianchi worked out the Bianchi classification of nine possible isometry classes of three-dimensional Lie groups of isometries of a (sufficiently symmetric) Riemannian manifold. As Bianchi knew, this is essentially the same thing as classifying, up to isomorphism, the three-dimensional real Lie algebras. This complements the earlier work of Lie himself, who had earlier classified the complex Lie algebras.

Through the influence of Luther P. Eisenhart and Abraham Haskel Taub, Bianchi's classification later came to play an important role in the development of the theory of general relativity. Bianchi's list of nine isometry classes, which can be regarded as Lie algebras, Lie groups, or as three-dimensional homogeneous (possibly nonisotropic) Riemannian manifolds, are now often called collectively the Bianchi groups.

In 1902, Bianchi rediscovered what are now called the Bianchi identities for the Riemann tensor, which play an even more important role in general relativity. (They are essential for understanding the Einstein field equation.) According to Tullio Levi-Civita, these identities had first been discovered by Ricci in about 1889, but Ricci apparently forgot all about the matter, which led to Bianchi's rediscovery. However, the contracted Bianchi identities, which are sufficient for the proof that the divergence of the Einstein tensor always vanishes, had been published by Aurel Voss in 1880.

== Publications ==
=== Articles ===
- Bianchi, Luigi (1902), "Sui simboli a quattro indici e sulla curvatura di Riemann", Rend. Acc. Naz. Lincei (in Italian), 11 (5): 3–7

=== Books ===
- Luigi, Bianchi (1894), Lezioni di geometria differenziale (three volumes) (in Italian), vol. primo (1893−1900), Pisa: E. Spoerri
- Luigi, Bianchi (1899), Vorlesungen über Differentialgeometrie (in German), Leipzig: B.G. Teubner
- Lezioni sulla teoria dei gruppi di sostituzioni e delle equazioni algebriche secondo Galois, Pisa 1899
- Lezioni sulla teoria delle funzioni di variabile complessa e delle funzioni ellittiche 1916
- Bianchi, Luigi (1918). Lezioni sulla teoria dei gruppi continui finiti di trasformazioni. Pisa: E. Spoerri. OCLC 4383253.
- Lezioni sulla teoria dei numeri algebrici e principi d'aritmetica analitica, 1921

== See also ==
- Contracted Bianchi identities

== Sources ==
- Hilton, H. (1929). "Luigi Bianchi". J. London Math. Soc. 4: 79–80. doi:10.1112/jlms/s1-4.1.79.
- O'Connor, J. J. & Robertson, E. F. "Luigi Bianchi". MacTutor History Archive.
- Scorza, G. (1930). "In memoria di Luigi Bianchi". Annali della Scuola Normale Superiore di Pisa - Classe di Scienze. 1 (in Italian). 6 (2): 3–27.
- Luigi Bianchi at the Mathematics Genealogy Project
