= Semiclassical gravity =

Physical theory with matter as quantum fields but gravity as a classical field

Semiclassical gravity is an approximation to the theory of quantum gravity in which one treats matter and energy fields as being quantum and the gravitational field as being classical.

In semiclassical gravity, matter is represented by quantum matter fields that propagate according to the theory of quantum fields in curved spacetime. The spacetime in which the fields propagate is classical but dynamical. The dynamics of the theory is described by the semiclassical Einstein equations, which relate the curvature of spacetime that is encoded by the Einstein tensor $G_{\mu\nu}$ to the expectation value of the energy–momentum tensor $\hat T_{\mu\nu}$ (a quantum field theory operator) of the matter fields, i.e.

$$G_{\mu\nu} = \frac{8 \pi G}{c^4} \left\langle \hat T_{\mu\nu} \right\rangle_\psi,$$

where G is the gravitational constant, and $\psi$ indicates the quantum state of the matter fields.

== Energy–momentum tensor ==
There is some ambiguity in regulating the energy–momentum tensor, and this depends upon the curvature. This ambiguity can be absorbed into the cosmological constant, the gravitational constant, and the quadratic couplings

$\int \sqrt{-g} R^2 \, d^dx$ and $\int \sqrt{-g} R^{\mu\nu} R_{\mu\nu} \, d^dx.$

There is another quadratic term of the form

$$\int \sqrt{-g} R^{\mu\nu\rho\sigma} R_{\mu\nu\rho\sigma} \, d^dx,$$

but in four dimensions this term is a linear combination of the other two terms and a surface term. See Gauss–Bonnet gravity for more details.

Since the theory of quantum gravity is not yet known, it is difficult to precisely determine the regime of validity of semiclassical gravity. However, one can formally show that semiclassical gravity could be deduced from quantum gravity by considering N copies of the quantum matter fields and taking the limit of N going to infinity while keeping the product GN constant. At a diagrammatic level, semiclassical gravity corresponds to summing all Feynman diagrams that do not have loops of gravitons (but have an arbitrary number of matter loops). Semiclassical gravity can also be deduced from an axiomatic approach.

== Experimental status ==
There are cases where semiclassical gravity breaks down. For instance, if M is a huge mass, then the superposition

$$\frac{1}{\sqrt{2}} \big(|M \text{ at } A\rangle + |M \text{ at } B\rangle\big),$$

where the locations A and B are spatially separated, results in an expectation value of the energy–momentum tensor that is M/2 at A and M/2 at B, but one would never observe the metric sourced by such a distribution. Or supposing the metric is sourced by such a distribution, the collapse of the wavefunction would lead to a discontinuous change in the metric. Instead, one would observe the decoherence into a state with the metric sourced at A and another sourced at B with a 50% chance each. Extensions of semiclassical gravity that incorporate decoherence have also been studied.

== Applications ==
The most important applications of semiclassical gravity are to understand the Hawking radiation of black holes and the generation of random Gaussian-distributed perturbations in the theory of cosmic inflation, which is thought to occur at the very beginning of the Big Bang.

== See also ==
- Quantum field theory in curved spacetime
