= Semiclassical =

Semiclassical may refer to:

- Semiclassical gravity, an approximation to the theory of quantum gravity
- Semiclassical physics, a theory in which one part of a system is described quantum-mechanically whereas the other is treated classically
- Beautiful music, a radio format
- Semi-classical music, a style of music of the Indian subcontinent
