= Scuola Normale Superiore =

Public higher learning institution in Italy

- Italian: Scuola Normale Superiore
- Type: Public
- Established: 1810; 216 years ago
- Founder: Napoléon Bonaparte
- Affiliations: Pisa University System
- Administrative staff: ca. 240
- Undergraduates: ca. 290
- Postgraduates: ca. 260
- Location: Pisa; Florence, Italy; 43°43′10.60″N 10°24′0.81″E
- Campus: Urban
- Website: sns.it/en

The Scuola Normale Superiore (SNS; commonly known in Italy as la Normale) is a public university in Pisa and Florence, Tuscany, Italy, currently attended by about 600 undergraduate and postgraduate (PhD) students. Together with the University of Pisa and Sant'Anna School of Advanced Studies, it is part of the Pisa University System.

It was founded in 1810 with a decree by Napoleon as a branch of the École normale supérieure in Paris, with the aim of training the teachers of the Empire to educate its citizens. In 2013 the Florentine site was added to the historical site in Pisa, following the inclusion of the Institute of Human Sciences in Florence (SUM). Since 2018 the Scuola Normale Superiore has been federated with the Sant'Anna School of Advanced Studies in Pisa, with the Institute for Advanced Studies of Pavia, and the Scuola Superiore Meridionale of Naples the only other three university institutions with special status that, in the Italian panorama, offer, in accordance with standards of excellence, both undergraduate and postgraduate educational activities.

Eminent personalities from the world of science, literature and politics have studied at the Normale, among them Giosuè Carducci, Carlo Rubbia, Enrico Fermi, Aldo Capitini, Carlo Azeglio Ciampi and Scevola Mariotti (who were in the same class), Giovanni Gronchi, Giovanni Gentile, and Alessio Figalli, in more recent times.

== History ==
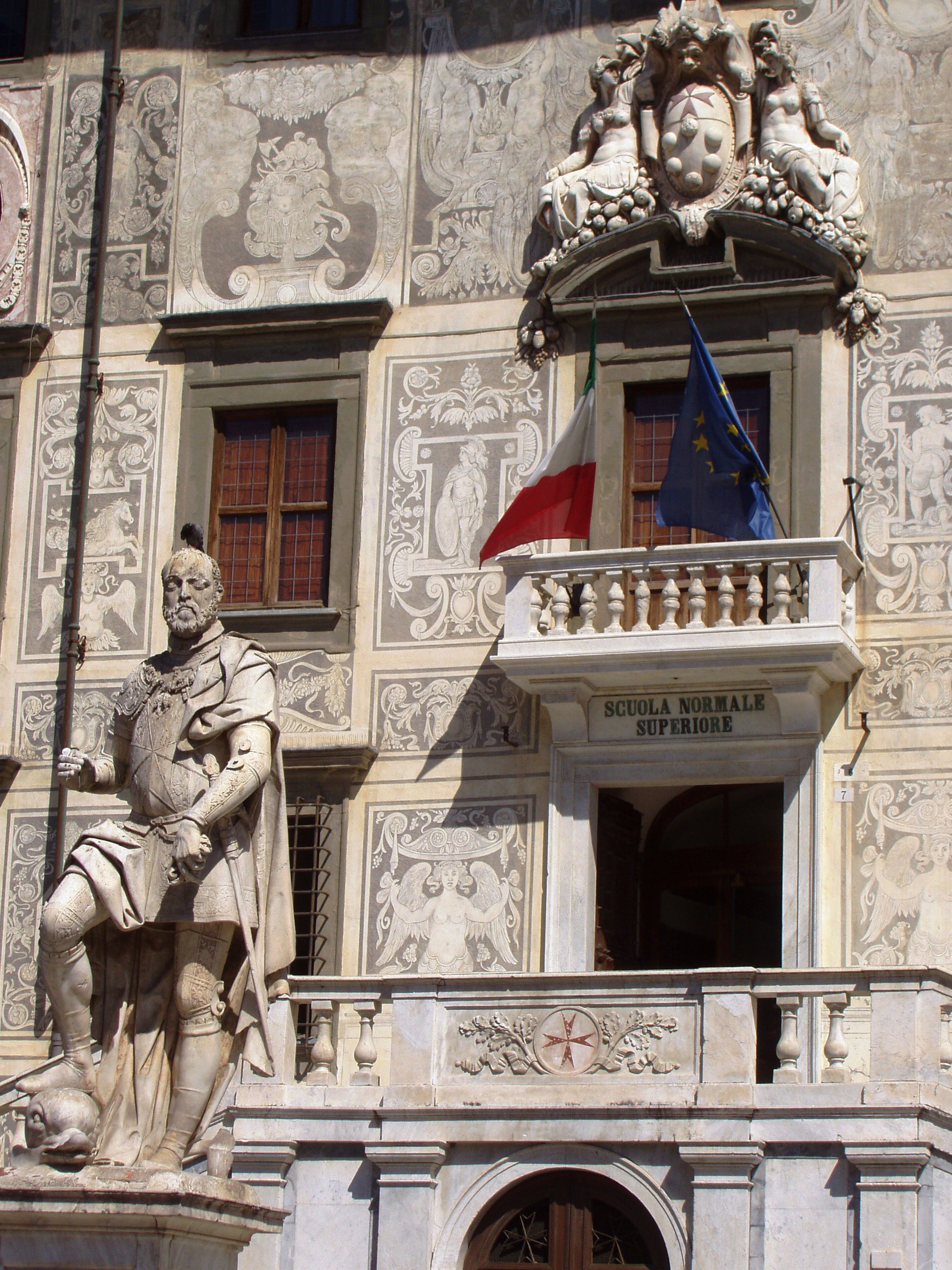
A detail of the main building, Palazzo della Carovana

The Scuola Normale Superiore was founded in 1810 by Napoleonic decree, as a twin institution of the École normale supérieure in Paris, itself dating back to the French Revolution jurisdiction.

The term école normale (scuola normale) was coined by Joseph Lakanal who, in submitting a report to the National Convention of 1794 on behalf of the Committee of Public Instruction, explained it as follows: "Normales : du latin norma, règle. Ces écoles doivent être en effet le type et la règle de toutes les autres." "Normal : from the Latin norma , rule. These schools must indeed be the kind and rule of all others."

=== The Napoleonic period ===
The Napoleonic decree of 18 October 1810, concerning "public education establishments" in Tuscany – a province of the French empire since 1807 – established an "Academic student residence" in Pisa for university students. Twenty-five places were made available for students of the Faculties of Arts and Sciences, to create a branch of the Parisian École normale supérieure in countries where the use of the Italian language was authorized.

The Scuola Normale Superiore of Pisa was thus established at the behest of Napoleon. The term "Normale" refers to its primary teaching mission, that is to train high school teachers to educate citizens according to coherent teaching and methodological "norms".

On 22 February 1811, the first call was issued, but the Pisa-based Normale began its activity only in 1813, when the first students of Arts and Sciences attended the Scuola. The first site of the Scuola was the convent of San Silvestro in Pisa: it was a student residence halfway between a military order and a convent, in which the life of the students was characterized by strict disciplinary regulations similar to those of the French Scuola of reference regarding admissions, occupations, punishments, rewards and even student clothing. Following the model of the École normale supérieure, the Scuola was entrusted to a "Director", assisted by the "Sub-director" and by the "Economo", in charge of administration, supervision of studies and the safeguarding of order.

The Normale was reserved at that time to the best high school students, aged between 17 and 24, who during their two years of studies also obtained degrees at the faculties of Arts and Sciences of the Imperial University. The students had particular commitments and were obliged to take additional courses: they were supervised by four "ripetitori", chosen by the Director among the students of the Normale, who "repeated" the university lessons daily and coordinated the "conferences", which were a sort of seminar. With this qualifying training, after graduation the students committed themselves to teaching in secondary schools for at least ten years.

The Napoleonic Scuola Normale had a short life: the only academic year was 1813/14, during which the physicist Ranieri Gerbi was director. On 6 April 1814, Napoleon signed the act of abdication: the return of Grand Duke Ferdinand III to the throne of Tuscany coincided with the closure of the Scuola despite the various attempts to save it in the name of its function.

=== The grand-ducal period ===
The period of closure of the Scuola after the Napoleonic phase was actually quite short. The Grand Duke's decree of 22 December 1817 re-established the ancient Ordine dei Cavalieri di Santo Stefano (the Order of the Knights of St. Stephen) in Pisa: in 1843 the Council of the Order proposed to establish a "boarding school for young nobles" in the Palazzo della Carovana together with a Scuola Normale. It has to be said that even in the previous period novice Knights were often students of the University of Pisa and therefore the Palazzo was already, in effect, a "noble college".

To study the feasibility of the new project, Grand Duke Leopold II of Lorraine nominated a commission, which re-established the original function of the Scuola Normale Superiore, that of preparing secondary school teachers. On 28 November 1846, a grand-ducal Motuproprio established the Scuola Normale Toscana, also called Imperial Regia Scuola Normale (because it was connected to the Austrian system). On 15 November 1847, the new headquarters in Palazzo della Carovana were inaugurated.

The new Scuola was "theoretical and practical", intended to "train teachers of secondary schools"; it was a boarding school that offered ten free places (with advantages reserved for the Knights of the Order), which could be accessed by call at the age of eighteen, as well as other paid places.

The boarding school was attended exclusively by students of philosophy and philology, while students of physical and mathematical sciences at the university were aggregated to the Scuola: the latter, however, were required to attend the pedagogy course and to practice teaching by doing teacher training in schools, in keeping with a strong professional connotation which was later to be abandoned. The course of studies lasted three years.

In the grand-ducal period the Scuola was affected by the political climate: following the enthusiasm of the Risorgimento, the fear of subversive movements and tumults led to reactionary and confessional attitudes much lamented by the students themselves, including Giosuè Carducci, who was a student there between 1853 and 1856.

=== The post-unification period ===
With the new unified state, the legislative and administrative structure of the Savoy Kingdom was extended to the whole of Italy. The Italian school system was therefore regulated for over sixty years by the Casati law of 1859, originally issued for the Piedmontese and Lombard institutions: based on a centralized model, it gave private bodies the possibility to provide education, at the same time establishing the "diritto dello Stato all’insegnamento universitario"(the right of the State regarding university education) as well as the right to 'supervise' all the levels of the school system.

In Tuscany the provisional government (1859–60) tried to protect the most illustrious local traditions, such as the Normale. After a long debate, in the Senate and in the press, on the opportuneness of maintaining this unique and anomalous institution, in 1862 it was officially named "Scuola Normale del Regno d'Italia".

Various draft laws were submitted to the Camera to establish the Pisan model by extending it to other universities or to reorganize and expand the Scuola Normale of Pisa. But the new unified State, engaged in financial measures and public works deemed to be more urgent, approved, with the decree of 17 August 1862, only some modifications to the Scuola's regulations, so that it could continue to function as a Scuola Normale italiana.

The "new" Normale was introduced into the national legal system by the Matteucci Regulations of 1862, which eliminated any religious and confessional aspects, in line with the secular orientation of Italian politics. The years of study became four by ministerial decree in 1863, and a new organizational structure was established.

At the educational level, the board of directors was divided into two "sections", Letters and Philosophy and Physics-Mathematics, formed by the relative teaching staff; the latter sections were the forerunners of the current Faculties, under the control of the "Director of Studies".

The publishing activity of the Scuola began with the foundation of the two journals (Annali della classe di scienze in 1871 and Annali della classe di lettere e filosofia in 1873). With the development of the postgraduate course, the Scuola was increasingly taking on the function, as well as of a university college, of a higher institute of scientific education and research. At the political level the role of the "President" of the board of directors was defined as the authority responsible for the moral, educational and economic governance of the Scuola. Finally, at an organizational level, there was the increasingly important role of the Provveditore-Economo, who managed the services as well as the human and financial resources, and had disciplinary jurisdiction over the students. The Matteucci regulations followed those issued by Education Minister Coppino in 1877, establishing the opening of the boarding school also to the section of Sciences and simplifying the complex structure of the previous "Regulations of studies and examinations".

=== The Gentile Reform ===
In 1927, three years after the entry into force of the Gentile Reform, new regulations of the Scuola Normale were approved, which removed its qualification function while maintaining that of "preparing for teaching in secondary schools and for the examinations which award qualifications for such teaching" and of promoting postgraduate studies, accessible by all graduates at national level.

Nationalist propaganda also took hold within the Normale and the control of the Regime became increasingly more invasive, up until the first serious episode of repression, with the arrest in 1928 of three normalisti for anti-Fascist activity. To deal with the disturbances caused by the political events and the decline of the Scuola, which had increasingly fewer students, the philosopher Giovanni Gentile, a normalista, as well as a prominent figure of Italian Fascism, ideologue of the Regime and minister of education, was nominated as commissioner; he later became director of the Normale, in 1928.

Gentile carried out a structural revision of the institution so that it would acquire national importance; to this end he oversaw the expansion of the headquarters and a considerable increase in the number of students and internal activities. His authority, together with the consensus of the Regime, allowed him to find means and collaboration for his project. Meanwhile, the relationship between the State and the Church inaugurated by the Lateran Treaty facilitated negotiations with the archbishopric to obtain the availability of the Puteano College building which, together with that of the Timpano, would later be used to house the young normalisti while the expansion of the Palazzo della Carovana took place.

The Normale Gentiliana, recognized by the Royal Decree of 28 July 1932, was inaugurated on 10 December. Equipped with a new Statute, the Scuola became an independent higher education institution, albeit still connected to the University of Pisa, and acquired legal status and administrative, educational and disciplinary autonomy. The Normale, affirming its uniqueness in the Italian school system, was expanded above all to educate an increasingly more selected cultural élite.

In 1938 the Scuola Normale, like all the universities of the Italian Kingdom, endorsed the racial laws, which affected students and teaching staff. The Normale at that time still had many free-spirited souls in its midst: it was also the Scuola of Carlo Azeglio Ciampi – who, a few years from then, would join the Resistance – and formerly of Aldo Capitini, theorist of non-violence and firm opponent of the Fascist Regime.

=== The war and post-war period ===
The Scuola Normale continued its activity despite the Second World War, although with some regulatory limitations and many practical difficulties. In the meantime, also after the issuing of the racial laws, the dissent towards the Regime was becoming increasingly more evident among students and teaching staff.

With the deposition of Mussolini by the Grand Council on 25 July 1943, the Normale remained under German domination, since geographically it belonged to the territory of the Republic of Salò.

After the tragic air raid on Pisa on 31 August 1943, the new director, Luigi Russo, threatened with arrest for political reasons, had to leave the city and was replaced by the mathematician Leonida Tonelli, who protected the library and the furnishings of the Palazzo della Carovana, transformed into German barracks, and transferred the most important collections to the nearby Certosa di Calci.

On 2 September 1944 the city was liberated, but Palazzo della Carovana was requisitioned by the Anglo-American army: students and teaching staff were relegated to the Puteano College. [Luigi Russo, reinstated as director, continued the work of safeguarding the material of the Scuola and of its library, while the temporary site resumed its activities.

On 25 September 1945, the Palazzo was liberated and, in addition to the restoration of the building, it was decided to issue a call for seventy places for veteran or partisan students. Luigi Russo and Leonida Tonelli initiated a long awareness campaign that allowed them to find financial resources, including contributions not coming from the state, and to create a heritage through donations and purchases, in accordance with a policy that would continue in the following years.

The post-war Normale was also the era of women: seventy years from the admittance of the first woman to the Normale, in 1959 a "Female Section" was finally established, with headquarters in Palazzo del Timpano, to enable women to lead a collegial life within the Scuola.

=== From the post-war period to today ===
In the 1960s, the Scuola Normale faced the challenges of the "university for the masses". Between 1964 and 1977, under the firm management of Gilberto Bernardini, it affirmed its original vocation for the pure disciplines, renouncing the management of the medical and juridical Colleges (to which the Collegio Pacinotti for applied sciences had been added) : the process that would lead to the establishment of the Sant'Anna School of Advanced Studies began from the latter Colleges.

Between 1967 and 1968 students and teachers of the Normale took part in the protests that had started in Pisa and had spread throughout Italy; at the Normale not only was the entire university system challenged, but also the approach of the Scuola and its fundamental regulations. The difficult dialogue between the institution and its students gave rise to the 1969 Statute, from which the new educational framework of the Scuola and the profile of Institute of Scientific Higher Education emerged: in particular, a significant increase in the internal teaching staff, the foundation and the strengthening of research structures and a rise in the number of undergraduate and postgraduate students were achieved. Finally, the law of 18 June 1989 recognized the equivalence of the Scuola's post-graduate diploma to that of PhDs issued by Italian universities.

In the academic year 2014/2015 the teaching curriculum for the postgraduate courses was expanded thanks to the merger with the Istituto di Scienze Umane di Firenze (SUM) (the Institute of Human Sciences of Florence, SUM), now named Department of Political and Social Sciences of the Normale. In 2018 the Normale was federated with the Sant'Anna School of Advanced Studies in Pisa and with the University Institute of Advanced Studies in Pavia, to offer new educational opportunities that could integrate the skills of the three institutions in certain areas such as economic-political disciplines and the study of the physical-chemical dynamics that influence climate change and the repercussions in the agri-food sector. Following the merger between the Scuola Normale Superiore of Pisa and the Istituto Italiano di Scienze Umane (the Italian Institute of Human Sciences), Palazzo Strozzi in Florence and the Residenza Aldo Capitini were added to the buildings dedicated to the activities of the Scuola; the latter building, following its renovation, was assigned to the students of the postgraduate courses of the department.

The Palazzone di Cortona (in the province of Arezzo) must also be added to this real estate; it is a branch of the Scuola used for conferences and summer schools organized also in collaboration with other authorities and academic and research institutions.

== Academic structures ==
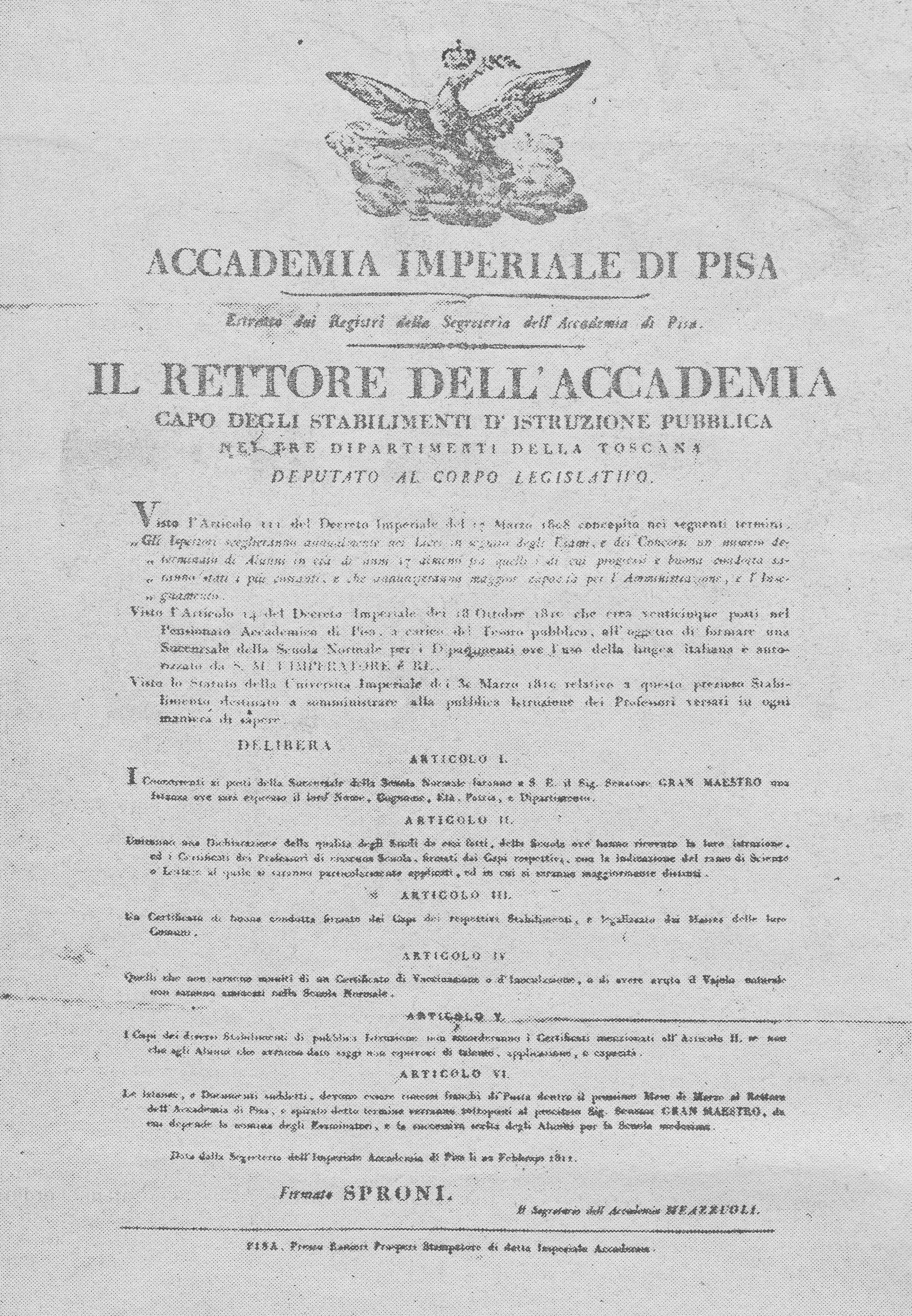
The first statute of the Scuola Normale Superiore

The Faculty of Humanities is divided into subject areas, within which the individual courses are organized. The subject areas refer to: Literature, philology and linguistics; Philosophy; History and paleography; History of Art and Archaeology; Ancient history and classical philology. The Faculty of Sciences is divided into subject areas, within which the individual courses are organized. The subject areas are:Chemistry and geology; Physics; Mathematics and computer science; Biological sciences. The Department of Political and Social Sciences covers the subject areas of political and social sciences.

== Teaching curriculum ==
The Scuola Normale Superiore offers both undergraduate education (which corresponds to the university curriculum of the bachelor's and master's degree) and postgraduate (PhD) education.

=== Undergraduate courses ===
The undergraduate courses of the SNS (Bachelor's and master's degrees) cover the teaching curriculum of three macro-disciplinary areas: Letters and Philosophy, Sciences and Political-Social Sciences (the latter only for master's degrees).The students selected through competition must follow both the courses taught at the Normale and the corresponding courses of study of the university, respecting rigorous study obligations. Studies are free of charge.

=== Postgraduate courses (PhD) ===
The Scuola Normale Superiore was the first Italian institution to create a PhD programme, in 1927. To date, the PhD courses of the Faculty of Humanities are:

- Philosophy
- History
- Italian Studies and Modern Philology
- History of Art
- Classics

The PhD courses of the Faculty of Sciences are:

- Astrochemistry
- Data Science
- Physics
- Maths
- Mathematics for finance
- Methods and models for molecular sciences
- Nanosciences
- Neuroscience

The PhD courses of the Department of Political and Social Sciences are:

- Political science and sociology
- Transnational Governance

== Admission ==
Admission to the undergraduate courses and to the postgraduate courses (PhD) takes place by competition. You can access the Normale from the first year of university, or after obtaining a three-year degree. Finally, you can be admitted to the Scuola as a postgraduate student (PhD).

For admission to the undergraduate courses, a commission formed by the research staff of the Scuola Normale and of other universities assesses candidates, attempting to identify talent for study and research. The tests, which usually take place in August and September, are written and oral, and concern the disciplinary fields chosen by candidates for their academic career. The exam topics are studied in such a way that admission to the Scuola is guaranteed not for notional and mnemonic skills but rather for originality and intuition.

For access to the first year, A-level results and any other previous qualifications are not assessed during the exam. For access to the fourth year, results obtained for the bachelor's degree and any other previous qualifications are not assessed during the exam. The selection is rigorous: only about 5% of those who take part in the competition are usually admitted. Students of the Scuola Normale Superiore do not pay any fees for their studies: university fees are reimbursed and accommodation and board are free.

For admission to the Postgraduate Course (PhD) the competition, open to graduates from all over the world, is based on qualifications and exams. Those selected receive a scholarship, as well as additional ad hoc grants for research activities in Italy and abroad.

== Campus ==
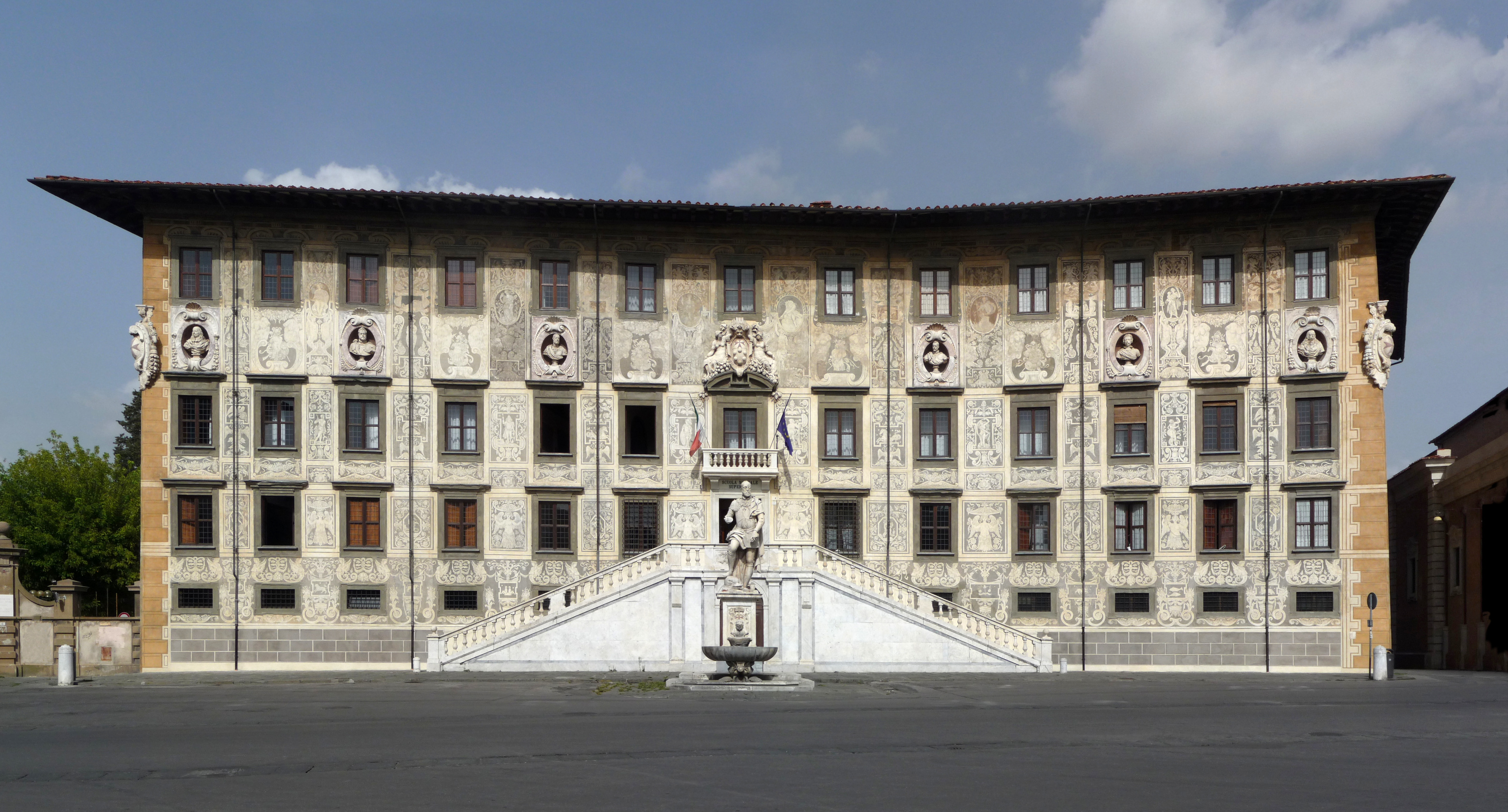
Palazzo della Carovana, Scuola Normale's main building

The Scuola Normale is located in its original historical building, called Palazzo della Carovana, in Piazza dei Cavalieri, in the medieval centre of Pisa.

=== Library ===
The Library was established at the same time as the Scuola and is an essential tool for teaching and research. It currently occupies three locations overlooking Piazza dei Cavalieri – the Palazzo dell'Orologio, the Palazzo della Canonica and a part of the Palazzo della Carovana – and, a short distance away, the location of Palazzo del Capitano. The book collection, for the most part with open shelves, has now exceeded one million volumes in total. It focuses on the disciplines under study at the Normale, and also houses texts on information science, bibliography and librarianship. In addition to the regular acquisitions, it has also been enriched by donations by various scholars connected to the Scuola; among these we can mention Eugenio Garin, Michele Barbi, Francesco Flamini, Cesare Luporini, Vittore Branca, Giorgio Pasquali, Arnaldo Momigliano, Paul Oskar Kristeller, Delio Cantimori, Sebastiano Timpanaro, Clifford Truesdell and Ettore Passerin d'Entrèves. A digital library is also being developed as part of the library service.

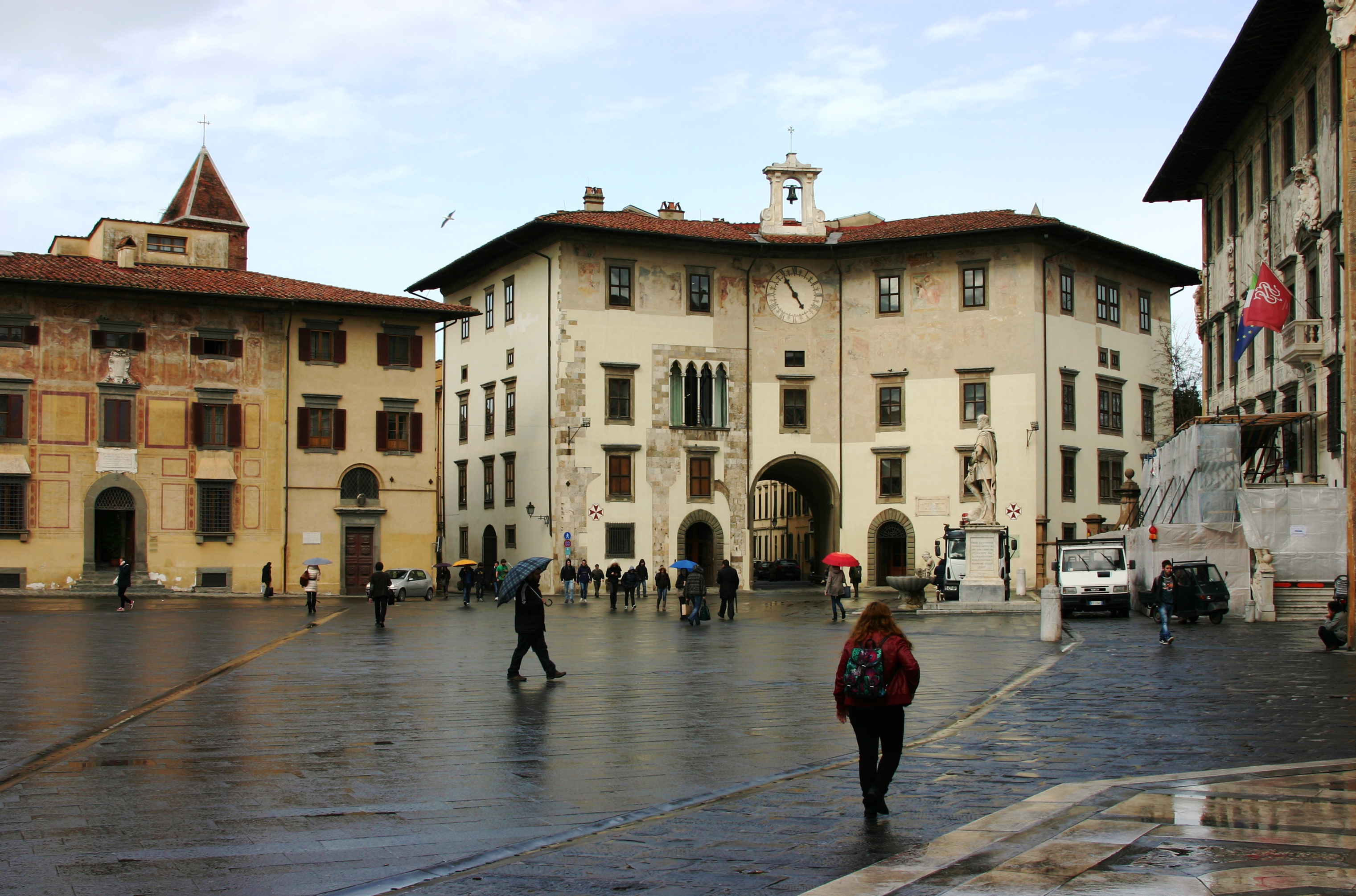
Piazza dei Cavalieri

=== Archives ===
The Archival Centre of the Scuola Normale Superiore, established in October 2013, preserves, in addition to the rich documentary heritage of the Scuola, numerous archives of 19th and 20th century cultural figures acquired through testamentary legacies, gifts and deposits but also thanks to a targeted purchasing policy. Many collections come from former students and / or former lecturers of the Scuola Normale (collections from the directors Enrico Betti, Alessandro d'Ancona, Ulisse Dini, Luigi Bianchi and Gilberto Bernardini), but also from gifts or purchases: among these, mention must be made of the Salviati archive, which, among its important documents, also preserves an autograph manuscript by Machiavelli.

=== Research centres and laboratories ===
The research centres and the laboratories operating at the Normale are:

- Bio@SNS – Laboratorio di Biologia(Biology Laboratory)
- CRM – Centro di Ricerca Matematica Ennio De Giorgi (Ennio De Giorgi Mathematics Research Centre)
- DocStAr – Documentazione Storico Artistica (Artistic Historical Documentation)
- NEST – National Enterprise for nanoScience and nanoTechnology
- SAET – Storia, Archeologia, Epigrafia, Tradizione dell'antico (History, Archaeology, Epigraphy, Tradition of the ancient)
- SMART – Strategie Multidisciplinari Applicate alla Ricerca e alla Tecnologia (Multidisciplinary Strategies Applied to Research and Technology)
- STAR – Systems and Theories for Astrochemical Research

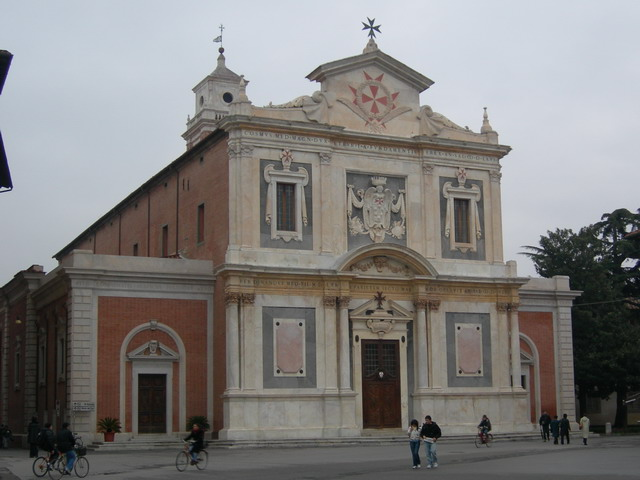
Church of the Knights of Order of Saint Stephen

=== Colleges and canteen ===
The students of the Scuola Normale, in Pisa, are currently housed in four colleges, located in the town:

- The Carducci College is located in via Turati, not far from Pisa central station; it has been owned by the Scuola since 1994. Partially restored in 2002, it is also being renovated at the moment. This building was dedicated to the illustrious poet and scholar, Giosuè Carducci, who was an undergraduate student of the faculty of humanities from 1853 to 1856 and a Nobel Prize winner for literature in 1906.
- The Fermi college, owned by the Scuola since 1993, is located a few steps away from the Palazzo della Carovana and has been used as accommodation for students since 1996. It is dedicated to the distinguished Italian physicist Enrico Fermi, a normalista as well as Nobel Prize winner for physics in 1938. It is currently closed for renovations.
- The Faedo College, which opened in 2006, is the last residential college acquired by the Scuola Normale and is shared with the Scuola Superiore Sant'Anna. The building is located in Via del Giardino, near the Palazzo di Giustizia, and is dedicated to Alessandro Faedo, a normalista who subsequently became rector of the University of Pisa, president of the National Research Council and senator.
- The Timpano College was the first real estate donation to the Scuola, in 1932: located on the Lungarno Pacinotti, it was donated to the Scuola by a singular character, the Calabrian Domenico Timpano, who had made a fortune selling, in the United States at the time of Prohibition, alcohol-based restorative products from his pharmaceutical industry. The building, damaged during the Second World War by the explosion of the nearby Ponte Solferino, was rebuilt in the 1950s, and was initially the female housing section for students of the Scuola Normale Superiore. Currently it is assigned to students and scholarship holders and is divided into three colleges: Timpano, Timpanino and Acconci (the latter acquired in 1967).

Students of the postgraduate course do not usually stay in the colleges, but receive a monthly grant for accommodation; in Florence, however, the Residenza Capitini – a building owned by the City of Florence, recently renovated with funds made available by the Ministry of Education, Universities and Research – can accommodate students of the postgraduate courses of the Department of Political and Social Sciences .

Those who have right of access to the canteen of the Scuola Normale, located on the lower floors of Palazzo D'Ancona (in the immediate vicinity of the Palazzo della Carovana, in Via Consoli del Mare 5) are: undergraduate students, Italian and international PhD students, research grant holders, scholarship holders, teaching and administrative staff, and guests of the Scuola.

== Rankings ==
University rankings

Global – Overall
- ARWU World: 501–600
- THE World: =168

- The 2023 Academic Ranking of World Universities puts this system in the 501–600 band in the world and placing between 18–24 in Italy.
- Sant'Anna School of Advanced Studies, together with Scuola Normale Superiore are named as leading institutions in Italy's six top higher education institutes by Times Higher Education World University Rankings, where for 2014–2015 was ranked at 63rd place in the world and 15th in Europe. As for 2024 rankings, Times Higher Education World University Rankings puts Scuola Normale Superiore 168th place in the world and 2nd in Italy.
- According to QS World University Rankings, Scuola Normale Superiore are part of the initiative "Invest Your Talent in Italy" which puts Italian graduate programmes on the world's stage.
- The European Research Ranking, a ranking based on publicly available data from the European Commission database puts Pisa University System among the best in Italy and best performing European research institutions.

== Notable alumni and faculty ==
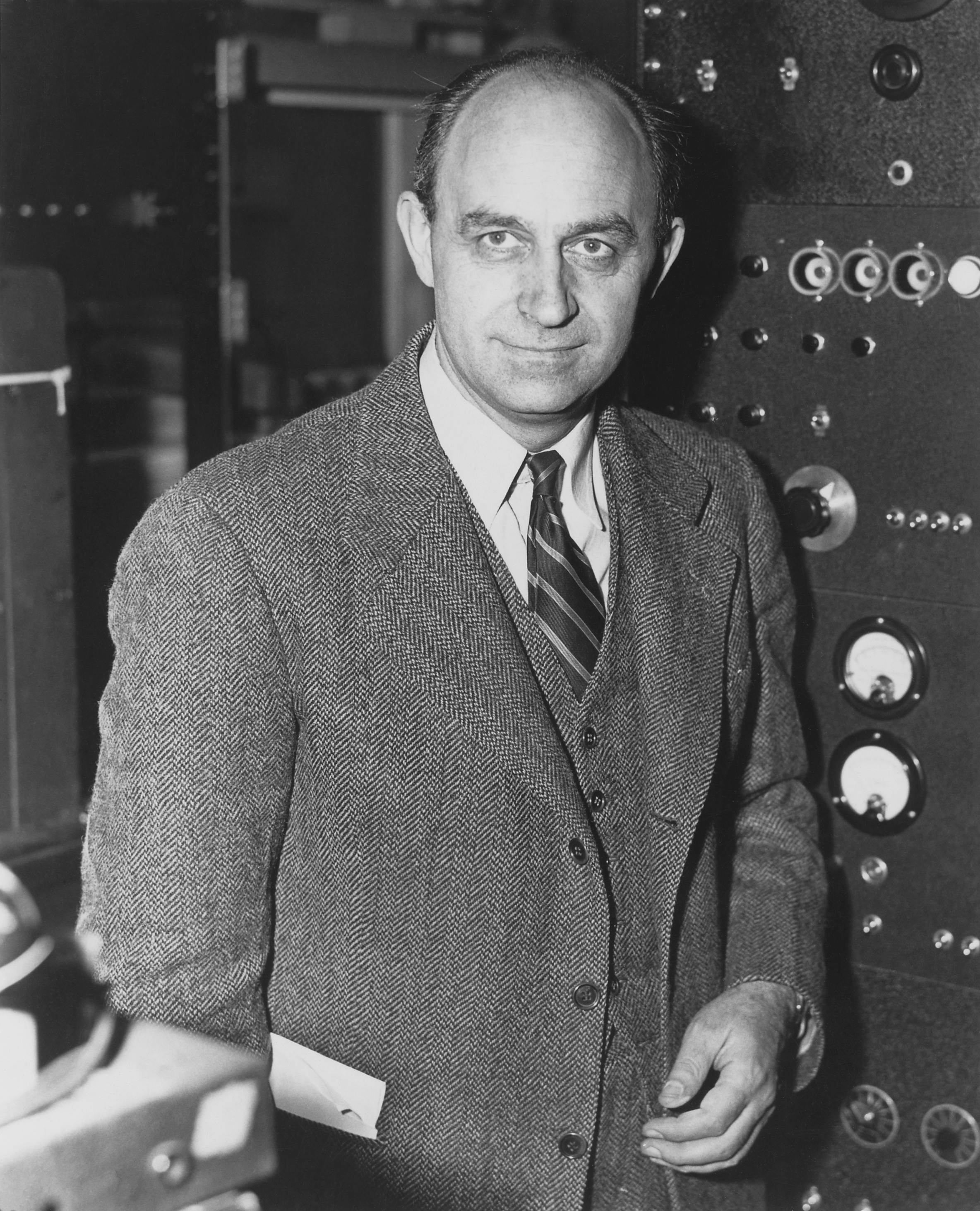
Enrico Fermi

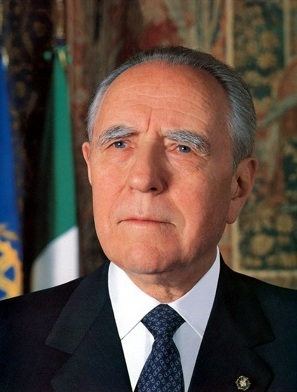
Carlo Azeglio Ciampi

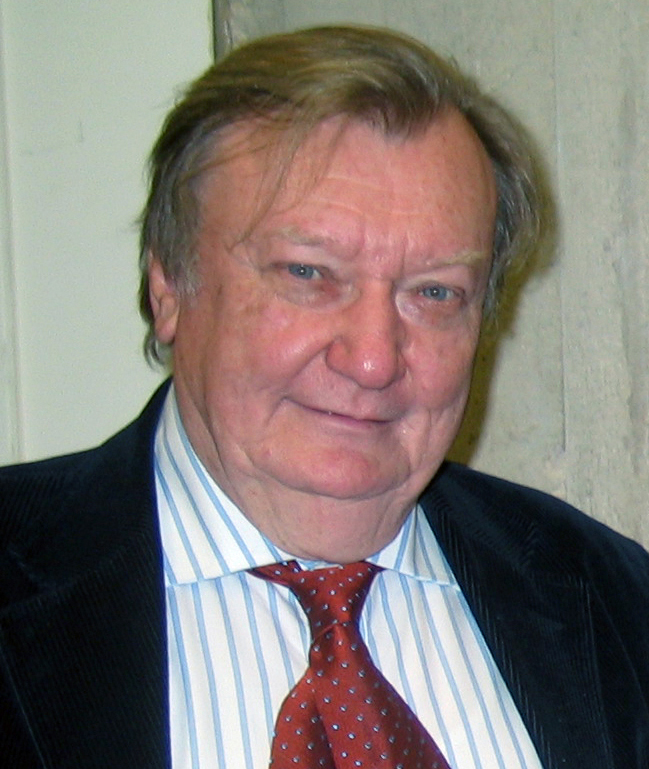
Carlo Rubbia

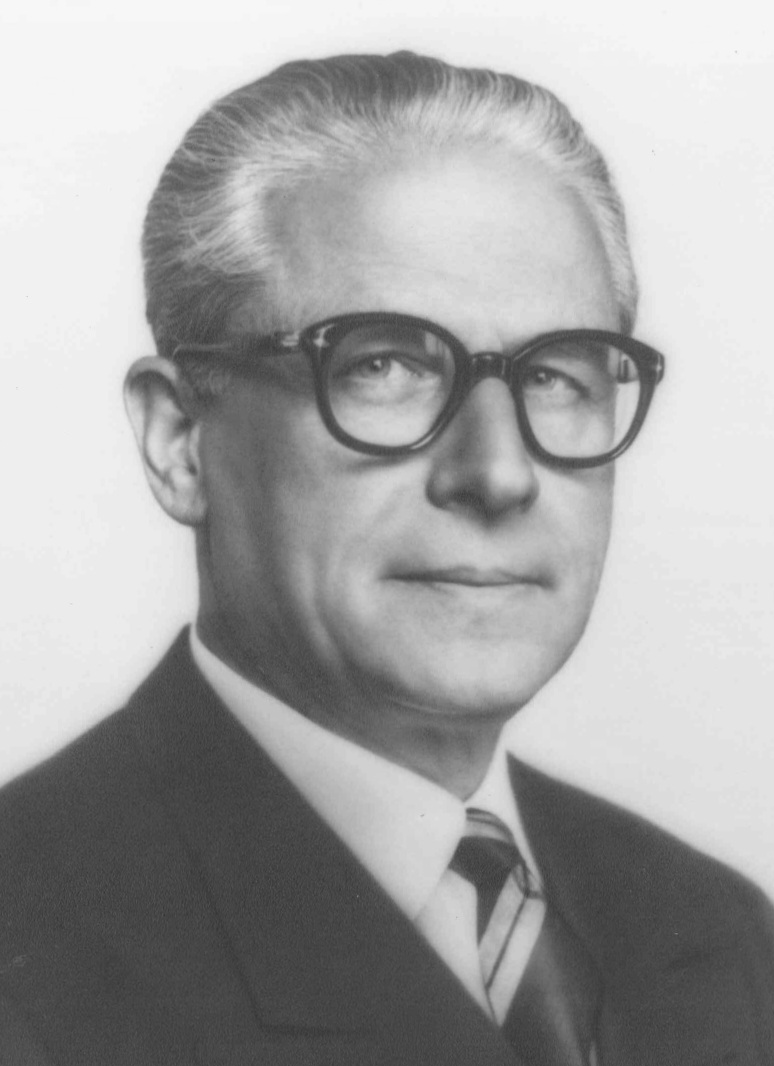
Giovanni Gronchi

Notable alumni and faculty of the Scuola Normale include:

- Aldo Andreotti, mathematician, noted for his fundamental contributions to the theory of functions of several complex variables
- Giuliano Amato, politician and former prime minister of Italy, also studied at the Collegio Medico-Giuridico of the Scuola Normale Superiore, which today is Sant'Anna School of Advanced Studies
- Michele Bacci, art historian
- Paola Barocchi, art historian
- Luigi Bianchi, mathematician, a leading member of the vigorous geometric school which flourished in Italy during the later years of the 19th century and the early years of the 20th century
- Giosuè Carducci, poet, 1906 Nobel Prize in Literature
- Antonio Cassese, jurist who specialised in public international law, President of the Special Tribunal for Lebanon, also studied at the Collegio Medico-Giuridico of the Scuola Normale Superiore, which today is Sant'Anna School of Advanced Studies
- Sabino Cassese, Professor of Administrative Law and a judge of the Constitutional Court of Italy, also studied at the Collegio Medico-Giuridico of the Scuola Normale Superiore, which today is Sant'Anna School of Advanced Studies
- Lamberto Cesari, mathematician, remembered for his achievements on the Plateau's problem, on the theory of parametric minimal surfaces, on Lebesgue measure of continuous and related other variational problems: he also worked in the field of optimal control and studied periodic solutions of systems of nonlinear ordinary differential equations by using methods of nonlinear functional analysis
- Carlo Azeglio Ciampi, Prime Minister of Italy from 1993 to 1994 and tenth President of the Italian Republic from 1999 to 2006. Until his death, he served as Senator for life in the Italian Senate
- Pietro Citati, writer and literary critic
- Ennio De Giorgi, mathematician who worked on partial differential equations and the foundations of mathematics, solved the 19th Hilbert problem, won Wolf Prize in 1990
- Enrico Fermi, physicist, 1938 Nobel Prize in Physics for his work on induced radioactivity, particularly known for his work on the development of the first nuclear reactor, Chicago Pile-1, and for his contributions to the development of quantum theory, nuclear and particle physics, and statistical mechanics. Fermi is widely regarded as one of the leading scientists of the 20th century, highly accomplished in both theory and experiment. Along with J. Robert Oppenheimer, he is frequently referred to as "the father of the atomic bomb".
- Alessio Figalli, mathematician, 2018 Fields Medal winner. He works primarily on calculus of variations and partial differential equations.
- Guido Fubini, mathematician, known for Fubini's theorem and the Fubini–Study metric
- Giovanni Gentile, minister of public education (1923) and neo-Hegelian Idealist philosopher, a peer of Benedetto Croce, described himself as 'the philosopher of Fascism', and ghostwrote A Doctrine of Fascism (1932) for Benito Mussolini, also devised his own system of philosophy, Actual Idealism, and professor at the Scuola Normale Superiore
- Carlo Ginzburg, noted historian and proponent of the field of microhistory. He is best known for his Il formaggio e I vermi (1976, English title: The Cheese and the Worms: The Cosmos of a Sixteenth Century Miller), which examined the beliefs of an Italian heretic, Menocchio, from Montereale Valcellina
- Giovanni Gronchi, politician, President of Italy from 1955 to 1962
- Eugenio Elia Levi, mathematician, noted for his fundamental contributions to group theory, the theory of partial differential equations and theory of functions of several complex variables
- Michela Marzano, philosopher, writer
- Medea Norsa, Papyrologist
- Francesco Orlando, Literary Theorist
- Carlo Rubbia, Knight Grand Cross particle physicist and inventor who shared the Nobel Prize in Physics in 1984 with Simon van der Meer for work leading to the discovery of the W and Z particles at CERN
- Francesco Ruggiero, contributor to the design of the Large Hadron Collider
- Salvatore Settis, archaeologist, former director of the Getty Center for the History of Art and the Humanities and also of the Scuola Normale itself, now President of the Scientific Committee of the Musée du Louvre
- Walter Siti, writer
- Ruxandra Sireteanu, neuroscientist
- Leonida Tonelli, mathematician, most noted for creating Tonelli's theorem, usually considered a forerunner to Fubini's theorem.
- Vito Volterra, mathematician and physicist, known for his contributions to mathematical biology and integral equations.
- Jiyuan Yu, moral philosopher noted for his work on virtue ethics

== The Associazione Normalisti and the Normale bulletin ==
Various associations of alumni and professors have been operative at the Scuola at various stages of its history. After the first initiative by the philosopher Giovanni Gentile in 1933, later revitalized in the 1950s, in 1997, at the proposal of Alessandro Faedo, the current Association was founded, simply called Associazione Normalisti.

The current president is Roberto Cerreto; previous presidents were Luigi Arialdo Radicati di Brozolo, Claudio Cesa, Franco Montanari and Umberto Sampieri. Carlo Azeglio Ciampi was an honorary president.

The Association publishes the Normale bulletin every six months or every year; the bulletin is the official organ of the association, registered at the Tribunal of Pisa; its current graphic design is the work of Paolo Peluffo, former Consigliere per la Stampa e l'Informazione del Presidente della Repubblica (press and information councillor of the president of the republic) and sottosegretario di Stato alla Presidenza del Consiglio dei Ministri (undersecretary of state at the president's office of the Cabinet) of the Monti Government. The director is Andrea Bianchi.

== Cinema and literature ==
Some narrative works of the 21st century are set at the Scuola Normale Superiore, such as L'etica dell'Aquario by Ilaria Gaspari and some pages by Walter Siti of Scuola di nudo. The Scuola Normale also features in Elena Ferrante's The Story of a New Name (2013), second installment of the four-volume work known as the Neapolitan Novels: the protagonist of the novel, Elena Greco, is admitted to the Normale and describes her years in Pisa. The Scuola Normale Superiore has also appeared in the following films: Now or Never (Ora o mai più) and Il Giocatore invisibile.

== See also ==
- Sant'Anna School of Advanced Studies
- University of Pisa
- List of Italian universities
- École normale supérieure
- Pisa
