= Horndeski's theory =

Generalized theory of gravity

Horndeski's theory is the most general theory of gravity in four dimensions whose Lagrangian is constructed out of the metric tensor and a scalar field and leads to second order equations of motion. The theory was first proposed by Gregory Horndeski in 1974 and has found numerous applications, particularly in the construction of cosmological models of Inflation and dark energy. Horndeski's theory contains many theories of gravity, including general relativity, Brans–Dicke theory, quintessence, dilaton, chameleon particle and covariant Galileon as special cases.

== Action ==
Horndeski's theory can be written in terms of an action as

$S[g_{\mu\nu},\phi] = \int\mathrm{d}^{4}x\,\sqrt{-g}\left[\sum_{i=2}^{5}\frac{1}{8\pi G_{\text{N}}}\mathcal{L}_{i}[g_{\mu\nu},\phi]\,+\mathcal{L}_{\text{m}}[g_{\mu\nu},\psi_{M}]\right]$

with the Lagrangian densities

$\mathcal{L}_{2} = G_{2}(\phi,\, X)$

$\mathcal{L}_{3} = G_{3}(\phi,\,X)\Box\phi$

$\mathcal{L}_{4} = G_{4}(\phi,\,X)R+G_{4,X}(\phi,\,X)\left[\left(\Box\phi\right)^{2}-\phi_{;\mu\nu}\phi^{;\mu\nu}\right]$

$\mathcal{L}_{5} = G_{5}(\phi,\,X)G_{\mu\nu}\phi^{;\mu\nu}-\frac{1}{6}G_{5,X}(\phi,\,X)\left[\left(\Box\phi\right)^{3}+2{\phi_{;\mu}}^{\nu}{\phi_{;\nu}}^{\alpha}{\phi_{;\alpha}}^{\mu}-3\phi_{;\mu\nu}\phi^{;\mu\nu}\Box\phi\right]$

Here $G_N$ is Newton's constant, $\mathcal{L}_m$ represents the matter Lagrangian, $G_2$ to $G_5$ are generic functions of $\phi$ and $X$ , $R,G_{\mu\nu}$ are the Ricci scalar and Einstein tensor, $g_{\mu\nu}$ is the Jordan frame metric, semicolon indicates covariant derivatives, commas indicate partial derivatives, $\Box\phi \equiv g^{\mu\nu}\phi_{;\mu\nu}$ ,$X\equiv -1/2g^{\mu\nu}\phi_{;\mu}\phi_{;\nu}$ and repeated indices are summed over following Einstein's convention.

== Constraints on parameters ==
Many of the free parameters of the theory have been constrained, $\mathcal{L}_{1}$ from the coupling of the scalar field to the top field and $\mathcal{L}_{2}$ via coupling to jets down to low coupling values with proton collisions at the ATLAS experiment. $\mathcal{L}_{4}$ and $\mathcal{L}_{5}$, are strongly constrained by the direct measurement of the speed of gravitational waves following GW170817.

== See also ==
- Classical theories of gravitation
- General relativity
- Brans–Dicke theory
- Dual graviton
- Massive gravity
- Lovelock theory of gravity
- Alternatives to general relativity
