= Ludwig Berwald =

German mathematician (1883–1942)

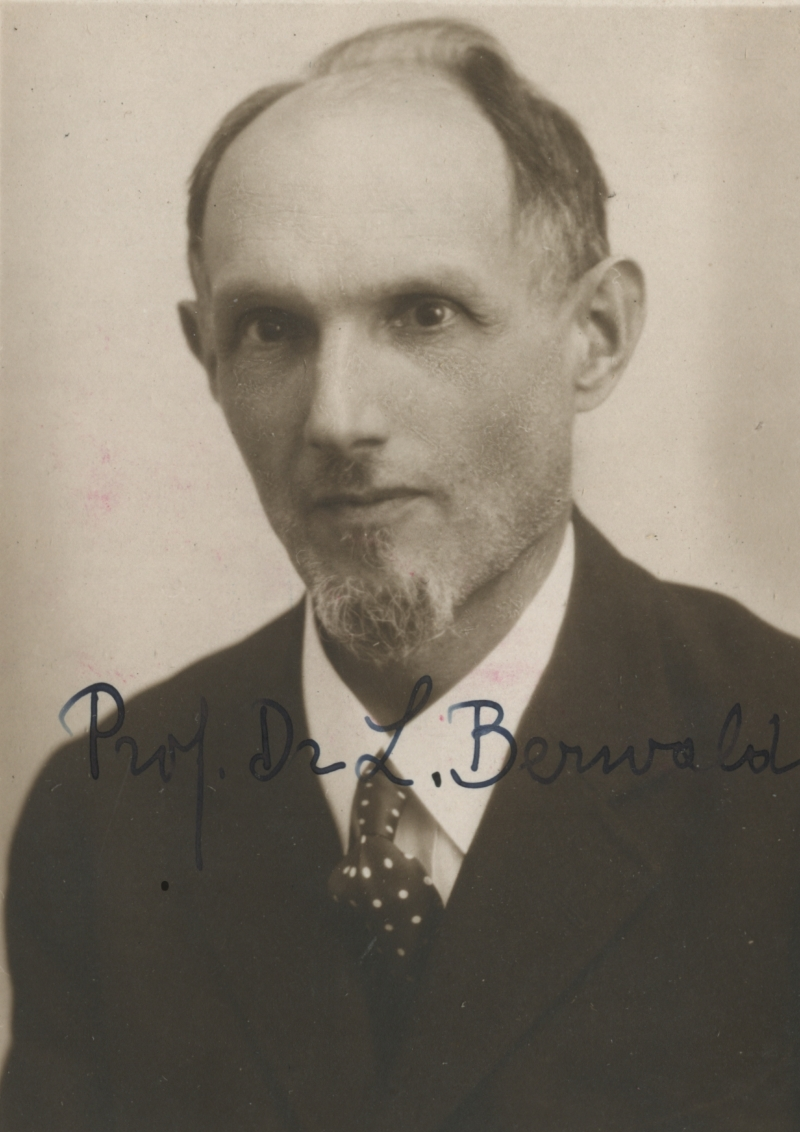
- Born: 8 December 1883; Prague, Bohemia
- Died: 20 April 1942 (aged 58); Łódź, Poland
- Known for: Differential geometry
- Spouse: Hedwig Adler (1915)
- Scientific career
- Fields: Mathematics
- Doctoral advisor: Aurel Voss

Ludwig Berwald (8 December 1883 – 20 April 1942) was a German mathematician best known for his contributions to differential geometry, especially Finsler geometry. He taught at the Ludwig-Maximilians-Universität München and the German University in Prague for 32 years, publishing 54 papers, before being deported by the Nazi SS to the Łódź Jewish Ghetto, where he and his wife Hedwig died within a year.

== Biography ==
Ludwig was one of three children of Max Berwald, an East Prussian owner of a famous bookstore, and Friedericke Fischel. They were "Jewish with Max coming from East Prussia and his wife being a native of Prague." In 1900, the family moved to Munich, where Ludwig matriculated at the Ludwig-Maximilians-Universität München in 1902. There he studied mathematics under Aurel Voss, alongside notable mathematicians Hugo Dingler and Fritz Noether, and received his PhD in 1908 for his thesis entitled Über die Krümmungseigenschaften der Brennflächen eines geradlinigen Strahlsystems und der in ihm enthaltenen Regelflächen (On the properties of curvature on the internal surfaces of rectilinear systems, and surfaces contained therein). Due to sanatorium treatment for pulmonary illness, he was unable to continue his work in Munich. Through friends, he eventually became a lecturer at the German University in Prague, achieving full professorship in 1924. There, he developed friendships and successful collaborations with fellow mathematicians Georg Pick, Paul Funk, and Élie Cartan, publishing some 54 articles which significantly advanced the field of Finsler geometry, pioneering important concepts which still bear his name such as Berwald curvature, Berwald spray, and the Berwald–Moór metric function. For extending the concept of Riemann curvature to Finsler spaces, Berwald has been credited as the founder of differential geometry of Finsler spaces. On 22 October 1941, the day after submitting his last article, the sickly 57-year-old Berwald was deported to the Łódź Ghetto in Poland in the third transportation of Jews by the German secret police. The Berwalds were two of 55 people who lived in 48 Maryśinska Street in a one-room approximately 20 by 20 feet (6 m × 6 m) with no beds. Hedwig, eight years older than her husband, died 27 March 1942; Ludwig followed 23 days later.

== Selected works ==
- Berwald, L. (1926). "Untersuchung der Krümmung allgemeiner metrischer Räume auf Grund des in ihnen herrschenden Parallelismus". Mathematische Zeitschrift. 25: 40–73. doi:10.1007/BF01283825. S2CID 121667582.
- Berwald, Ludwig (1929). "Über eine charakteristische Eigenschaft der allgemeinen Räume konstanter Krümmung mit geradlinigen Extremalen". Monatshefte für Mathematik und Physik. 36: 315–330. doi:10.1007/BF02307621. S2CID 119963413.
- Berwald, L. (1936). "On the Projective Geometry of Paths". Annals of Mathematics. 37 (4): 879–898. doi:10.2307/1968625. JSTOR 1968625.
