= Lovelock's theorem =

Theorem in general relativity

Lovelock's theorem of general relativity says that from a local gravitational action which contains only second derivatives of the four-dimensional spacetime metric, then the only possible equations of motion are the Einstein field equations. The theorem was described by British physicist David Lovelock in 1971.

== Statement ==
In four dimensional spacetime, any tensor $A^{\mu\nu}$ whose components are functions of the metric tensor $g^{\mu\nu}$ and its first and second derivatives (but linear in the second derivatives of $g^{\mu\nu}$), and also symmetric and divergence-free, is necessarily of the form

$$A^{\mu\nu}=a G^{\mu\nu}+b g^{\mu\nu}$$

where $a$ and $b$ are constant numbers and $G^{\mu\nu}$ is the Einstein tensor.

The only possible second-order Euler–Lagrange expression obtainable in a four-dimensional space from a scalar density of the form $\mathcal{L}=\mathcal{L}(g_{\mu\nu})$ is $E^{\mu\nu} = \alpha \sqrt{-g} \left[R^{\mu\nu} - \frac{1}{2} g^{\mu\nu} R \right] + \lambda \sqrt{-g} g^{\mu\nu}$

== Consequences ==
Lovelock's theorem means that if we want to modify the Einstein field equations, then we have five options.

- Add other fields rather than the metric tensor;
- Use more or fewer than four spacetime dimensions;
- Add more than second order derivatives of the metric;
- Non-locality, e.g. for example the inverse d'Alembertian;
- Emergence – the idea that the field equations don't come from the action.

== See also ==
- Lovelock theory of gravity
- Vermeil's theorem
- Einstein tensor § Uniqueness
