= Francesco Ruggiero =

Italian physicist

Francesco Ruggiero (16 August 1957 in Naples, Italy – 18 January 2007 in Geneva, Switzerland) was an Italian physicist. In 1985, he received his Ph.D. in accelerator physics from the Scuola Normale Superiore di Pisa.

He participated in the commissioning of Large Electron–Positron Collider, contributed to the Large Hadron Collider design, became the leader of the accelerator group in CERN and finally coordinated the CARE-HHH framework devoted to the LHC upgrade studies (or Super Large Hadron Collider).

For a long period, he also was associate editor of the prestigious Physical Review Accelerators and Beams journal.

A memorial symposium dedicated to Ruggiero took place at CERN on 3 October 2007.
