= Jiyuan Yu =

American philosopher (1964–2016)

- Born: July 5, 1964; Zhuji, Zhejiang, China
- Died: November 3, 2016 (aged 52); Buffalo, New York, United States

Education
- Education: University of Guelph; Scuola Normale Superiore di Pisa

Philosophical work
- Era: 20th-century philosophy
- Region: Western Philosophy, Chinese Philosophy
- School: Analytic
- Institutions: State University of New York at Buffalo
- Main interests: Ancient Greek Philosophy, Ancient Chinese Philosophy, Metaphysics, Ethics
- Notable ideas: virtue ethics, Eudaimonia, focal meaning (pros hen)

Jiyuan Yu (July 5, 1964 – November 3, 2016) was a Chinese moral philosopher noted for his work on virtue ethics. Yu was a Professor of Philosophy at the State University of New York at Buffalo starting in 1997. Prior to his professorship, Yu completed a three-year post as a research fellow at the University of Oxford, England (1994-1997). He studied in China at both Shandong University and Renmin University, in Italy at Scuola Normale Superiore di Pisa, and in Canada at the University of Guelph. His primary areas of research and teaching included Ancient Greek Philosophy (esp. Plato, Aristotle), and Ancient Chinese Philosophy (esp. Classical Confucianism).

He served on the Editorial Boards of History of Philosophy Quarterly (2002-2005), World Philosophy (2000-present), Frontiers in Philosophy (2006–present), the Chinese translation of the Complete Works of Aristotle (1988-1998), and the book series on Chinese and Comparative Philosophy (New York: Global Publications). He received the University's Exceptional Scholar (Young Investigator) Award, as well as the SUNY Chancellor's Award for Excellence in Teaching in 2002. He was appointed a 2003–2004 Fellow at the National Humanities Center and a SUNY Buffalo Humanities Institute Faculty Fellow in the spring of 2008.

Yu was Director of the Confucius Institute at SUNY Buffalo. He was a Wu Yuzhang Chair Professor (2007-2009) at Renmin University, and a Changjiang Chair Professor at Shandong University. Yu also served as President (2012-2013) and Executive Director (2012-2016) of the International Society for Chinese Philosophy (ISCP).

On November 3, 2016, Yu died from cancer in Buffalo, New York at age 52.

== Bibliography ==
- "Transmitting and Innovating in Confucius: Analects 7:1", Asian Philosophy 22 (4), 2012, 374-386
- "The Practicality of Ancient Virtue Ethics: Greece and China" in Confucianism and Virtue Ethics, eds. Michael Slote and Stephen Angle, Routledge, 2013, 117-140; revised and reprinted from Dao, 9(3), 2010, 289-230.
- "Living Well and Acting Well: An Ambiguity in Aristotle’s Theory of Happiness", Skepsis 29 (1), 2008, 136-151
- The Ethics of Confucius and Aristotle: Mirrors of Virtues, New York/London: Routledge, 2007 (paper cover, 2009)
- The Structure of Being in Aristotle's Metaphysics, Dordrecht: Kluwer, 2003
- Rationality and Happiness: from the Ancients to the Early Medievals (co-editor with Jorge Gracia), University of Rochester Press, 2003
- Uses and Abuses of the Classics: Western Interpretation of Greek Philosophy (co-editor with Jorge Gracia), Ashgate, 2004
- A Dictionary of Western Philosophy: English and Chinese (co-compiler with Nick Bunnin), People's Press, 2001, pp. 1191
- The Blackwell Dictionary of Western Philosophy, Oxford: Blackwell, 2004 ISBN 1-4051-0679-4
- "Ethics in Greek Philosophy and Chinese Philosophy", in special issue of the Journal of Chinese Philosophy, September 2002, Blackwell
- "Two Conceptions of Hylomorphism in Metaphysics ZH", in Oxford Studies in Ancient Philosophy (XV, 1997, 119-145)
- "Virtue: Aristotle and Confucius", in Philosophy East and West (Vol.48, no.2, 1998, 323-347)
- "The Language of Being: Between Aristotle and Chinese Philosophy", in International Philosophical Quarterly (Vol.39, no.4, 1999, 439-454)
- "Justice in the Republic: An Evolving Paradox", in History of Philosophy Quarterly (Vol.17, No.2, 2000, 121-141)
- "Saving the Phenomena: An Aristotelian Method in Comparative Philosophy" (With N.Bunnin), in Two Roads to Wisdom?: Chinese and Analytical Philosophical Traditions, Mou (ed.), Open Court, 2001, 293-312
- "Xiong Shili's Metaphysics of Virtue", in Contemporary Chinese Philosophy, eds, C-Y Cheng and N.Bunnin, Blackwell Publishers (2002, 127-146).
- "Aristotle on Eudaimonia: After Plato's Republic", in History of Philosophy Quarterly (Vol.18, No. 2, 2001, 115-138)
- "The Moral Self and the Perfect Self in Aristotle and Mencius", in Journal of Chinese Philosophy (Vol.28, no.3, 2001, 235-256)
- "The Identity of Form and Essence in Aristotle", in Southern Journal of Philosophy (Vol. XXXIX, 2001, 299-312)
- "What is the Focal Meaning of Being in Aristotle?", in Aperion: A Journal for Ancient Philosophy and Science (Vol. XXXIV, no.3, 2001, 205-231)
- "Introduction: Towards a Greek-Chinese Comparative Ethics", in Ethics in Greek Philosophy and Chinese Philosophy, special issue of JCP, September 2002.
- "Aristotelian Mean and Confucian Mean", in Ethics in Greek Philosophy and Chinese Philosophy, special issue of JCP, September 2002.
- "Rationality and Happiness" (with Gracia), in Rationality and Happiness: from the Ancients to the Early Medievals, 1-15
- "Will Aristotle Count Socrates Happy?", in Rationality and Happiness: from the Ancients to the Early Medievals, 51-73
- "MacIntyre's Interpretation of Aristotle", in Uses and Abuses of the Classics: Western Interpretation of Greek Philosophy

== See also ==
- Virtue ethics
- Noesis
