= Contracted Bianchi identities =

Identities in general relativity

In general relativity and tensor calculus, the contracted Bianchi identities are:

$$\nabla_\rho R^\rho_\mu = \frac{1}{2} \nabla_\mu R$$

where $R^\rho_\mu$ is the Ricci tensor, $R$ the scalar curvature, and $\nabla_\rho$ indicates covariant differentiation.

These identities are named after Luigi Bianchi, although they had been already derived by Aurel Voss in 1880, and independently by Gregorio Ricci-Curbastro in 1889. In the Einstein field equations, the contracted Bianchi identity ensures consistency with the vanishing divergence of the matter stress–energy tensor.

== Proof ==
Start with the Bianchi identity

$R_{abmn;\ell} + R_{ab\ell m;n} + R_{abn\ell;m} = 0.$

Contract both sides of the above equation with a pair of metric tensors:

$$g^{bn} g^{am} (R_{abmn;\ell} + R_{ab\ell m;n} + R_{abn\ell;m}) = 0,$$

$$g^{bn} (R^m {}_{bmn;\ell} - R^m {}_{bm\ell;n} + R^m {}_{bn\ell;m}) = 0,$$

$$g^{bn} (R_{bn;\ell} - R_{b\ell;n} - R_b^m {}_{n\ell;m}) = 0,$$

$$R^n_{n;\ell} - R^n_{\ell;n} - R^{nm}_{n\ell;m} = 0.$$

The first term on the left contracts to yield a Ricci scalar, while the third term contracts to yield a mixed Ricci tensor,

$$R_{;\ell} - R^n_{\ell;n} - R^m_{\ell;m} = 0.$$

The last two terms are the same (changing dummy index $n$ to $m$) and can be combined into a single term which shall be moved to the right,

$$R_{;\ell} = 2 R^m_{\ell;m},$$

which is the same as

$$\nabla_m R^m_\ell = \frac{1}{2} \nabla_\ell R.$$

Swapping the index labels $\ell$ and $m$ on the left side yields

$$\nabla_\ell R^\ell_m = \frac{1}{2} \nabla_m R.$$

== See also ==
- Bianchi identities
- Einstein tensor
- Einstein field equations
- General theory of relativity
- Ricci calculus
- Tensor calculus
- Riemann curvature tensor
