= Kathryn H. Kidd =

American novelist

Patricia Kathryn Helms Kidd (April 3, 1950 – December 14, 2015) was an American author. Many of her books concern the Church of Jesus Christ of Latter-day Saints (LDS Church). She co-wrote some of her works with her husband, Clark L. Kidd, and also co-wrote a novel with Orson Scott Card.

== Life and career ==
Kidd was born in New Orleans and raised in Mandeville, Louisiana. She graduated from Brigham Young University and was baptized in the LDS Church. Raised a Protestant, Kidd is quoted as converting because she wanted a patriarchal blessing, but couldn't receive one unless she was a baptized member of the LDS faith. Upon receiving her bachelor's degree, Kidd reported for the Deseret News in Salt Lake City. During this time, she became friends with Orson Scott Card, who was then an assistant editor for the official LDS magazine, The Ensign. After Kathryn married Clark Kidd, the two worked with Card on a project for Compute! Books. Clark programmed the games in a series while Kathy wrote the directions. The couple moved to Virginia in 1987. She was subsequently associate and managing editor of Meridian magazine until 2008, after which she continued writing for it and also for Nauvoo Times. She died on December 14, 2015.

== Publications ==
Kidd wrote and co-wrote with her husband several non-fiction books of practical advice geared toward fellow members of the LDS Church. These include titles such as Ward Activities for the Clueless, Food Storage for the Clueless, On My Own and Clueless: An LDS Guide to Independent Life, and A Parent's Survival Guide to the Internet. The Kidds jointly authored A Convert's Guide to Mormon Life, which won an Association of Mormon Letters Award for devotional literature. They also collaborated on a large number of articles for Meridian.

Kidd also wrote a few comedic novels about life among members of the church, including Paradise Vue and Return to Paradise, and children's books such as The Innkeeper's Daughter.

Kidd was a longtime friend of Orson Scott Card. In 1989, Card founded a Mormon publishing company with his wife and brother, called "Hatrack River Publications." Card approached Kidd to provide a novel that fit the company's themes. Kidd's novel Paradise Vue became its first publication. Other collaboration with Card included co-authoring Lovelock, the first part of a proposed trilogy.

=== Lovelock ===
Lovelock is a speculative science fiction novel co-written by both Kidd and Orson Scott Card. The novel is narrated by a scientist who takes the name of real scientist James Lovelock. The novel examines the Gaia Hypothesis through the lens of Lovelock, who is a genetically-enhanced capuchin monkey. Lovelock the monkey is assigned to examine the lives of several humans on board the Mayflower spacecraft, and in the process becomes more humanized and rebellious.

Kidd passed away before the second installment, Rasputin, could be published.

=== Paradise Vue ===
Paradise Vue takes place in an LDS ward congregation. Beneath their perfectionist façade, the Church members in Kidd's novel exhibit cruel, dark, and obsessive tendencies. The novel is a comedic LDS fiction piece.

== Works ==
=== Mayflower trilogy ===
- Lovelock (New York: TOR, 1994)

=== Paradise Vue series ===
- Paradise Vue (Hatrack River Publications, 1989)
- Return to Paradise (Hatrack River, 1997)

=== For the Clueless series ===
- Food Storage for the Clueless (Bookcraft, 2002)
- Ward Activities for the Clueless (Bookcraft, 2001)
- On My Own and Clueless: an LDS Guide to Independent Life (Bookcraft, 2000)

=== Standalone fiction ===
- The Alphabet Year (Hatrack River, 1991)
- The Wise Men of Bountiful: a Story for Children (Cedar Fort, 2005)
- The Innkeeper's Daughter (Hatrack River, 1990)
- A Convert's Guide to Mormon Life (Bookcraft, 1998)
- 52 Weeks of Recipes for Students, Missionaries, and Nervous Cooks (Deseret Book, 2007)
- A Parent's Survival Guide to the Internet (Bookcraft, 1999)

=== Manuals ===
- Compute!'s IBM PC and PCjr Games for Kids (Compute! Publications, 1984)

(All works were retrieved from the WorldCat).
