= Michele Bacci =

Italian art historian (born 1970)

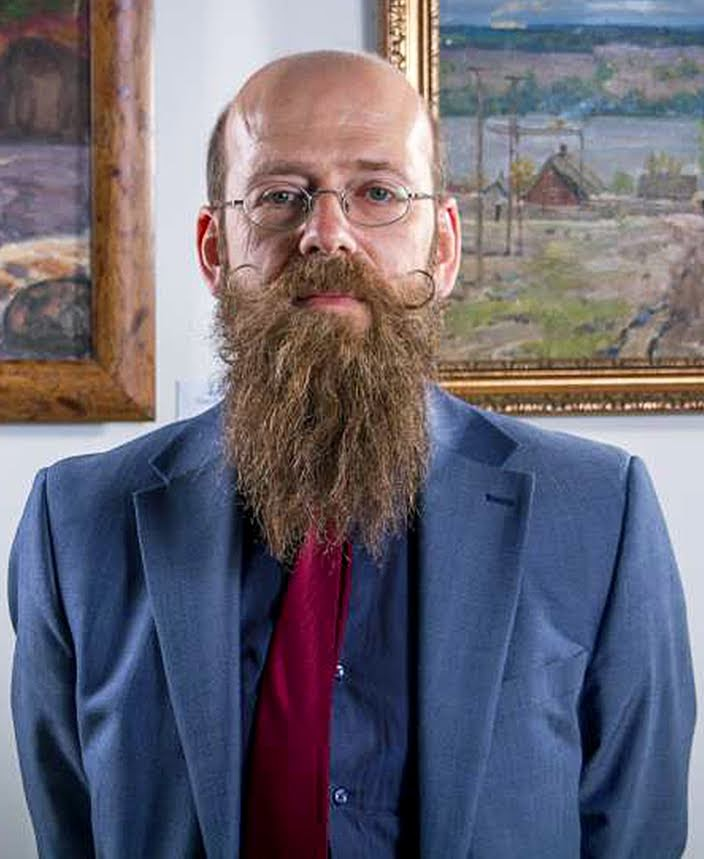
- Born: 17 June 1970 (age 56)

Michele Bacci (born 17 June 1970) is an Italian art historian. He has been professor of medieval history of art at the University of Fribourg since 2011 and a member of the Academia Europaea since 2015.

== Career ==
Michele Bacci studied art history at the Scuola Normale Superiore di Pisa and received his PhD there in 1999. Between 2002 and 2011, he was associate professor for medieval art history at the University of Siena; in 2011 he received a call to the chair for medieval art history at the University of Fribourg in Switzerland, which he has held since then. In Fribourg he is a member of the Institute for Medieval Studies. Visiting professorships and research stays brought him to, among others, the Hebrew University in Jerusalem (2009), the University of Tokyo (2010), the Scuola Normale Superiore di Pisa (since 2015), the Masaryk University in Brno (2015, 2017), the Kunsthistorisches Institut in Florenz-Max-Planck-Gesellschaft (2017-2018), and the University of Zürich (2019). Since 2010, Bacci has been a member of the international consortium team for the restoration of the Nativity Church in Bethlehem, Palestine.

== Exhibitions, projects, conferences (selection) ==
- San Nicola. Splendori d’arte d’Oriente e d’Occidente, (Castello Svevo, Bari), 2007
- Forme e caratteri della santità in Toscana nell'età dei Comuni agiografia, iconografia, istituzioni (Ministry of Education, Universities and Research (Rome)), 2004–2006
- The Holy Portulane. The Sacred Geography of Navigation in the Middle Ages (Swiss National Science Foundation), 2013
- Von Venedig zum Heiligen Land. Ausstattung und Wahrnehmung von Pilgerorten an der Mittelmeerküste (1300–1550) (Swiss National Science Foundation), 2014–2018
- Cultural Interactions in Medieval Georgia (Swiss National Science Foundation), 2017
- Royal Epiphanies. The King's Body as Image and Its Mise-en-scène in the Medieval Mediterranean (12th–14th c.) (Swiss National Science Foundation), 2017–2021
- Cultural Interactions in the Medieval Subcaucasian Region: Historiographical and Art-Historical Perspectives (Swiss National Science Foundation), 2020-2023

== Publications (selection) ==
- Il pennello dell’evangelista. Storia delle immagini sacre attribuite a san Luca, Gisem-Ets, Pisa: Gisem-ETS, 1998 (‘Piccola Biblioteca Gisem’ 14).
- «Pro remedio animae». Immagini sacre e pratiche devozionali in Italia centrale (secoli XIII e XIV), Pisa: Gisem-ETS, 2000 (‘Piccola Biblioteca Gisem’ 15).
- Investimenti per l’aldilà. Arte e raccomandazione dell’anima nel Medioevo, Bari-Roma: Laterza, 2003.
- Lo spazio dell’anima. Vita di una chiesa medievale, Bari-Roma: Laterza, 2005.
- San Nicola. Il Grande Taumaturgo, Bari-Roma: Laterza, 2009.
- The Many Faces of Christ. Portraying the Holy in the East and the West from 300 to 1300, London: Reaktion Books, 2014.
- The Mystic Cave. A History of the Nativity Church in Bethlehem, Brno-Rome: Masaryk University Press-Viella, 2017.
- Βένετο-βυζαντινές αλληλεπιδράσεις στη ζωγραφική εικόνων (1280-1450), Athens: Akademia Athinon, 2021.

Furthermore, Michele Bacci is Editor of the journal Iconographica (since 2003) and co-editor of the series MAH – Mediterranean Art Histories (since 2019). A full list of publications can be accessed here: Academy of Europe: Michele Bacci, Publications

== Memberships and awards (selection) ==
- Hanno-und-Ilse-Hahn-Preis (2016)
- Honorary Member of the Christian Archaeological Society (Χριστιανική Ἀρχαιολογική Ἑταιρεία) of Athens (since 2014)
- Elected member of the Academia Europaea (since 2015)
- Member of the International Center of Medieval Art (since 2016).
- Editorial Board of the journals Frankokratia (since 2019) and Convivium (since 2014)
- Advisory Board of the journals Revue d'histoire ecclésiastique (since 2020), Römisches Jahrbuch der Bibliotheca Hertziana (since 2020), Codex Aquilarensis (since 2012), Perspective (since 2012), Carte semiotiche (since 2011), Memorie domenicane (since 2008)
- Advisory Board of the project Magistri mediterranei. Movilidad y transferencia artística en el Mediterráneo medieval (1187–1388), Universitat autònoma, Barcelona, and Government of Spain (since 2016)
