= Fubini's theorem on differentiation =

In mathematics, Fubini's theorem on differentiation, named after Guido Fubini, is a result in real analysis concerning the differentiation of series of monotonic functions. It can be proven by using Fatou's lemma and the properties of null sets.

== Statement ==
Assume $I \subseteq \mathbb R$ is an interval and that for every natural number k, $f_k: I \to \mathbb R$ is an increasing function. If,

$$s(x) := \sum_{k=1}^\infty f_k(x)$$

exists for all $x \in I,$ then for almost any $x \in I,$ the derivatives exist and are related as:

$$s'(x) = \sum_{k=1}^\infty f_k'(x).$$

In general, if we don't suppose f_{k} is increasing for every k, in order to get the same conclusion, we need a stricter condition like uniform convergence of $\sum_{k=1}^n f_k'(x)$ on I for every n.
