= Hanno Rund =

- Born: 26 October 1925; Schwerin, German Reich
- Died: 5 January 1993 (aged 67); Tucson, Arizona
- Education: University of Cape Town
- Known for: Differential Geometry; Calculus of variations
- Scientific career
- Fields: Mathematics
- Doctoral advisor: Christian Yvon Pauc
- Doctoral students: David Lovelock

Hanno Rund (26 October 1925 in Schwerin – 5 January 1993 in Tucson, Arizona) was a German mathematician. He wrote numerous publications, including perhaps his most famous, The Hamilton-Jacobi theory in the calculus of variations. Its role in mathematics and physics.

Rund received his Ph.D. in 1950 from the University of Cape Town, South Africa. In 1952, he obtained his Habilitation at the University of Freiburg in Germany. His notable students include David Lovelock and Martin Sade.

A new permanent head for the Mathematics Department was found in 1970. Dr. Hanno Rund came from Waterloo University to the University of Arizona to take the leadership of the Department during the period between 1970 and 1978. He energetically pursued the development program that had been initiated by Cohn, adding more than a dozen new faculty members.

== Books ==
- H. Rund, The Hamilton-Jacobi theory in the calculus of variations. Its role in mathematics and physics, D. Van Nostrand Company Ltd., 1966.
- H. Rund, The Differential Geometry of Finsler Spaces, Springer, Berlin, 1959.
- Lovelock, David; Rund, Hanno (1989), Tensors, Differential Forms, and Variational Principles, Dover, ISBN 978-0-486-65840-7
