= Guido Fubini =

Italian mathematician (1879–1943)

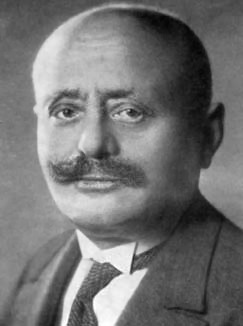
- Born: 19 January 1879; Venice
- Died: 6 June 1943 (aged 64); New York
- Education: Scuola Normale Superiore di Pisa
- Known for: Fubini's theorem Fubini's theorem on differentiation Fubini–Study metric Fubini numbers
- Scientific career
- Fields: Mathematics
- Doctoral advisor: Ulisse Dini; Luigi Bianchi

Guido Fubini (19 January 1879 – 6 June 1943) was an Italian mathematician, known for Fubini's theorem and the Fubini–Study metric.

== Life ==
Born in Venice, he was steered towards mathematics at an early age by his teachers and his father, who was himself a teacher of mathematics. In 1896 he entered the Scuola Normale Superiore di Pisa, where he studied differential geometry under Ulisse Dini and Luigi Bianchi. His 1900 doctoral thesis was about Clifford's parallelism in elliptic spaces.

After earning his doctorate, he took up a series of professorships. In 1901 he began teaching at the University of Catania in Sicily; shortly afterwards he moved to the University of Genoa; and in 1908 he moved to the Politecnico in Turin and then the University of Turin, where he stayed for a few decades.

During this time his research focused primarily on topics in mathematical analysis, especially differential equations, functional analysis, and complex analysis; but he also studied the calculus of variations, group theory, non-Euclidean geometry, and projective geometry, among other topics. With the outbreak of World War I, he shifted his work towards more applied topics, studying the accuracy of artillery fire; after the war, he continued in an applied direction, applying results from this work to problems in electrical circuits and acoustics.

In 1938, when Fubini at the age of 59 was nearing retirement, Benito Mussolini's Fascists adopted the anti-Jewish policies advocated for several years by Adolf Hitler's Nazis. As a Jew, Fubini feared for the safety of his family, and so accepted an invitation by Princeton University to teach there; he died in New York City four years later.

== Legacy ==
A main-belt asteroid, 22495 Fubini, was named in his honour.

== Publications ==
- 1920: Lezioni di analisi matematica (Società Tipografico-Editrice Nazionale, Torino)
