= Lovelock (surname) =

Lovelock is an English surname. Notable people with the surname include:

- Adam Lovelock (born 1982), Australian boxer
- Bill Lovelock (1922–2003), English songwriter and television producer
- Christopher Lovelock (1940–2008), British academic
- David Lovelock (born 1938), British theoretical physicist and mathematician
- Damien Lovelock (1954–2019), Australian musician
- Douglas Lovelock (1923–2014), English civil servant
- Irene Lovelock (1896–1974), British activist
- Jack Lovelock (1910–1949), New Zealand athlete
- James Lovelock (1919–2022), British scientist, environmentalist and futurologist
- Millie Lovelock, New Zealand musician
- Mitchell Lovelock-Fay (born 1992), Australian cyclist
- Ossie Lovelock (1911–1981), Australian sportsman
- Ray Lovelock (actor) (1950–2017), Italian actor
- William Lovelock (1899–1986), British classical composer and pedagogue
- Yann Lovelock (born 1939), British writer

Fictional characters:

- Ray Lovelock (Macross), a character in Macross
