= Hermann Vermeil =

German mathematician

- Born: 1889
- Died: 1959 (aged 69–70)
- Education: Universität Leipzig
- Known for: Vermeil's theorem
- Scientific career
- Fields: Mathematics
- Doctoral advisor: Otto Ludwig Hölder

Hermann Vermeil (1889–1959) was a German mathematician who produced the first published proof that the scalar curvature is the only absolute invariant among those of prescribed type suitable for Albert Einstein’s theory. The theorem was proved by him in 1917 when he was Hermann Weyl's assistant.

== See also ==
- Vermeil's theorem
