= Gauss–Bonnet gravity =

Theory of gravity

In general relativity, Gauss–Bonnet gravity, also referred to as Einstein–Gauss–Bonnet gravity, is a modification of the Einstein–Hilbert action to include the Gauss–Bonnet term (named after Carl Friedrich Gauss and Pierre Ossian Bonnet)

$$\int d^Dx \sqrt{-g}\, G$$,

where

$$G= R^2 - 4R^{\mu\nu}R_{\mu\nu} + R^{\mu\nu\rho\sigma}R_{\mu\nu\rho\sigma}$$.

This term is only nontrivial in 4+1D or greater, and as such, only applies to extra dimensional models. In 3+1D, it reduces to a topological surface term. This follows from the generalized Gauss–Bonnet theorem on a 4D manifold

$$\frac{1}{8\pi^2}\int d^4x \sqrt{-g}\, G = \chi(M)$$.

In lower dimensions, it identically vanishes.

Despite being quadratic in the Riemann tensor (and Ricci tensor), terms containing more than 2 partial derivatives of the metric cancel out, making the Euler–Lagrange equations second order quasilinear partial differential equations in the metric. Consequently, there are no additional dynamical degrees of freedom, as in say f(R) gravity.

Gauss–Bonnet gravity has also been shown to be connected to classical electrodynamics by means of complete gauge invariance with respect to Noether's theorem.

More generally, we may consider a

$$\int d^Dx \sqrt{-g}\, f\left( G \right)$$

term for some function f. Nonlinearities in f render this coupling nontrivial even in 3+1D. Therefore, fourth order terms reappear with the nonlinearities.

== See also ==
- Einstein–Hilbert action
- f(R, G, T) or f(R, T, G) gravity
- f(R) gravity
- Lovelock gravity
