= Fritz Noether =

German scientist and mathematician (1884–1941)

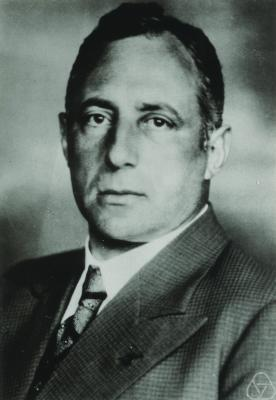
- Born: Fritz Alexander Ernst Noether; 7 October 1884; Erlangen, German Empire
- Died: 11 September 1941 (aged 56); Oryol, Russian SFSR, Soviet Union
- Cause of death: Execution by shooting
- Education: Ludwig-Maximilians-Universität München
- Known for: Herglotz–Noether theorem
- Spouse: Regine (died 1935)
- Children: Gottfried, Hermann
- Scientific career
- Fields: Mathematics
- Workplaces: Technische Hochschule Karlsruhe; Wrocław University of Science and Technology; Tomsk State University
- Thesis: Über rollende Bewegung einer Kugel auf Rotationsflächen (1909)
- Doctoral advisor: Aurel Voss
- Doctoral students: Helmut Heinrich

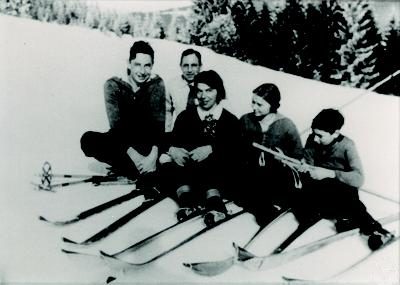
Left to right: Herrmann, Fritz, and Regine Noether, Lotte and Gottfried Heisig; c. 1930–1931 in the Giant Mountains.

Fritz Alexander Ernst Noether (German: [ˈnøːtɐ]; 7 October 1884 – 11 September 1941) was a German mathematician who emigrated from Nazi Germany to the Soviet Union. He was later executed by the NKVD.

He was born to the mathematician Max Noether and was the younger brother of mathematician Emmy Noether.

== Biography ==
Fritz Noether's father Max Noether was professor of mathematics at the University of Erlangen. Starting in 1904, Fritz studied mathematics at the University of Erlangen and then at the Ludwig-Maximilians-Universität München, where he obtained his doctorate in 1909 with a dissertation about rolling movements of a sphere on surfaces of rotation, written under the direction of Aurel Voss. He obtained his habilitation in 1911 at the Technische Hochschule Karlsruhe.

He married in 1911 and had two children: Herman D. Noether, born 1912 who became a chemist, and Gottfried E. Noether, born 1915 who became an American statistician and educator, and later wrote a brief biography of his father.

Noether served in World War I, was wounded, and received the Iron Cross. From 1922 to 1933 he was professor of mathematics at the Technische Universität Breslau (now Wrocław University of Science and Technology).

Not allowed to work in Nazi Germany for being a Jew, he emigrated in 1934 to the Soviet Union, while his sister Emmy immigrated to the United States. Fritz was appointed to a professorship at the Tomsk State University. His son Gottfried studied mathematics in Tomsk.

In November 1937, during the Great Purge, he was arrested at his home in Tomsk by the NKVD. Albert Einstein wrote a letter on his behalf to Soviet foreign minister Maxim Litvinov, without success. On 23 October 1938, Noether was sentenced to 25 years of imprisonment on charges of espionage and sabotage. He served time in various prisons.

As was revealed much later, on 8 September 1941, less than three months after the German invasion of the Soviet Union, the Military Collegium of the USSR Supreme Court sentenced Noether to death on the accusation of "anti-Soviet propaganda". He was shot in Oryol on 11 September 1941 during the Medvedev Forest massacre. His burial place is unknown, but there is a memorial plaque in the Gengenbach Cemetery, Germany, at the site of his wife's grave.

On 22 Dec 1988, the Plenum of the USSR Supreme Court ruled that Noether had been convicted on groundless charges and voided his sentence, thus fully rehabilitating him.

== Contributions ==
In 1909, Fritz Noether studied the concept of rigid bodies in special relativity proposed by Max Born. This resulted in the Herglotz–Noether theorem.

In 1921, he introduced the operators now known as Fredholm operators and the concept of the index of such an operator, giving an example of an operator whose kernel and cokernel have different finite dimension and providing a formula for the difference of these dimensions using a complex contour integral.

In 1923, Fritz Noether presented a critique of Werner Heisenberg's dissertation. Heisenberg had analyzed the transition from laminar to turbulent flow in fluids, and Noether claimed that the applied methods were not rigorous.

== Sources ==
- Segal, Sanford L. (2003). Mathematicians under the Nazis. Princeton University Press. p. 60. ISBN 9780691164632.
