= Aurel Voss =

German mathematician (1845–1931)

- Born: 7 December 1845; Altona, Hamburg
- Died: 19 April 1931 (aged 85); Munich
- Education: University of Hannover; University of Göttingen; Heidelberg University (Deegre); University of Göttingen (PhD)
- Known for: Contracted Bianchi identities
- Scientific career
- Fields: Mathematics
- Doctoral advisor: Alfred Clebsch
- Doctoral students: Ludwig Berwald; Hugo Dingler; Fritz Noether

Aurel Voss (7 December 1845, Altona, Germany – 19 April 1931, Munich, Germany) was a German mathematician, best known today for his contributions to geometry and mechanics. He served as president of the German Mathematical Society for the 1898 term. He was a professor at the Ludwig-Maximilians-Universität München from 1902 until 1923. He became Emeritus in 1923.

In 1880, Voss published a version of the contracted Bianchi identities.

== Career ==
=== Education ===
Voss studied Mathematics and Physics at the University of Hannover, the University of Göttingen, and Heidelberg University between 1864 and 1868.

He received a PhD from the University of Göttingen the following year.

== Honors ==
He was awarded an Honorary Doctorate in Engineering Sciences by TH Munich in 1915.

== Publications ==
- Aurel, Voss (1908), Die Prinzipien der rationellen Mechanik (in German), vol. In: Encyklopädie der Mathematischen Wissenschaften
- Aurel, Voss (1899), Differential- und Integralrechnung (in German), vol. In: Encyklopädie der Mathematischen Wissenschaften
