= David Lovelock =

British theoretical physicist and mathematician (born 1938)

- Born: 1938 (age 87–88); Bromley, Kent, England
- Education: University of Natal (BSc, PhD)
- Known for: Lovelock's theorem; Lovelock theory of gravity
- Spouse: Fiona Armstrong (m. 1967)
- Children: 2
- Scientific career
- Fields: Mathematics
- Workplaces: University of Waterloo University of Arizona
- Doctoral advisor: Hanno Rund
- Doctoral students: Gregory Horndeski

David Lovelock (born 1938) is a British theoretical physicist and mathematician. He is known for the Lovelock theory of gravity and Lovelock's theorem.

== Books ==
- Lovelock, David; Rund, Hanno (1989), Tensors, Differential Forms, and Variational Principles, Dover, ISBN 978-0-486-65840-7
