= Gregory Horndeski =

American physicist and painter

Gregory Horndeski is an American painter, physicist and mathematician, known mainly for the formulation of Horndeski's theory of gravitation.

== Life and education ==
Gregory Walter Horndeski was born in Cleveland, Ohio in 1948 and got his B.A. in physics at Washington University in St. Louis in 1970 and his PhD in applied mathematics from the University of Waterloo in 1973, mainly with an interest in physics and mathematics. In 1974 he published his paper on a general second order scalar–tensor theory of gravitation, which would remain largely uncited for over 30 years before being revisited in the 2010s as an important theory in the development of modern cosmology. He became a tenured professor at the University of Waterloo in 1979, a position which he left in 1981 to focus on his painting work.

Horndeski developed his interest in art on a trip to Europe while studying physics at Washington University in St. Louis, and eventually left his work in physics to pursue a career in art as a painter, relocating to Dallas, Texas.

== Career and current work ==
Horndeski has focused on his work as a painter for the last 40 years of his career, with his paintings being exhibited at museums, galleries and art fairs. He often incorporates his interest in physics and maths in his paintings.

After the renewed interest in his theory, Horndeski has worked again in the development of scalar-tensor theory and cosmology.

== See also ==
- Outsider art
