= Scuola Superiore Meridionale =

Public graduate school in Naples, Italy

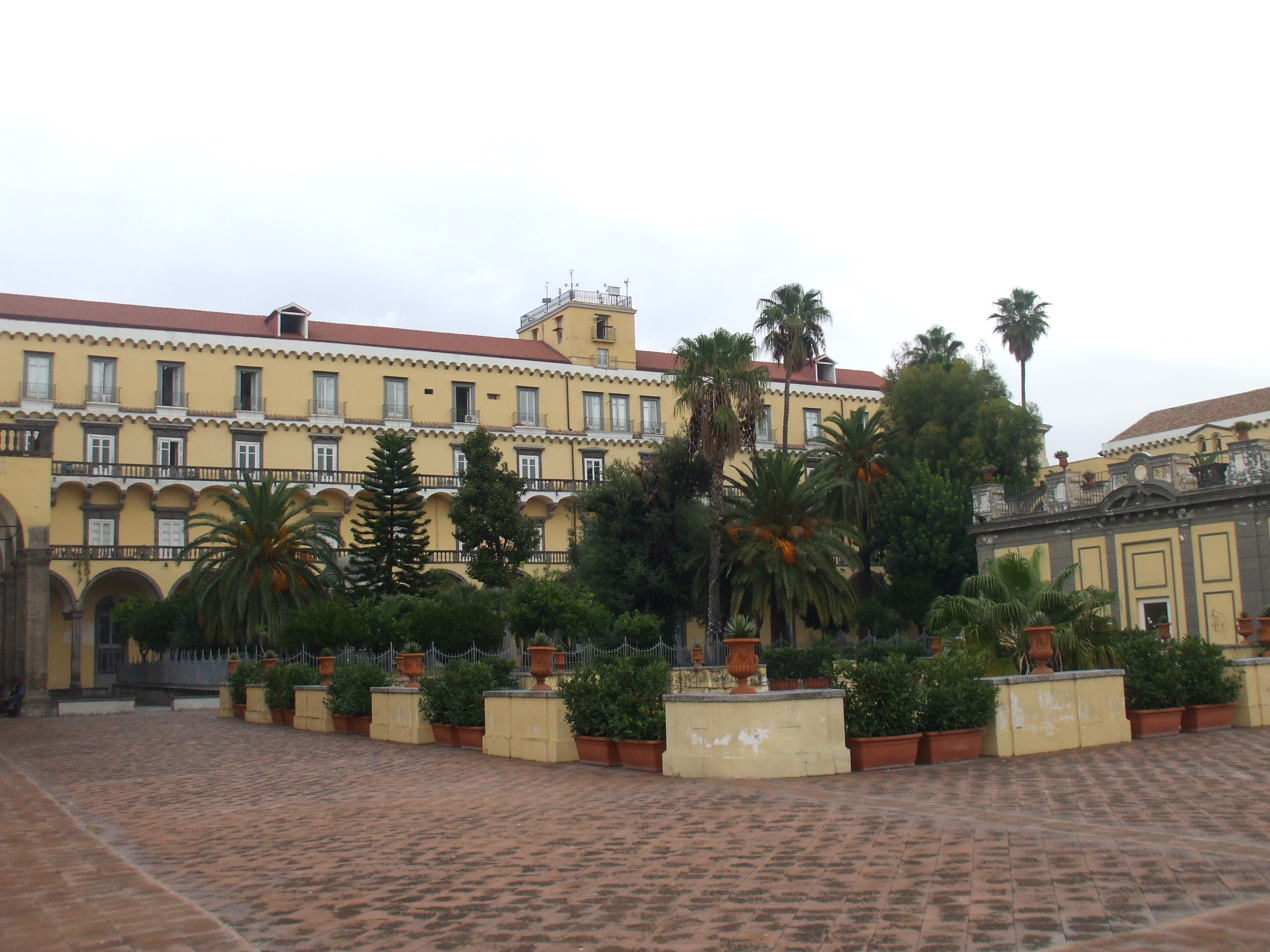
- Cloister of Saints Marcellinus and Festus, seat of the Scuola Superiore Meridionale
- Motto: Coltiva il tuo talento! (Cultivate your talent!)
- Type: Public
- Director: Arturo de Vivo
- Students: 150
- Location: Naples, Italy
- Nickname: SSM

The Scuola Superiore Meridionale (SSM) is a superior graduate school and research institution based in Naples, Italy. It was established in 2019 within the University of Naples Federico II.

== History ==
The school was established on 13 November 2019 on an experimental basis by the 2019 Italian budget law. On 2 April 2022, by decree of the Ministry of University and Research issued on 27 January 2022, the school became a fully established Superior Graduate School.

== Academic offer ==
The school offers ordinary courses to be taken alongside the standard university curriculum at the host university, as well as doctoral programmes. Its mission is to contribute to the development of the university system and to promote collaboration with other Italian and international schools and universities. It also carries out scientific research in several fields.

The Scuola Superiore Meridionale is organised into the following ten doctoral areas:

- Archaeology and cultures of the ancient Mediterranean. Historical research, conservation, and heritage management
- Clinical and Translational Oncology
- Cosmology, Space Science and Space Technology
- Genomic and Experimental Medicine
- Global History and Governance
- Law and Organizational Studies for People with Disabilities
- Mathematical and Physical Sciences for Advanced Materials and Technologies
- Modeling and Engineering Risk and Complexity
- Molecular Sciences for Earth and Space
- Texts, Traditions and Book Cultures. Italian and Romance Studies

== Facilities ==
Some teaching classrooms, the main lecture hall, administrative offices, and student services are located at Via Mezzocannone 4.

Students are housed in:

- the Marchese Campodisola residence
- the Monserrato residence
- Hotel Naples (Corso Umberto I)

The school provides students with free accommodation and meals, a monthly stipend, and exemption from university tuition fees, except for the regional tax which remains payable by the student. Admission is based on a public competitive examination held annually.

== See also ==
- University of Naples Federico II
- Doctorate
