= Lovelock theory of gravity =

In theoretical physics, Lovelock's theory of gravity (often referred to as Lovelock gravity) is a generalization of Einstein's theory of general relativity introduced by David Lovelock in 1971. It is the most general metric theory of gravity yielding conserved second order equations of motion in an arbitrary number of spacetime dimensions D. In this sense, Lovelock's theory is the natural generalization of Einstein's general relativity to higher dimensions. In three and four dimensions (D = 3, 4), Lovelock's theory coincides with Einstein's theory, but in higher dimensions the theories are different. In fact, for D > 4 Einstein gravity can be thought of as a particular case of Lovelock gravity since the Einstein–Hilbert action is one of several terms that constitute the Lovelock action.

== Lagrangian density ==
The Lagrangian of the theory is given by a sum of dimensionally extended Euler densities, and it can be written as follows

$$\mathcal{L}=\sqrt{-g}\ \sum\limits_{n=0}^{t}\alpha _{n}\ \mathcal{R}^{n},
\qquad \mathcal{R}^{n}=\frac{1}{2^{n}}\delta _{\alpha _{1}\beta_{1}...
\alpha _{n}\beta _{n}}^{\mu _{1}\nu _{1}...\mu _{n}\nu_{n}}
\prod\limits_{r=1}^{n}R_{\quad \mu _{r}\nu _{r}}^{\alpha _{r}\beta _{r}}$$

where R_{μν}^{αβ} represents the Riemann tensor, and where the generalized Kronecker delta δ is defined as the antisymmetric product

$$\delta _{\alpha _{1}\beta _{1} \cdots \alpha _{n}\beta _{n}}^{\mu _{1}\nu
_{1}...\mu _{n}\nu _{n}}=(2n)!\delta _{\lbrack \alpha _{1}}^{\mu
_{1}}\delta _{\beta _{1}}^{\nu _{1}}\cdots \delta _{\alpha _{n}}^{\mu
_{n}}\delta _{\beta _{n}]}^{\nu _{n}}.$$

Each term $\mathcal{R}^{n}$ in $\mathcal{L}$ corresponds to the dimensional extension of the Euler density in 2n dimensions, so that these only contribute to the equations of motion for n < D/2. Consequently, without lack of generality, t in the equation above can be taken to be D = 2t + 2 for even dimensions and D = 2t + 1 for odd dimensions.

== Coupling constants ==
The coupling constants α_{n} in the Lagrangian $\mathcal{L}$ have dimensions of [length]^{2n − D}, although it is usual to normalize the Lagrangian density in units of the Planck scale

$$\alpha _{1}=(16\pi G)^{-1}=l_{P}^{2-D}\,.$$

Expanding the product in $\mathcal{L}$, the Lovelock Lagrangian takes the form

$$\mathcal{L}=\sqrt{-g}\ (\alpha _{0}+\alpha _{1}R+\alpha _{2}\left(
R^{2}+R_{\alpha \beta \mu \nu }R^{\alpha \beta \mu \nu }-4R_{\mu \nu }R^{\mu
\nu }\right) +\alpha _{3}\mathcal{O}(R^{3})),$$

where one sees that coupling α_{0} corresponds to the cosmological constant Λ, while α_{n} with n ≥ 2 are coupling constants of additional terms that represent ultraviolet corrections to Einstein theory, involving higher order contractions of the Riemann tensor R_{μν}^{αβ}. In particular, the second order term

$$\mathcal{R}^{2}=R^{2}+R_{\alpha \beta \mu \nu }R^{\alpha \beta \mu \nu}-4R_{\mu \nu }R^{\mu \nu }$$

is precisely the quadratic Gauss–Bonnet term, which is the dimensionally extended version of the four-dimensional Euler density.

== Equations of motion ==
By noting that

$$T = \sqrt{-g}\mathcal R^2 = \sqrt{-g} \left(R^2 + R_{\mu\nu\rho\sigma} R^{\mu\nu\rho\sigma} - 4 R_{\mu\nu} R^{\mu\nu}\right)$$

is a topological constant, we can eliminate the Riemann tensor term and thus we can put the Lovelock Lagrangian into the form

$$S = - \int d^Dx \sqrt{-g} \left( \alpha R_{\mu\nu} R^{\mu\nu} - \beta R^2 + \gamma \kappa^{-2} R\right)$$

which has the equations of motion

$\alpha\left( - \frac{1}{2} R_{\rho\sigma} R^{\rho\sigma} g_{\mu\nu} - \nabla_\nu \nabla_\mu R - 2 R_{\rho\nu\mu\sigma} R^{\sigma\rho} + \frac{1}{2}g_{\mu\nu} \Box R + \Box R_{\mu\nu} \right) +$$\beta \left(\frac{1}{2} R^2 g_{\mu\nu} - 2 R R_{\mu\nu} + 2 \nabla_\nu \nabla_\mu R - 2 g_{\mu\nu} \Box R \right) +$$\gamma \left( - \frac{1}{2} \kappa^{-2} Rg_{\mu\nu} + \kappa^{-2} R_{\mu\nu} \right)=0.$

== Other contexts ==
Because Lovelock action contains, among others, the quadratic Gauss–Bonnet term (i.e. the four-dimensional Euler characteristic extended to D dimensions), it is usually said that Lovelock theory resembles string-theory-inspired models of gravity. This is because a quadratic term is present in the low energy effective action of heterotic string theory, and it also appears in six-dimensional Calabi–Yau compactifications of M-theory. In the mid-1980s, a decade after Lovelock proposed his generalization of the Einstein tensor, physicists began to discuss the quadratic Gauss–Bonnet term within the context of string theory, with particular attention to its property of being ghost-free in Minkowski space. The theory is known to be free of ghosts about other exact backgrounds as well, e.g. about one of the branches of the spherically symmetric solution found by Boulware and Deser in 1985. In general, Lovelock's theory represents a very interesting scenario to study how the physics of gravity is corrected at short distance due to the presence of higher order curvature terms in the action, and in the mid-2000s the theory was considered as a testing ground to investigate the effects of introducing higher-curvature terms in the context of AdS/CFT correspondence.

== See also ==
- Lovelock's theorem
- f(R) gravity
- Gauss–Bonnet gravity
- Curtright field
- Horndeski's theory
