= F(R) gravity =

Theory of gravity

In physics, f(R) is a type of modified gravity theory which generalizes Einstein's general relativity. f(R) gravity is actually a family of theories, each one defined by a different function, f, of the Ricci scalar, R. The simplest case is just the function being equal to the scalar; this is general relativity. As a consequence of introducing an arbitrary function, there may be freedom to explain the accelerated expansion and structure formation of the Universe without adding unknown forms of dark energy or dark matter. Some functional forms may be inspired by corrections arising from a quantum theory of gravity. f(R) gravity was first proposed in 1970 by Hans Adolph Buchdahl (although ϕ was used rather than f for the name of the arbitrary function). It has become an active field of research following work by Alexei Starobinsky on cosmic inflation. A wide range of phenomena can be produced from this theory by adopting different functions; however, many functional forms can now be ruled out on observational grounds, or because of pathological theoretical problems.

== Introduction ==
In f(R) gravity, one seeks to generalize the Lagrangian of the Einstein–Hilbert action:
$$S[g]= \int {1 \over 2\kappa} R \sqrt{-g} \, \mathrm{d}^4x$$
to
$$S[g]= \int {1 \over 2\kappa} f(R) \sqrt{-g} \, \mathrm{d}^4x$$
where $\kappa=\tfrac{8\pi G}{c^4}, g = \det g_{\mu\nu}$ is the determinant of the metric tensor, and f(R) is some function of the Ricci scalar.

There are two ways to track the effect of changing R to f(R), i.e., to obtain the theory field equations. The first is to use metric formalism and the second is to use the Palatini formalism. While the two formalisms lead to the same field equations for General Relativity, i.e., when f(R) = R, the field equations may differ when f(R) ≠ R.

== Metric f(R) gravity ==
=== Derivation of field equations ===
In metric f(R) gravity, one arrives at the field equations by varying the action with respect to the metric and not treating the connection $\Gamma^\mu_{\alpha\beta}$ independently. For completeness we will now briefly mention the basic steps of the variation of the action. The main steps are the same as in the case of the variation of the Einstein–Hilbert action (see the article for more details) but there are also some important differences.

The variation of the determinant is as always:
$$\delta \sqrt{-g}= -\frac{1}{2} \sqrt{-g} g_{\mu\nu} \delta g^{\mu\nu}$$

The Ricci scalar is defined as
$$R = g^{\mu\nu} R_{\mu\nu}.$$

Therefore, its variation with respect to the inverse metric $g^{\mu\nu}$ is given by
$$\begin{align}
\delta R &= R_{\mu\nu} \delta g^{\mu\nu} + g^{\mu\nu} \delta R_{\mu\nu}\\
&= R_{\mu\nu} \delta g^{\mu\nu} + g^{\mu\nu} \left (\nabla_\rho \delta \Gamma^\rho_{\nu\mu} - \nabla_\nu \delta \Gamma^\rho_{\rho\mu} \right )
\end{align}$$

For the second step see the article about the Einstein–Hilbert action. Since $\delta\Gamma^\lambda_{\mu\nu}$ is the difference of two connections, it should transform as a tensor. Therefore, it can be written as
$$\delta \Gamma^\lambda_{\mu\nu}=\frac{1}{2}g^{\lambda a}\left(\nabla_\mu\delta g_{a\nu}+\nabla_\nu\delta g_{a\mu}-\nabla_a\delta g_{\mu\nu} \right).$$

Substituting into the equation above:
$$\delta R= R_{\mu\nu} \delta g^{\mu\nu}+g_{\mu\nu}\Box \delta g^{\mu\nu}-\nabla_\mu \nabla_\nu \delta g^{\mu\nu}$$
where $\nabla_\mu$ is the covariant derivative and $\square = g^{\mu\nu}\nabla_\mu\nabla_\nu$ is the d'Alembert operator.

Denoting $F(R) = \frac{df}{d R}$, the variation in the action reads:
$$\begin{align}
\delta S[g]&= \int \frac{1}{2\kappa} \left(\delta f(R) \sqrt{-g}+f(R) \delta \sqrt{-g} \right)\, \mathrm{d}^4x \\
&= \int \frac{1}{2\kappa} \left(F(R) \delta R \sqrt{-g}-\frac{1}{2} \sqrt{-g} g_{\mu\nu} \delta g^{\mu\nu} f(R)\right) \, \mathrm{d}^4x \\
&= \int \frac{1}{2\kappa} \sqrt{-g}\left(F(R)(R_{\mu\nu} \delta g^{\mu\nu}+g_{\mu\nu}\Box \delta g^{\mu\nu}-\nabla_\mu \nabla_\nu \delta g^{\mu\nu}) -\frac{1}{2} g_{\mu\nu} \delta g^{\mu\nu} f(R) \right)\, \mathrm{d}^4x
\end{align}$$

Doing integration by parts on the second and third terms (and neglected the boundary contributions), we get:
$$\delta S[g]= \int \frac{1}{2\kappa} \sqrt{-g}\delta g^{\mu\nu} \left(F(R)R_{\mu\nu}-\frac{1}{2}g_{\mu\nu} f(R)+[g_{\mu\nu}\Box -\nabla_\mu \nabla_\nu]F(R) \right)\, \mathrm{d}^4x.$$

By demanding that the action remains invariant under variations of the metric, $\frac{\delta S}{\delta g^{\mu\nu}}=0$, one obtains the field equations:
$$F(R)R_{\mu\nu}-\frac{1}{2}g_{\mu\nu}f(R)+\left[ g_{\mu\nu} \Box-\nabla_\mu \nabla_\nu \right]F(R) = \kappa T_{\mu\nu},$$
where $T_{\mu\nu}$ is the energy–momentum tensor defined as
$$T_{\mu\nu}=-\frac{2}{\sqrt{-g}}\frac{\delta(\sqrt{-g} \mathcal L_\mathrm{m})}{\delta g^{\mu\nu}},$$
where $\mathcal L_m$ is the matter Lagrangian.

=== Generalized Friedmann equations ===
Assuming a Robertson–Walker metric with scale factor $a(t)$ we can find the generalized Friedmann equations to be (in units where $\kappa = 1$):
$$3F H^{2} = \rho_{{\rm m}}+\rho_{{\rm rad}}+\frac{1}{2}(FR-f)-3H{\dot F}$$
$$-2F\dot{H} = \rho_{{\rm m}}+\frac{4}{3}\rho_{{\rm rad}}+\ddot{F}-H\dot{F},$$
where
$$H = \frac{\dot{a}}{a}$$
is the Hubble parameter, the dot is the derivative with respect to the cosmic time t, and the terms ρ_{m} and ρ_{rad} represent the matter and radiation densities respectively; these satisfy the continuity equations:
$$\dot{\rho}_{{\rm m}}+3H\rho_{{\rm m}}=0;$$
$$\dot{\rho}_{{\rm rad}}+4H\rho_{{\rm rad}}=0.$$

=== Modified gravitational constant ===
An interesting feature of these theories is the fact that the gravitational constant is time and scale dependent. To see this, add a small scalar perturbation to the metric (in the Newtonian gauge):
$$\mathrm{d}s^2 = -(1+2\Phi)\mathrm{d}t^2 +\alpha^2 (1-2\Psi)\delta_{ij}\mathrm{d}x^i \mathrm{d}x^j$$
where Φ and Ψ are the Newtonian potentials and use the field equations to first order. After some lengthy calculations, one can define a Poisson equation in the Fourier space and attribute the extra terms that appear on the right-hand side to an effective gravitational constant G_{eff}. Doing so, we get the gravitational potential (valid on sub-horizon scales k^{2} ≫ a^{2}H^{2}):
$$\Phi = -4\pi G_\mathrm{eff} \frac{a^2}{k^2} \delta\rho_\mathrm{m}$$
where δρ_{m} is a perturbation in the matter density, k is the Fourier scale and G_{eff} is:
$$G_\mathrm{eff}=\frac{1}{8\pi F}\frac{1+4\frac{k^2}{a^2R}m}{1+3\frac{k^2}{a^2R}m},$$
with
$$m\equiv\frac{RF_{,R}}{F}.$$

=== Massive gravitational waves ===
This class of theories when linearized exhibits three polarization modes for the gravitational waves, of which two correspond to the massless graviton (helicities ±2) and the third (scalar) is coming from the fact that if we take into account a conformal transformation, the fourth order theory f(R) becomes general relativity plus a scalar field. To see this, identify
$$\Phi \to f'(R) \quad \textrm{and} \quad \frac{dV}{d\Phi}\to\frac{2f(R)-R f'(R)}{3},$$
and use the field equations above to get
$$\Box \Phi=\frac{\mathrm{d}V}{\mathrm{d}\Phi}$$

Working to first order of perturbation theory:
$$g_{\mu\nu}=\eta_{\mu\nu}+h_{\mu\nu}$$
$$\Phi=\Phi_0+\delta \Phi$$
and after some tedious algebra, one can solve for the metric perturbation, which corresponds to the gravitational waves. A particular frequency component, for a wave propagating in the z-direction, may be written as
$$h_{\mu\nu}(t,z;\omega)=A^{+}(\omega)\exp(-i\omega(t-z))e^{+}_{\mu\nu}+A^{\times}(\omega)\exp(-i\omega(t-z))e^{\times}_{\mu\nu} +h_f(v_\mathrm{g} t-z;\omega) \eta_{\mu\nu}$$
where
$$h_f\equiv \frac{\delta \Phi}{\Phi_0},$$
and v_{g}(ω) = dω/dk is the group velocity of a wave packet h_{f} centred on wave-vector k. The first two terms correspond to the usual transverse polarizations from general relativity, while the third corresponds to the new massive polarization mode of f(R) theories. This mode is a mixture of massless transverse breathing mode (but not traceless) and massive longitudinal scalar mode. The transverse and traceless modes (also known as tensor modes) propagate at the speed of light, but the massive scalar mode moves at a speed v_{G} < 1 (in units where c = 1), this mode is dispersive. However, in f(R) gravity metric formalism, for the model $f(R) = \alpha R^2$ (also known as pure $R^2$ model), the third polarization mode is a pure breathing mode and propagate with the speed of light through the spacetime.

== Equivalent formalism ==
Under certain additional conditions we can simplify the analysis of f(R) theories by introducing an auxiliary field Φ. Assuming $f''(R) \neq 0$ for all R, let V(Φ) be the Legendre transformation of f(R) so that $\Phi = f'(R)$ and $R=V'(\Phi)$. Then, one obtains the O'Hanlon (1972) action:
$$S = \int d^4x \sqrt{-g} \left[ \frac{1}{2\kappa}\left(\Phi R - V(\Phi)\right) + \mathcal{L}_{\text{m}}\right].$$

We have the Euler–Lagrange equations:
$$V'(\Phi)=R$$
$$\Phi \left( R_{\mu\nu} - \frac{1}{2}g_{\mu\nu} R \right) + \left(g_{\mu\nu}\Box -\nabla_\mu \nabla_\nu \right) \Phi + \frac{1}{2} g_{\mu\nu}V(\Phi) = \kappa T_{\mu\nu}$$

Eliminating Φ, we obtain exactly the same equations as before. However, the equations are only second order in the derivatives, instead of fourth order.

We are currently working with the Jordan frame. By performing a conformal rescaling:
$$\tilde{g}_{\mu\nu}=\Phi g_{\mu\nu},$$
we transform to the Einstein frame:
$$R = \Phi \left[ \tilde{R} + \frac{3\tilde{\Box} \Phi}{\Phi} -\frac{9}{2}\left(\frac{\tilde{\nabla} \Phi}{\Phi}\right)^2 \right]$$
$$S = \int d^4x \sqrt{-\tilde{g}}\frac{1}{2\kappa}\left[ \tilde{R} - \frac{3}{2}\left( \frac{\tilde{\nabla}\Phi}{\Phi} \right)^2 - \frac{V(\Phi)}{\Phi^2} \right]$$
after integrating by parts.

Defining $\tilde{\Phi} = \sqrt{3} \ln{\Phi}$, and substituting
$$S = \int \mathrm{d}^4x \sqrt{-\tilde{g}}\frac{1}{2\kappa}\left[ \tilde{R} - \frac{1}{2}\left(\tilde{\nabla}\tilde{\Phi}\right)^2 - \tilde{V}(\tilde{\Phi}) \right]$$
$$\tilde{V}(\tilde{\Phi}) = e^{-\frac{2}{\sqrt{3}} \tilde{\Phi}} V \left (e^{\tilde{\Phi}/\sqrt{3}} \right ).$$

This is general relativity coupled to a real scalar field: using f(R) theories to describe the accelerating universe is practically equivalent to using quintessence. (At least, equivalent up to the caveat that we have not yet specified matter couplings, so (for example) f(R) gravity in which matter is minimally coupled to the metric (i.e., in Jordan frame) is equivalent to a quintessence theory in which the scalar field mediates a fifth force with gravitational strength.)

== Palatini f(R) gravity ==
In Palatini f(R) gravity, one treats the metric and connection independently and varies the action with respect to each of them separately. The matter Lagrangian is assumed to be independent of the connection. These theories have been shown to be equivalent to Brans–Dicke theory with ω = −3/2. Due to the structure of the theory, however, Palatini f(R) theories appear to be in conflict with the Standard Model, may violate Solar system experiments, and seem to create unwanted singularities.

== Metric-affine f(R) gravity ==
In metric-affine f(R) gravity, one generalizes things even further, treating both the metric and connection independently, and assuming the matter Lagrangian depends on the connection as well.

== Observational tests ==
As there are many potential forms of f(R) gravity, it is difficult to find generic tests. Additionally, since deviations away from General Relativity can be made arbitrarily small in some cases, it is impossible to conclusively exclude some modifications. Some progress can be made, without assuming a concrete form for the function f(R) by Taylor expanding
$$f(R) = a_0 + a_1 R + a_2 R^2 + \cdots$$

The first term is like the cosmological constant and must be small. The next coefficient a_{1} can be set to one as in general relativity. For metric f(R) gravity (as opposed to Palatini or metric-affine f(R) gravity), the quadratic term is best constrained by fifth force measurements, since it leads to a Yukawa correction to the gravitational potential. The best current bounds are |a_{2}| < 4×10^{−9} m^{2} or equivalently |a_{2}| < 2.3×10^{22} GeV^{−2}.

The parameterized post-Newtonian formalism is designed to be able to constrain generic modified theories of gravity. However, f(R) gravity shares many of the same values as General Relativity, and is therefore indistinguishable using these tests. In particular light deflection is unchanged, so f(R) gravity, like General Relativity, is entirely consistent with the bounds from Cassini tracking.

== Starobinsky gravity ==
Starobinsky gravity has the following form
$$f(R) = R + \frac{R^2}{6M^2}$$
where $M$ has the dimensions of mass.

Starobinsky gravity provides a mechanism for the cosmic inflation, just after the Big Bang when R was still large. However, it is not suited to describe the present universe acceleration since at present R is very small. This implies that the quadratic term in $f(R) = R + \frac{R^2}{6M^2}$ is negligible, i.e., one tends to f(R) = R which is general relativity with a zero cosmological constant.

== Gogoi–Goswami gravity ==
Gogoi–Goswami gravity (named after Dhruba Jyoti Gogoi and Umananda Dev Goswami) has the following form
$$f(R) = R - \frac{\alpha}{\pi} R_c \cot^{-1} \left( \frac{R_c^2}{R^2} \right) - \beta R_c \left[ 1 - \exp\left( - \frac{R}{R_c} \right) \right]$$
where $\alpha$ and $\beta$ are two dimensionless positive constants and R_{c} is a characteristic curvature constant.

== Tensorial generalization ==
f(R) gravity as presented in the previous sections is a scalar modification of general relativity. More generally, we can have a
$$\int \mathrm{d}^Dx \sqrt{-g}\, f(R, R^{\mu\nu}R_{\mu\nu}, R^{\mu\nu\rho\sigma}R_{\mu\nu\rho\sigma})$$
coupling involving invariants of the Ricci tensor and the Weyl tensor. Special cases are f(R) gravity, conformal gravity, Gauss–Bonnet gravity and Lovelock gravity. Notice that with any nontrivial tensorial dependence, we typically have additional massive spin-2 degrees of freedom, in addition to the massless graviton and a massive scalar. An exception is Gauss–Bonnet gravity where the fourth order terms for the spin-2 components cancel out.

== See also ==
- Alternatives to general relativity
- Gauss–Bonnet gravity
- Lovelock gravity
- Quadratic gravity
