= Vermeil's theorem =

The scalar curvature is the only absolute invariant suitable for General Relativity

In differential geometry, Vermeil's theorem essentially states that the scalar curvature is the only (non-trivial) absolute invariant among those of prescribed type suitable for Albert Einstein’s theory of General Relativity. The theorem was proved by the German mathematician Hermann Vermeil in 1917.

== Standard version of the theorem ==
The theorem states that the Ricci scalar $R$ is the only scalar invariant (or absolute invariant) linear in the second derivatives of the metric tensor $g_{\mu\nu}$.

== See also ==
- Scalar curvature
- Differential invariant
- Einstein–Hilbert action
- Lovelock's theorem
