= Lovelock (novel) =

1994 novel by Orson Scott Card and Kathryn H. Kidd

- First edition
- Author: Orson Scott Card & Kathryn H. Kidd
- Cover artist: Donato Giancola
- Language: English
- Series: The Mayflower Trilogy
- Genre: Science fiction
- Publisher: Tor Books
- Publication date: 1994
- Publication place: United States
- Media type: Print (hardback & paperback)
- Pages: 285
- ISBN: 0-312-85732-2
- OCLC: 29792816
- Dewey Decimal: 813/.54 20
- LC Class: PS3553.A655 L68 1994
- Followed by: Rasputin

Lovelock is a 1994 science fiction novel by American writers Orson Scott Card and Kathryn H. Kidd. The novel's eponymous narrator, a sentient monkey, takes his name from James Lovelock, the scientist-inventor who formulated the Gaia hypothesis, which figures heavily in the book.

== Plot introduction ==
Lovelock is set in a near-future in which humanity is preparing to send out its first interstellar colonization ship, called the Ark. In the speculative future described by the novel, a new field of science, Gaiaology, has come into existence, based on the Gaia Hypothesis. Lovelock, a genetically- and cybernetically-enhanced capuchin monkey relates the story in the first person. Lovelock serves as the "Witness" for Carol Jeanne Cocciolone, meaning that his job is to record every waking moment of the life of a prominent member of society. As the chief Gaiaologist of the Ark, Carol Jeanne is responsible for managing the extensive terraforming their new planet will require, integrating the terrestrial species needed for the colonists' survival with the planet's existing ecology. Like every Witness, Lovelock has been indoctrinated to love and obey his owner unconditionally.

== Plot summary ==
When the book begins, the Cocciolone family is packing for their new life aboard the Mayflower. The family consists of Carol Jeanne, her husband Red, their daughters Lydia and Emmy, and Red's parents Mamie and Stef. They take a shuttle to the Ark, during which Lovelock is ashamed of his primitive, terrified response to free-fall.

Aboard the Mayflower, the Cocciolone family begins to integrate themselves into the society of the Ark. When Lovelock meets a scientist who attempts to communicate with him via sign language, Carol Jeanne explains that she hadn't taught her Witness sign language because she didn't want him "chattering to [her] all the time." This event marks Lovelock's first feelings of furious rebellion.

Lovelock begins to long for a mate, and children of his own. After learning about a supply of cryogenically frozen capuchin monkeys, he steals a young female monkey and hides her in the low-gravity poles that support the Ark. Unfortunately, she grows up stunted and sickly. Lovelock, realizing that should his actions be discovered he would be put to death, begins to write his story in a hidden file on the Ark's computer.

== Sequels ==
Card has announced that the novel is intended to be the first book in the Mayflower trilogy; the second book, Rasputin, is in progress, and the third book's title has not been announced.

== Reception ==
Publishers Weekly called the novel a "moral fable", praising Card and Kidd for their "passionate depiction of Lovelock's plight" and their "insightful portrayal of the various human characters", but emphasized that — aside from Lovelock's enhanced intelligence — the novel's science fictional elements are "drown(ed) out".

Kirkus Reviews described the novel as "(s)o-so at best", and "bloated and flabby", criticizing it for lacking "even a token ending".

Other reviews:

- Review by Gary K. Wolfe (1994) in Locus, #405 October 1994
- Review by Fred Patten (1995) in Yarf! The Journal of Applied Anthropomorphics #36
- Review by Piotr Gociek (1997) in Talizman #2-3 1997, p. 110 (in Polish)

== See also ==
- List of works by Orson Scott Card
- Orson Scott Card
