= Einstein tensor =

Tensor used in general relativity

In differential geometry, the Einstein tensor (named after Albert Einstein; also known as the trace-reversed Ricci tensor) is used to express the curvature of a pseudo-Riemannian manifold. In general relativity, it occurs in the Einstein field equations for gravitation that describe spacetime curvature in a manner that is consistent with conservation of energy and momentum.

== Definition ==
The Einstein tensor $\boldsymbol{G}$ is a tensor of order 2 defined over pseudo-Riemannian manifolds. In index-free notation it is defined as
$$\boldsymbol{G}=\boldsymbol{R}-\frac{1}{2}\boldsymbol{g}R,$$
where $\boldsymbol{R}$ is the Ricci tensor, $\boldsymbol{g}$ is the metric tensor and $R$ is the scalar curvature, which is computed as the trace of the Ricci tensor $R_{\mu \nu}$ by $R = g^{\mu \nu}R_{\mu \nu }$. In component form, the previous equation reads as
$$G_{\mu\nu} = R_{\mu\nu} - {1\over2} g_{\mu\nu}R .$$

The Einstein tensor is symmetric
$$G_{\mu\nu} = G_{\nu\mu}$$
and, like the on-shell stress–energy tensor, has zero divergence:
$$\nabla_\mu G^{\mu\nu} = 0\,.$$

== Explicit form ==
The Ricci tensor depends only on the metric tensor, so the Einstein tensor can be defined directly with just the metric tensor. However, this expression is complex and rarely quoted in textbooks. The complexity of this expression can be shown using the formula for the Ricci tensor in terms of Christoffel symbols:
$$\begin{align}
G_{\alpha\beta}
&= R_{\alpha\beta} - \frac{1}{2} g_{\alpha\beta} R \\
&= R_{\alpha\beta} - \frac{1}{2} g_{\alpha\beta} g^{\gamma\zeta} R_{\gamma\zeta} \\
&= \left(\delta^\gamma_\alpha \delta^\zeta_\beta - \frac{1}{2} g_{\alpha\beta}g^{\gamma\zeta}\right) R_{\gamma\zeta} \\
&= \left(\delta^\gamma_\alpha \delta^\zeta_\beta - \frac{1}{2} g_{\alpha\beta}g^{\gamma\zeta}\right)\left(\Gamma^\epsilon{}_{\gamma\zeta,\epsilon} - \Gamma^\epsilon{}_{\gamma\epsilon,\zeta} + \Gamma^\epsilon{}_{\epsilon\sigma} \Gamma^\sigma{}_{\gamma\zeta} - \Gamma^\epsilon{}_{\zeta\sigma} \Gamma^\sigma{}_{\epsilon\gamma}\right), \\[2pt]
G^{\alpha\beta}
&= \left(g^{\alpha\gamma} g^{\beta\zeta} - \frac{1}{2} g^{\alpha\beta}g^{\gamma\zeta}\right)\left(\Gamma^\epsilon{}_{\gamma\zeta,\epsilon} - \Gamma^\epsilon{}_{\gamma\epsilon,\zeta} + \Gamma^\epsilon{}_{\epsilon\sigma} \Gamma^\sigma{}_{\gamma\zeta} - \Gamma^\epsilon{}_{\zeta\sigma} \Gamma^\sigma{}_{\epsilon\gamma}\right),
\end{align}$$
where $\delta^\alpha_\beta$ is the Kronecker tensor and the Christoffel symbol $\Gamma^\alpha{}_{\beta\gamma}$ is defined as
$$\Gamma^\alpha{}_{\beta\gamma} = \frac{1}{2} g^{\alpha\epsilon}\left(g_{\beta\epsilon,\gamma} + g_{\gamma\epsilon,\beta} - g_{\beta\gamma,\epsilon}\right).$$
and terms of the form $\Gamma ^\alpha _{\beta \gamma, \mu}$ or $g_{\beta\gamma,\mu}$ represent partial derivatives in the μ-direction, e.g.:
$$\Gamma^\alpha{}_{\beta\gamma, \mu} = \partial _\mu \Gamma^\alpha{}_{\beta\gamma} =
\frac{\partial}{\partial x^\mu}
\Gamma^\alpha{}_{\beta\gamma}$$

Before cancellations, this formula results in $2 \times (6 + 6 + 9 + 9) = 60$ individual terms. Cancellations bring this number down somewhat.

In the special case of a locally inertial reference frame near a point, the first derivatives of the metric tensor vanish and the component form of the Einstein tensor is considerably simplified:
$$\begin{align}
G_{\alpha\beta}
& = g^{\gamma\mu}\left[ g_{\gamma[\beta,\mu]\alpha} + g_{\alpha[\mu,\beta]\gamma} - \frac{1}{2} g_{\alpha\beta} g^{\epsilon\sigma} \left(g_{\epsilon[\mu,\sigma]\gamma} + g_{\gamma[\sigma,\mu]\epsilon}\right)\right] \\
& = g^{\gamma\mu} \left(\delta^\epsilon_\alpha \delta^\sigma_\beta - \frac{1}{2} g^{\epsilon\sigma}g_{\alpha\beta}\right)\left(g_{\epsilon[\mu,\sigma]\gamma} + g_{\gamma[\sigma,\mu]\epsilon}\right),
\end{align}$$
where square brackets conventionally denote antisymmetrization over bracketed indices, i.e.
$$g_{\alpha[\beta,\gamma]\epsilon} \, = \frac{1}{2} \left(g_{\alpha\beta,\gamma\epsilon} - g_{\alpha\gamma,\beta\epsilon}\right).$$

== Trace ==
The trace of the Einstein tensor can be computed by contracting the equation in the definition with the metric tensor $g^{\mu\nu}$. In $n$ dimensions (of arbitrary signature):
$$\begin{align}
g^{\mu\nu}G_{\mu\nu} &= g^{\mu\nu}R_{\mu\nu} - {1\over2} g^{\mu\nu}g_{\mu\nu}R \\
G &= R - {1\over2} (nR) = {{2-n}\over2}R
\end{align}$$

Therefore, in the special case of $n = 4$ dimensions, $G = -R$. That is, the trace of the Einstein tensor is the negative of the Ricci tensor's trace. Thus, another name for the Einstein tensor is the trace-reversed Ricci tensor. This $n=4$ case is especially relevant in the theory of general relativity.

== Use in general relativity ==
The Einstein tensor allows the Einstein field equations to be written in the concise form:
$$G_{\mu\nu} + \Lambda g_{\mu \nu} = \kappa T_{\mu\nu} ,$$
where $\Lambda$ is the cosmological constant and $\kappa$ is the Einstein gravitational constant.

From the explicit form of the Einstein tensor, the Einstein tensor is a nonlinear function of the metric tensor, but is linear in the second partial derivatives of the metric. As a symmetric order-2 tensor, the Einstein tensor has 10 independent components in a 4-dimensional space. It follows that the Einstein field equations are a set of 10 quasilinear second-order partial differential equations for the metric tensor.

The contracted Bianchi identities can also be easily expressed with the aid of the Einstein tensor:
$$\nabla_{\mu} G^{\mu\nu} = 0.$$

The (contracted) Bianchi identities automatically ensure the covariant conservation of the stress–energy tensor in curved spacetimes:
$$\nabla_{\mu} T^{\mu\nu} = 0.$$

The physical significance of the Einstein tensor is highlighted by this identity. In terms of the densitized stress tensor contracted on a Killing vector $\xi^\mu$, an ordinary conservation law holds:
$$\partial_{\mu}\left(\sqrt{-g}\ T^\mu{}_\nu \xi^\nu\right) = 0.$$

== Uniqueness ==
David Lovelock has shown that, in a four-dimensional differentiable manifold, the Einstein tensor is the only tensorial and divergence-free function of the $g_{\mu\nu}$ and at most their first and second partial derivatives.

However, the Einstein field equation is not the only equation which satisfies the three conditions:

1. Resemble but generalize Newton–Poisson gravitational equation
2. Apply to all coordinate systems, and
3. Guarantee local covariant conservation of energy–momentum for any metric tensor.

Many alternative theories have been proposed, such as the Einstein–Cartan theory, that also satisfy the above conditions.

== See also ==
- Contracted Bianchi identities
- Vermeil's theorem
- Mathematics of general relativity
- General relativity resources
