= CAP =

CAP may refer to:

== Certifications ==
- Certified Administrative Professional, a IAAP certification
- Certified Authorization Professional, a (ISC)² certification
- Certified Automation Professional, a ISA certification

== Companies ==
- Centre d'Analyse et de Programmation, a French software company, now part of Capgemini
- CAP Group (Computer Analysts and Programmers), a UK software company
- CAP S.A. (Compañía de Acero del Pacífico), a Chilean mining and steel sector holding company
- CAP Scientific, a British defence software company (1979-1988)
- Christchurch Adventure Park, a mountain bike park opened in Christchurch, New Zealand, in 2016
- Companhia Aeronáutica Paulista, a 1940s Brazilian aircraft manufacturer
- Constructions Aéronautiques Parisiennes, Apex Aircraft training and aerobatic aircraft

== Computing ==
- CAP computer, an experimental machine built in Cambridge, UK
- CAP theorem, Consistency, Availability, Partition-tolerance theorem in computer science
- Camel Application Part, a protocol used in CAMEL servers
- Common Alerting Protocol, an XML based data format for exchanging public warnings between different alerting technologies

== Military ==
- Combat air patrol
- Combined Action Program (AKA Combined Action Platoon), a United States Marine Corps Vietnam era special operation
- Civil Air Patrol, the official US Air Force Auxiliary

== Organizations ==
- Citizens' Action Party (disambiguation)
- Canadian Action Party, a former Canadian political party
- Canadian Association of Physicists, a professional society
- CAP Northwest (formerly Cascade AIDS Project), an HIV/AIDS support and advocacy organisation in Portland, Oregon, U.S.
- Center for American Progress, a left-of-centre think tank
- Central Arizona Project, a diversion canal in Arizona, U.S.
- Central Atlanta Progress, a not-for-profit business stimulus group in Atlanta, U.S.
- Chicago Area Project, a juvenile delinquency project
- Christian Appalachian Project, a program to assist disadvantaged persons in Kentucky and West Virginia
- Christians Against Poverty, the UK charity
- Church Action on Poverty, UK national ecumenical social justice charity established in 1982
- College of American Pathologists, an American professional association
- Committee of Advertising Practice, the British advertising regulatory body
- Committee for Another Policy (Comité voor een Andere Politiek / Comité pour une Autre Politique), a Belgian political movement
- Companions and Pets Party, an Australian political party
- Concerned Alumni of Princeton, a former politically conservative student group at Princeton university
- Concerned Artists of the Philippines, a cultural organization
- Congress of Aboriginal Peoples, Canadian aboriginal organization

== Projects, programs, policies ==
- Canada Assistance Plan, a former transfer program administrated by the government of Canada
- Capital Assistance Program
- Child access prevention laws, which punish adults who allow children to access guns
- Common Agricultural Policy, the European Union's agricultural subsidy system
- Community Access Program, a government of Canada initiative to provide access to the Internet in remote areas
- Community Action Program, Lyndon Johnson's anti-poverty programs
- Community Action Programme, United Kingdom workfare scheme
- Copyright Agency Partnerships, an Australian art commissioning project
- German Climate Action Plan 2050, a climate protection policy document approved in late-2016

== Science and medicine ==
- CaP, prostate cancer
- CAP (protein), cyclase-associated protein
- Carrierless amplitude phase modulation
- Catabolite activator protein, a regulatory protein for mRNA transcription in prokaryotes that binds cyclic AMP
- Cellulose acetate phthalate, a cellulose-based polymer
- Central aortic pressure, the blood pressure at the root of the aorta
- Community-acquired pneumonia, a common but potentially-dangerous infectious disease of the lower respiratory tract
- Cumulative accuracy profile is used in data science to visualize the discriminative power of a model
- Compound action potential, an evoked potential

== Other ==
- Carlos Andrés Pérez (1922-2010), twice President of Venezuela
- CAP Markets, social franchise and supermarket chain in Germany
- Capital Airlines, the ICAO airline designator for this airline
- Causal adequacy principle, a philosophical claim made by René Descartes
- Central Arizona Project, the Colorado River diversion canal in Arizona
- Chip Authentication Program, using EMV smartcards to authenticate online banking transactions
- Coded Anti-Piracy, an anti-piracy system for motion picture prints exhibited theatrically
- Comprehensive Assessment Program for Junior High School Students, an exam for junior high school students in the Republic of China (Taiwan)
- Confederation of African Pickleball, continental sports federation
- Consolidated Appeals Process, a funding mechanism used by humanitarian aid organisations
- Codice di Avviamento Postale, literally Postal Expedition Code, Italy's postal code system
- Estadio CAP (Compañía de Acero del Pacífico), a football stadium in Talcahuano, Chile

== See also ==
- CAP code (disambiguation)
- Capp (disambiguation)
- CAPPE (disambiguation)
