= Cap (disambiguation) =

A cap is a form of headgear.

Cap may refer to:

== Arts and entertainment ==
- Cap, a character in the comic strip Cap Stubbs and Tippie
- The Cap, a 1984 Canadian short film
- "Cap" (song), a song by KSI featuring Offset from the 2020 album Dissimulation

== Health and medicine ==
- Cervical cap, a barrier method of contraception
- Crown (dentistry), a type of dental restoration

== People ==
- Cap (nickname), a list of people
- Čáp, a list of people with the Czech surname
- Vladislao Cap (1934–1982), Argentine footballer
- Cap R. Carden (1866–1935), American politician

== Places ==
- Cap Point, Saint Lucia
- Cap River, New Caledonia
- El Capitan, or "El Cap", a rock formation in Yosemite National Park
- Nga Ying Chau or Cap Island, a former island in Hong Kong

== Science and technology ==
- Cap set and cap, in affine geometry
- CAP theorem, related to properties of distributed data stores
- Capricornus, an astronomical constellation, whose stars are abbreviated β Cap, δ Cap, etc.
- Five-prime cap, a special nucleotide added to the 5′ end of some eukaryotic mRNA molecules
- Pileus (mycology), the cap of a mushroom or related fungi
- Cap, a piping and plumbing fitting
- Cap, another name for a lid, a container part that serves as the closure, cover, or seal
- Armor-piercing cap (often known simply as a 'cap'), a metal cover on an armor-piercing projectile meant to protect the penetrator and improve armor-penetrating capabilities.
- Capacitor, an electronic device, sometimes referred to by the abbreviated name "cap"

== Sports ==
- Cap (sport), a term for an athlete's appearance at international level
- Salary cap, an agreement limiting money spent on players' salaries
- Québec Capitales, a Canadian professional baseball team based in Quebec City, nicknamed "The Caps"

== Other uses ==
- Cap (crown), the cap which fills the inner space of modern crowns
- Cap, a winemaking term
- Cap, or Camper shell, a covering for the rear bed of a pickup truck
- Captain, a title, rank or, position, sometimes abbreviated as "Cap" or "Cap."
- Cap Radio (Morocco), a Moroccan radio station
- Chipaya language, ISO 639-3 language code 'cap'
- Combat air patrol, a type of flying mission for military aircraft
- Closure (container), often referred to as a cap
- Percussion cap, ignition device
- Cap, short for Capitulum

== See also ==
- CAP (disambiguation)
- Caps (disambiguation)
- Capp (disambiguation)
- CAPPE (disambiguation)
- Market capitalization (market cap), the market value of a publicly traded company's outstanding shares
- Interest rate cap, a type of interest rate derivative
- Blasting cap, an explosive detonator
- Percussion cap, a single-use ignition device on muzzleloader firearms
