= Capp =

Capp or CAPP may refer to:

== In science and technology ==
- Computer-aided Process Planning, activities and functions to prepare plans and instructions to manufacture a part or product
- Computer-aided Production Planning, variant of Computer-aided Process Planning
- Controlled Access Protection Profile, a set of functional and assurance security requirements for information technology products
- Content Addressable Parallel Processor, type of parallel processor which uses content-addressing memory (CAM) principles
- Ceramide-activated protein phosphatase, a group of enzymes involved in second-messaging systems

== Other uses ==
- Capp (surname)
- Andy Capp, British comic strip and fictional character
- Californians Allied for Patient Protection, coalition to protect the Medical Injury Compensation Reform Act of 1975 (MICRA)
- Canadian Association of Petroleum Producers, voice of the upstream Canadian oil and natural gas industry
- Canadians Against Proroguing Parliament
- Canadians Advocating Political Participation
- Centesimus Annus Pro Pontifice, a foundation established in 1993
- Central African Power Pool

== See also ==
- Capps (disambiguation)
- CAPPE (disambiguation)
- CAP (disambiguation)
- Cap (disambiguation)
