= Capps =

Capps may refer to:

== Places ==
=== United States ===
- Mount Capps, Alaska
- Capps, Arkansas, an unincorporated community
- Capps, Florida, a small town
- Capps, Missouri, an unincorporated community

== Other uses ==
- USS Capps (DD-550), a U.S. Navy destroyer
- Capps (surname), people with the surname Capps
- Computer-Assisted Passenger Prescreening System, a U.S. airport security program

== See also ==
- Capp (disambiguation)
- Caps (disambiguation)
