= Caps =

Caps are flat headgear.

Caps or CAPS may also refer to:

== Science and technology ==
=== Computing ===
- CESG Assisted Products Service, provided by the U.K. Government Communications Headquarters
- Composite Application Platform Suite, by Java Caps, a Java framework
- Computer Animation Production System, a film animation post-production system developed by Walt Disney Feature Animation and Pixar

=== Biology, medicine and psychology ===
==== Genetics ====
- Calcyphosin, the CAPS gene and its protein
- Cleaved amplified polymorphic sequence, markers used to detect a polymorphic sequence

==== Medical conditions ====
- Auditory processing disorder (APD), formerly Central Auditory Processing Syndrome
- Catastrophic antiphospholipid syndrome
- Cryopyrin-associated periodic syndrome, a spectrum of autoinflammatory syndrome

==== Other uses in biology, medicine and psychology ====
- CAPS (buffer), N-cyclohexyl-3-aminopropanesulfonic acid, in biochemistry, a buffering agent
- Cognitive-affective personality system, a model within psychology of personality

=== Other uses in science and technology ===
- Cassini Plasma Spectrometer, a direct sensing instrument that measures the energy and electrical charge of particles
- Cirrus Airframe Parachute System, a whole-aircraft emergency parachute system developed by Ballistic Recovery Systems and Cirrus
- Collective Awareness Platforms for Sustainability and Social Innovation, a program of the European Commission

== Companies and organizations ==
- Californians for Population Stabilization
- Captive Animals Protection Society
- Center for Advanced Public Safety at the University of Alabama
- Center for American Political Studies at Harvard University
- Center for Analysis and Prediction of Storms
- Citizen Action Party – Sikkim
- Comic Art Professional Society
- Policy Planning Staff (France), Centre d'Analyse, de Prévision et de Stratégie

== Sports ==
- Caps (gamer), Danish esports player
- Cap (sport), a measure of a player's international appearances, especially in football
- Washington Capitals, an American ice hockey team

== Other uses ==
- Caps (party), an 18th-century Swedish political faction
- All caps, formatting text to only use capital/uppercase letters
- Caps, Texas, Taylor County, Texas, U.S.
- Chicago Alternative Policing Strategy, a government program in Illinois, U.S.

== See also ==
- Cap (disambiguation)
- Capps (disambiguation)
- St. John's IceCaps, an AHL team
- Raleigh IceCaps, an ECHL team
