= Acquaviva =

Acquaviva may refer to:

== Places ==
=== Italy ===
- Acquaviva, Montepulciano, in the province of Siena
- Acquaviva Collecroce, in the province of Campobasso
- Acquaviva delle Fonti, in the province of Bari
- Acquaviva d'Isernia, in the province of Isernia
- Acquaviva Picena, in the province of Ascoli Piceno
- Acquaviva Platani, in the province of Caltanissetta

=== San Marino ===
- Acquaviva (San Marino), a Sammarinese castello

== People ==
- House of Acquaviva, an Italian noble family, descendants of Giulio Antonio Acquaviva
- Andrea Matteo Acquaviva (1456–1528), Duca d'Atri, Italian writer
- Belisario Acquaviva (c. 1460–1528), his younger brother
- Claudio Acquaviva (1543–1615), fifth general of the Society of Jesus
- Giulio Antonio Acquaviva (c. 1420–1481), Italian nobleman and condottiere
- Jean-Félix Acquaviva (born 1973), French politician
- John Acquaviva (born 1963), Canadian DJ
- Nick Acquaviva (1927–2003), American composer and band leader
- Rodolfo Acquaviva (1550–1583), Jesuit missionary and martyr in India
- Tony Acquaviva (1925–1986), American composer and conductor
- Viviana Acquaviva (born 1979), Italian astrophysicist

== See also ==
- Aquaviva (disambiguation)
