= Cap Radio =

Cap Radio may refer to:

- Cap Radio (Morocco), a Morocco radio station.
- Capital Public Radio, an American organization comprising 7 radio stations.
