= CAPPE =

CAPPE or variation, may refer to:

- Centre for Applied Philosophy, Politics and Ethics at the University of Brighton
- Centre for Applied Philosophy and Public Ethics at Charles Sturt University (now defunct)
- Cappe, surname

== See also ==
- Capp (disambiguation)
- Cape (disambiguation)
- Cap (disambiguation)
- CAP (disambiguation)
