= Thomas Siepmann =

German computer scientist and professor

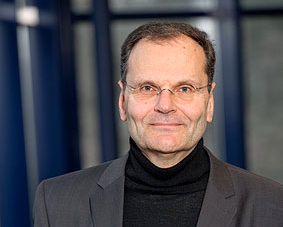
- Thomas Siepmann in 2024
- Born: April 23, 1958 (age 68); Essen, West Germany
- Education: Ruhr University Bochum
- Known for: Application lifecycle management
- Scientific career
- Fields: Computer science, Cybernetics
- Workplaces: FH Aachen University of Applied Sciences

Thomas Siepmann (born April 23, 1958) is a German computer scientist and professor at FH Aachen University of Applied Sciences.

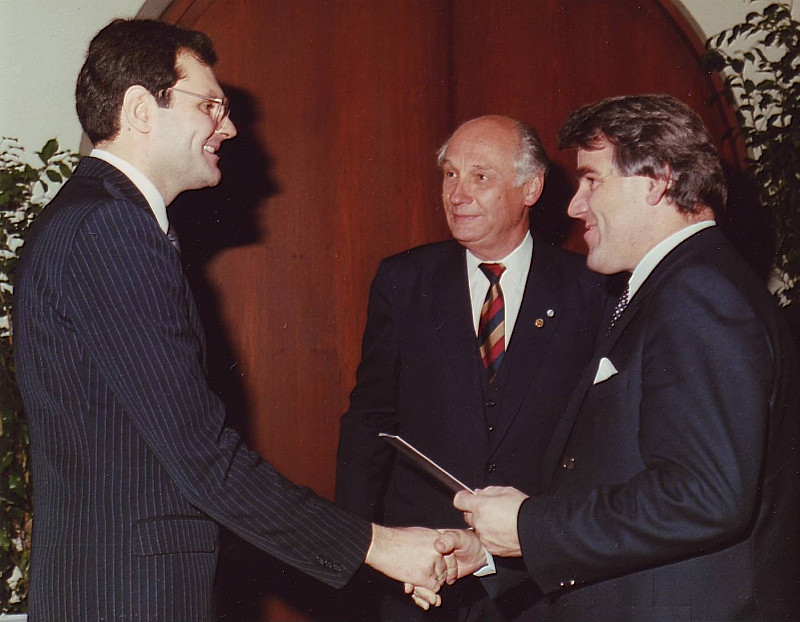
Thomas Siepmann receives the FAG-Kugelfischer Foundation Award from State Secretary Alfons Zeller and Georg Schäfer, Chairman of the Foundation Board

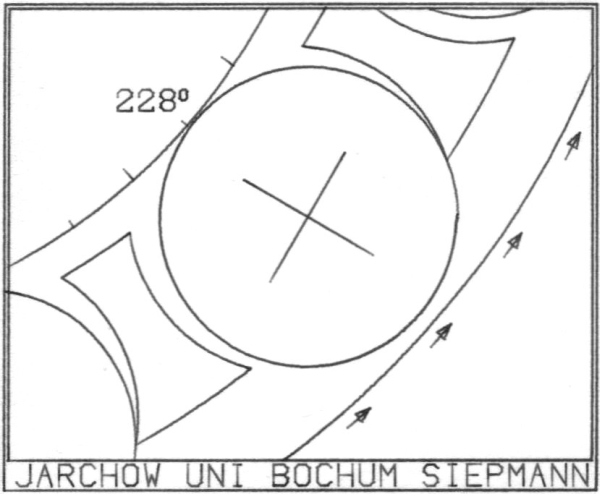
Computer animation (1987) of the lubrication film conditions in a generally accelerated rolling bearing

== Achievements ==
Thomas Siepmann studied mechanical engineering at Ruhr-Universität Bochum and received his PhD (Dr.-Ing.) from the Institute of Design Engineering as a research assistant to Friedrich Jarchow. In 1988, he was awarded the FAG Kugelfischer Prize for his dissertation on “Friction Moments in Cylindrical Roller Bearings for Planetary Gears” . His research describes the friction conditions of rolling bearings subjected to arbitrary accelerations based on the theory of transient elastohydrodynamic lubrication, thereby enabling their numerical analysis.

== Industrial activity ==
After obtaining his PhD, he worked in software development, management consulting, and IT services. In 1987, he began working at the Krupp Research Institute in Essen within the Artificial Intelligence and Expert Systems research team. Between 1994 and 2003, he headed standard software development at a software company, was managing director of an IT consulting firm and managed the service management department of a large IT service provider.

== Research in artificial intelligence ==
From 1987 to 1994, Siepmann worked at the Krupp Research Institute (KFI) in Essen, where he was a member and later head of a specialized research group for artificial intelligence (AI) and expert systems. During this phase, the Krupp Group pursued an extensive AI strategy that defined computer-based knowledge processing as a key strategic factor for industrial competitiveness. The Group's Executive Board allocated substantial budgets for this purpose, with significant resources allocated to personnel and AI research. The research group's spectrum of work covered the central sub-disciplines of artificial intelligence: natural language processing, image and pattern recognition, expert systems, and robotics. In this environment, Siepmann was involved in the development of expert systems for industrial practice, including automated production planning and NC code generation in machining technology. The technological implementation was based on modern AI methods such as symbolic knowledge representation, inference mechanisms (deduction), and heuristic search methods. Specialized programming languages such as Lisp and Prolog were used, as well as hybrid system architectures that linked declarative factual knowledge in frames with procedural knowledge in production rules. Another research focus was the integration of learning capabilities into software systems. Early concepts of machine learning and the simulation of biological-organic problem-solving processes using parallel computers and neural networks were pursued in order to move beyond the mere reproduction of expert knowledge to autonomous knowledge adaptation. The goal was the deep integration of these systems into CIM concepts, for example to automate fault diagnosis on diesel engines or the configuration of plastic blow molding machines.

== Research and teaching ==
Since 2003, he has been a professor at FH Aachen University of Applied Sciences. His teaching and research focus on application lifecycle management, specifically within IT environments. His research primarily examines software development teams as cybernetic systems
