= Production planning =

Step in the production cycle

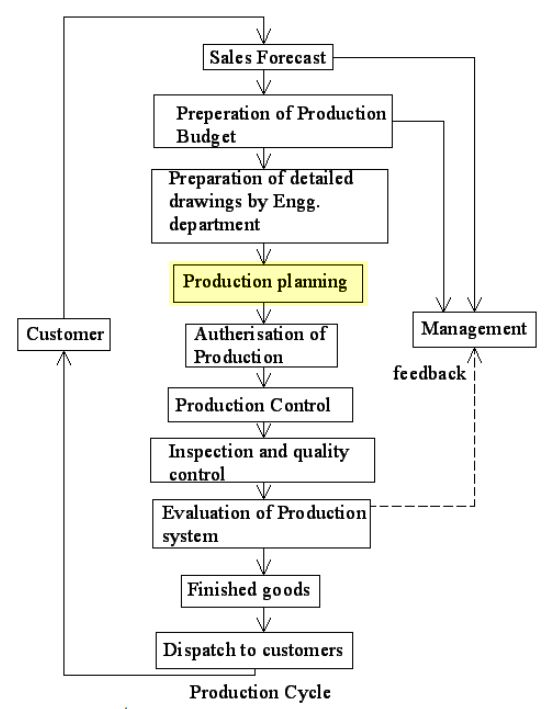
Role of Production Planning in the Production Cycle.

Production planning is the planning of production and manufacturing modules in a company or industry. It uses the resource allocation of activities of employees, materials and production capacity, in order to serve different customers.

Different types of production methods, such as single item manufacturing, batch production, mass production, continuous production etc. have their own type of production planning. Production planning can be combined with production control into production planning and control, or it can be combined with enterprise resource planning.

== Overview ==
Production planning is the future of production. It can help in efficient manufacturing or setting up of a production site by facilitating required needs. A production plan is made periodically for a specific time period, called the planning horizon. It can comprise the following activities:

- Determination of the required product mix and factory load to satisfy customers needs.
- Matching the required level of production to the existing resources.
- Scheduling and choosing the actual work to be started in the manufacturing facility
- Setting up and delivering production orders to production facilities.

In order to develop production plans, the production planner or production planning department needs to work closely together with the marketing department and sales department. They can provide sales forecasts, or a listing of customer orders. The work is usually selected from a variety of product types which may require different resources and serve different customers. Therefore, the selection must optimize customer-independent performance measures such as cycle time and customer-dependent performance measures such as on-time delivery.

A critical factor in production planning is the accurate estimation of the productive capacity of available resources, yet this is one of the most difficult tasks to perform well. Production planning should always take into account material availability, resource availability and knowledge of future demand.

== History ==
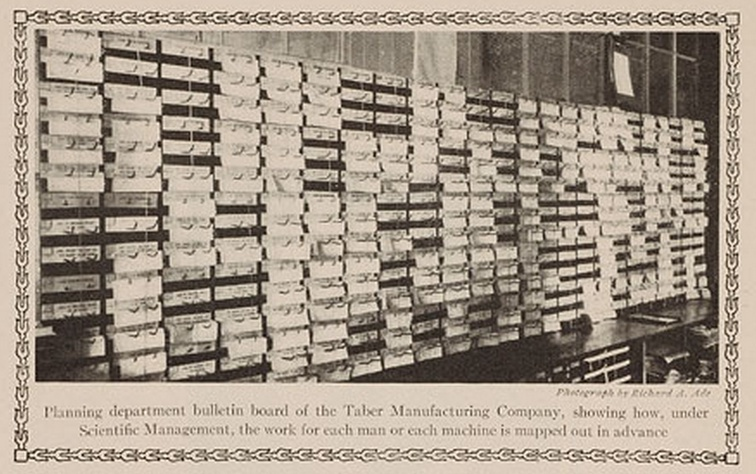
Planning department bulletin board, 1911.

Modern production planning methods and tools have been developed since late 19th century. Under Scientific Management, the work for each man or each machine is mapped out in advance. The origin of production planning back goes another century. Robert S. Kaplan summarized that "the demand for information for internal planning and control apparently arose in the first half of the 19th century when firms, such as textile mills and railroads, had to devise internal administrative procedures to coordinate the multiple processes involved in the performance of the basic activity (the conversion of raw materials into finished goods by textile mills, the transportation of passengers and freight by the railroads)."

Jeffrey W. Herrmann further describes the circumstances in which new methods for internal planning and control evolved: "The first factories were quite simple and relatively small. They produced a small number of products in large batches. Productivity gains came from using interchangeable parts to eliminate time-consuming fitting operations. Through the late 1800s, manufacturing firms were concerned with maximizing the productivity of the expensive equipment in the factory. Keeping utilization high was an important objective. Foremen ruled their shops, coordinating all of the activities needed for the limited number of products for which they were responsible. They hired operators, purchased materials, managed production, and delivered the product. They were experts with superior technical skills, and they (not a separate staff of clerks) planned production. Even as factories grew, they were just bigger, not more complex."

About production planning, Herrmann recounts that "production scheduling started simply also. Schedules, when used at all, listed only when work on an order should begin or when the order is due. They didn't provide any information about how long the total order should take or about the time required for individual operations ..."

In 1923, Industrial Management cited a Mr. Owens who had observed: "Production planning is rapidly becoming one of the most vital necessities of management. It is true that every establishment, no matter how large or how small has production planning in some form; but a large percentage of these do not have planning that makes for an even flow of material, and a minimum amount of money tied up in inventories."

== Topics ==
=== Types of planning ===
Different types of production planning can be applied:

- Advanced planning and scheduling
- Capacity planning
- Master production schedule
- Material requirements planning
- MRP II (Manufacturing Resources Planning)
- Scheduling
- Workflow

Related kind of planning in organizations

- Employee scheduling
- Enterprise resource planning
- Inventory control
- Product planning
- Project planning
- Process planning, redirects to Computer-aided process planning
- Sales and operations planning
- Strategy

=== Production control ===
Production control is the activity of controlling the workflow in the production. It is partly complementary to production planning.

== See also ==
- Industrial engineering
- Manufacturing process management
- Materials management
- Operations management
- Production engineering
