= Capps (surname) =

Capps is a surname, and may refer to:

- Charles Capps (1934–2014), American Christian preacher
- Charlie Capps (politician) (1925–2009), American politician
- Edward Capps Sr. (1866–1950), American professor, Colonel, and diplomat
- Edwin M. Capps (1860–1938), American politician
- Hahn William Capps (1903–1998), American entomologist
- J. Russell Capps (1931–2020), American politician
- Jimmy Capps (1939–2020), American country guitarist
- Lois Capps (born 1938), American politician
- Marian Palmer Capps (1901–2001), American mathematician
- Matt Capps (born 1983), American baseball player
- Steve Capps, American programmer
- Walter Capps (1934–1997), American politician
- Washington L. Capps (1864–1935), American naval officer

== See also ==
- Capp (disambiguation)
