= University of Pisa =

Public research university in Pisa, Italy

Coordinates: 43°42′59.43″N 10°23′54.45″E

- Università di Pisa
- Seal of the university
- Motto: In supremæ dignitatis
- Motto in English: In supreme dignity
- Type: Public
- Established: 1343; 683 years ago
- Affiliations: ICoN, EUA, URA, PEGASUS
- Rector: Riccardo Zucchi
- Administrative staff: 3051
- Students: 49,618
- Doctoral students: 3,500
- Location: Pisa, Italy
- Campus: Urban/University town
- Sports teams: CUS Pisa
- Website: unipi.it

The University of Pisa (Italian: Università di Pisa, UniPi) is a public research university in Pisa, Italy. Founded in 1343, it is one of the oldest universities in Europe. Together with Scuola Normale Superiore di Pisa and Sant'Anna School of Advanced Studies, it is part of the Pisa University System.

== History ==
=== The Origins ===
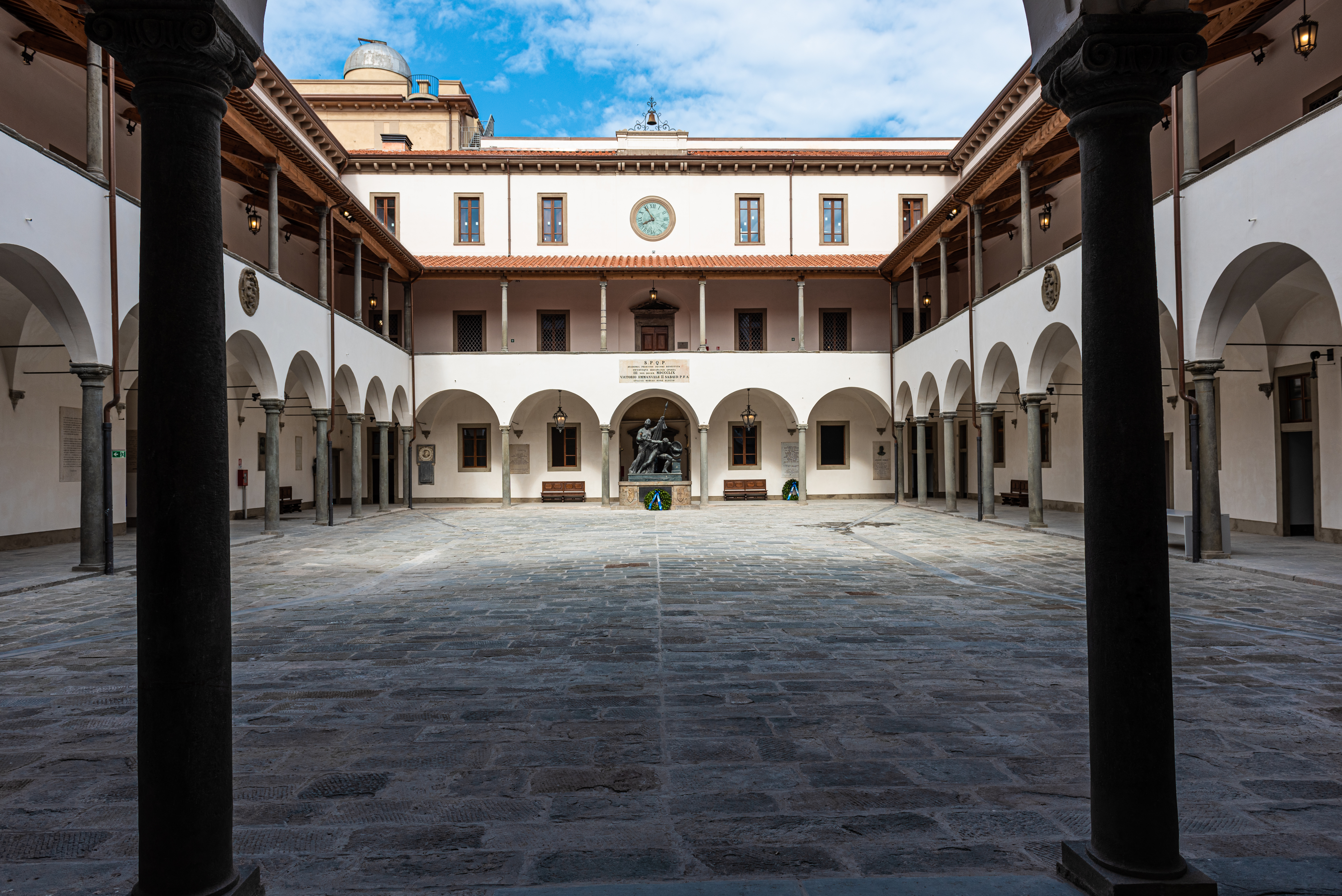
Palazzo della Sapienza's courtyard

The University of Pisa was officially founded in 1343, although various scholars place its origins in the 11th century. It is certain, however, that from the middle of the 12th century Pisa had a "Universitas" in the original sense of the word, that is, a group of students who gathered around masters. It was during this period that Leonardo Fibonacci was born and worked. He was one of the greatest mathematicians in history who, through his work, synthesized the spirit and processes of Greek geometry and the tools of Arabic mathematics for the first time in Europe.

The papal seal "In Supremae dignitatis", issued by Pope Clement VI on 3 September 1343, granted the Studium in Pisa the title of Studium Generale with various exclusive privileges, making it universally recognised. In medieval times, the Studium Generale was a higher institute of education founded or confirmed by a universal authority, namely the papacy or the empire. Pisa was among the first European cities to vaunt a papal attestation, followed by Prague in 1347 and Heidelberg in 1386. At the outset in Pisa, lessons in Theology, Civil Law, Canon Law and Medicine were established.

The first years of the new Studium were particularly difficult, although there is documentary evidence that shows persistent academic activity with a slow recovery starting in 1355.

The end of the 14th century and the beginning of the 15th century saw Pisa and its Studium heading towards a slow death. The war, which had allowed the Florentines to conquer the city, was so socially and economically damaging that it made preserving even the most essential academic activity impossible.

=== The Medicis and Galileo ===
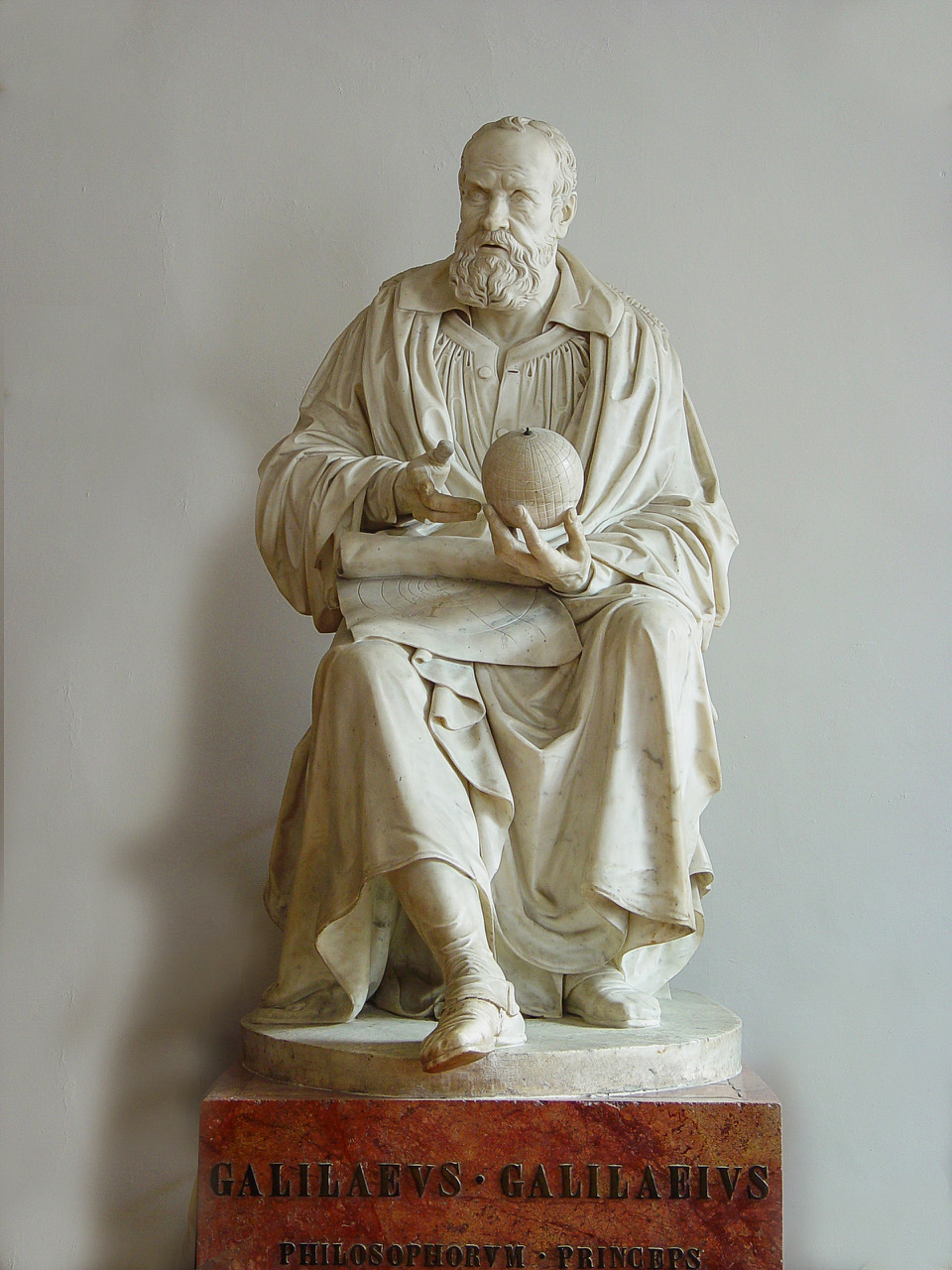
Galileo Galilei's statue in the Aula Magna Storica of Palazzo della Sapienza

During the first few days of November 1473, the Studium in Pisa began to develop systematically at the request of Lorenzo dei Medici. In 1486, the construction of a building specifically for lessons was commissioned: the building, the future Palazzo della Sapienza, still the centre of the present-day University, was placed in the 13th century Piazza del Grano, which could be reached through the gateway dell’Abbondanza. The image of the Cherub was placed above this gateway. In the Christian tradition, the Cherub represents an angelic being with a clearer vision of God, who in turn represents absolute knowledge. Since then, the Cherub has become the iconographic symbol of the University of Pisa and, in more recent times, the Order of the Cherub is awarded to members of the university teaching staff who have contributed to enhancing its prestige.

In 1497, the Pisan institute suffered a new period of decline and was moved to Florence for nine years. The rise to the throne of Duke Cosimo I dei Medici marked the beginning of a new era. The formal reopening of the university on 1 November 1543 was, in fact, considered to be a second founding. With the 1545 Statute, Cosimo managed to raise the quality of the teaching, making the University of Pisa one of the most important in Europe for both teaching and research. The Duke established the Chair of Simples (Semplici in Botany) and appointed Luca Ghini: between 1543 and 1544 the Garden of Simples was founded. This was the first botanical garden in the world annexed to a university Studium. A few decades later, the garden was moved to its present position a few dozen metres from Piazza dei Miracoli, covering an area of around three hectares with 6,000 cultivated plants and seeds exchanged with other 400 structures in the world. Ghini was succeeded by the philosopher and scientist Andrea Cesalpino, who created the first scientific method for the classification of plants and can be considered the forerunner of the discovery of the cardiovascular system.

Cosimo I was still ruling when Galileo Galilei was born on 15 February 1564 in Pisa. Galileo Galilei is universally thought of as the founder of modern science and the modern experimental method. He was initially a student and then a teacher of Mathematics at the University of Pisa before moving to Padova. It was in the city in Tuscany that he began the studies and experiments which were the basis of his revolutionary theories.

=== The house of Lorraine ===
The decline of the Grand Duchy of Tuscany (Medici), in the middle of the 18th century, saw the downfall of the Studium in Pisa, which only picked up again with the Lorraine dynasty. It was thanks to these enlightened innovators and reformers that numerous works and the establishment of the new Chairs of Experimental Physics and Chemistry were created.

The annexation of Tuscany to the Napoleonic Empire at the beginning of the 19th century brought about the transformation of the Studium into an imperial Academy: the university became a subsidiary of the University of Paris, even though it managed to retain a certain degree of autonomy. At that time, five faculties (Theology, Law, Medicine, Science and Arts), exams, different academic qualifications (bachelor, master and doctoral degrees) and degree theses came into being. The Scuola Normale Superiore was established between 1810 and 1813. It started out as a subsidiary of the École Normale in Paris and closed immediately to be reopened in 1846 with the inauguration of its present seat at Palazzo della Carovana in Piazza dei Cavalieri.

=== Restoration and Risorgimento ===
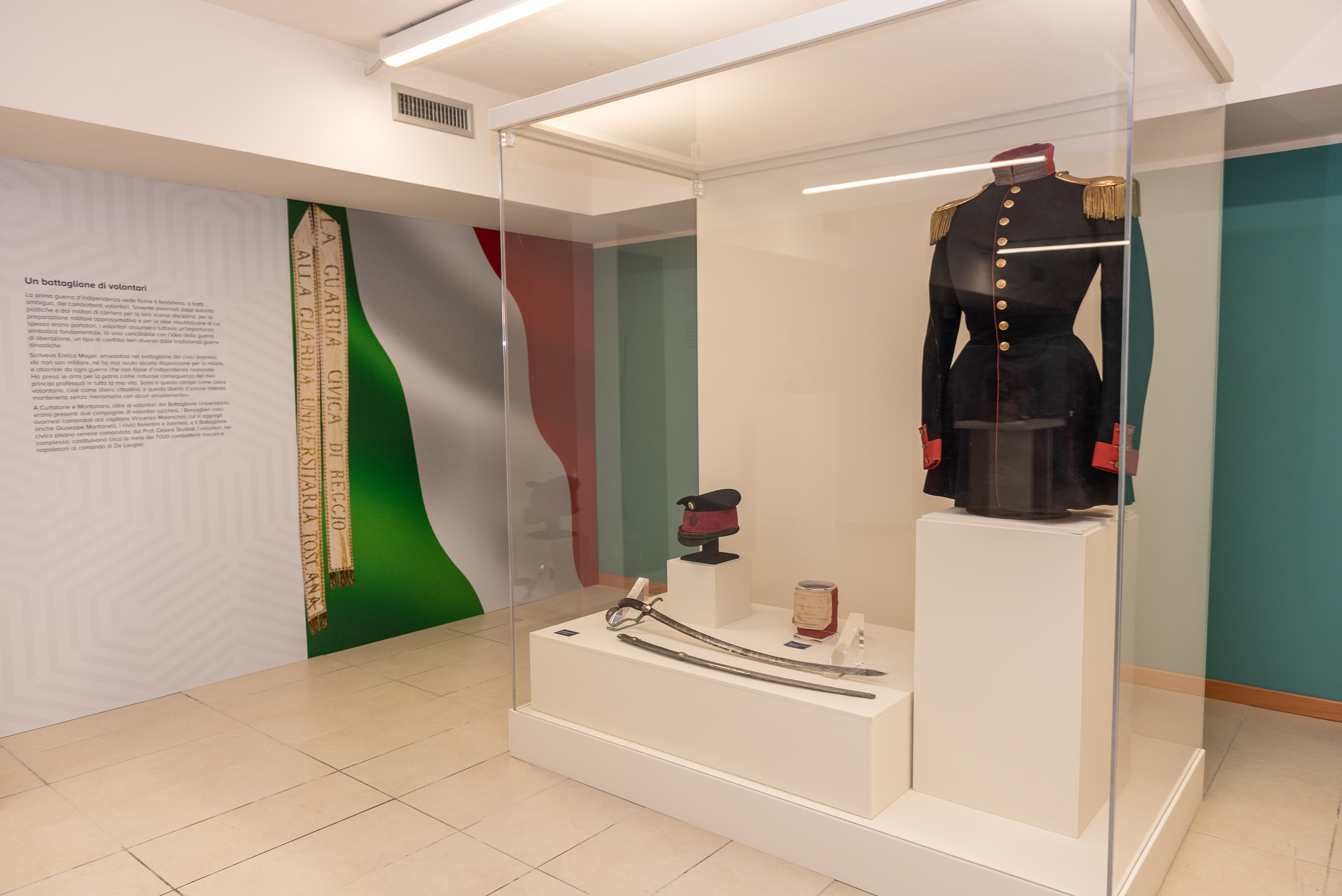
A view of the Exhibition on the 170th anniversary of the Battle of Curtatone and Montanara

The period of the Restoration led to a reconsideration of the organisation within the Studium, but not to the complete revocation of the Napoleonic experience. In 1826, lessons on Egyptology were introduced at the University of Pisa. This was a first in Europe and the world in general, leading to the renowned French-Tuscan expedition to Egypt between 1828 and 1829. In 1839, Pisa hosted the first congress of Italian scientists, which saw the participation of over 400 scholars and 300 experts in the various branches of knowledge from different states of the peninsula. It was during this period that the university was at the centre of the reform called for by Provveditore Gaetano Giorgini, which saw the faculties increase in number to six (Theology, Law, Arts, Medicine, Mathematics and Natural Sciences) and for the first time in the world, the Chair of Agriculture and sheep-farming was created and entrusted to Cosimo Ridolfi.

In the university and in the city, liberal and patriotic ideals were coming to the fore and these reached their peak when teachers and students formed a university battalion and joined the battle of Curtatone and Montanara in 1848. This was one of the most significant battles in the Italian Risorgimento. A memorial plaque in Palazzo della Sapienza commemorates the volunteers who "died fighting for the rebirth of Italy", while the Italian flag used by the university battalion was honoured with the gold military medal by the Italian Republic in 1948.

=== The Kingdom of Italy ===
With the creation of the Kingdom of Italy, the University of Pisa, which now counted around 560 matriculated students, re-emerged with all the faculties then present in the regulations and was acknowledged through the university reform of 1862, as one of the six principal national universities together with Turin, Pavia, Bologna, Naples and Palermo. The consolidation and expansion of the university, above all in the years straddling the 1800s and the 1900s, had a direct impact on the urban fabric development of the city even though the number of students increased only moderately (891 in 1912). The university gradually welcomed female students and in 1877, Ernestina Paper graduated in Medicine. She was the first woman to graduate from an Italian university and was followed by Cornelia Fabri in Mathematics and Erminia Pittaluga in Arts.

The reform called for by the minister Giovanni Gentile in 1923, further confirmed the university's prominent position at national level when it was placed among the ten universities totally funded by the state. Notwithstanding the aim to make Pisa a great "centre of university fascist culture" antifascist unrest was still alive, both in the academic community and among students. The application of racial laws, the first of which were signed by King Vittorio Emanuele III in 1938 at San Rossore, near Pisa, affected foreign and Italian students and university teachers severely, as was the case throughout Italy. It was not until 2018, in Pisa, 80 years after the signature, that there was an official and public admission of responsibility on behalf of the Italian universities (on the University of Pisa's own initiative).

=== The Republic ===
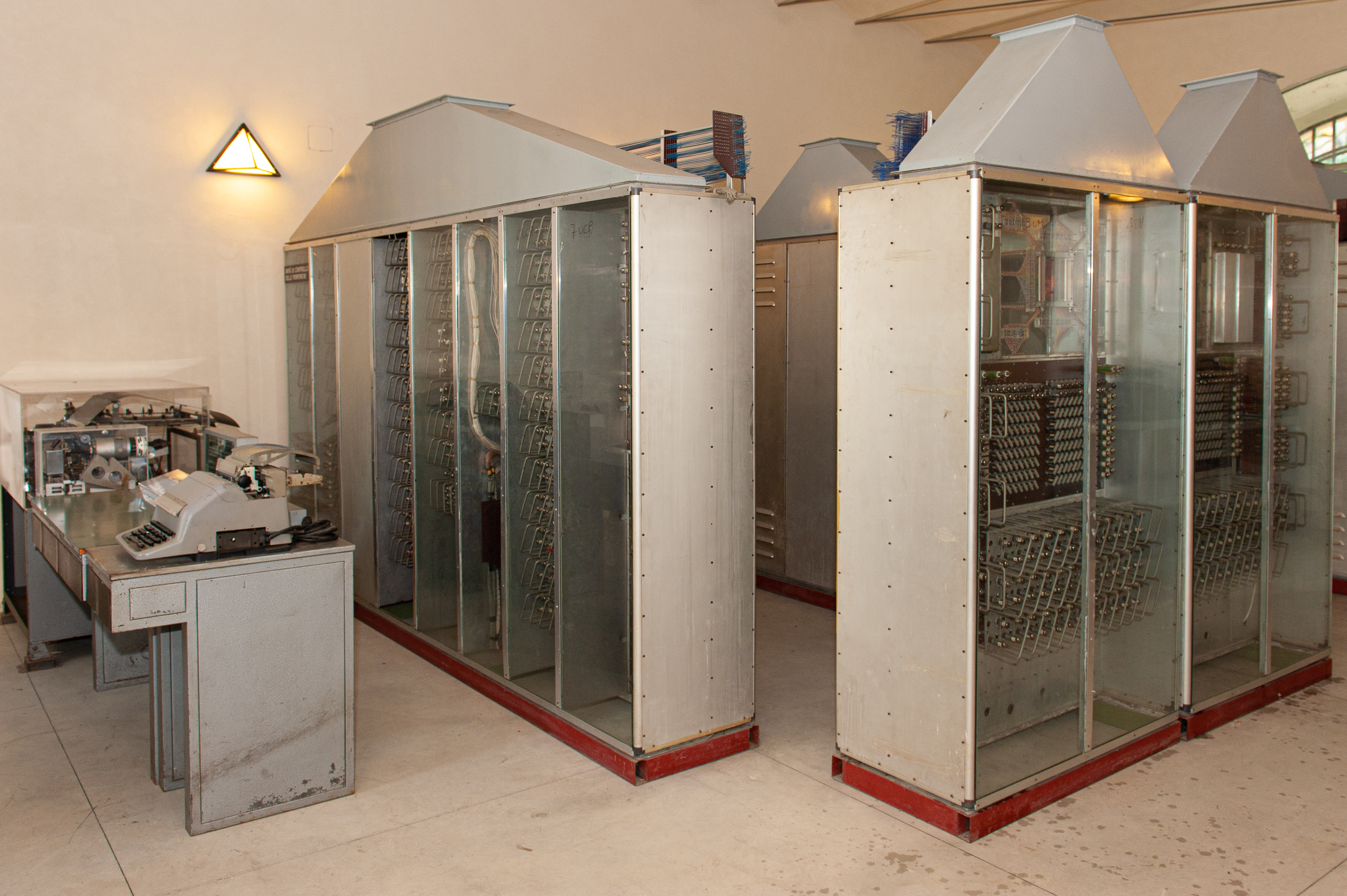
The Calcolatrice Elettronica Pisana (CEP), assembled in the Museum of Computing Machinery

The physical and moral destruction caused by the Second World War was soon overcome and the University of Pisa, whose matriculated students passed from 768 in 1945 to 1,292 in 1950, was able to lead the field in many areas of knowledge, adapting to the new demands of social, civil and economic life. The faculties of Economics and Business Studies (1948), and later Foreign Languages and Literature (1969) and Political Science (1970) joined the faculties present before the conflict – Engineering and Pharmacy – and accompanied the arrival of the university for the masses (between 1961 and 1972 student numbers in Pisa went from around 9,000 to 27,000). At the start of the sixties, the University of Pisa established the first Italian Chair of Film History and Criticism. In 1969, the degree course in Computer Science (Informatics) was set up. It was the first in Italy and followed the creation of the Pisan Electronic Calculator (CEP), designed in the mid-1950s and sponsored by Nobel Prize winner and graduate of the University of Pisa, Enrico Fermi, which was the basis for other firsts in Italy in its field. In 1986, for example, the first Italian link to the Internet originated in Pisa.

In 1967, the merger of the pre-existing colleges led to the creation of the Sant'Anna School of Advanced Studies and the Scuola Normale Superiore, forming a system of further education which is of the highest prestige at international level.

Also in 1967, during a period of protests, the "Tesi della Sapienza", one of the milestones of the 1968 student movement in Italy, were compiled in Pisa. This phase of the unrest was particularly animated in the city with some dramatic moments.

From the end of the 1970s, the University's Natural History Museum moved to the enchanting 14th century Charterhouse of Calci, a building of priceless historic and architectural worth. The museum houses numerous rooms dedicated to zoology, mineralogy and palaeontology as well as Italy's largest freshwater aquarium and Whale gallery with more than thirty whale skeletons exhibited in an ancient portico.

=== UniPi today ===
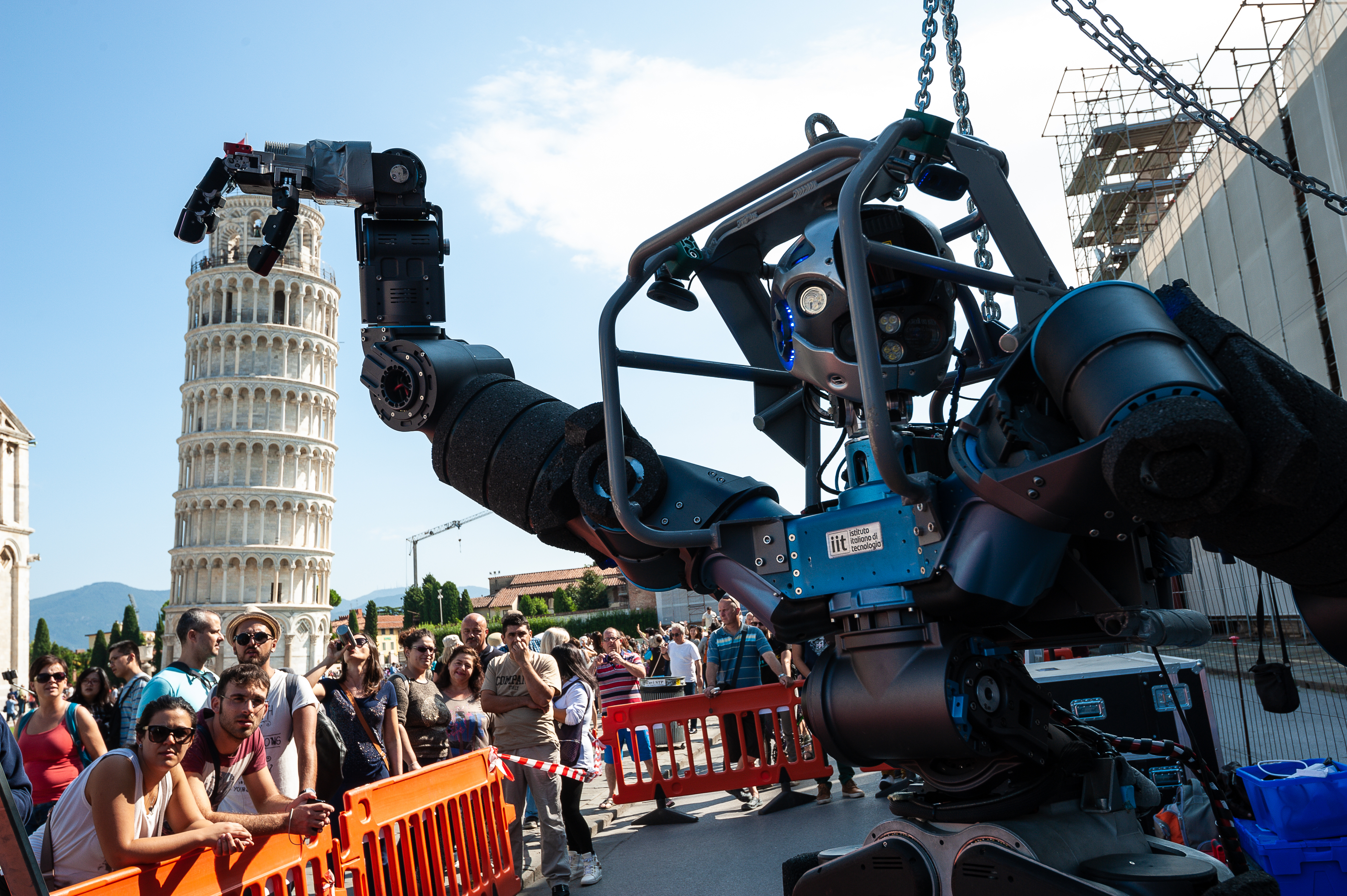
Humanoid robot of the Research Center "E.Piaggio" posing near the Tower of Pisa during the European Researchers' Night, 2015

The Ruberti reform of 1989, which envisaged the statutory autonomy of universities, forced the university to approve a new Statute, whose overall structure was only called into question with the so-called "Gelmini reform" in 2010. This led to the adoption of the 2012 Statute and the organizational layout which excluded the 11 Faculties in favour of 20 Departments.

At present, the university is divided into 20 Departments, with around 150 first and second level degree courses, and single cycle degree courses, more than 20 doctoral courses, 50 schools of specialisation and more than 60 postgraduate courses. There are more than 1,500 members of teaching staff and a slightly higher number of administrative personnel, technicians, foreign language assistants and librarians. There are around 50,000 students enrolled, and in a city with a population of approximately 90,000 inhabitants, this makes Pisa a true city campus. The students come mainly from Tuscany and Liguria, with a significant intake from many other regions, above all from the south of Italy. A sizeable number of the students are also foreign.

Among the many graduates of the University of Pisa are Nobel laureates Giosuè Carducci, Enrico Fermi, and Carlo Rubbia, Fields Medal recipients Enrico Bombieri and Alessio Figalli, Presidents of the Republic Giovanni Gronchi and Carlo Azeglio Ciampi, film directors Mario Monicelli, Paolo Taviani, and Vittorio Taviani, writers Tiziano Terzani and Antonio Tabucchi, and tenor Andrea Bocelli.

In 2025, the university signed an agreement with the Shiology Centre of Beijing's Renmin University, making it the first European university to reach such an agreement with the shiology centre. This agreement will lead to joint courses, seminars and international workshops as well as broader scientific and technological cooperation.

== Organization and administration ==
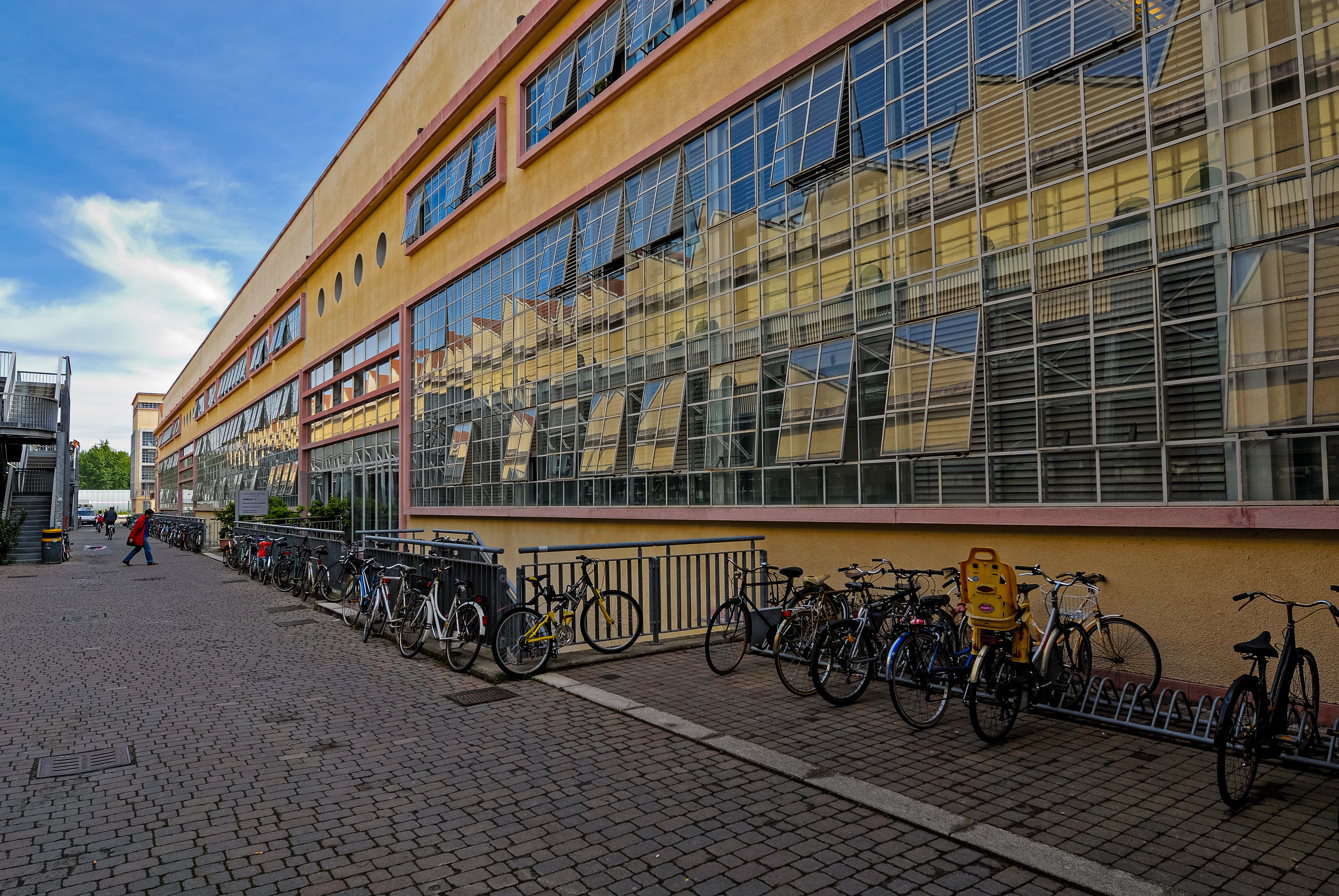
The "Polo Fibonacci"

The University of Pisa consists of 20 departments. These departments offer several courses in their related field of study:

- Civil and Industrial Engineering
- Economics and Management
- Energy, Systems, Territory and Construction Engineering
- Information Engineering
- Mathematics
- Physics
- Computer Science
- Chemistry and Industrial Chemistry
- Biology
- Earth Sciences
- Clinical and Experimental Medicine
- Surgical, Medical and Molecular Pathology and Critical Care Medicine
- Translational Research on New Technologies in Medicine and Surgery
- Pharmacy
- Humanities Civilisations and Forms of Knowledge
- Philology, Literature and Linguistics
- Law
- Political Science
- Agricultural, Environmental and Food Sciences
- Veterinary Sciences

PhD studies are usually offered and arranged by the departments. The lectures are mostly given in Italian, except for a number of courses at the faculty of foreign languages and literature, some scientific programmes, such as the international MSc in aerospace engineering (EuMAS), Master in Business Informatics, the Master of Science in Space Engineering and the Master in Computer Science and Networking, jointly offered with Scuola Superiore Sant'Anna. Students also have at their disposal a language centre, where they can attend courses in foreign languages, a sports centre (Cus Pisa) that arranges for many sports intramural leagues and allows sports practice in almost all the disciplines available in Italy, and six university refectories (Mense universitarie). The University of Pisa is not organized in the form of one unique campus, but rather its many buildings are scattered throughout the whole Pisa area, especially in the city centre.

== Rankings ==
University rankings

Global – Overall
- ARWU World: 201–300
- QS World: =343
- THE World: 301–350

National – Overall
- ARWU National: 1–3

- In 2011, the University of Pisa came in first place among the Italian universities, according to the Academic Ranking of World Universities and within the best 30 universities in Europe.
- Times Higher Education World University Rankings ranks University of Pisa among the 350 best world universities.
- Times Higher Education Europe Teaching Rankings ranks University of Pisa among the top 100 European Universities for teaching.
- QS World University Rankings ranks University of Pisa in the world's top 100 for Computer Science & Information Systems, Physics & Astronomy, Mathematics, Classics & Ancient History, Library & Information Management.
- The U.S. News & World Report places the University of Pisa among the world's 300 best universities.
- The European Research Ranking, a ranking based on publicly available data from the European Commission database, puts the University of Pisa among the best in Italy and the best performing European research institutions.

== Notable people ==
=== Alumni ===
In politics and government, notable people who have attended the University of Pisa include Italian political leaders such as Giacomo Acerbo, Giuliano Amato, Sandro Bondi, Maria Chiara Carrozza, Carlo Azeglio Ciampi, Massimo D'Alema, Giovanni Gronchi, Guido Buffarini Guidi, Enrico Letta, Antonio Maccanico, Fabio Mussi, Alessandro Natta, Marcello Pera, Enrico Rossi, Carlo Sforza, Sidney Sonnino, and Paolo Emilio Taviani, Foreign political leaders such as Deputy Prime Minister of Albania Spiro Koleka, Ambassador Marcello Spatafora, Prime Ministers of Greece Ioannis Kolettis and Diomidis Kyriakos, Haitian President René Préval, Nicaraguan President Adan Cardenas, and Prime Minister of Somalia Ali Mohammed Ghedi.

In theology, notable alumni include Archbishop Giovanni Battista Rinuccini, Cardinals Benedetto Accolti the Younger, Pietro Accolti, Francesco Barberini, Cesare Borgia, Giovanni Antonio Guadagni, Francisco de Remolins, Francesco Martelli, Bandino Panciatici, Raffaele Riario, Giovanni Battista Tolomei, and Popes Clement IX, Clement XII, Leo X, Paul III, Urban VIII, Chief Rabbi Elio Toaff, and Minister Angus Morrison.

In sciences, notable alumni include Astrophysicists Paolo Farinella, Franco Pacini, Viviana Acquaviva, Biophysicist Clara Franzini-Armstrong, Botanist Giovanni Arcangeli, Geneticist Guido Pontecorvo, and Mathematicians Aldo Andreotti, Enrico Betti, Vincenzo Brunacci, Cesare Burali-Forti, Bonaventura Cavalieri, Guglielmo Libri Carucci dalla Sommaja, Giovanni Ceva, Luigi Fantappiè, Alessio Figalli, Guido Fubini, Christopher Hacon, Giuseppe Lauricella, Salvatore Pincherle, Ferdinando Pio Rosellini, Giovanni Salvemini, Carlo Somigliana, Vito Volterra, Guido Zappa, Neurologist Francois Boller, Neuroscientist Emilio Bizzi, Physicians Vincenzo Chiarugi, Paolo Macchiarini, Francesco Redi, and François Carlo Antommarchi, Physicists Adolfo Bartoli, Temistocle Calzecchi-Onesti, Ennio Candotti, Nello Carrara, Enrico Fermi, Galileo Galilei, Luca Gammaitoni, Antonio Pacinotti, Eligio Perucca, Luigi Puccianti, Franco Rasetti, Vasco Ronchi, and Carlo Rubbia.

In other fields, notable alumni include Lawyer Francesca Albanese, Egyptologists Sergio Donadoni, Edda Bresciani, Gianluca Miniaci and Ippolito Rosellini, Fashion model Tania Bambaci, Film directors Mario Monicelli, Paolo Virzì and Simone Rapisarda Casanova, Historians Carlo Ginzburg, Camillo Porzio, and Mario Rosa, Librettist Giacinto Andrea Cicognini, Philologist Gian Biagio Conte, Philosophers Francesco Cattani da Diacceto, Aldo Gargani, Giovanni Gentile, Anna Camaiti Hostert, Eufrosin Poteca, and Jiyuan Yu, Physiologist Hugo Kronecker, Tenors Andrea Bocelli and Francesco Rasi, Agronomist Nazareno Strampelli, Anatomist Atto Tigri, Art historian and curator Carolyn Christov-Bakargiev, Civil engineer Henry Willey Reveley, Civil servant Bruno Ferrante, Computer scientists Elisa Bertino, Luca Cardelli, and Roberto Di Cosmo, Diplomat Carlo Andrea Pozzo di Borgo, Economists Luigi Bodio and Paolo Malanima, Engineer Giacinto Morera, Intellectual Adriano Sofri, International civil servant Francesco Cappè, Journalists Lando Ferretti and Tiziano Terzani, Jurists Giuseppe Averani, Piero Calamandrei, Francesco Carrara, Antonio Cassese, Giovanni Lami, Remus Opreanu, Italian Constitutional Court Judge Sabino Cassese, Linguists Stefano Arduini and Luigi Rizzi, Nobel Laureate in Literature Giosuè Carducci, Managers Pier Francesco Guarguaglini, Luca Desiata, Naturalist Gaetano Savi, Poets Vincenzo da Filicaja, Giovanni Battista Guarini, and Mauro Nervi, Psychiatrist Silvano Arieti, Racing car and engine designer Carlo Chiti, Surgeon Andrea Vaccá Berlinghieri, Writers Pietro Citati, Francesco Domenico Guerrazzi, Margaret King, Antonio Tabucchi, and Zoologist Enrico Hillyer Giglioli.

=== Faculty and staff ===
Prominent scholars who have taught at the University of Pisa include Anatomists Lorenzo Bellini and Marcello Malpighi, Chemist Robert Schiff, Computer scientist Egon Börger, Engineer Corradino D'Ascanio, Mathematicians Eugenio Beltrami, Enrico Bombieri, Giovanni Alfonso Borelli, Sergio Campanato, Benedetto Castelli, Corrado De Concini, Ennio De Giorgi, Luigi Guido Grandi, Alessandro Marchetti, Claudio Procesi, Leonida Tonelli, Pathologist Angelo Maffucci, Physicians Pietro Grocco and Paolo Mascagni, Physicists Bernard H. Lavenda, Carlo Matteucci, Roy McWeeny, Giulio Racah, Gian-Carlo Wick, Zoologist Enrica Calabresi, Economist Giuseppe Toniolo, Egalitarian Philippe Buonarroti, Historians Jože Pirjevec and Pasquale Villari, Journalist Luciano Bianciardi, Jurists Francesco Accarigi, Carlo Costamagna, Bartolus de Saxoferrato, Baldus de Ubaldis, Linguist Mauro Cristofani, Philosophers Armando Carlini, Arnold Davidson, Dominic of Flanders, Lorenzo Magalotti, Ugo Spirito, Poets David Levi, Valerio Magrelli, Giovanni Pascoli, 16th-century scholar Girolamo Maggi, and Writer Bernard Comment.

== See also ==
- École Normale Supérieure
- ICoN Interuniversity Consortium for Italian Studies
- List of Italian universities
- List of medieval universities
- Pisa Charterhouse Natural History Museum
- Sant'Anna School of Advanced Studies
- Scuola Normale Superiore di Pisa
- Superior Graduate Schools in Italy
