= Consorzio ICoN =

The Consorzio ICoN is an interuniversity consortium for Italian Studies established in 1999. It consists of 21 Italian universities and focuses on philology and cultural studies. The consortium is based and administrated at the University of Pisa and is supported by the Italian Ministry of University and Research (Ministero dell'Università e della Ricerca). It aims at diffusing Italian language, culture and literature.

== Participants ==
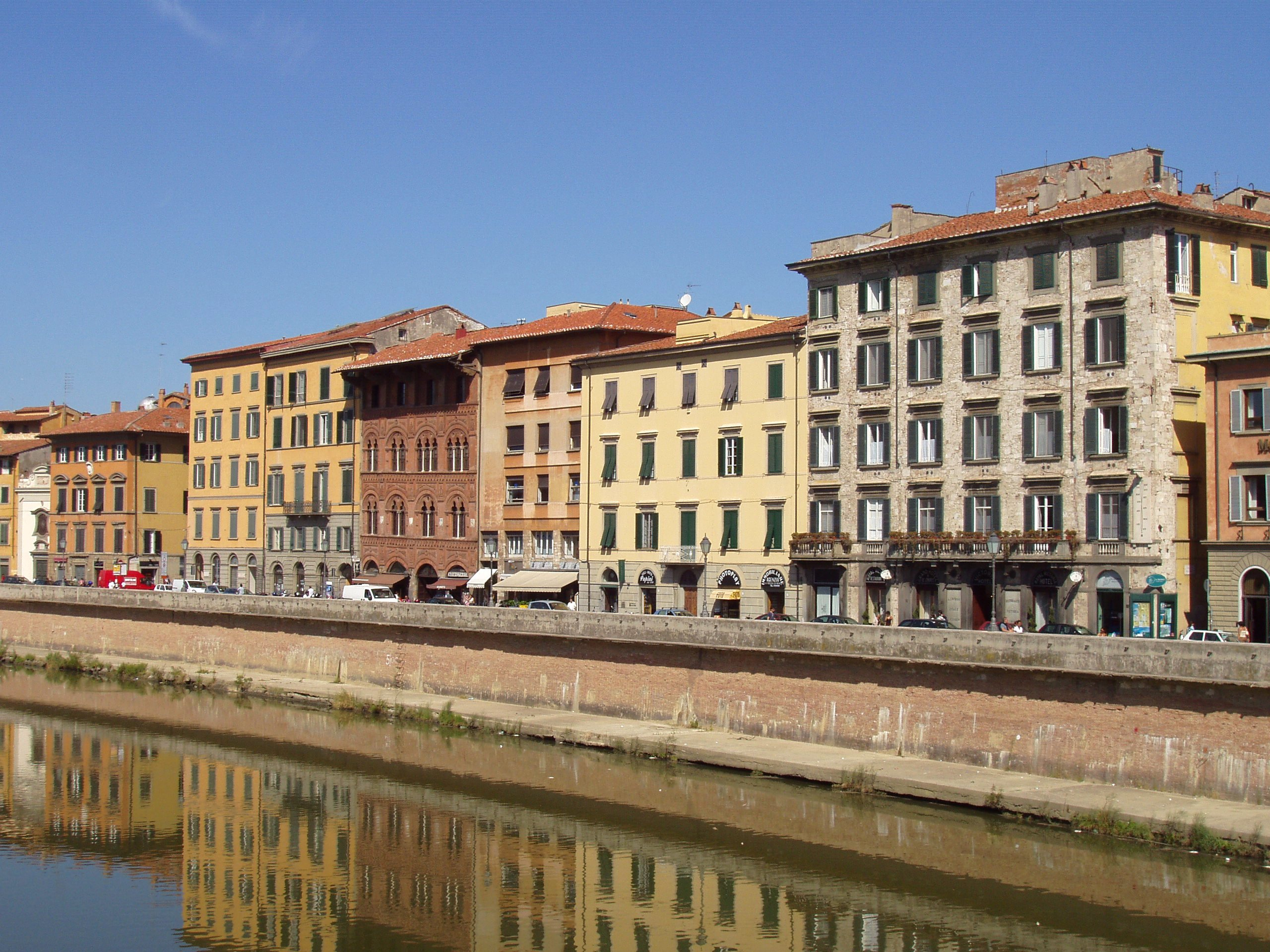
The Consrzio ICoN has its seat at Lungarno Pacinotti in Pisa.

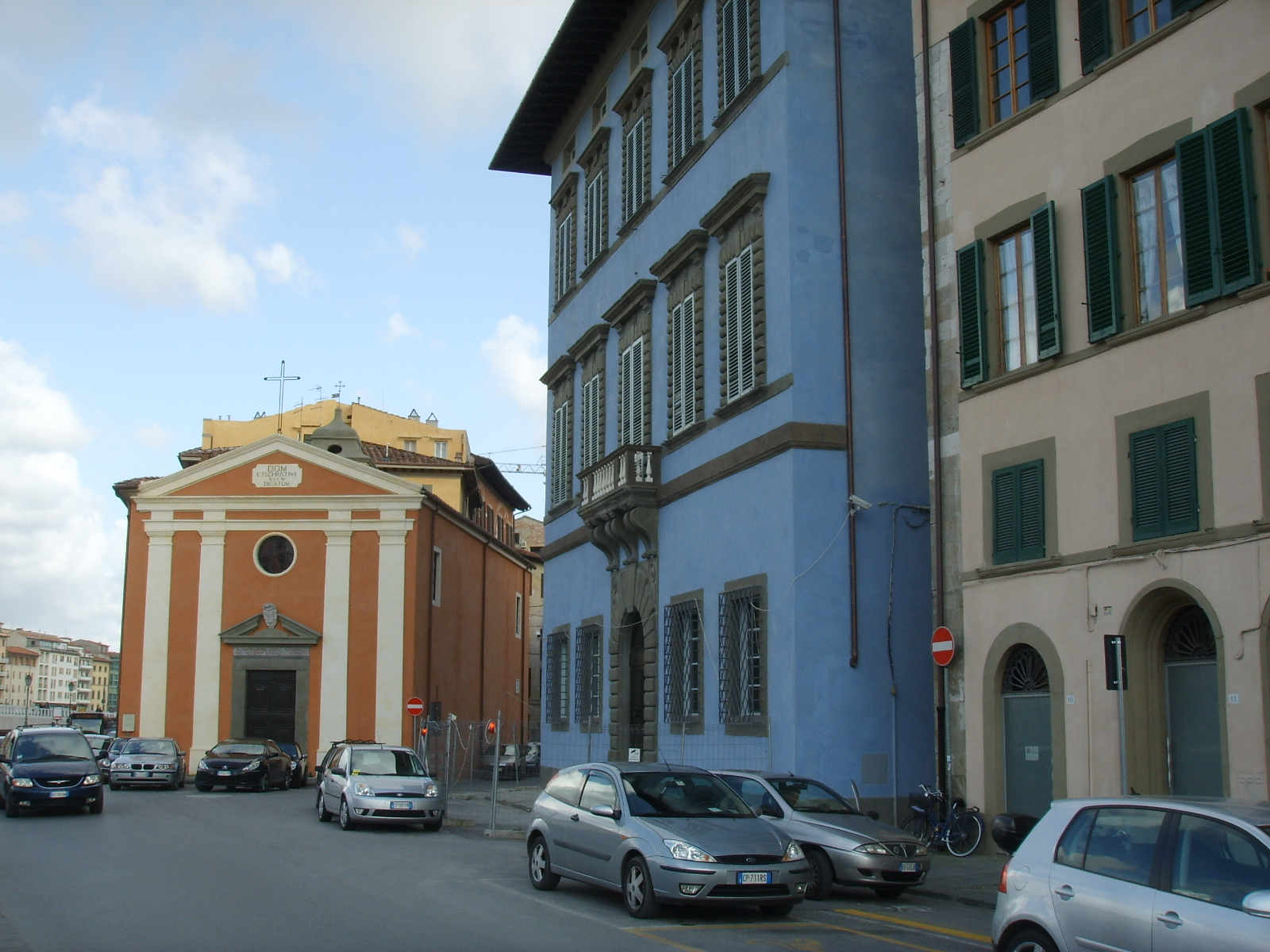
The administration is based at Piazza dei Facchini next to the Palazzo Blu in Pisa.

ICoN

The universities forming the consortium are

- University of Bari (Università degli Studi di Bari)
- University of Bologna (Università degli Studi di Bologna)
- University of Cassino (Università degli Studi di Cassino)
- University of Catania (Università degli Studi di Catania)
- University of Genoa (Università degli Studi di Genova)
- University of Milan (Università degli Studi di Milano)
- IULM University of Milan (Libera Università di lingue e comunicazione IULM)
- Naples Eastern University (Università degli Studi di Napoli "L'Orientale")
- University of Padua (Università degli Studi di Padova)
- University of Parma (Università degli Studi di Parma)
- University of Pavia (Università degli Studi di Pavia)
- University for Foreigners Perugia (Università per Stranieri di Perugia)
- University of Pisa (Università degli Studi di Pisa)
- Sant'Anna School of Advanced Studies (Scuola Superiore di Studi Universitari e di Perfezionamento Sant'Anna di Pisa)
- Sapienza University of Rome (Sapienza Università di Roma)
- University of Rome Tor Vergata (Università degli Studi di Roma "Tor Vergata")
- Roma Tre University (Università degli Studi Roma Tre)
- University of Salerno (Università degli Studi di Salerno)
- Foreigners University of Siena (Università per Stranieri di Siena)
- University of Trento (Università degli Studi di Trento)
- University of Turin (Università degli Studi di Torino)
- Ca' Foscari University of Venice (Università "Cà Foscari" di Venezia)

== Bachelor's degree ==
The University of Pisa, in collaboration with the consortium, offers a bachelor's degree program in Italian philology and cultural studies (Corso di laurea triennale in Lingua e cultura italiana per stranieri) for foreigners and expatriates, based on distance education and e-learning. The program refers to the bachelor's degree class L-10 (literary studies) and offers four majors in

- linguistics and didactics,
- literature,
- arts and
- history and culture.

Exams are carried out at institutions in the country of residence (partner universities, Italian embassies). The title will be issued by the administrative university, actually Pisa, mentioning all participating universities. As Italy is part of European Higher Education Area, the program has a value of 180 ECTS points and permits to participate in a Master's degree program.

== Master's degrees ==
The ICoN consortium organizes three executive master's degrees (60 ECTS) in the field of Italian studies. They consist of phases of attendance, distance education and e-learning. The offer includes

- Specialized translation (English–Italian), issued by the Universities of Pisa, Bari and Genoa
- Didactics of Italian language and literature, issued by the Foreigner Universities of Perugia and Siena
- Cultural heritage management, issued by the University of Parma

== Language courses ==
The consortium ICoN also offers language courses and programs in written Italian at distinct levels. For native English speakers special packages have been designed in collaboration with the National Italian American Foundation and the University of California's department of Italian. The courses have been awarded with the European Commission's European Language Label.
