= Cappe =

Cappe is a surname. Notable people with the surname include:

- Catharine Cappe (1744–1821), British writer and philanthropist
- Francesco Cappè (born 1971), Italian United Nations official
- Jeanne Cappe (1895–1956), Belgian journalist and writer
- Mel Cappe (born 1948), Canadian civil servant and diplomat
- Newcome Cappe (1733–1800), English unitarian
- Noah Cappe (born 1977), Canadian actor and television presenter
