= Community Access Program =

Former Canadian government program

The Community Access Program (CAP, also seen as C@P) was an initiative of the Government of Canada which aimed to provide Canadians with affordable public access to the Internet and the skills they need to use it effectively. The program was administered by Industry Canada.

== History ==
In 1994 the Community Access Program began. Initially, Industry Canada focused on rural communities, where Internet access was less available. Once the rural communities were equipped with computers and Internet access, Industry Canada focused on what is referred to as the digital divide. According to Statistics Canada 2001, the following groups were the most in need of CAP services: Indigenous people, older Canadians, those with low incomes or education, francophones, new immigrants, and people in rural areas. Therefore, the focus was primarily to assist in bridging the digital divide.

CAP sites in rural and urban areas were then opened to help reach these people. The program played a crucial role in bridging the digital divide; contributing to the foundation for electronic access to government services; encouraging online learning and literacy; fostering the development of community-based infrastructure; promoting Canadian e-commerce; and providing training with assistive technology.

The CAP program was terminated on March 31, 2012 as funding for the program was not renewed. Industry Canada stated that the program had reached its objective, and cited challenging fiscal times. Some provinces maintained their programs due to financial contributions from the provincial government, municipalities and libraries. The CAP Youth Initiative program continued to receive funding until March 31, 2017.

Industry Canada logo

== Youth Initiative ==
In order to make better use of the computers and equipment funded by CAP, Industry Canada also initiated the Community Access Program – Youth Initiative (CAP YI). CAP sites could apply for funding to hire youth interns to train the public in computer and Internet use and technology. The YI program was coordinated by CAP and funded through the Youth Employment Strategy (YES) of Canada – overseen by Human Resources and Social Development Canada (HRSDC). The program aimed to provide employment opportunities for young Canadians between the ages of 15 and 30 – primarily students, recent graduates, or the under-employed or unemployed.

== Locations ==
CAP gave thousands of Canadians affordable access to the Internet. CAP sites were located in public locations such as schools, community centers, and libraries. They provided access in locations that are geographically remote (e.g. on parts of Cape Breton Island) or served populations subject to the digital divide. Sites were established and maintained by community networks, generally in partnership with municipal and provincial governments. There were CAP sites in all of the provinces and territories of Canada.

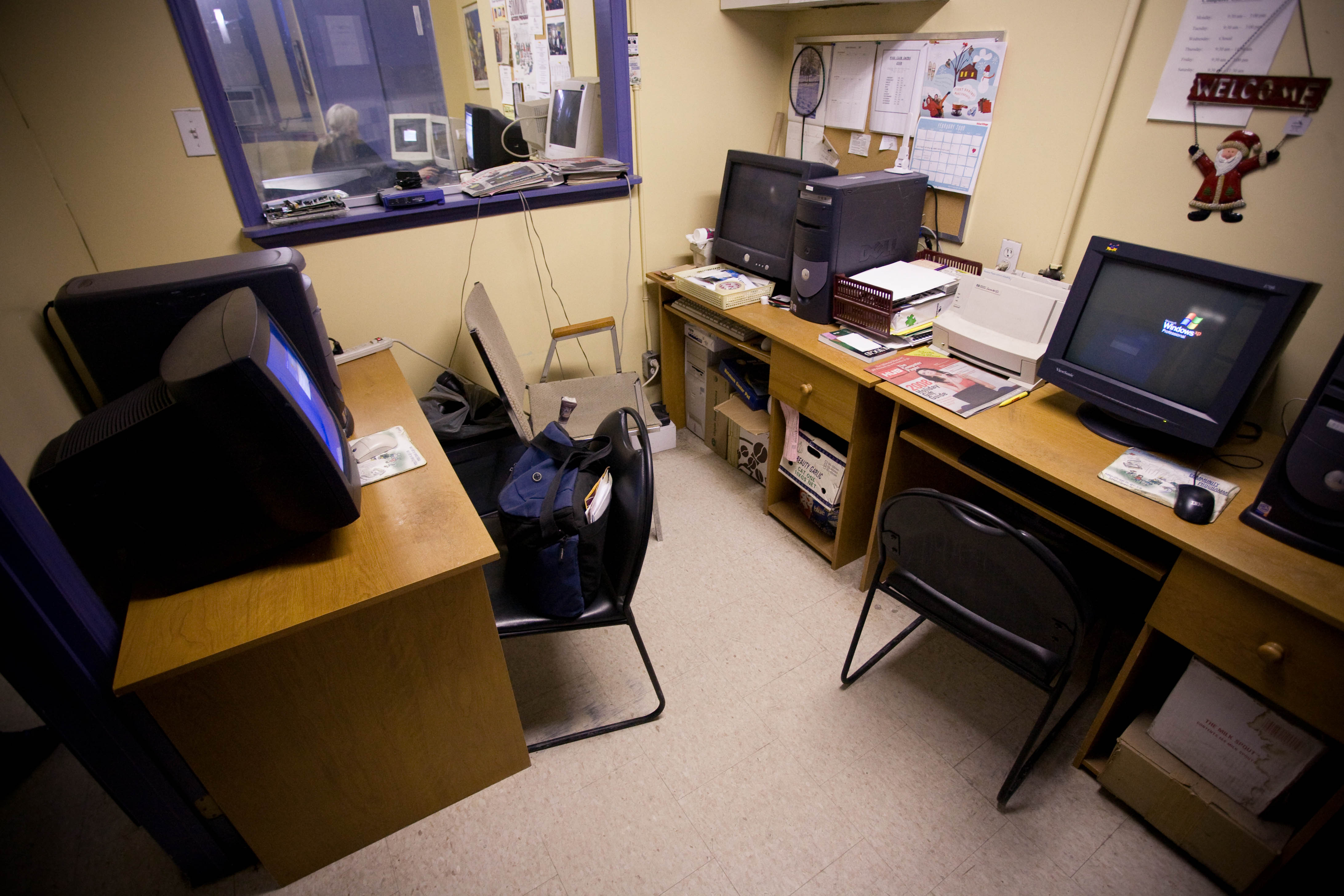
A CAP site in St. James Town, Toronto

=== Nova Scotia ===
The Nova Scotia CAP continued after the loss of federal funding in 2012, and continues to operate as @NS as of 2020.
