= Capitulum =

capitulum (plural capitula) may refer to:

- the Latin word for chapter
  - an index or list of chapters at the head of a gospel manuscript
  - a short reading in the Liturgy of the Hours
    - derived from which, it is the Latin for the assembly known as a chapter
  - a typographic symbol (⸿), to mark chapters or paragraphs, now evolved into the pilcrow

== Botany ==
- Capitulum (flower), a type of flower head composed of numerous tiny florets, characteristic of the family Asteraceae
- Capitulum (moss), the top of a Sphagnum moss plant with compact clusters of young branches; also the apothecium (fruiting body) of lichens of the order Calicium

== Zoology ==
- the capitulum of the humerus in vertebrates
- the gnathosoma of ticks and mites
- in stalked barnacles, the armoured portion within which the appendages and most of the viscera are located
- Capitulum (genus), a genus of goose barnacles
- a part of the female Lepidoptera genitalia
- a structure similar to an elaiosome, found on the eggs of some species of stick insects

== See also ==
- Capitulary, a type of legislative or administrative act issued by the Frankish court in the 9th century
