= Citizens' Action Party =

Citizens' Action Party may refer to:

- Citizens' Action Party (Costa Rica)
- Citizens' Action Party (Nicaragua)
- Citizen Action Party – Sikkim
- Akbayan, or Akbayan Citizens' Action Party, in the Philippines
