= Canadians Advocating Political Participation =

Canadians Advocating Political Participation (CAPP) is a national grassroots organization which seeks to engage Canadians on political matters. They have chapters in Vancouver, Calgary, Montreal, Ottawa, and Toronto, and are continuing to expand their network.

== Mandate ==
CAPP is committed to the following goals:

1. 1) To defend and improve Canada's democratic institutions and procedures;
2. 2) To foster dialogue and awareness of current political issues;
3. 3) To educate Canadians on their political system;
4. 4) To encourage greater democratic participation by all Canadians.

== Board of directors ==
CAPP was founded by Alberta resident Shilo Davis. The organization is currently governed by a Board of Directors at the national level, and by a Board of Directors in the individual chapters.

== Controversy ==
CAPP has been routinely followed and attacked by left-wing extremist organizations "Canadians Rallying to Unseat Stephen Harper" (CRUSH) and "Canadians Defending Democracy" (CDD). The large overlap has led many observers to claim CAPP is left-wing, despite the Board of Directors denying such a label. They maintain they are nonpartisan, although left-wing members often dominate the message boards with anti-conservative blogs.

== Notable work ==
=== Supporting Occupy Wall Street Protests ===
CAPP made the controversial decision to support the Occupy Wall Street protests, with many of the more conservative members decrying the involvement of CAPP in such a charged event when CAPP is supposedly nonpartisan. Left-wing members attended and supported the protests, including Ottawa Chapter leader and former Green Party of Canada candidate Alex Hill.

=== Anti-prorogation protests ===
CAPP was involved in the 2010 Canada anti-prorogation protests, stating they did not believe in Prime Minister Stephen Harper's reasons to prorogue, although protesting the prorogation was not their only advocacy.

=== Improving the decorum in the House of Commons ===
CAPP has also been involved in calls for the need to reform Question Period and overall decorum in the Canadian House of Commons. They back Conservative MP Michael Chong's bill in 2010, which would have called upon MP's to use respectful language and address each other respectfully, among other goals.
