= Capp (surname) =

Capp is a surname. Notable people with the surname include:

- Al Capp (1909–1979), American cartoonist and humorist
- David A. Capp (born 1950), American attorney
- Dick Capp (born 1942), American football player
- Frank Capp (1931–2017), American jazz drummer
- Sally Capp, Australian politician
- Terry Capp, Canadian drag racer
- Thomas Capp (died 1635), English painter and gilder
