= Ceramide-activated protein phosphatase =

Enzyme grouping

Ceramide-activated protein phosphatases (CAPPs) are a group of enzymes that are activated by the lipid second messenger ceramide. Known CAPPs include members of the protein phosphatase 1 (PP1) and protein phosphatase 2A (PP2A) families. CAPPs are a subset of intracellular serine/threonine phosphatases. Each CAPP consists of a catalytic subunit which confers phosphatase activity and a regulatory subunit which confers substrate specificity. CAPP involvement has been implicated in glycogen metabolism, apoptotic pathways related to cancer and other cellular pathways related to Alzheimer’s disease.

== Structure ==
=== Ceramide-activated PP2A ===
As a member of the PP2A family, CAPPs can consist of one to three PP2A subunits (Janssens & Goris, 2001). The core enzyme consists of a conserved 34 kilodalton (kDa) catalytic subunit, C, and a conserved 65 kDa scaffold subunit, A, tightly bound to one another (Janssens & Goris, 2001). The scaffold subunit contains 15 tandem HEAT repeats which arrange to form a horseshoe-like structure that confers remarkable conformational flexibility (Groves, Hanlon, Turowski, Hemmings & Barford, 1999). Each repeat contains a pair of highly conserved antiparallel α-helices which form a contiguous ridge (Groves et al., 1999). The catalytic subunit recognizes and associates with the scaffold subunit through this ridge (Groves et al., 1999). Two other regulatory subunit families, the 55 kDa B family and the 61 kDa B' family, can both bind the core enzyme in a mutually exclusive manner (Janssens & Goris, 2001). The B' subunit is similar in structure to the scaffold subunit and makes extensive interactions with the scaffold subunit, through a convex surface with eight HEAT repeats, and the catalytic subunit (Janssens & Goris, 2001). A concave, acidic region of the B' subunit is tilted towards the active site of the catalytic subunit in the holoenzyme (Janssens & Goris, 2001). The B subunit contains seven WD40 repeats, a β-hairpin handle and other secondary structures that form a β-propeller (Janssens & Goris, 2001). The β-propeller and β-hairpin handle interact with HEAT repeats three to seven and one to two on the scaffold subunit, respectively (Janssens & Goris, 2001). The B subunit has little interaction with the catalytic subunit but also contains an acidic substrate binding site positioned near the active site of the catalytic subunit (Janssens & Goris, 2001). The B subunits share no sequence identity with B' subunits (Janssens & Goris, 2001). CAPPs can be present as the core dimeric enzyme of AC or a trimeric holoenzyme of ABC or AB’C (Janssens & Goris, 2001). Ceramide has also been shown to activate the C subunit alone (Janssens & Goris, 2001). There are two isoforms, α and β, of the C and A subunits (Janssens & Goris, 2001). There are four isoforms, α, β γ and δ, of the B subunit and five isoforms α, β, γ, δ, and ɛ of the B' subunit (Janssens & Goris, 2001). The combinations of these isoforms give a possibility of 40 distinct CAPPs.

=== Ceramide-activated PP1 ===
Long-chain ceramides have also been shown to activate members of the PP1 family (Chalfant et al., 1999). The CAPPs in this family are composed of a catalytic subunit that can associate with one of over a dozen regulatory subunits (Egloff et al., 1997). The regulatory subunits interact with the catalytic subunit through a conserved RVXF motif (Egloff et al., 1997). When this binding site is deleted from regulatory proteins, they lose the ability to associate with the catalytic subunit (Egloff et al., 1997). There is only one recognition site on the catalytic subunit, making the association of a regulatory subunit mutually exclusive (Egloff et al., 1997). The catalytic subunit of ceramide-activated PP1 is a single-domain protein consisting of a central β-sandwich, of two mixed β-sheets, with seven α-helices surrounding the sandwich on one side and a sub-domain consisting of three α-helices and a β-sheet on the opposite side (Egloff et al., 1997). Three loops that connect β-sheets with α-helices in the top β-sandwich strand form a β-α-β-α-β motif that interacts with loops form the opposite β-sandwich sheet to provide the catalytic residues (Egloff et al., 1997).

== Activators and inhibitors ==
In general, CAPP expression is controlled by an autoregulatory translational mechanism and with the developmental regulation of CAPP subunits (Janssens & Goris, 2001). Ceramide is the defining activator of CAPP while other activators include theophylline and sodium selenate. Mechanisms for their modes of activation are unknown and more research is needed to explore and identify new CAPP activators. I_{1}^{PP2A} and I_{2}^{PP2A} inhibit all possible forms of CAPP by associating with the catalytic subunit using their C-terminal domains (Li, Makkinje, & Damuni, 1996). Both inhibitors are potent and non-competitive (Li et al., 1996). It is also suggested that both inhibitors are conserved between mice and humans and that both are also about the same mass (Janssens & Goris, 2001). Okadaic acid is commonly used for producing cellular models without CAPP activity (Hannun, 1996).

=== I_{2}^{PP2A} ===
I_{2}^{PP2A} does not inhibit CAPP in vitro but has been proven to inhibit CAPP in vivo (Janssens & Goris, 2001). I_{2}^{PP2A} mainly acts as an inhibitor by binding to the catalytic subunit, causing a conformational change, and rendering it non-functional (Janssens & Goris, 2001). In the presence of physiological Mn^{2+} concentrations, I_{2}^{PP2A} can associate with and stimulate the activity of PP1 but Mn^{2+} does not seem to affect the inhibition of PP2A through I_{2}^{PP2A}, in vitro (Janssens & Goris, 2001).

I_{2}^{PP2A} has also been identified as a truncated SET protein (Janssens & Goris, 2001). SET proteins, such as I_{2}^{PP2A} have been shown to associate with nucleoporins to form fusion proteins that can inhibit the activity of ceramide-activated PP2A and contribute to leukaemia pathogenesis (Janssens & Goris, 2001). Studies also show that leukemic fusion proteins can associate with SET and co-immunoprecipitate with CAPP, suggesting that the inhibitory role of I_{2}^{PP2A} may be involved in regulating cell growth in leukemia (Zhu et al., 2006).

=== I_{1}^{PP2A} ===
I_{1}^{PP2A} is a CAPP inhibitor both in vitro and in vivo and has been identified as a PHAP-1 protein (Li et al., 1996). I_{1}^{PP2A} has a highly acidic C-terminal tail and the N-terminus is leucine/isoleucine rich (Li et al., 1996). In the presence of physiological conditions of Mn^{2+}, I_{1}^{PP2A} can also associate with and stimulate the activity of PP1 but Mn^{2+} also does not affect the inhibition of PP2A through I_{1}^{PP2A}, in vitro (Janssens & Goris, 2001).

When I_{1}^{PP2A} is over expressed in mice, researchers observe a reduction in neurite length, indicating that CAPP may be involved in supporting neurite growth (Mutz et al., 2006). Increased levels of I_{1}^{PP2A} are associated with the regulation of tau proteins, suggesting that CAPP may play a role in Alzheimer’s disease (Wang et al., 2015).

=== Okadaic acid ===
Okadaic acid is a complex fatty acid polyether and a potent CAPP inhibitor (Hannun, 1996). Okadaic acid is mainly used as a research tool to characterize serine/threonine phosphatases, such as CAPP, through inhibition (Hannun, 1996).

=== Ceramide ===
Ceramide is a lipid secondary messenger that has been linked to aspects of the cellular stress response (Janssens & Goris, 2001). Products of sphingomyelin metabolism, activated by stress, seem to react with sphingolipids to liberate ceramide (Dobrowsky, R.T. 1992). The ceramide from this cycle can activate CAPP which then participates in various pathways (Dobrowsky, R.T. 1992).

=== Sodium selenate ===
How sodium selenate specifically activates ceramide-activated PP2A has not been well studied. Sodium selenate increases PP2A activity which decreases tau hyperphosphorylation, indicating that CAPPs may be manipulated to affect brain function (Tan et al., 2016). In addition, an increase in PP2A induced by sodium selenate also inhibits the PI3K/AKT pathway, implying that sodium selenate can induce changes in cell morphology and motility (Tsukamoto, Hama, Kogure, & Tsuchiya, 2013). AKT inhibition caused by sodium selenate seems to be physiologically effective at low concentrations (Tsukamoto et al., 2013).

=== Theophylline ===
Only one study, as of yet, has identified theophylline as an activator of ceramide-activated PP2A. The study indicates PP2A activation with theophylline as a method of controlling respiratory inflammation in human airway smooth muscle cells, in vitro (Patel et al., 2016).

== Cellular reaction pathways ==
=== PP1 pathway ===
Stimulation of mammalian cells with TNFα increases intracellular C6 ceramide production which then increases PP1 activity (Ghosh et al., 2007). It was previously thought that insulin was the primary stimulant of the PP1 pathway (Ghosh et al., 2007). It has now been shown that TNFα-mediated ceramide production increases the serine/threonine phosphatase activity of PP1 while insulin does not, indicating a ceramide-specific response (Ghosh et al., 2007). Inhibitors of de novo ceramide synthesis seem to prevent PP1 activation (Ghosh et al., 2007). The effects of ceramide on insulin-stimulated glycogen synthase kinase 3β phosphorylation were abolished with PP1 inhibitors, further implicating that TNFα mediates its effects through a ceramide-activated PP1 which blocks insulin phosphorylation cascades involved in glycogen metabolism (Ghosh et al., 2007).

=== PP2A pathway ===
The generation of ceramide can cause down-regulation of the c-myc gene, which can trigger a cellular cascade resulting in cell death through apoptotic mechanisms (Wolff et al., 1994). In leukemia cell lines, CAPP is actively brought into cells for downstream regulation of the c-myc gene through ceramide-induced control (Wolff et al., 1994). Partial purification of a ceramide-activated PP2A indicated an inherent ability to dephosphorylate the antiapoptotic protein c-jun in vitro, suggesting that it could be a direct substrate for ceramide-activated PP2A (Ruvolo et al., 1999).

Ceramide specifically activates a mitochondrial PP2A which results in the prompt dephosphorylation and inactivation of Bcl2 (Ruvolo et al., 1999). Bcl2 is an anti-apoptotic protein that, when inactivated, can cause the cell to conduct apoptosis (Ruvolo et al., 1999). Regulation of Bcl2 is dependent upon the phosphorylation status of Ser^{70} (Janssens & Goris, 2001). This phosphorylated residue is directly responsible for the apoptotic mechanism of the protein and a dephosphorylation at this site with a CAPP will inhibit its activity (Janssens and Goris, 2001).

Induction of apoptosis in Jurkat cells increases PP2A activity due to the activation of caspase-3, and the subsequent cleavage of the scaffold subunit which provided the enzyme with stability (Janssens & Goris, 2001). This increased activity can be observed with the decreased phosphorylation of MAPK pathway substrates (Janssens & Goris, 2001).

E4orf4, an adenovirus protein that has been shown to induce apoptosis in transformed cells, interacts with ceramide-activated PP2A to have this effect (Janssens & Goris, 2001). Interaction can take place on either a Bα or B' regulatory subunit but only interaction with a Bα subunit is sufficient for the induction of apoptosis in cells transformed with adenovirus (Janssens & Goris, 2001).

== Major pathological implications ==
=== Alzheimer’s disease ===
When tau proteins become hyperphosphorylated they dissociate from the microtubules to which they provide stability and are thought to polymerize into neurofibrillary tangles in the brain and contribute to the onset of Alzheimer's disease (Janssens & Goris, 2001). The B subunit of a CAPP confers the ability to dephosphorylate hyperphosphorylated tau proteins (Janssens & Goris, 2001). Hyperphosphorylated tau can interact with the acidic face of the B subunit and allow the catalytic subunit to dephosphorylate the protein (Janssens & Goris, 2001). Treatment of neuronal cells with okadaic acid has been shown to cause tau neurofibrillary tangles, indicating that disruptions of the interaction between CAPP, tau and microtubules can lead to the onset of Alzheimer’s disease (Janssens & Goris, 2001).

=== Cancer ===
CAPP was first linked to carcinogenesis when it was noticed that okadaic acid acted as a tumor promoter and it was postulated that its inhibition of CAPP may confer this property (Janssens & Goris, 2001). The α and β isoforms of the scaffold subunit of CAPP have been identified as tumor suppressor genes in skin, lung, breast and colon-derived cell lines (Janssens & Goris, 2001). The B' regulatory subunit of CAPP also appears to be overexpressed in melanoma, as compared to regular epidermal cells (Janssens & Goris, 2001).

The B' subunit seems to interact specifically with and dephosphorylate paxillin in the focal adhesions of cancer cells (Janssens & Goris, 2001). When truncated B' γ subunits were expressed in melanoma cells, an increased rate of metastasis was observed (Janssens & Goris, 2001). The increased cell migration appears to be related to the increased phosphorylation of paxillin when dysfunctional B' γ subunits are expressed (Janssens & Goris, 2001).

In most primary human malignancies telomerase is elevated, suggesting that telomerase is required for continuous cell division (Janssens & Goris, 2001). It has been shown that ceramide treatment can significantly reduce telomerase production in human lung carcinomas, indicating that CAPPs may be involved in counteracting uncontrolled cell growth (Ogretmen et al., 2001).
