= Center for Advanced Public Safety =

Research unit at the University of Alabama

- Type: Research Unit
- Established: Late 1980s
- Parent institution: University of Alabama
- Director: Dr. Laura Myers
- Location: Tuscaloosa, Alabama, United States
- Website: caps.ua.edu

The Center for Advanced Public Safety (CAPS) is part University of Alabama College of Engineering and specializes in advanced software research and development to assist traffic safety, law enforcement and homeland security.

== History ==
Formerly known as the CARE Research and Development Laboratory (CRDL), CAPS has its historical roots in information technology development to advance traffic safety. This originated with the Critical Analysis Reporting Environment (CARE) that was initially developed to assist moderate sized cities process their traffic crash records in the mid to late 1980s on CPM-based microcomputers. CARE has undergone continuous innovation over the years and is now in its tenth major version upgrade, while becoming a component of the enterprise traffic safety data system in 12 different states.

In 2017, CAPS was awarded approx. US $1.8m in funding by Governor Kay Ivey. The grants were administered through the Alabama Department of Economic and Community Affairs (ADECA).

== Projects ==
App Development: CAPS participated in the development of an app, HYPE, which helps people manage their blood pressure and is available, for free, to Apple and Android users.

Severe Weather Study: CAPS put out a call for volunteers to participate in a study “to see how people prepare and react to severe weather events.” Participants will be interviewed before, during, and after any “bad weather events during the 2021 Spring weather season.” The study is part of a federally-funded tornado study the University of Alabama is doing with the University of Oklahoma.
