= CAP code =

CAP code may refer to:

- Coded Anti-Piracy, an anti-copyright infringement technology for motion pictures
- CAP Code, a set of rules by the Committee of Advertising Practice
