= Aquaviva =

Aquaviva may refer to:

- Claudio Aquaviva, Italian Jesuit priest
- Aquaviva, Pannonia, ancient Roman settlement
- Aquaviva (titular see), medieval Catholic bishopric turned titular see
