= Calcyphosine =

Protein found in humans

An Error has occurred retrieving Wikidata item for infobox Calcyphosin is a protein that in humans is encoded by the CAPS gene.

== Function ==
This gene encodes a calcium-binding protein, which may play a role in the regulation of ion transport. A similar protein was first described as a potentially important regulatory protein in the dog thyroid and was termed as R2D5 antigen in rabbit. Alternative splicing of this gene generates two transcript variants.
