= Marian Palmer Capps =

American mathematician

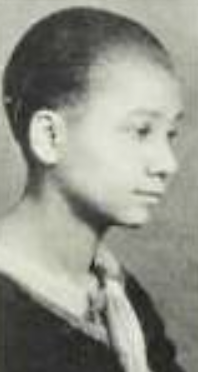
- Marian L. Palmer, from the 1927 yearbook of Howard University
- Born: 1901; Norfolk, Virginia
- Died: November 17, 2001 (aged 99–100)
- Occupations: Mathematician, college professor
- Known for: president of the Women's Auxiliary to the National Medical Association

Marian L. Palmer Capps (also known as Mrs John Winston Capps, 1901 – November 17, 2001) was an American mathematician who became a professor at Norfolk State University and president of the Women's Auxiliary to the National Medical Association.

== Education and career ==
Capps was African-American, originally from Norfolk, Virginia. After graduating from Booker T. Washington High School in Norfolk, she earned a bachelor's degree in mathematics from Howard University in 1927. Later, she earned a master's degree and Ph.D. in mathematics and mathematics education; sources differ on whether these graduate degrees were from Columbia University, the University of Wisconsin–Madison, or the Catholic University of America. In 1938, she married John Winston Capps, then teaching at Washington High School and later a Navy radiologist.

She became an instructor at the Hampton Institute, a historically black college in Hampton, Virginia, and eventually chaired the mathematics department there. In 1956, she was listed as a professor of education at the South Carolina State College. By 1959, she became a professor at Norfolk State University, where she taught for 25 years.

== Service ==
Capps served as president of the Women's Auxiliary to the National Medical Association for 1968–1969, setting a presidential theme of "Focusing on Problems of Dynamic Dimensions—Medical Careers, Mental Health, Sex Education". She led the Auxiliary in a boycott against the American Can Company for discrimination against African-Americans, and in joining an umbrella group of societies of African-American women.

She was appointed to the Virginia State Council of Higher Education in 1978, becoming the first African-American woman on the council. She also became the first African-American woman on the board of the Eastern Virginia Medical School.

She was active in the Delta Sigma Theta sorority, becoming in 1929 the founding president of what became the Norfolk Alumnae Chapter of the sorority and for many years afterward the national treasurer. She was also one of the first members of The Moles, a prominent African-American women's social group.

== Recognition ==
In 1959, Capps was named a Fellow of the American Association for the Advancement of Science.

The Urban League of Hampton Roads, a society devoted to African-American social and economic issues that Capps helped found, offers an annual award named for Capps for outstanding contributions to the league's causes through educational activities.
