= Francesco Cappè =

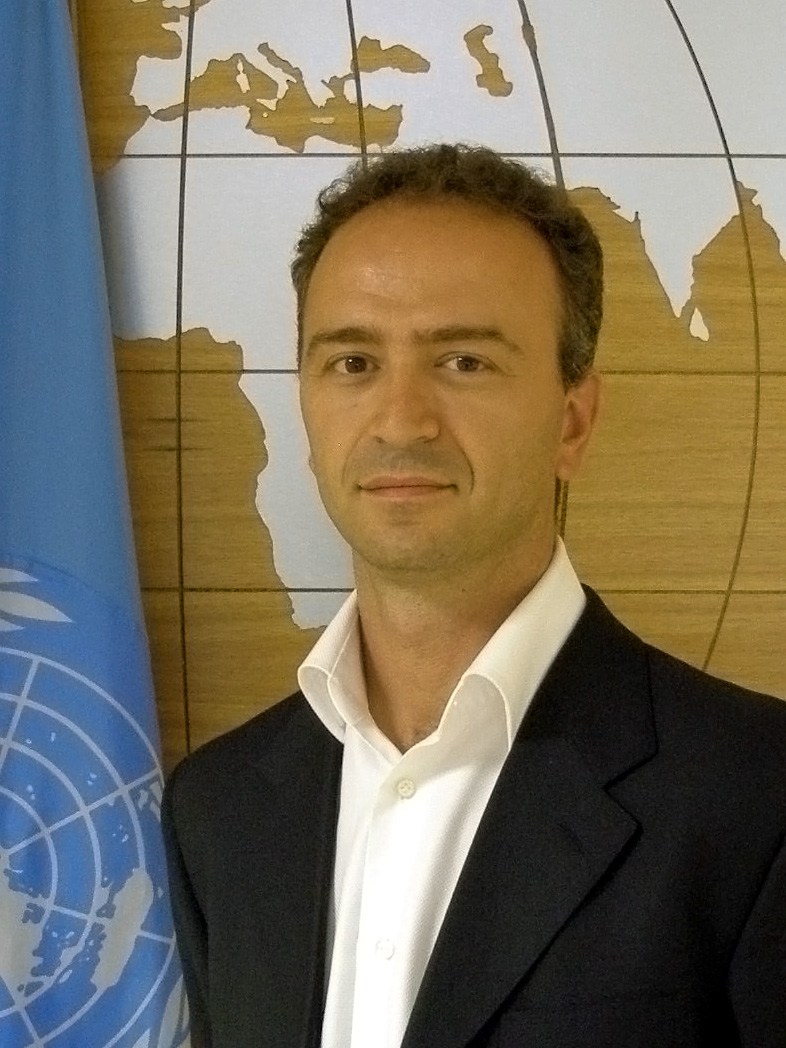
UN Official Francesco Cappè

Francesco Cappè (born 31 May 1971 in Fivizzano, Italy) is Chairman and founder of the garagErasmus Foundation and former United Nations official and Head, Security policies, Dialogue and Innovation for the United Nations Interregional Crime and Justice Research Institute (UNICRI); in this position he designed and supervised, among others, the first UN programme on security policies for major events and the UN initiatives against violent radicalization. He was a member of the UN Counter-Terrorism Implementation Task Force (CTITF) of the UN General Assembly. He also worked as Senior Advisor for the General Confederation of the Italian Industries (Confindustria) and Chair of the Robert F. Kennedy Flagship on Mediterranean Challenges as well as board member and CEO of international companies and Higher Education Institutions. He is currently CEO and Head of Institution of Gioya, a boutique Higher Education Institution with the main Hq in Malta. He is Chief Representatives in Europe for the Shanghai Arbitration Commission.

== Biography ==
Francesco Cappè was born in Fivizzano (MS, Italy) and he graduated in Law with a thesis on international law at the University of Pisa, Italy. After attending specialization courses in international relations at the European University Institute (Fiesole, Italy) and the University of Florence, he became an associate researcher at the University of Pisa and then Vice -Director of the Center for Human Rights University of Pisa. Since 2001, Cappè has been employed as UN staff by UNICRI (located in Turin, Italy) working in the field of security governance and anti-terrorism. In addition, he taught in seminars and courses in several universities, i.e. Johns Hopkins University, Scuola Superiore Sant'Anna, Pisa in its Washington D.C. campus. Cappè worked as Senior Advisor for the General Confederation of the Italian Industries (Confindustria) and Chair of the Robert F. Kennedy Flagship on Mediterranean Challenges as well as board member and CEO of international companies and Higher Education Institutions including Representative in Europe and visiting fellow of the Shanghai University of Political Science and Law.

== Publications ==
Cappè works as scientific director of the book series "Terrorism, Intelligence and Security" for Franco Angeli Edizioni, Milan, Italy. He participated in the publication of "Forum on crime and society", UNODC publication volume4, numer1-2, Dec. 2004, published in seven languages. He is Editor and co-author of "Generazione Erasmus: l'Italia dalle nuove idee" (Franco Angeli 2011)
