= Viviana Acquaviva =

Italian astrophysicist and climate scientist

- Born: 5 June 1979 (age 47)
- Education: University of Pisa; International School for Advanced Studies
- Scientific career
- Workplaces: New York City College of Technology; CUNY Graduate Center; Princeton University; Rutgers University
- Thesis: Perturbazioni cosmologiche al secondo ordine nello scenario inflazionario (2002)
- Website: Viviana Acquaviva

Viviana Acquaviva (born 5 June 1979) is an Italian scientist who is a professor in the Department of Physics at the New York City College of Technology, and in the Departments of Physics and Earth and Environmental Science at the CUNY Graduate Center. A former astrophysicist, her current research interests lie in applications of data science and machine learning to climate science. She was named one of Italy's most inspirational technologists in 2019.

== Early life and education ==
Acquaviva studied physics at the University of Pisa, where she studied second order cosmological perturbations for her master thesis under the supervision of Sabino Matarrese and Paolo Paolicchi. She then moved to the International School for Advanced Studies for her PhD. She was a postdoctoral researcher at Princeton University and Rutgers University. Her research looked at dark energy, modified models of gravity. She also trained in statistics and analysed cosmic microwave background data.

== Research and career ==
Acquaviva joined the faculty of City University of New York. Her research considers the development of computational tools to determine information about galaxy properties, including star formation history, the attenuation of dust and stellar mass. She created GalMC, a Markov chain Monte Carlo algorithm, that could be used to infer age, metallicity and star formation rate from spectral energy distribution (SED) fitting. She was part of the Cosmic Assembly Near-infrared Deep Extragalactic Legacy Survey (CANDELS). She has shown that machine learning models can be used to understand the relationship between galaxy spectra and the histories of their star formation.

In 2022, Acquaviva won a PIVOT fellowship from the Simons Foundation to work in the emerging field of climate data science. Her current research focuses on the present state of oceanic carbon cycle and determining how it will evolve in the future as a response to climate change.

Acquaviva seeks to improve diversity within the astrophysics and broader science community. She has led training programs for people from groups historically marginalized from astrophysics, including people in correctional facilities.

== Awards and honours ==
- 2017 Feliks Gross Award
- 2018 Italy 50 Most Influential Women in Tech
- 2020 Top 50 Women in Computer Science
- 2021 American Astronomical Society Harlow Shapley Visiting Lecturer
- 2021 "Tecnovisionarie" Italian Women in AI

== Selected publications ==
- Acquaviva, Viviana; Bartolo, Nicola; Matarrese, Sabino; Riotto, Antonio (2003). "Gauge-invariant second-order perturbations and non-Gaussianity from inflation". Nuclear Physics B. 667 (1–2): 119–148. arXiv:astro-ph/0209156. Bibcode:2003NuPhB.667..119A. doi:10.1016/s0550-3213(03)00550-9. Zbl 1038.83046. Wikidata Q60872164.
- J. Dunkley; Hložek, Renée; Sievers, Jonathan; et al. (2011). "The Atacama cosmology telescope: cosmological parameters from the 2008 power spectrum". The Astrophysical Journal. 739 (1): 52. arXiv:1009.0866. Bibcode:2011ApJ...739...52D. doi:10.1088/0004-637x/739/1/52. Wikidata Q58919278.
- Marriage, Tobias A.; Acquaviva, Viviana; Ade, P. Peter A. R.; et al. (2011). "The Atacama Cosmology Telescope: Sunyaev-Zel'dovich-selected galaxy clusters at 148 GHz in the 2008 survey". The Astrophysical Journal. 737 (2): 61. arXiv:1010.1065. Bibcode:2011ApJ...737...61M. doi:10.1088/0004-637x/737/2/61. Wikidata Q58919272.
