= Mount Capps =

Mountain in Alaska, United States

- Location within Alaska

Highest point
- Elevation: 10,551 ft (3,216 m)
- Prominence: 340 ft (100 m)
- Coordinates: 63°04′47″N 151°11′07″W

Geography
- Location: Denali Borough, Alaska, United States
- Parent range: Alaska Range
- Topo map: USGS Mount McKinley A-3

Climbing
- Easiest route: From Kahiltna Pass

Mount Capps is a 10,551-foot (3,216 m) mountain in the Alaska Range, in Denali National Park and Preserve, southwest of Denali on a ridge between Denali and Mount Crosson, close to Kahiltna Dome and at the heads of Peters Glacier and Kahiltna Glacier. Mount Capps was named in 1952 by after U.S. Geological Survey geologist Stephen Reid Capps.

== See also ==
- Mountain peaks of Alaska
