= Cap Radio (Morocco) =

Radio station in Tangier, Morocco

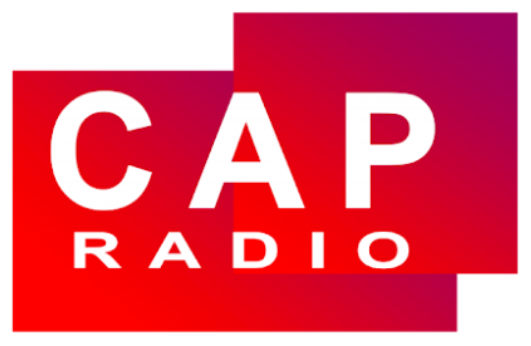

Tangier; Morocco
- Broadcast area: Tangier-Tetouan-Al Hoceima, Morocco

Programming
- Languages: Moroccan Arabic; Tarifit; Arabic; Spanish; French
- Format: Full-service radio
- Affiliations: Authenticity and Modernity Party

Ownership
- Owner: Abdelmajid Laaroussi
- Operator: Société Cap Radio

History
- Founded: 2006
- First air date: January 1, 2007

Technical information
- Licensing authority: High Authority for Audiovisual Communication (HACA)

Links
- Website: https://capradio.ma

Cap Radio is a private Moroccan radio station based in Tangier. It covers the audience basins of the Rif geographical region and nearby regions of Morocco. The regions of Casablanca-Settat and Marrakesh-Safi broadcast its news items and programs in Moroccan Arabic, especially from the north and the Rif dialect, to the Southern Provinces.

== Information ==
According to the specifications of the radio approved by the high audiovisual authority, Cap radio focuses on events, news and culture from the north and the Rif in order to create a connection between this region and the rest of Morocco. That is to say, to broadcast all that concerns the north of Morocco and the Rif region, either at the level of lifestyle, culture or current events, close to listeners from the rest of Morocco so that they can fully understand the particularity and richness that distinguishes this region.

Cap radio is among the first radios which had the authorization of the HACA as a private radio in Morocco after the liberation of the audiovisual sector and the cancellation of the monopoly of the sector by the state, which remained since independence.

Cap radio was authorized in 2006 and began broadcasting its programs in January 2007 with an approach that marked a change at the audiovisual level in Morocco based on the concept of proximity: It makes radio close to the public and not continues on the way of a black box i.e. the public listens to the radio but they never saw a journalist among them; all they know from the radios are the voices of a few people and their names. Cap Radio did not use this approach; the public has become the first partner of the radio and not a client. This approach has been achieved by three techniques:

The radio is broadcast in Moroccan Darija and the Rif dialect, but in fact it was not an obligation but a choice because before Cap Radio, the state radios only used Arabic or French. The radio at this time was a means of communication with the elite, and in addition, the target audience only had the right to receive and not to participate.

Cap radio radically changed this rule by using the linguistic tool used by everyone, which gave the opportunity to the listener to be a participant and a partner and to make this feasible, the radio chose to base itself on the second technique, which was live and interactive.

Cap Radio, since the beginning, has chosen to broadcast its programs live in Darija and Rifian by opening the telephone lines for listeners, and in addition to that, inviting listeners and not experts to these studios.

The third technique applied by Cap Radio was the presence of its microphone at the scene of the events, either by these journalists located in Tangier or their correspondents located in other cities in the North and in Rif. This contributed to the radio achieving its main objective, which is making the listener a participant. This approach has changed the concept of radio in the north and in Rif and has made Cap Radio the first radio in this region at the audience level, an approach that was no longer accepted before, but currently all the radios in Morocco exercise it, even the great classic radios.

The radio station programs are emitted in both Rifian Berber and Moroccan Arabic. The founding of the station required an investment of 6 million Moroccan dirhams.

== See also ==
- Communications in Morocco
