= Consolidated Appeals Process =

The Consolidated Appeals Process (CAP) is an advocacy tool for humanitarian financing, in which projects managed by the United Nations, NGOs and other stakeholders come together to approach the donor community funding international development activities. The target of the CAP is long-term development, whereas the Central Emergency Response Fund (CERF), started in 2006, targets sudden onset humanitarian crisis such as natural disasters. The 2011 CAP seeks US$7.4 billion to help 50 million people in 28 countries. The 2006 CAP was covered by the donor community to 63%.

== Structure ==
As of 2006 the CAP is divided into ‘clusters’, representing the various groups of implementing agencies in humanitarian aid. The humanitarian principles drive the formulation of the CAP. The humanitarian need on the ground is assessed by the stakeholders, to ensure that appeals’ funding requests are grounded in solid evidence.

== 2006 CAP ==
In 2006 the United Nations and its partner humanitarian agencies fed 97 million people in 82 countries, including 6.5 million people in the Sudan; vaccinated over 30 million children against measles in emergency situations, including 51% of the under-five children in the Central African Republic; supported hundreds of emergency health facilities, including 210 health centres in Burundi; created hundreds of emergency education facilities; supplied safe drinking water to millions of crisis-affected people, for example 214 new boreholes drilled for displaced people’s camps in Uganda; provided protection and assistance to some 20 million refugees and displaced persons; and supported child protection activities in some 150 countries.

In August 2007 the UN, under the leadership of acting Humanitarian Coordinator for the Sudan David Gressly, launched a flash appeal for the response to the 2007 Sudan floods for just over US$20 million.

== 2007 CAP ==
As of January 2008, the Appeal for Chad appears to be the best-funded worldwide, at 97%

== 2009 CAP ==
See link below for the Humanitarian Appeal 2009

== See also ==
- Office for the Coordination of Humanitarian Affairs
- European Community Humanitarian aid Office
