= Computer-aided process planning =

Manufacturing process

Manufacturing Process planning is the systematic determination of the best way to manufacture a product or component, which involves choosing the appropriate materials, methods, and the most efficient sequence of steps. Its primary goal is to optimize the production process, ensuring it is both cost-effective and capable of delivering high-quality results. In essence, it translates an engineering drawing or 3D model into a detailed group of manufacturing steps, often resulting in specific documents (routing sheets, tooling lists, operation lists, work instructions, etc.) that outlines the sequence of operations and the specific machines required.

While process planning has traditionally been a manual, knowledge-intensive task performed by experienced engineers, many advanced companies now utilize Computer-Aided Process Planning (CAPP). CAPP refers to the use of advanced computer software to assist process planners in generating manufacturing plans. It serves as a bridge between product design and manufacturing, automating tasks that were traditionally performed manually by experienced engineers. CAPP systems are particularly advantageous for large companies with a high variety of complex product geometries, as they help save money, reduce lead times, and create more efficient process plans.

The main advantages of CAPP include:

1. Automation and Efficiency: It significantly decreases the time and effort required to generate plans, making the process less dependent on the individual expertise of a planner.
2. Optimization: The software uses algorithms to identify plans that minimize production time and costs while maintaining quality.
3. Flexibility: CAPP systems can quickly adapt process plans to reflect changes in product designs or manufacturing requirements.

There are two primary approaches to CAPP: the Variant Approach and the Generative Approach.

== Variant Approach (Retrieval Method). ==
The variant approach functions by retrieving a standard manufacturing plan from a database and adapting it to fit a specific new part. It relies heavily on Group Technology (GT) and coding systems (such as the Opitz system) to classify parts into "families" based on similar geometric and manufacturing characteristics. The method operates through two distinct operational stages:

1. Preparatory Stage: Parts are classified into families, and standard process planning templates are created for each group based on shared machining operations, tooling requirements, and production methods.
2. Production Stage: When a new component is introduced, it is coded and classified so the system can identify its family and retrieve the corresponding template. The system then customizes that template to account for the unique features or tolerances of the individual part.

A primary benefit of the variant approach is that it is easier to comprehend and gives the process planner more control over the final plan. However, its main limitation is that it is restricted to planning components that are very similar to those already existing in the system's database.

== Generative Approach. ==
The generative approach involves creating a unique manufacturing plan from scratch for each new component. Unlike the variant method, it does not rely on retrieving and modifying existing plans for similar parts; instead, it combines product and process data to automatically construct a fresh strategy. A generative CAPP system typically consists of a part-based system (to interpret geometry and tolerances), a manufacturing database (listing available machinery and their capabilities), a sequencing subsystem (the "logic" core), and a report generator. This system employs algorithms to identify a part's geometric features and propose the most suitable manufacturing operations and sequences based on knowledge-focused reasoning and heuristics. It often utilizes sophisticated techniques such as expert systems (rule-based reasoning), machine learning, deep learning, and constraint programming to optimize the plan and ensure it satisfies manufacturing requirements.

== Past experiences ==
Generative or dynamic CAPP is the main focus of development, which is the ability to automatically generate production plans for new products, or dynamically update production plans based on resource availability. Generative CAPP may use iterative methods, where simple production plans are applied to automatic CAD/CAM development to refine the initial production plan.

A Generative CAPP system was developed at Beijing No. 1 Machine Tool Plant (BYJC) in Beijing, China as part of a UNDP project (DG/CRP/87/027) from 1989 to 1995. The project was reported in "Machine Design Magazine; New Trends" May 9, 1994, P.22-23. The system was demonstrated to the CASA/SME Leadership in Excellence for Applications Development (LEAD) Award committee in July 1995. The committee awarded BYJC the LEAD Award in 1995 for this achievement. In order to accomplish Generative CAPP, modifications were made to the CAD, PDM, ERP, and CAM systems. In addition, a Manufacturing Execution System (MES) was built to handle the scheduling of tools, personnel, supply, and logistics, as well as maintain shop floor production capabilities.

Generative CAPP systems are built on a factory's production capabilities and capacities. In Discrete Manufacturing, Art-to-Part validations have been performed often, but when considering highly volatile engineering designs, and multiple manufacturing operations with multiple tooling options, the decision tables become longer and the vector matrices more complex. BYJC builds CNC machine tools and Flexible Manufacturing Systems (FMS) to customer specifications. Few are duplicates. The Generative CAPP System is based on the unique capabilities and capacities needed to produce those specific products at BYJC. Unlike a Variant Process Planning system that modifies existing plans, each process plan could be defined automatically, independent of past routings. As improvements are made to production efficiencies, the improvements are automatically incorporated into the current production mix. This generative system is a key component of the CAPP system for the Agile Manufacturing environment.

In order to achieve the Generative CAPP system, components were built to meet needed capabilities:

1. Shop floor manufacturing abilities of BYJC were defined. It was determined that there are 46 major operations and 84 dependent operations the shop floor could execute to produce the product mix. These operations are manufacturing primitive operations. As new manufacturing capabilities are incorporated into the factory's repertoire, they need to be accommodated in the spectrum of operations.
2. These factory operations are then used to define the features for the Feature Based Design extensions that are incorporated into the CAD system.
3. The combination of these feature extensions and the parametric data associated with them became part of the data that is passed from the CAD system to the modified PDM system as the data set content for the specific product, assembly, or part.
4. The ERP system was modified to handle the manufacturing abilities for each tool on the shop floor. This is an extension to the normal feeds and speeds that the ERP system has the capability of maintaining about each tool. In addition, personnel records are also enhanced to note special characteristics, talents, and education of each employee should it become relevant in the manufacturing process.
5. A Manufacturing Execution System (MES) was created. The MES's major component is an expert/artificial intelligent system that matches the engineering feature objects from the PDM system against the tooling, personnel, material, transportation needs, etc. needed to manufacture them in the ERP system. Once physical components are identified, the items are scheduled. The scheduling is continuously updated based on the real time conditions of the enterprise. Ultimately, the parameters for this system were based on expenditures, time, physical dimensions, availability.

The parameters are used to produce multidimensional differential equations. Solving the partial differential equations will produce the optimum process and production planning at the time when the solution was generated. Solutions had the flexibility to change over time based on the ability to satisfy agile manufacturing criteria. Execution planning can be dynamic and accommodate changing conditions.

The system allows new products to be brought on line quickly based on their manufacturability. The more sophisticated CAD/CAM, PDM and ERP systems have the base work already incorporated into them for Generative Computer Aided Process Planning. The task of building and implementing the MES system still requires identifying the capabilities that exist within a given establishment, and exploiting them to the fullest potential. The system created is highly specific, the concepts can be extrapolated to other enterprises.

== See also ==
- CAD, (computer-aided design)
- CAM, (computer-aided manufacturing)
- CIM, (computer-integrated manufacturing)
