= Pietro Francavilla =

French sculptor

- Born: 1548; Cambrai, Kingdom of France
- Died: 25 August 1612
- Occupation: Sculptor

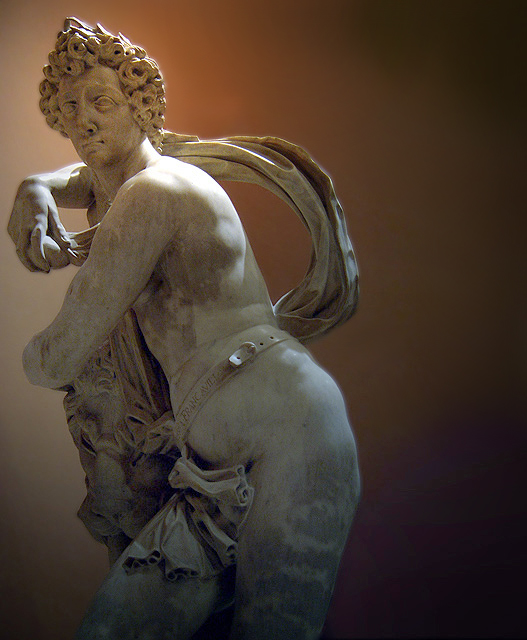
David conqueror of Goliath, 1608 (Louvre Museum)

Pierre Francqueville, generally called Pietro Francavilla (1548 — 25 August 1615), was a Franco-Flemish sculptor trained in Florence, who provided sculpture for Italian and French patrons in the elegant Late Mannerist tradition established by Giambologna.

== Biography ==
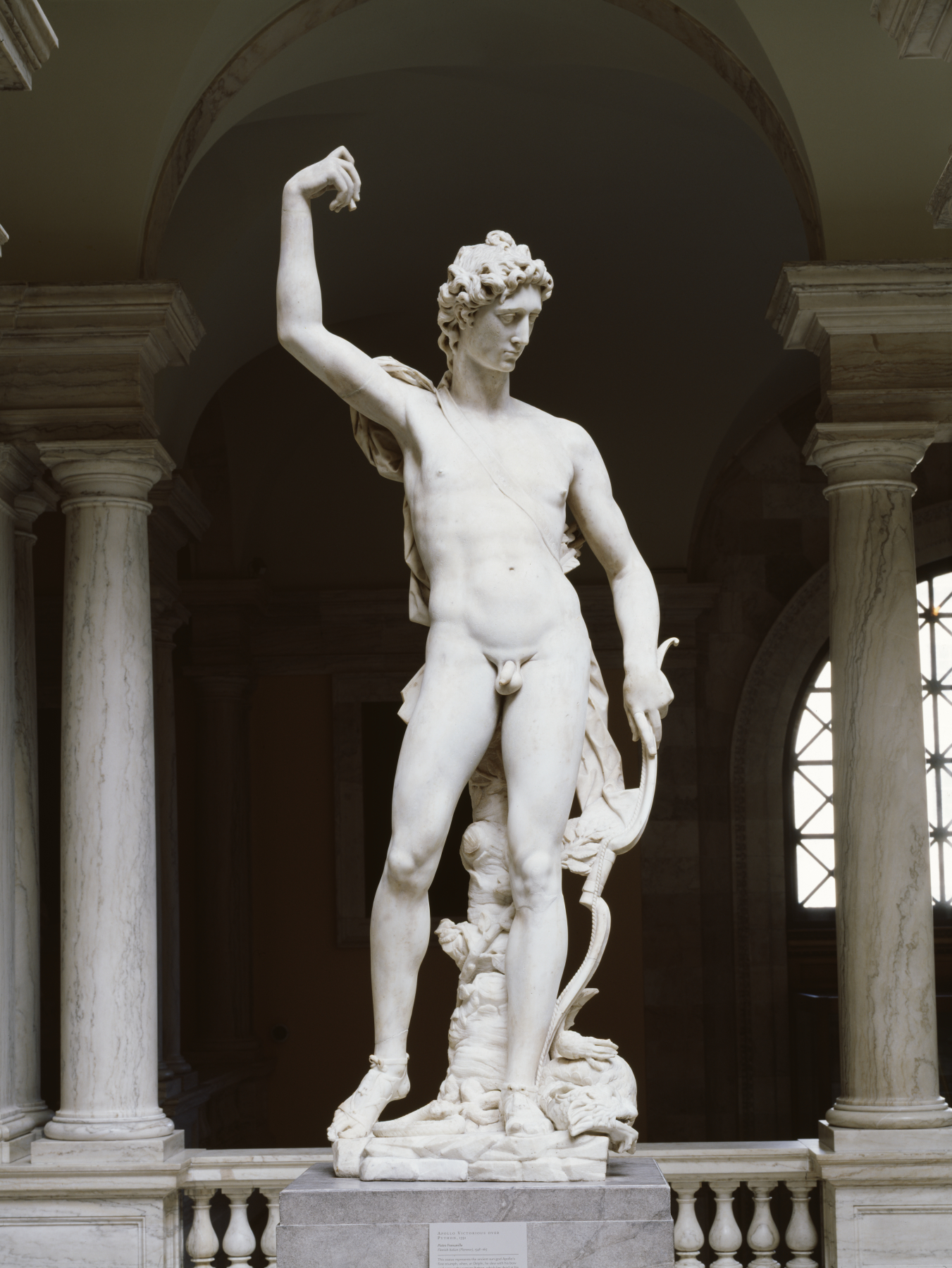
Sculpture by Francavlla depicting Apollo's first triumph, when he slew with his bow and arrows the serpent Python (1591). The Walters Art Museum.

Born at Cambrai, he received his early training as a draftsman in Paris. In 1565 he is recorded at Innsbruck, where Alexander Colin was working on the elaborate monument in the Hofkirche for the funerary monument to Emperor Maximilian I. In this project Francqueville learned enough of the practice of sculpture to enter the large Florentine atelier of his fellow countryman, Giambologna. Francavilla became his master's main assistant in the carving of marble, including the masterpiece of the Rape of the Sabines displayed in the Loggia dei Lanzi, Florence. His first independent commissions were extended to him through Giambologna, who become overwhelmed with requests. Francavilla's finished pen-and-ink drawings after the master's bozzetti for projects, as they were stored at the workshop, are in some cases the only testament to works that have been lost or that were never executed.

In 1574, he began his first independent commission, eventually constituting thirteen garden sculptures for abbate Antonio di Zanobi Bracci for the Villa Bracci at Rovezzano near Florence. The thirteen were purchased through Sir Horace Mann, British envoy at Florence, for Frederick, Prince of Wales, who died without ever seeing them; they were left in storage at Kew and have been dispersed and ignored, then rediscovered in 1952. A late example in the series, the Venus at the Wadsworth Atheneum, Hartford, is signed and dated 1600, and must have been made for or acquired by Bracci's nephew, who inherited the estate in 1585.

In 1585 Francavilla was elected to the Florentine Academy.

In 1589 nearly all artists in Florence were recruited for the unprecedented decorations set up to celebrate the wedding of Ferdinando I de' Medici and Christina of Lorraine, including painted triumphal arches along the procession route. For the event, a temporary façade, designed by Giovanni Antonio Dosio, was erected for the Duomo; Francavilla provided sculptures of Saints Zenobius and Poggio.

In 1590 he executed the sculpture of Spring to be erected at Bartolomeo Ammannati's Ponte Santa Trinita, Florence.

In 1598 he executed an Orpheus with Cerberus for the banker Jerome (Girolamo) de Gondi, gentleman of the King's bedchamber, whose Florentine family had emigrated to France in the train of Catherine de' Medici. Gondi placed it in a central fountain in the garden of his Paris hôtel in the suburban Faubourg Saint-Germain, where it was much admired. It eventually found its way to the gardens of Versailles. Gondi's Château de Saint-Cloud was later purchased for Philippe I, Duke of Orléans, brother of Louis XIV. The sculpture is now in the Louvre Museum.

He intervened, probably only with drawings, in the new architectural façade provided for the Palazzo dei Priori, Pisa; the Gothic structure was unified under a scheme commenced by Giorgio Vasari to create a Medicean focus in Pisa. In the renamed Piazza dei Cavalieri, Francavilla's monumental statue of Cosimo I reigned over the former Palazzo degli Anziani ("Palace of the Elders"), a former symbol of Pisan independence remade as a Medicean monument.

He was invited to France by Henri IV in 1601, when Pietro Tacca took his place as Giambologna's premier assistant.

When Marie de' Medici, the Florentine-born queen of France, decided to erect an equestrian statue in honor of her husband, Henry IV, she awarded the commission to Giambologna, who had executed monuments to the grand dukes of Tuscany, Cosimo and Ferdinand I (at Arezzo) Following Giambologna's death (1608), the casting and finishing was executed by his pupil Pietro Tacca. When the bronze arrived in Paris, the queen commissioned a pedestal from Pierre Francqueville, as he was known in France. He modelled three bas-reliefs for the base to be cast in bronze and modeled four bound captives before his death. His pupil and son-in-law, Francesco Bordoni, who had followed Francavilla to France, cast and finished the bronzes, which were completed in 1618.

Francavilla died in 1615. His portrait, executed in chalk, by Hendrik Goltzius in 1591, is in the Rijksmuseum.

== Major works ==
- Garden sculptures for Villa Bracci, Rovezzano (1574)
- Amorino (c. 1580), a joint work with Giambologna.
- Jason (late 1580s), marble, Museo del Bargello, Florence
- Spring (1590), marble sculpture for the Ponte S. Trinita, Florence.
- Ferdinand I de' Medici (1595), Arezzo. Executed to a design by Giambologna.
- Cosimo I (1596), Pisa; the Grand Duke is in the robes of Grand Master of his Ordine dei Cavalieri di Santo Stefano, erected in Piazza dei Cavalieri, Pisa, as a civic symbol of the hegemony of Florence.
- Orpheus (1598), marble, for the Hôtel de Gondi, Paris (Louvre Museum).
- Four bound Captives (1614) from the base of the equestrian statue of Henry IV of France, erected in 1635 on the Pont-Neuf, Paris, cast and finished by his son-in-law Francesco Bordoni, 1618; they were stored through the Napoleonic Empire, and have been in the Louvre Museum since 1817.
- David, conqueror of Goliath, (1608) marble (Louvre Museum).
- Mercury
- Venus 1600, marble (Wadsworth Atheneum, Hartford, Connecticut)
- Meleager
- Bust of Saint Romualdo
