= Palazzo del Collegio Puteano =

Coordinates: 43°43′9.55″N 10°23′58.01″E

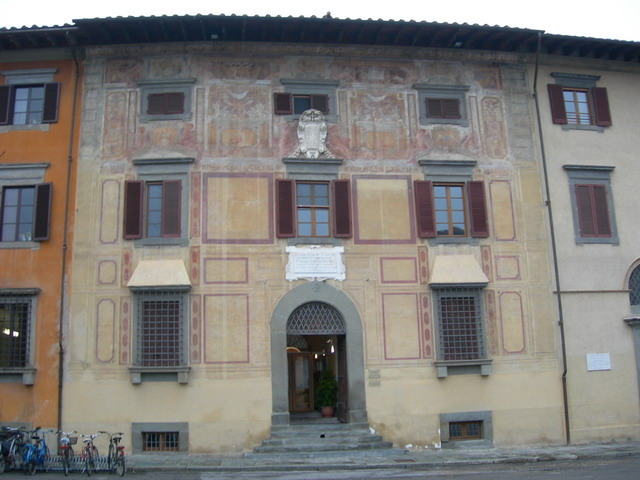
Palazzo del Collegio Puteano

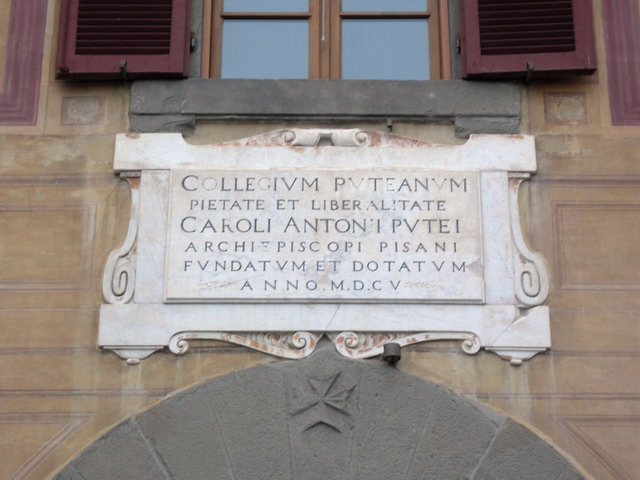
Sign on the façade

The Palazzo del Collegio Puteano (Palace of the Putean College) is a building in Piazza dei Cavalieri in Pisa, Italy. The palace occupies the whole western part of the square and makes a corner with Via Corsica street.

The palace, located near to the Church of St Rocco, was built in the present form between 1549 and 1598, by joining a group of three previous houses.

In 1605, it was given in perpetual rent to the Knights of St Stephen, to host some students from Piedmont, by order of Archbishop Carlo Antonio Dal Pozzo, from whom the name Puteano is derived.

Between 1608 and 1609 the façade was decorated with allegoric frescoes by Giovanni Stefano Marucelli. After the suppression of the Knights, the college was closed in 1925, but it opened again in 1930 when the Scuola Normale Superiore di Pisa used the building as Home of the Student of the university. In 1969, the palace underwent a major restoration, and currently belongs to Scuola Normale and hosts the research center of mathematics and the guesthouse.
