= Statue of Cosimo I =

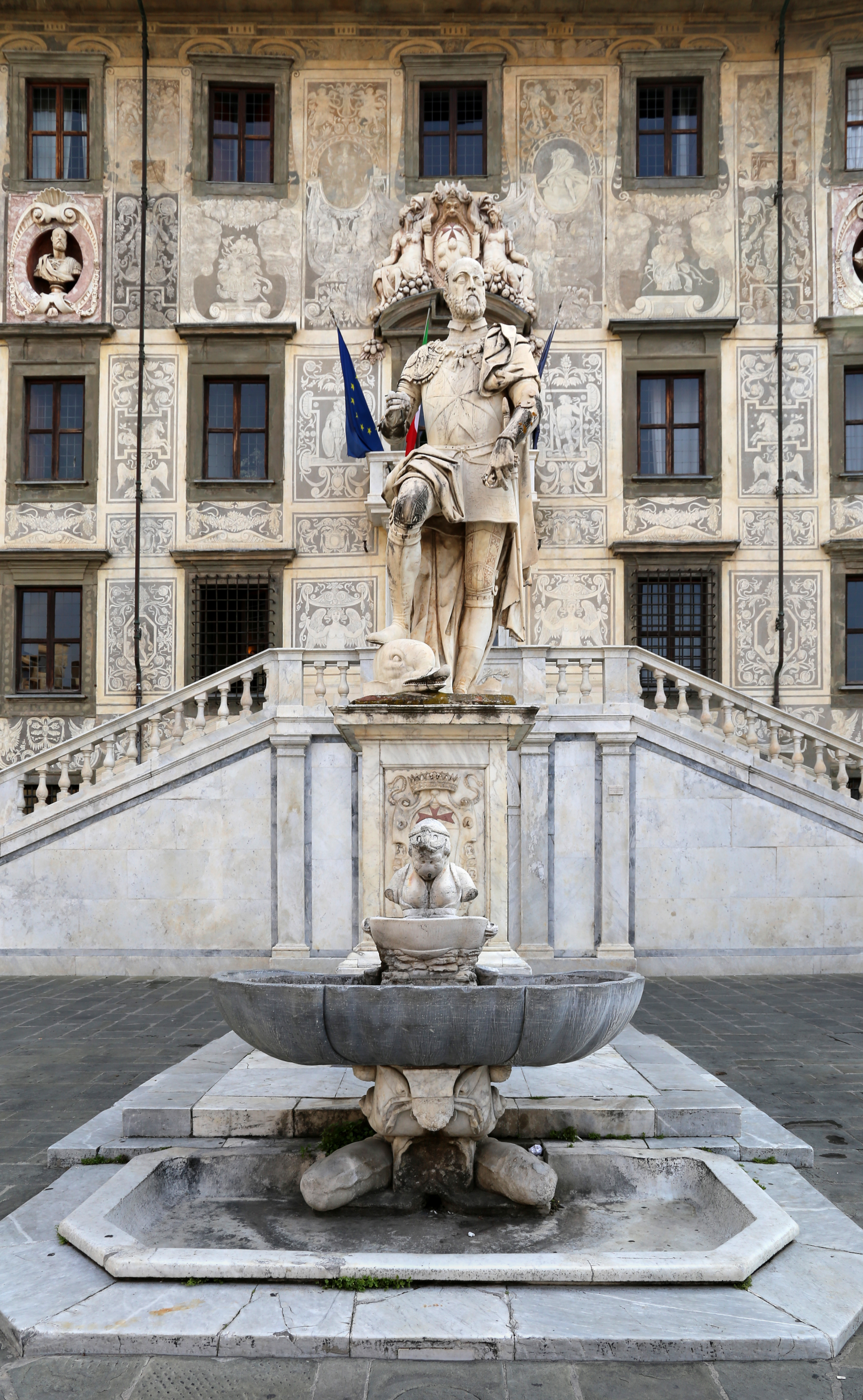
- Statue of Cosimo I in Knights' Square

- Location within Tuscany
- Artist: Pietro Francavilla
- Year: 1596
- Movement: Late Mannerist
- Subject: Cosimo I de' Medici
- Location: Knights' Square, Pisa; 43°43′10.20″N 10°24′00.57″E

The Statue of Cosimo I is a bronze statue of Cosimo I de' Medici located in the middle of Knights' Square of Pisa, just in front of Palazzo della Carovana.

The Grand Duke Cosimo is represented in the robes of Grand Master, standing on a high pedestal, in the act of subduing a dolphin, symbol of his domination over the seas. The fountain, in front of the pedestal, was also erected by Francavilla. It has a basin in the form of a shell decorated with two grotesque monsters.

== History ==
It was commissioned by Grand Duke Ferdinando I in 1596 to the Franco-Flemish sculptor Pietro Francavilla, who executed it in the elegant Late Mannerist tradition. The statue celebrates Ferdinando's father as the first Grand Master of the Order of the Knights of St. Stephen and is a civic symbol of the hegemony of Florence.

== Gallery ==
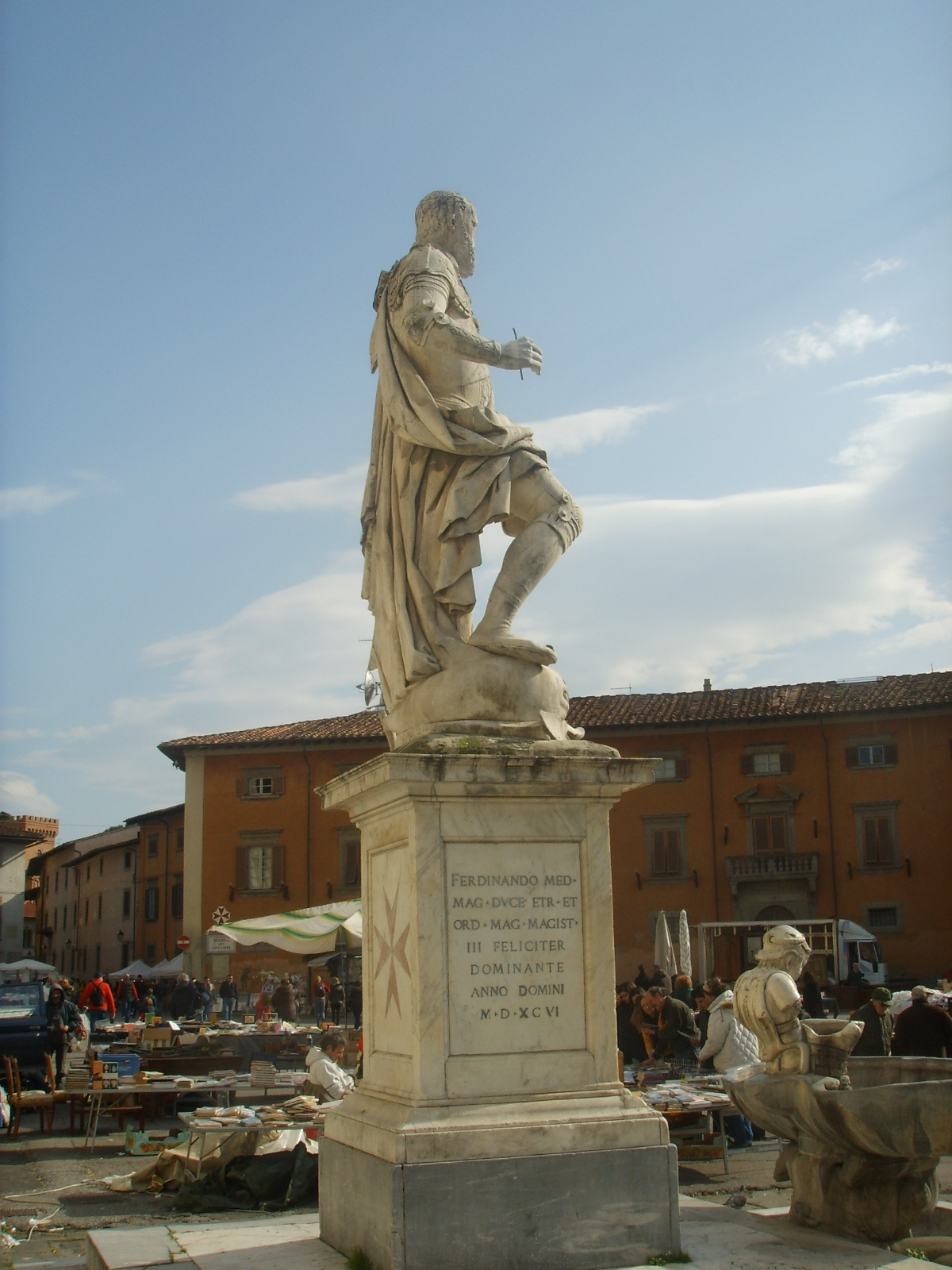
Statue

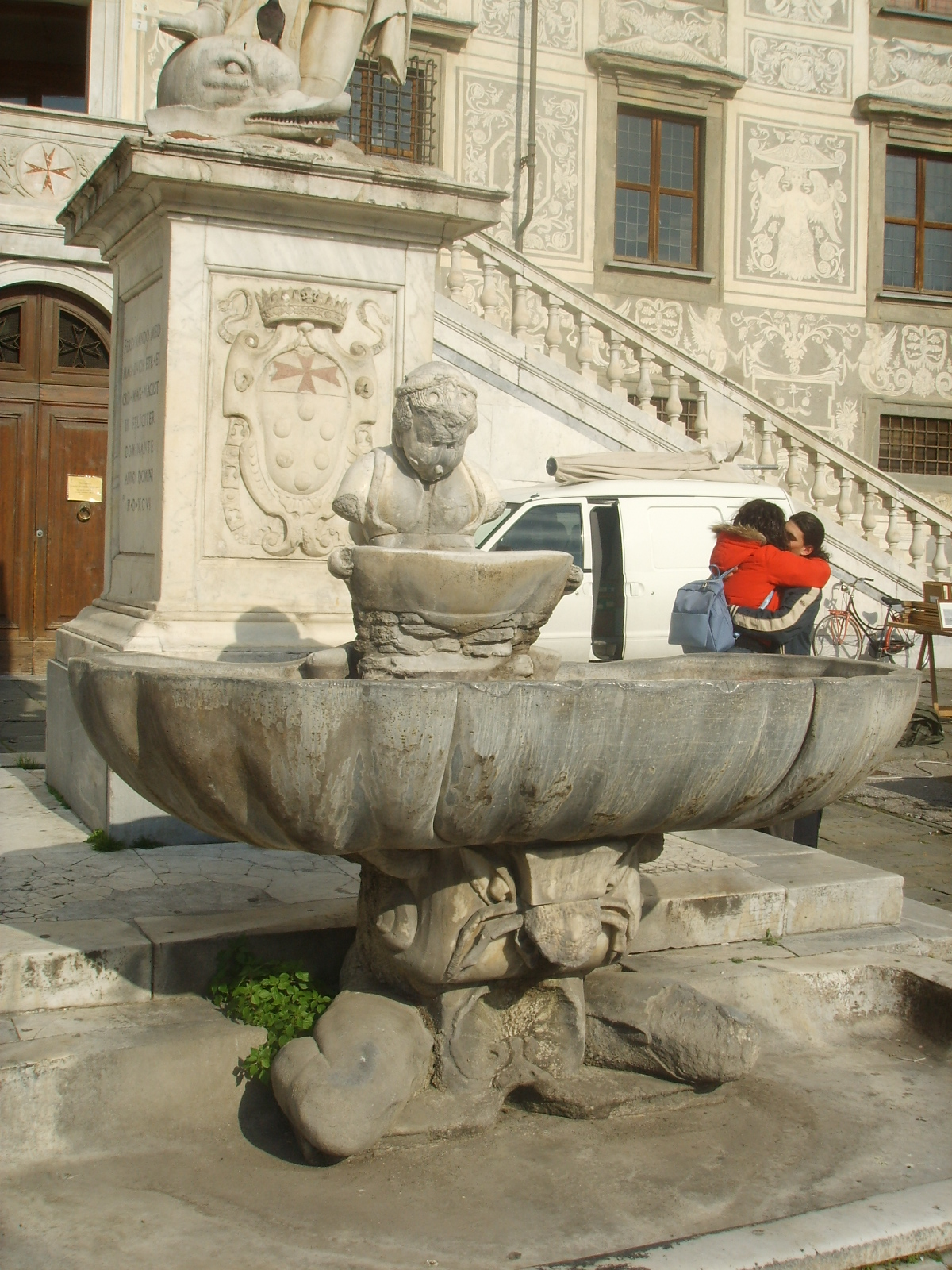
Fountain

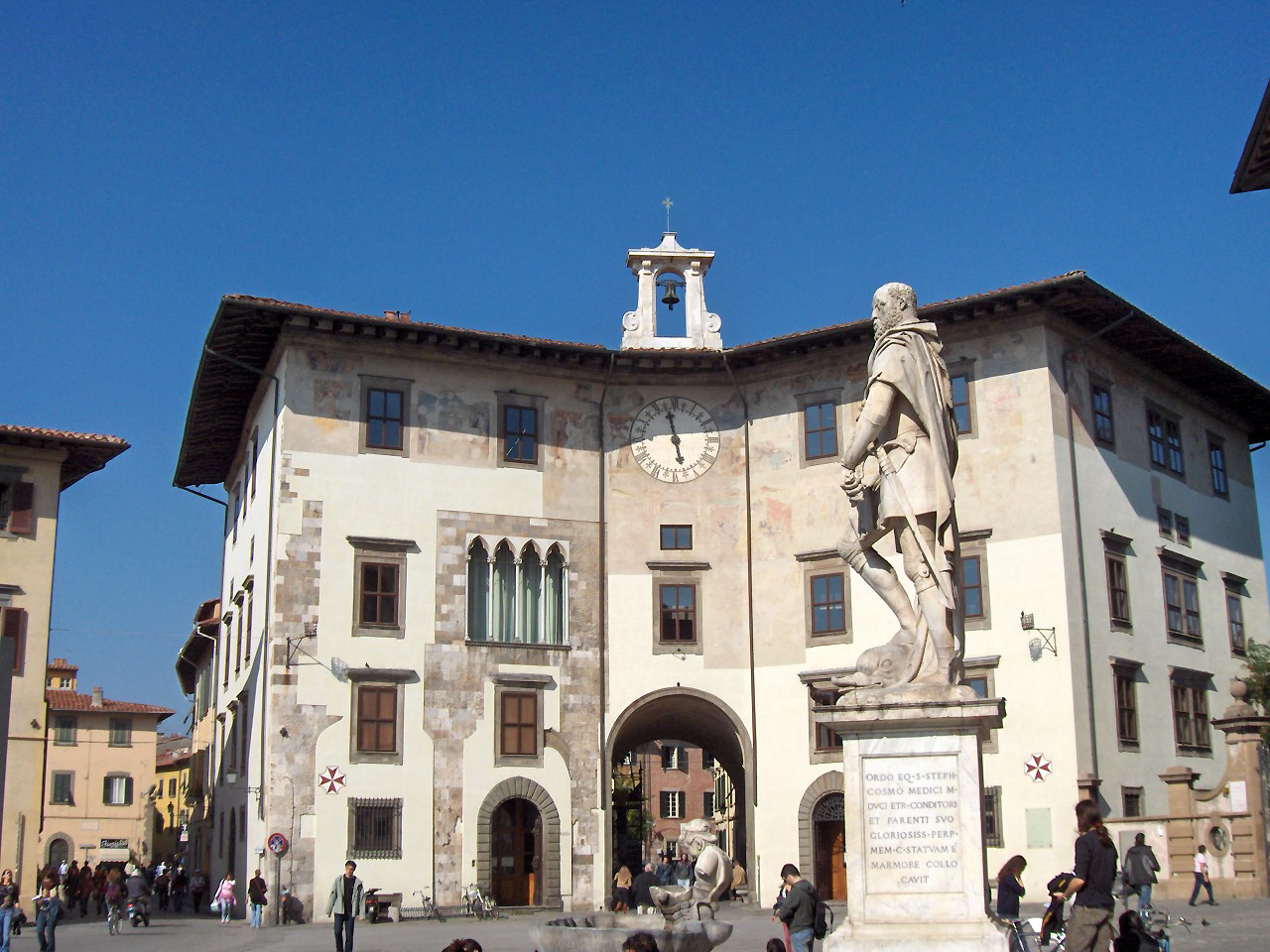
With Palazzo dell'Orologio
