= Giovanni Bandini =

- Giovanni Bandini, Bust of Cosimo I de' Medici, c. 1572, Detroit Institute of Arts
- Born: 1540; Castello, near Florence, Duchy of Florence
- Died: 18 April 1599 (aged 58–59); Florence, Grand Duchy of Tuscany
- Other name: Giovanni dell'Opera
- Education: Baccio Bandinelli
- Known for: Sculpture
- Movement: Mannerism

Giovanni Bandini (also called Giovanni dell'Opera; 1540 – 18 April 1599) was an Italian Mannerist sculptor.

== Biography ==
Giovanni Bandini was born in Castello, near Florence in 1540. He was a pupil of Baccio Bandinelli and, following his master's death in 1560, he completed the choir-screen of Florence Cathedral, a project begun by Bandinelli in 1547. Bandini continued to work for the cathedral after completing the choir-screen. Between 1576 and 1577, he produced two column statues of the apostles St. James the Lesser and St. Philip, which were placed in niches within the piers supporting the dome. Having spent twenty years working in a workshop belonging to the Opera del Duomo (the cathedral's board of works), he was given the nickname Giovanni dell'Opera, by which he was known for the rest of his life. In 1563, he became a member of the newly established Accademia delle Arti del Disegno, and the following year, he was commissioned by the academy to create temporary personifications of Architecture and the Tiber for Michelangelo's funeral catafalque.

Cosimo I de' Medici was so impressed by Bandini's work for the funeral that he commissioned him to carve the permanent marble personification of Architecture for the final tomb. Bandini's Allegory of Architecture, completed in 1574, is considered one of his finest achievements. It sits on the right side of the sarcophagus, flanking the central bust of Michelangelo alongside Giovanni Battista Lorenzi’s Allegory of Painting and Valerio Cioli’s Allegory of Sculpture. A preparatory terracotta sketch-model for the statue is held in the Sir John Soane's Museum in London. Around the same time, in 1573, Bandini produced another successful work: a bronze Juno for the studiolo (private cabinet) of Francesco I de' Medici in the Palazzo Vecchio. This piece closely aligns with the aesthetic of small-scale bronzes favoured by his master, Bandinelli. Of particular interest are the two reliefs he created for the Gaddi Chapel in Santa Maria Novella: the Visitation, with its symmetrical simplicity of composition drawing upon the examples of Fra Bartolomeo and Andrea del Sarto, and the Presentation at the Temple, in which the main scene is set in the background. This spatial and atmospheric device reflects the influence of contemporary painting and would be developed further in Florentine sculpture throughout the late 16th and 17th centuries.

In Florence, Bandini was primarily known as a portrait sculptor. He imbued the classicism he had learned from Bandinelli with a clarity and simplicity of style that made his portraits highly effective and gave them a formal, official air. Notable examples include the bust of Cosimo, placed above the exterior doorway of the Opera del Duomo in 1572; the bust of Francesco, positioned above a doorway at the Zecca Vecchia (Old Mint) in 1577; and the idealised bust of Brunelleschi, housed in the Museo dell'Opera del Duomo. The formal simplicity of Bandini’s work has an "archaizing" quality, setting him apart from both Michelangelo and the doctrinaire classicism of Baccio Bandinelli. However, like all sixteenth-century sculptors, he could not escape Michelangelo's influence. His stucco statue of St. Peter in the Painters' Chapel of the Santissima Annunziata emulates the statue of Giuliano de' Medici realized by Michelangelo for the New Sacristy of the Basilica of San Lorenzo.

Despite the esteem he earned in Florence, particularly as a portraitist, Bandini faced many struggles within the local artistic milieu, largely due to Giambologna's overwhelming renown. He also contended with severe financial hardship. Consequently, he readily accepted an invitation from Francesco Maria II della Rovere to move to Urbino in 1582 – an arrangement facilitated by Simone Fortuna, a trusted agent of the duke. Bandini was preferred to Giambologna, perhaps because the latter was already heavily committed to projects in Florence. It was in Urbino that the artist produced his finest work, enjoying greater independence from Bandinelli's style.

Bandini's Pietà (1583–86) in the Oratorio della Grotta, Urbino Cathedral

Many sculptures from this period have been lost, but surviving works include a bust of Francesco Maria I (1582–83; Florence, Museo Nazionale del Bargello), a bust of Francesco Maria II (Florence, Villa di Poggio Imperiale) and a statue of Francesco Maria I (1587), created for the Villa Imperiale of Pesaro and later gifted to the Republic of Venice in 1624 (it is now in the courtyard of the Doge's Palace in Venice). Also dating from this period is Bandini's masterpiece, the Pietà (1583–86), which was likely intended for the duke's tomb in the Oratorio della Grotta in Urbino Cathedral. The works betrays the influence of Sebastiano del Piombo's Pietà (c. 1513; Museo Civico, Viterbo), and of the recently discovered Niobe Group (Florence, Uffizi). During his time in Urbino, Bandini maintained close ties with Florence, returning several times to fulfil portrait commissions. He was invited to contribute to the creation of the doors for Pisa Cathedral, although there is no evidence that he participated in the project. However, he did execute a statue of Ferdinando I de' Medici, commissioned in 1595, for the Piazza della Darsena Vecchia in Livorno. It was placed atop a pedestal featuring Four Moors by Pietro Tacca.

Bandini's final commission was a marble statue of Meleager (Genoa, Palazzo Belimbau). It was probably intended as a gift for Philip II of Spain from Francesco Maria della Rovere during the final years of his reign. Its frontal pose, reduction to essentials and sense of calm are all hallmarks of Bandini's Florentine manner. Bandini died in Florence on 18 April 1599. His work was particularly highly regarded during the Neoclassical period, likely due to the purity and simplicity of its forms. Leopoldo Cicognara discussed Bandini's work at length and with great enthusiasm in his Storia della Scultura.

== Gallery ==
Statue of James the Lesser, Florence Cathedral

Statue of Philip the Apostle, Florence Cathedral

Hercules and the Hydra, Villa Niccolini, Camugliano

Statue of Ferdinando I de' Medici, Piazza della Darsena Vecchia, Livorno

Bust of Mary Magdalene, Museo dell'Opera del Duomo, Florence

Juno, Palazzo Vecchio, Florence

Self-portrait as St. John the Evangelist, Museo Bandini, Fiesole

Bust of Brunelleschi, Museo dell'Opera del Duomo

== Bibliography ==
- Marcucci, Luisa (1963). "BANDINI, Giovanni, detto Giovanni dell'Opera". Dizionario Biografico degli Italiani (in Italian). Vol. 5: Bacca–Baratta. Rome: Institute of the Italian Encyclopaedia. OCLC 883370.
- Mandel, Corinne (2003). "Bandini, Giovanni (di Benedetto) [Giovanni dell'Opera]". Grove Art Online. Oxford: Oxford University Press. doi:10.1093/gao/9781884446054.article.T006102.
