= Equestrian statue of Henry IV =

Statue on the Pont Neuf, Paris

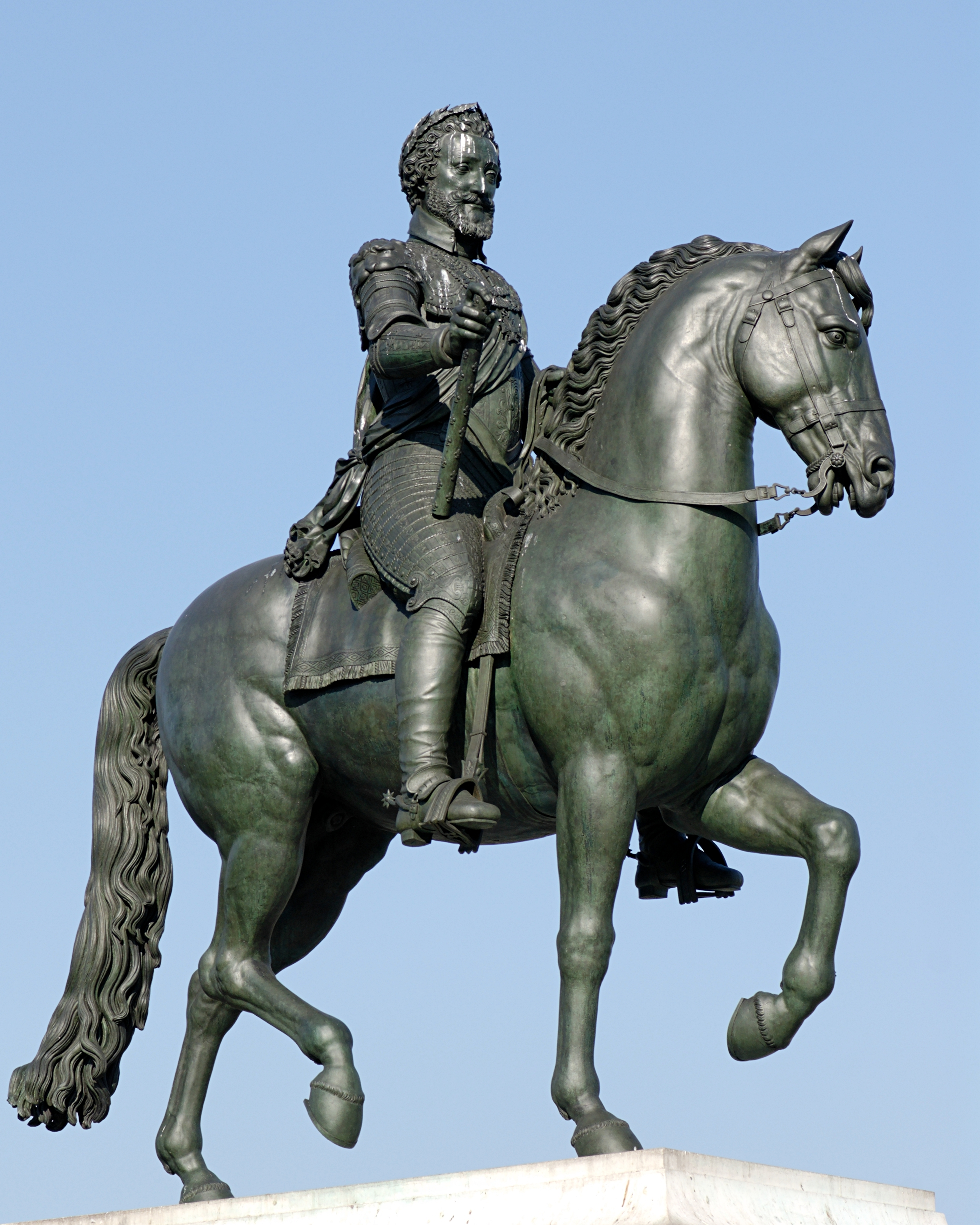
- Statue of Henry IV on the Pont Neuf (1614, destroyed 1792, replaced 1818)
- Artist: Pietro Tacca
- Year: 1618
- Medium: bronze
- Location: Paris

The equestrian statue of Henry IV is a bronze equestrian statue completed by Pietro Tacca. The statue, which now stands on the bridge Pont Neuf, was indirectly commissioned by Marie de Médicis for her husband, King Henry IV of France. The original commissioned artist, Giambologna, died before its completion, and Pietro Tacca took over the commission. The statue was erected in 1614, torn down in 1792 during the French Revolution, and rebuilt by 1818.

== Description ==
The original statue of King Henry IV depicts the king riding his horse, which is placed on top of a central raised pedestal. At each of the four corners of the pedestal is a bronze statue of a chained slave. The pedestal's design was made by Ludovico Cigoli with the help of Pietro Tacca, Pietro Francavilla and Francesco Bordoni in its creation.

According to the drawings of Ludovico Cigoli, a Medici court artist, the slaves were depicted with European features and posed with "Michaelangelsque contortions". The four slaves all rest on the bottom ledge of the pedestal and are chained to the harpies behind them on the upper corners of the pedestal. In Ludovico's drawing the slaves are bound with bands around their arms and chained to the harpies' hips. Other details on the pedestal are scenes of battle on the left and presumably the right side of the statue, along with "seated youths bearing swags".

According to Victoria Thompson, the king and horse's pose were heavily influenced by the Roman emperor Marcus Aurelius and his own equestrian statue.

== Creation ==
=== Commission ===
Marie de Médicis was the primary person to have wanted the creation of the statue of Henry IV. In 1604 it was most likely her that convinced her uncle, Ferdinando I, to have a miniature of the desired bronze statue commissioned. Due to her concerns on the potentially slow pace of the actual statue's completion (due to Giambologna's age, 75 at the time), she wanted to shorten the process. She did so by suggesting a time-saving idea. She suggested to Ferdinando I that since the bronze body and horse of his statue was already made, that it could be used instead of the original idea for the figure. He rejected the idea, but suggested that previous molds for his horse were to be reused instead.

Ferdinando I then visited Giambolongna's workshop to see the work that had been done. On September 17 and November 6 of 1607 he saw the cast of the horse and potentially any other progress that was made. Maria de Medici made her own checks on the workshop during 1606–1608. She used courtiers to keep tabs on the statue's progress. One by the name of Calvaliere Camillo Guidi was used to inform the King and Queen of anything concerning the statue's completion, whether it was a lack of labor or even money.

=== Delays ===
It was the concern for time that made Giambologna have his assistant, Pietro Tacca aid him on the project. Tacca had been the one to cast the bronze of both the horse and body of Henry IV. He had also been the one to have made the head of the statue and the extra embellishments on the front of Henry IV. He even had to take over the project when Giambolongna had died in August 1608. At the time of Giambologna's death, Pietro Tacca was working on a commission for the wedding of the Grand Duchess Cristina. Another instance included bad weather impeding the casting of the horses in bronze near the end of 1608.

Delays in the transport of the statue from the workshop to Paris occurred as well. Pietro Tacca and Giovan Battista Cresci had to weigh the statue, which took time that Marie de Médicis had not wanted to waste. Afterwards there was a stall after the statue's pieces arrived in Livorno, as no one decided to ship it out for almost a year. Various other delays occurred, such as complications in transportation by ship, like after landing in Savona, where the statue's parts were stranded on the seaport's docks for at least a week.

=== Completion ===
Prior to the statue's completion, Henry IV was assassinated. This then added to the significance of the statue as it had yet to be finished at the time. Even though the official date of the statue's completion is unknown, sources gathered by Kathrine Watson state that Baldinucci took note of its completion in 1611. The statue was then shipped out of the workshop on March 5, 1612 after it had been weighed for transport. The statue of the king and horse were placed on its base on Pont Neuf in 1614.

== Destruction of original ==
During the French Revolution, in 1792, the original statue was torn down from its spot on the Pont Neuf. It was around this time that many citizens became distrustful of their king, Louis XVI, due to increasing suspicions of him being a traitor. It was on August 11, 1792 that the citizens tore down the statues of Louis XIII, Louis XIV, and Louis XV. Henry IV's statue was torn down the next day. This delay was due to the "symbolic 'virtues' " the statue held to the people of the revolution. The bronze was melted down and used to make cannons.

The rider and horse were both destroyed, sparing only three pieces of the king, and a part of the horse. The four slaves on the pedestal, along with the four pieces of the king and horse, were saved and now reside in the Louvre.

== Recreation ==
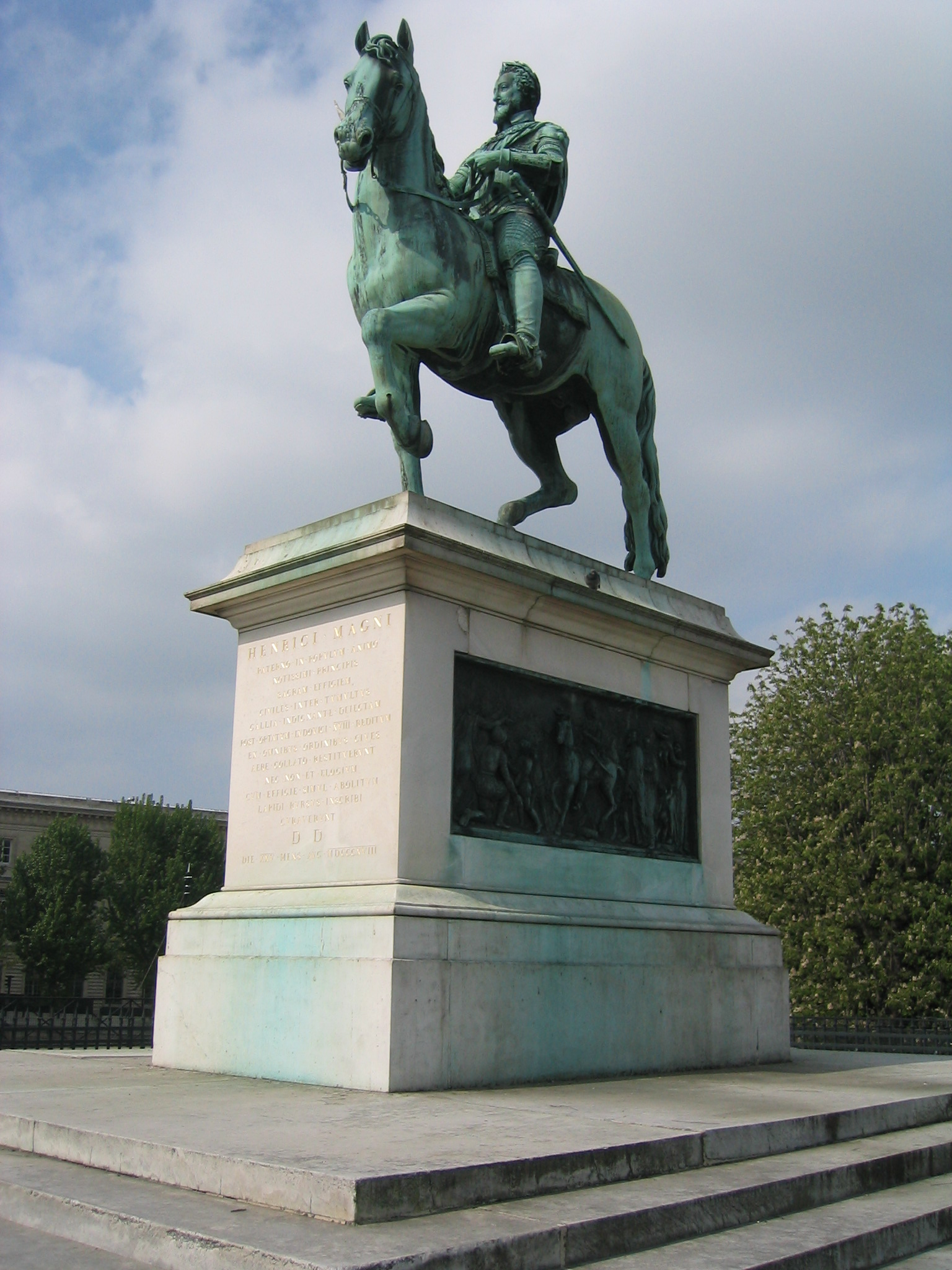
The statue in 2003

Prior to the French Revolution the people who learned of Henry IV's contributions to the history and wellbeing of France regarded him as the model of a good king. This contributed to the symbolism of the statue and its integration into royal ceremonies. As time went on, the oral stories and memories of the people continued, reinforcing the significance of the statue as it represented the important ideas and values that the people of France held to their future kings, like Louis XVI. When the Revolution began and the suspicions against Louis XVI grew, it clashed with the people's views and wishes of what their king was expected to represent.

When Louis XVIII, Louis XVI's brother, had re-entered Paris, a temporary replacement statue made of plaster-of-paris stood on Pont Neuf. This was made possible by the Minister of the Interior, Jacques Claude Beugnot. Due to the comparisons of Louis XVIII to Henry IV and many people's desires, plans for the restoration of the statue were underway.

Bronze for the new statue was obtained from a statue of Louis Charles Antoine Desaix, as well as from the statue of Napoleon in Place Vendôme. The new version of the statue, made by François-Frédéric Lemot, was finished by 1818.

The statue that can be seen today varies from its previous version. The current statue still retains the iconic pose of Henry IV and his horse, but the main differences are visible on the pedestal. The slaves, harpies, and youths from the previous version were not integrated into the present-day version of the piece.

== Bibliography ==
- Boime, Albert (Aug 18, 2004). Art in an Age of Counterrevolution, 1815–1848. University of Chicago Press.
- Borsook, Eve. “Art and Politics at the Medici Court IV: Funeral Decor for Henry IV of France.” Mitteilungen Des Kunsthistorischen Institutes in Florenz, vol. 14, no. 2, 1969, pp. 201–234. JSTOR, www.jstor.org/stable/27652233.
- Johnson, Geraldine A. (1997), "Imagining Images of Powerful Women: Maria de'Medici's Patronage of Art and Architecture," in: Women and Art in Early Modern Europe: Patrons, Collectors and Connoisseurs, ed. C. Lawrence, Penn State Press, pp. 132–133.
- Lingo, Estelle. Mochi's Edge and Bernini's Baroque. Harvey Miller Publishers, London, 2017.
- Rosen, Mark. “Pietro Tacca's ‘Quattro Mori’ and the Conditions of Slavery in Early Seicento Tuscany.” The Art Bulletin, vol. 97, no. 1, 2015, pp. 34–57., Www.jstor.org/stable/43947718.
- Thompson, Victoria E. “The Creation, Destruction and Recreation of Henri IV: Seeing Popular Sovereignty in the Statue of a King.” History and Memory, vol. 24, no. 2, 2012, pp. 5–40. JSTOR, www.jstor.org/stable/10.2979/histmemo.24.2.5.
- Watson, Katharine. Pietro Tacca, successor to Giovanni Bolognia. Garland Publishing, Inc. New York & London, 1983.
