= Palazzo della Carovana =

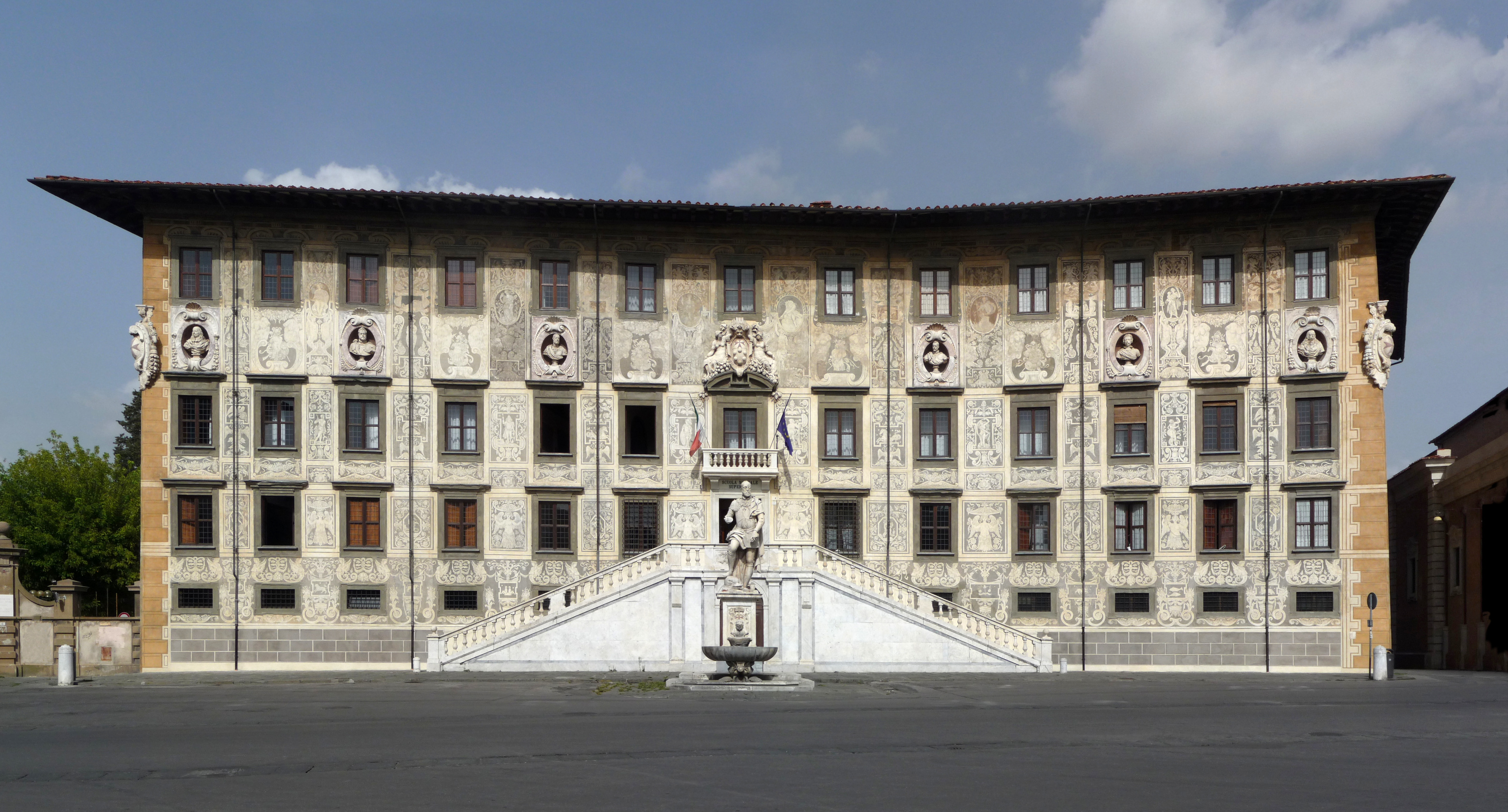
- Palazzo della Carovana

- Location within Italy
- Alternative names: Palace of the Convoy

General information
- Type: Palace
- Location: Piazza dei Cavalieri, 7, 56126 Pisa PI, Italy
- Coordinates: 43°43′10.60″N 10°24′0.81″E
- Completed: 1562–1564

Design and construction
- Architect: Giorgio Vasari

Palazzo della Carovana (also Palazzo dei Cavalieri) is a palace in Knights' Square, Pisa, Italy, presently housing the main building of the Scuola Normale Superiore di Pisa.

== History ==
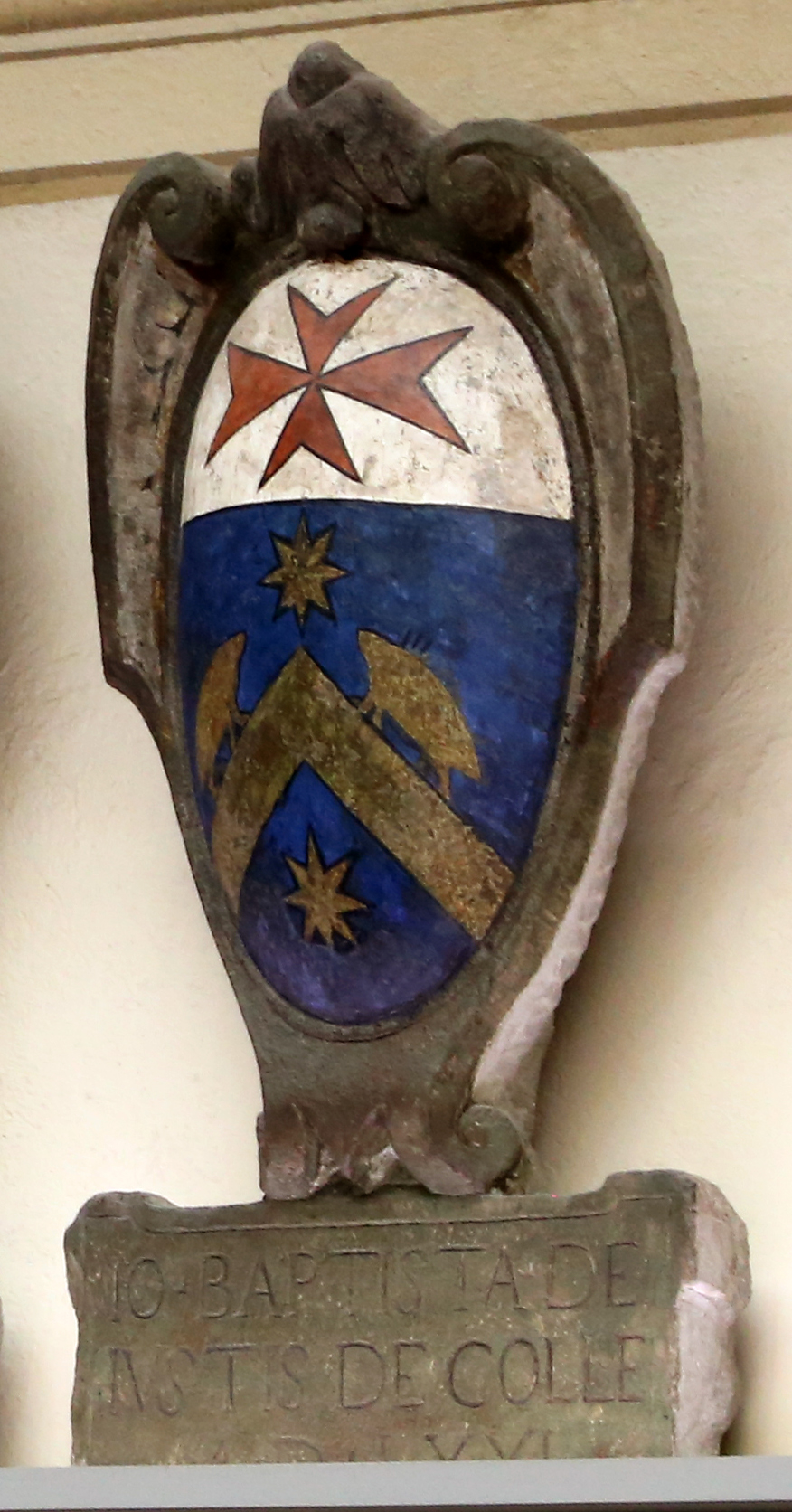
Giusti coat of arms found at palazzo della carovana

It was built in 1562–1564 by Giorgio Vasari for the headquarters of the Knights of St. Stephen, as a renovation of the already existing Palazzo degli Anziani ("Palace of the Elders"). The name, meaning "Palace of the Convoy", derives from the three-year period undertaken by the initiates of the Order for their training, called "la Carovana".

The façade is characterized by a complex scheme with sgraffiti representing allegorical figures and zodiacal signs, designed by Vasari himself and sculpted by Tommaso di Battista del Verrocchio and Alessandro Forzori, coupled to busts and marble crests. The current paintings date however to the 19th-20th centuries.

Amongst the sculptures are the Medici Coat of Arms and that of the Knights, flanked by the allegories of Religion and Justice by Stoldo Lorenzi (1563). The upper gallery of busts of the Grand Dukes of Tuscany (who were all also the Grand Masters of the Order) were added in the late 16th-early 18th centuries, sculpted by Ridolfo Sirigatti, Pietro Tacca and Giovan Battista Foggini. coat of arms found at palazzo della carovana. The double-ramp staircase was remade in 1821. The rear area is a modern addition (1928–1930) for the Scuola Normale Superiore di Pisa. Some halls of the interior house 16th-century paintings.
