= Piazza dei Cavalieri, Pisa =

Square in Pisa, Italy

Piazza dei Cavalieri
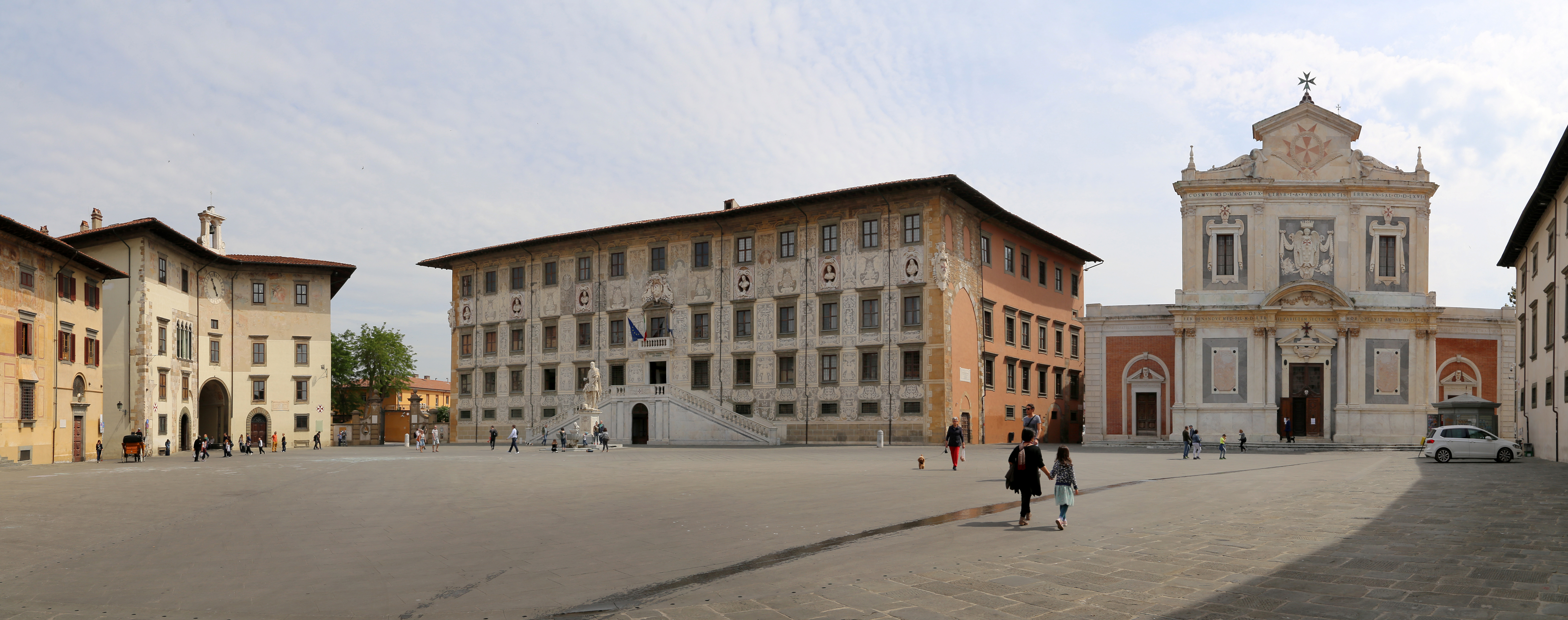

- Location within Tuscany
- Namesake: Knights of St. Stephen
- Location: Pisa, Tuscany, Italy
- Coordinates: 43.719433°N 10.400052°E

Piazza dei Cavalieri (lit. 'Knights' Square') is a landmark in Pisa, Italy, and the second main square of the city. This square was the political centre in medieval Pisa. After the middle of 16th century the square became the headquarters of the Order of the Knights of St. Stephen.

Now it is a centre of education, being the main house of the Scuola Normale di Pisa, a higher learning institution part of the University.

== History ==
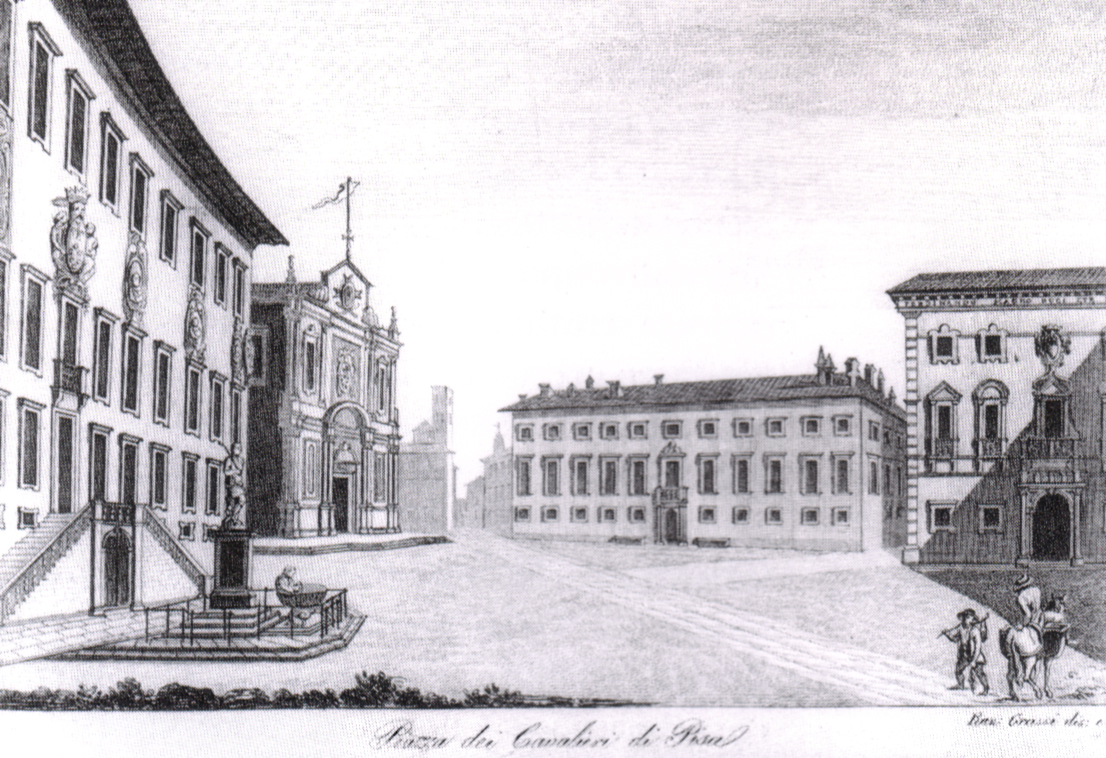
Ranieri Grassi, View of Knights' Square (1834)

=== Middle Ages ===
It was believed that it was located at the same place as the forum of the antique Portus Pisanus, the harbor of Pisa in Roman age, although that was not proven by any archaeological discovery. The square, known as Square of the seven streets (Piazza delle sette vie) was the political heart of the city, where the Pisans used to discuss their problems or celebrate their victories. After 1140, the square become the center of Pisa Comune, with construction of buildings belonging to several municipalities and magistrates, as well as several churches. After the victory of the People of Pisa (Popolo Pisano) in 1254, the Palace of the People and the Elders (Palazzo del Popolo e degli Anziani) was built on the square by joining some pre-existent buildings. The Captain of the People (Capitano del Popolo) was housed in the near Clock Palace (since 1357), which incorporated some previous existing towers. The southern part of the square was rebuilt with offices, law courts and the residence of the Podestà. There was also the church of Saint Sebastian alle Fabbriche Maggiori, destroyed by Vasari. The church, that was standing there at least since 1074, took the name by the offices of the blacksmiths (fabbri in Italian), located in the area.

=== Renaissance ===
On this square the emissary of Florence proclaimed the end of the independence of Pisa in 1406. After the conquest of Pisa, the buildings remained the same, but changed public offices, a Florentine Commissioner and the Priors instead of the Elders, and a chief of custody instead of the Captain of the People.

Later, in 1558, the square was rebuilt in Renaissance style by Giorgio Vasari, the famous architect of the Grand Duke Cosimo I de' Medici of Florence. He designed the Church of the Knights of the Holy and Military Order of St. Stephen (1565–1569), but it was mainly built by other architects. It replaced the church of Saint Sebastian. This is the only church in Pisa in Renaissance style. It contains Turkish naval banners captured by the Knights of St. Stephen during the naval battle of Lepanto on 7 October 1571.

The main building on the square is Palazzo della Carovana, the palace of the Knights of St. Stephen, and formerly the Palace of the Elders. It was modernised in Renaissance style by Giorgio Vasari. The façade is decorated with sgraffiti, equally by Vasari, and contains six niches with busts of grand dukes of Tuscany.

In front of the palace stands the large statue of Cosimo I de Medici by Pietro Francavilla, who also designed the Palace of the Priors in 1603.

In the other corner of the square stands the Palazzo dell'Orologio, which is referred to in Dante's Inferno.

=== 20th century ===
Nowadays the Palazzo della Carovana houses the main building of the Scuola Normale Superiore di Pisa, a university founded by Napoleon Bonaparte and modeled after the Ecole Normale Superieure of Paris. Italian poet Giosuè Carducci and physicist Enrico Fermi are among some of the pupils who have studied here. There is also the house of the Confraternita della Misericordia, a Catholic ambulance service.

== Buildings in the square ==
- Church of Santo Stefano dei Cavalieri
- Palazzo della Carovana
- Statue of Cosimo I
- Palazzo dell'Orologio
- Church of St. Rocco
- Palazzo del Collegio Puteano
- Palazzo del Consiglio dei Dodici
- Canonica
- Muda Tower

== Images gallery ==
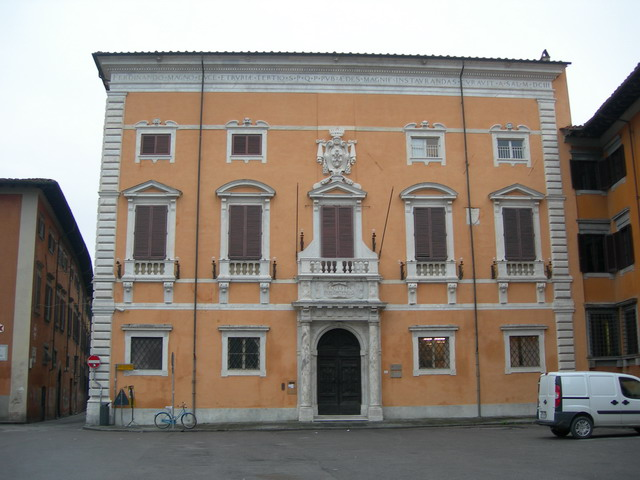
Palazzo del Consiglio dei Dodici

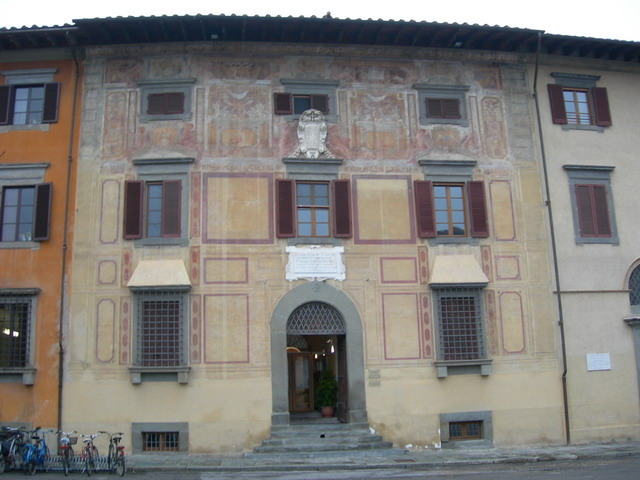
Palazzo del Collegio Puteano

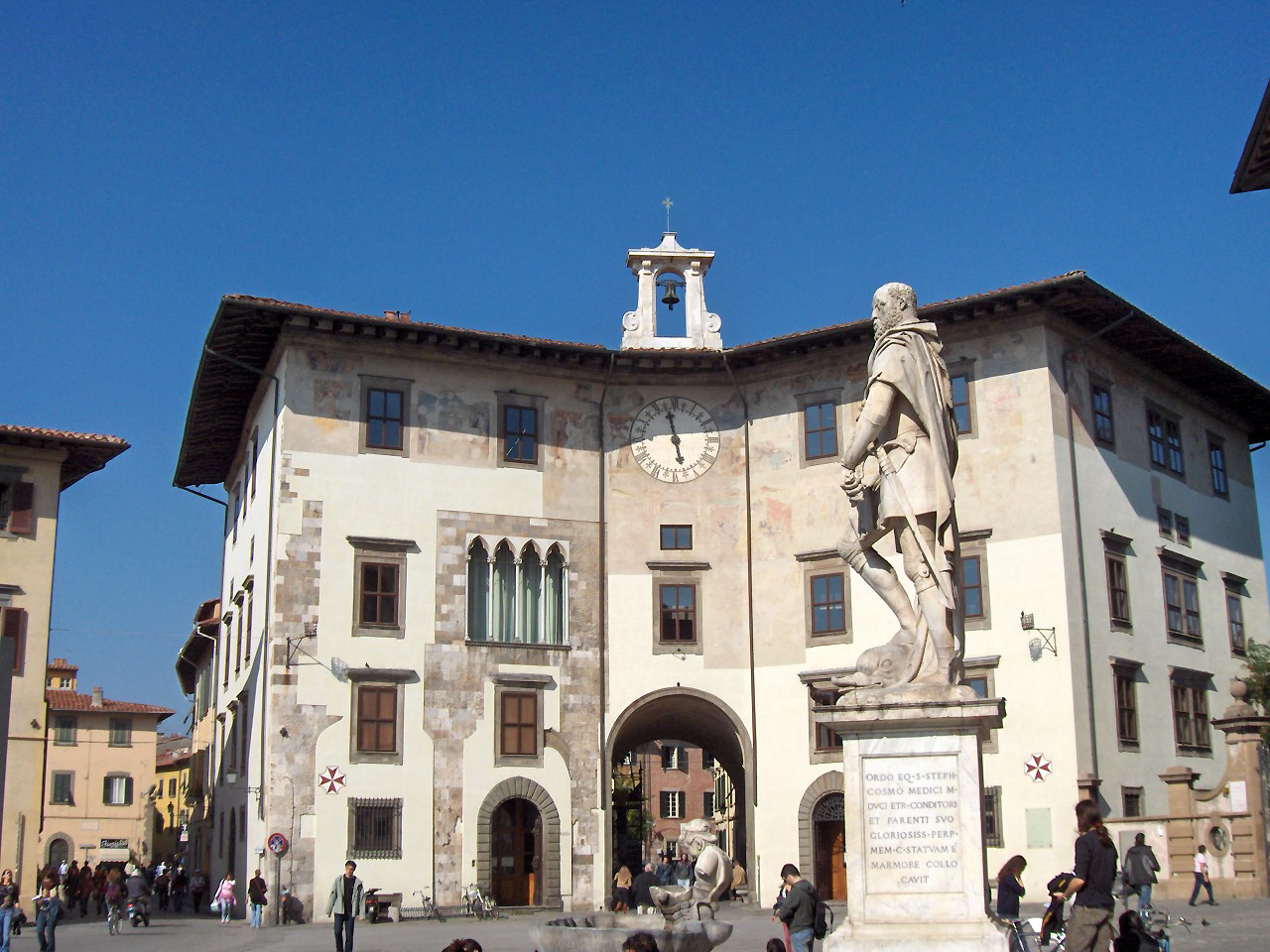
Palazzo dell'Orologio with the statue of Cosimo I

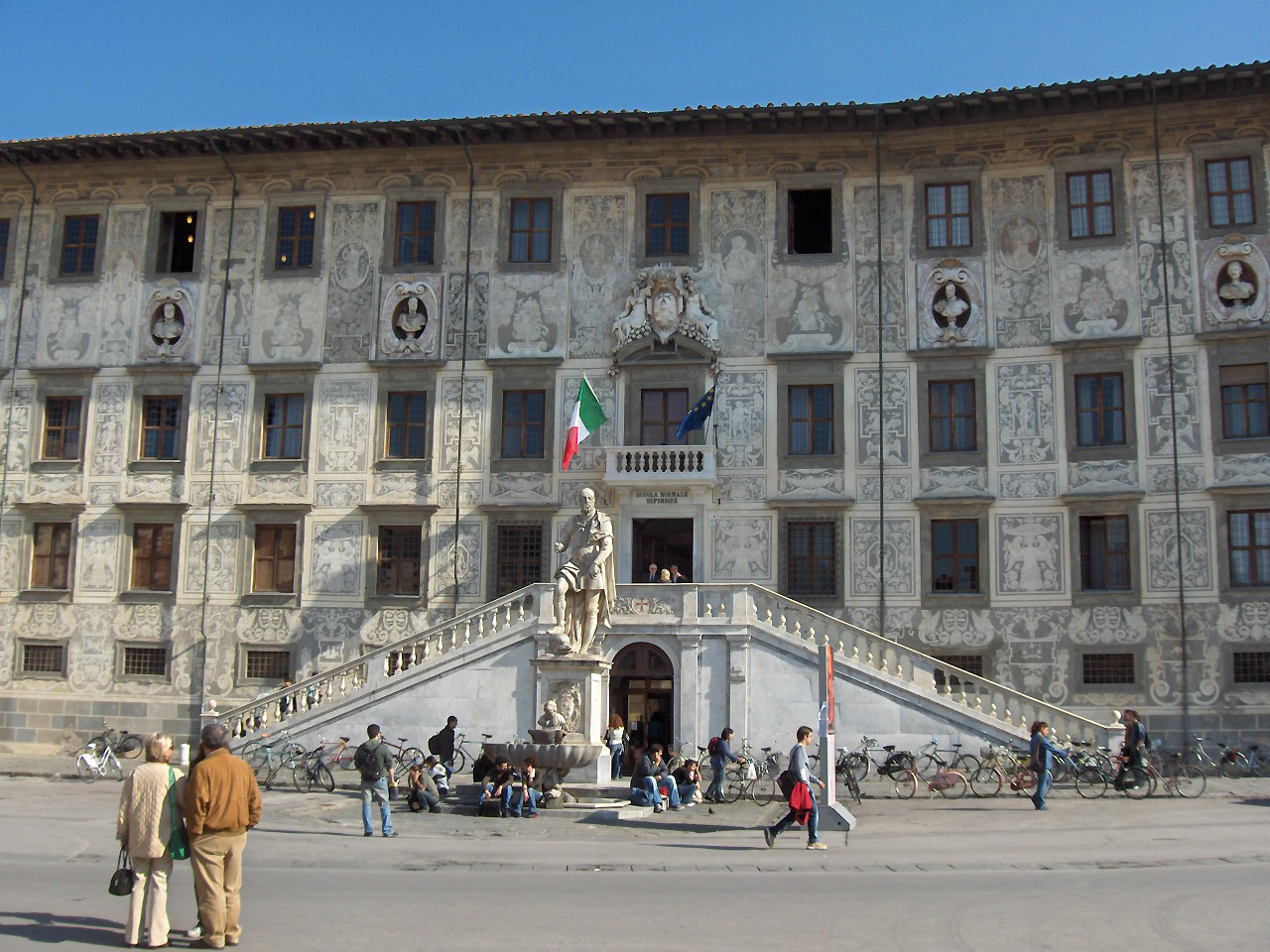
Palazzo della Carovana

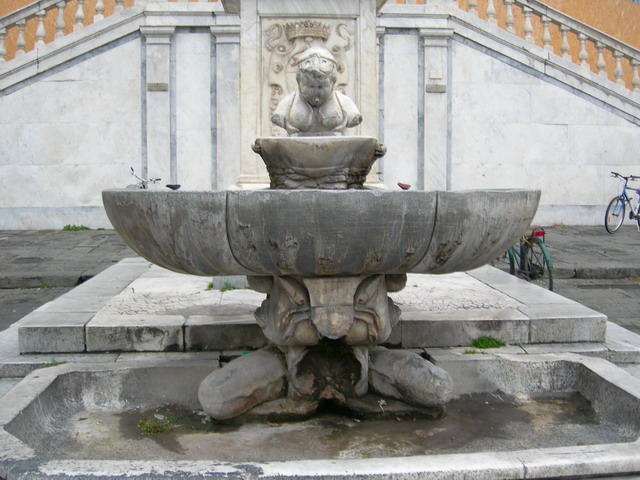
Fountain by Pietro Francavilla

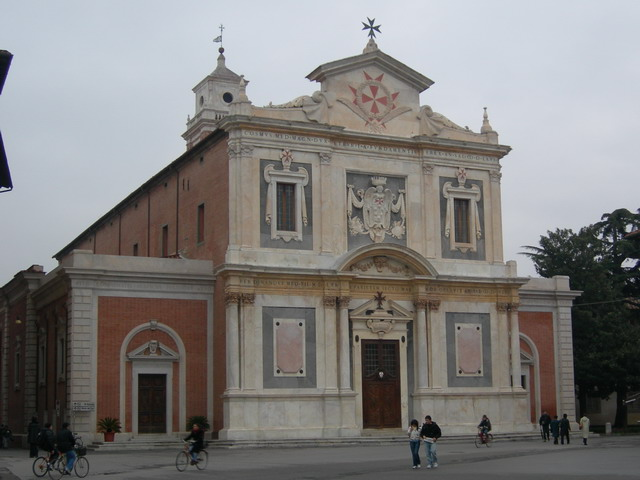
Church of the Knights of the Holy and Military Order of St. Stephen

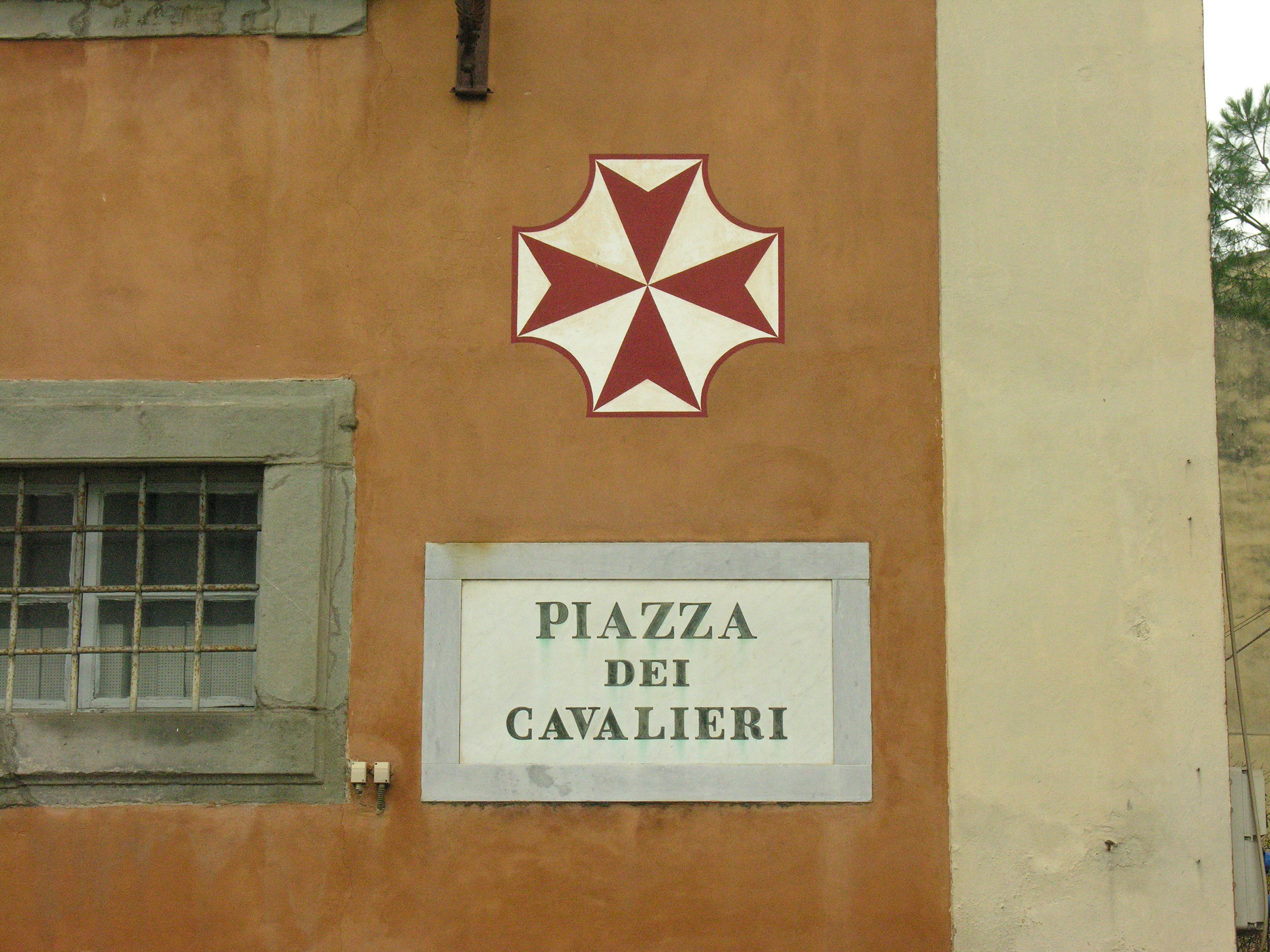
Street sign

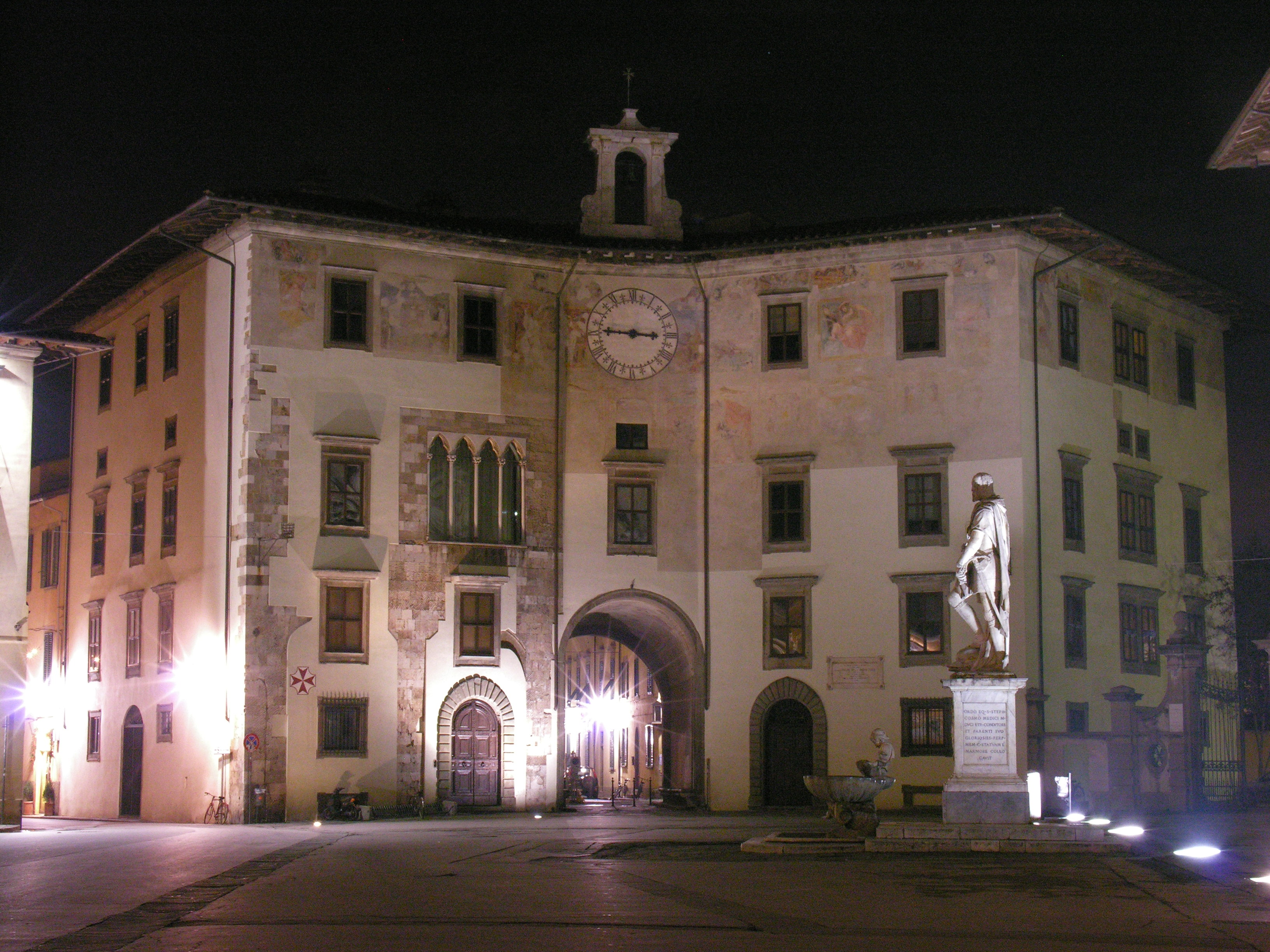
Palazzo dell'Orologio by Night
