= Francesco Bordoni =

Italian sculptor

- Born: 1580; Florence, Grand Duchy of Tuscany
- Died: 1654 (aged 73–74); Paris, Kingdom of France
- Occupation: Sculptor

Francesco Bordoni (1580–1654), also known as Francisque Bourdon, was an Italian sculptor who was active mainly in France. He was born in Florence and died in Paris. He was a student and son-in-law of Pietro Francesco Francavilla, and he completed a number of Francavilla's sculptures after the latter's death in 1615.
