= San Rocco, Pisa =

Roman Catholic church in Pisa, Italy

Coordinates: 43°43′10.22″N 10°23′58.22″E

San Rocco
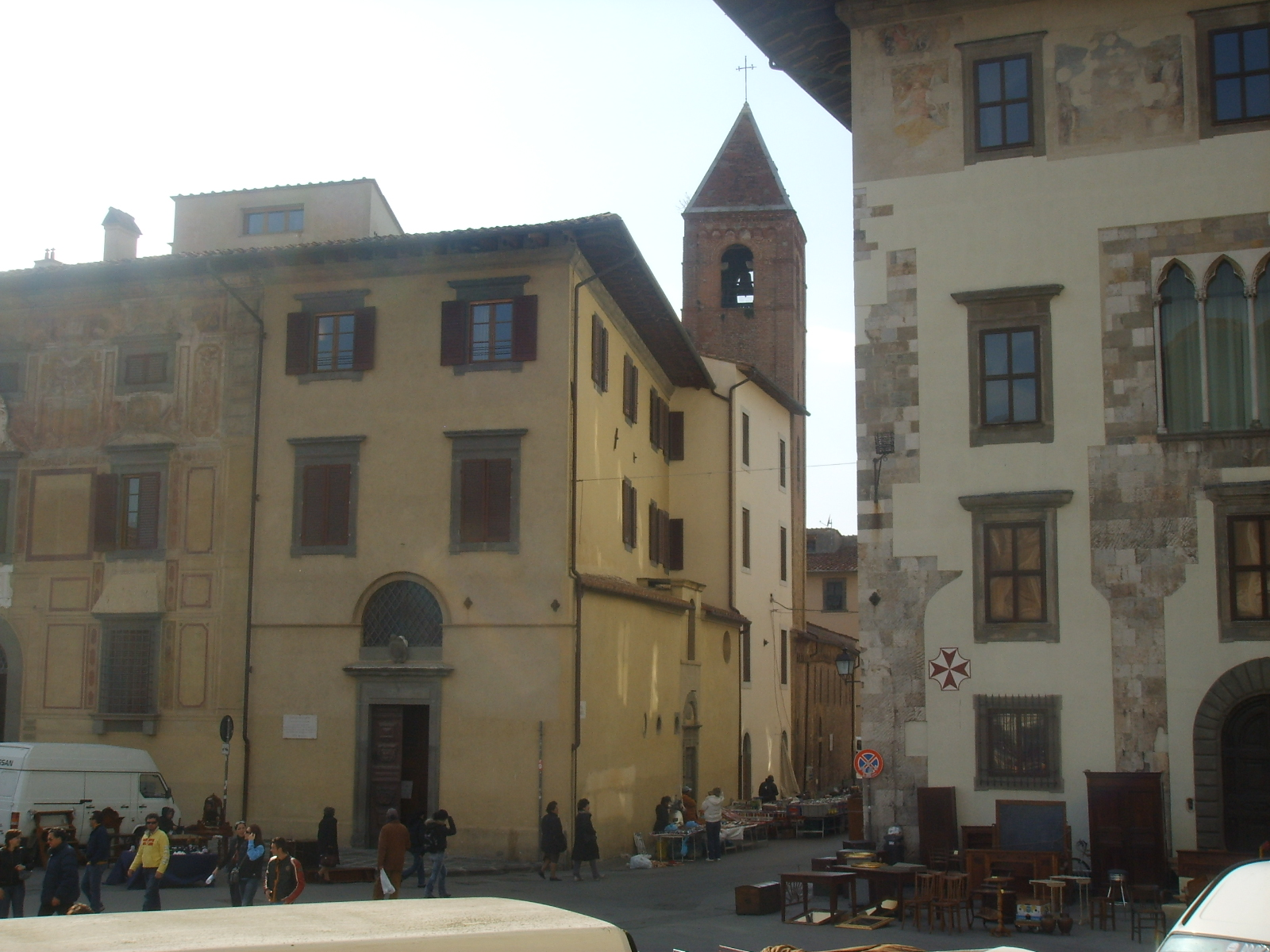
- Facade on Piazza di Cavalieri

Religion
- Affiliation: Roman Catholic
- Province: Pisa

Location
- Location: Pisa, Italy
- Interactive map of San Rocco

Architecture
- Type: Church
- Style: Baroque
- Groundbreaking: 1028
- Completed: 1634

San Rocco is a small Baroque-style, Roman Catholic church facing the Piazza dei Cavalieri in central Pisa, Italy.

== History ==
The church San Pietro in Cortevecchia is mentioned in documents from 1028. In 1575, a near complete reconstruction occurred when the church was granted to the Company (Order) of Saint Roch (San Rocco). Architect Cosimo Pugliani added a new façade in 1630–1634. The Order of St. Rocco was suppressed in 1782, and the church soon fell under the care of the diocese, and another restoration occurred in 1899.

The interior has frescos in the niches from the 13th century. The ceiling fresco of St Rocco protecting those affected with the plague is attributed to Francesco Venturi.

The altar has a crucifixion from the 16th century and a Madonna and child from the 15th century in polychrome terracotta. On the altar on the left nave is a canvas of St Rocco attributed to Giovanni Antonio Sogliani.
