= Palazzo Belimbau =

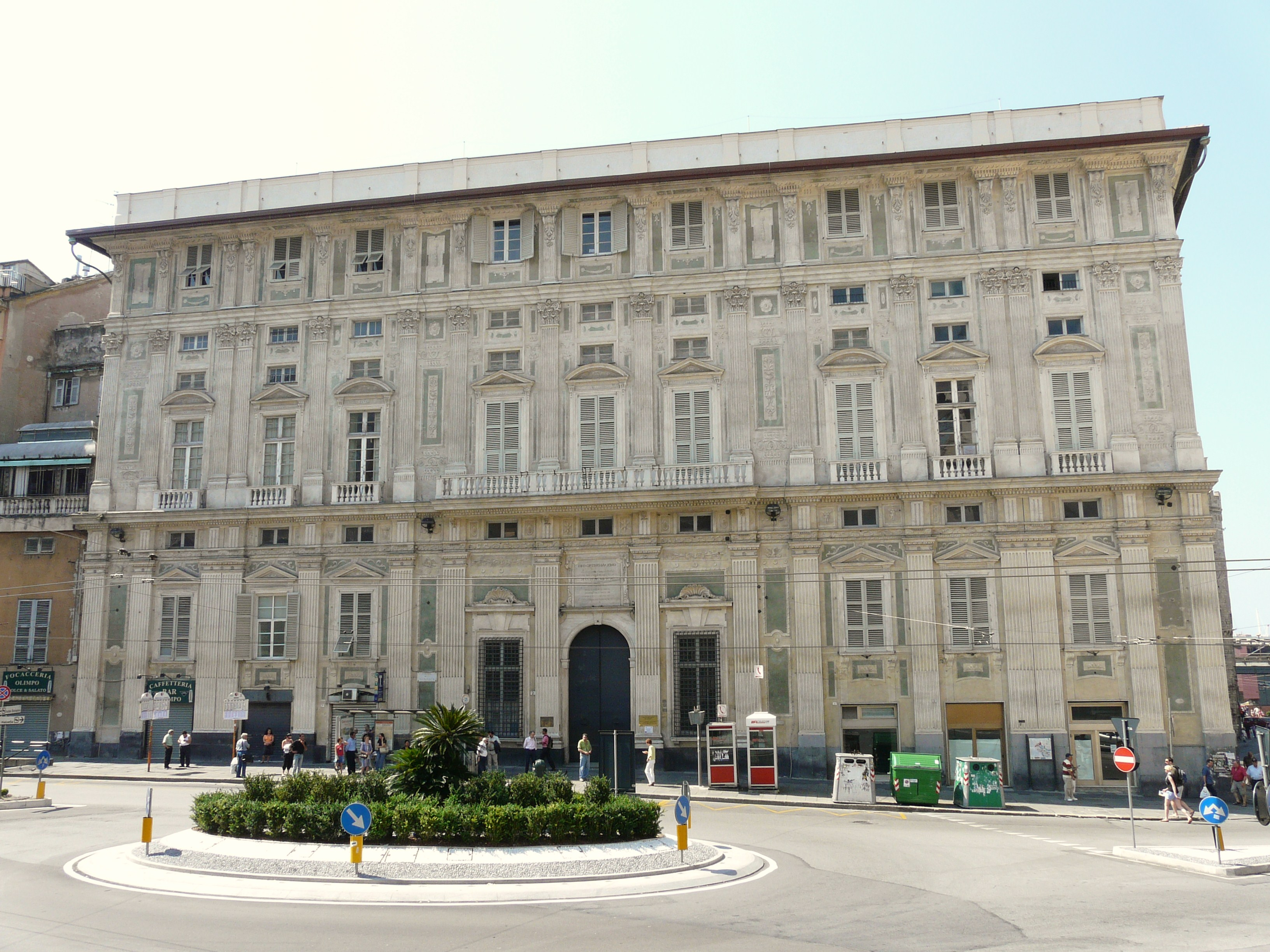
- Facade of the Palazzo Belimbau in Piazza della Nunziata 2
- Interactive map of the Palazzo Belimbau area
- Alternative names: palazzo Antoniotto Cattaneo, Palazzo Francesco De Ferrari

General information
- Status: In use
- Type: Palace
- Architectural style: Mannerist
- Location: Genoa, Italy, 2, Piazza della Nunziata
- Coordinates: 44.41345°N 8.92839°E
- Construction started: 1594
- Completed: 1594

Design and construction
- Architects: Giovanni Battista Pellegrini; Bartolomeo Bernasconi
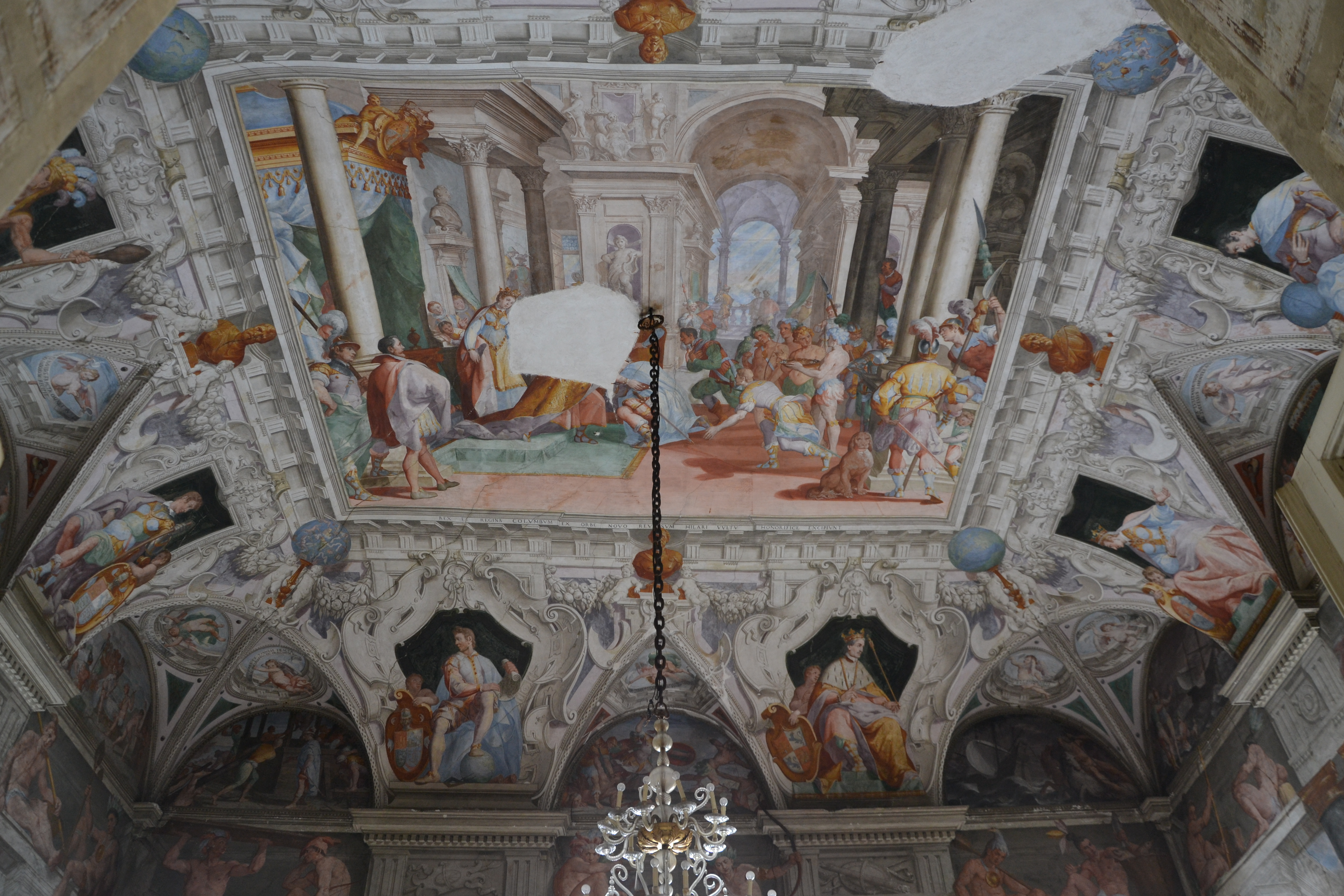

UNESCO World Heritage Site
- Part of: Genoa: Le Strade Nuove and the system of the Palazzi dei Rolli
- Criteria: Cultural: (ii)(iv)
- Reference: 1211
- Inscription: 2006 (30th Session)

The palazzo Belimbau, also known as palazzo Antoniotto Cattaneo or Palazzo Francesco De Ferrari, is a building in Piazza della Nunziata at number 2 in Genoa, included on 13 July 2006 in the list of the 42 palaces inscribed in the Rolli di Genova that became World Heritage by UNESCO on that date.

== History ==
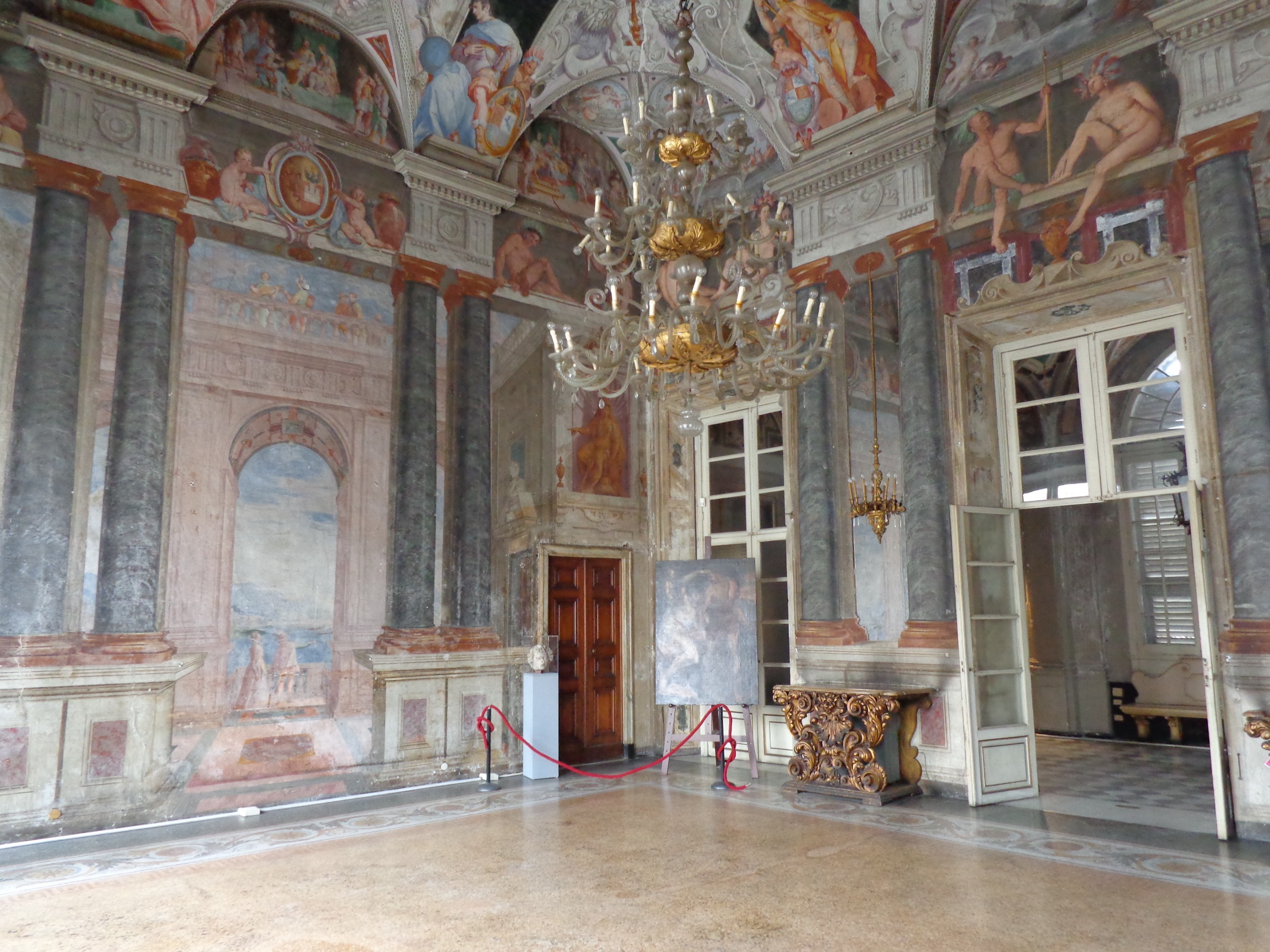
Columbus Hall

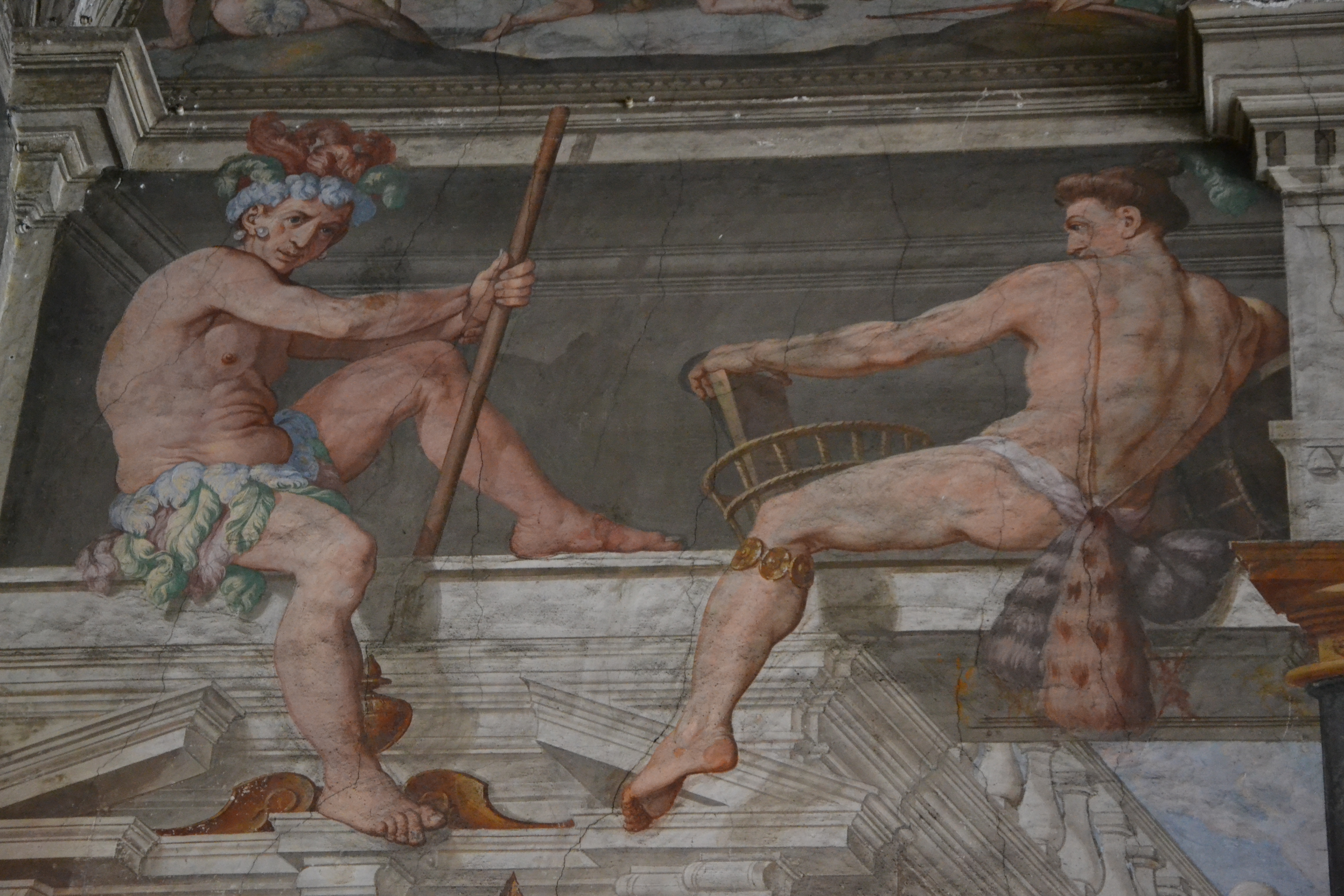
Lazzaro Tavarone, Indigenous, 1610

The palace was initially built by Antoniotto Cattaneo, a member of the old Genoese nobility, who completed the construction of the building in 1594.

The residence then became the property of Francesco De Ferrari, who with his wife Delia Giustiniani, between 1604 and 1611, probably entrusting the work to the architect Ceresola known as Andrea Vannone, renovated it and united it with another of his adjoining residences, thus giving the building its present architectural and volumetric consistency.

=== Baroque decoration ===
In the first decade of the 17th century, the family commissioned Lazzaro Tavarone (Genoa 1556–1641), a pupil of Luca Cambiaso, to decorate the palace with a vast pictorial cycle with a historical-celebratory theme, which would be deployed on the walls and vault (architecture) of the vestibule, the grand staircase and various rooms on the piano nobile. The frescoes decorating the entrance vestibule, which gives access to the monumental staircase, are dedicated to the life of Cleopatra. In the centre of the vault, the main panel depicts the queen of Egypt sailing in the waters of the Cnidus river, on the grandiose ship with a golden stern and silver oars, as narrated by Plutarch in his Vieces. All around it within painted mock architectures are fanciful grotesque decorations of a still late Mannerist taste, interspersed with full-length portraits of condottieri. The cycle dedicated to Cleopatra continues on the monumental staircase, where The Meeting of Antony and Cleopatra.

At the end of the staircase, an entrance vestibule leads to the monumental hall facing the balcony overlooking Piazza dell’Annunziata, entirely covered with frescoes dedicated by Tavarone to the Imprese di Cristoforo Colombo Christopher Columbus's exploits. The characters and events depicted are taken from the Historie della vita e dei fatti di Cristoforo Colombo Historie della vita e dei fatti di Cristoforo Colombo by Fernando Colombo, second son of the famous navigator, published in Venice in 1571. The narration of the vicissitudes of the navigator from Genoa, of humble origins, who went on to accomplish the heroic feats that made him immortal, alludes to the story of the commissioner, Francesco De Ferrari, who had gained noble rank with the leges novae of 1575, later marrying Delia Giustiniani (Genoese family), belonging to one of the oldest noble families, which is instead alluded to in the story of Cleopatra.

In accordance with the custom of 16th-century pictorial decoration, here too the decoration has its main focus in a vast panel covering the centre of the vault, depicting the most salient episode, «Isabella of Castile and Ferdinand of Aragon receive Columbus on his return from the New World», when the sovereign of Spain embraces the Genoese navigator who has returned triumphant from the enterprise. The twelve lunettes on the walls contain as many episodes from the navigator's life, each accompanied by putti with explanatory cartouches. The walls are frescoed with Trompe-l'œil perspective illusions, which pretend to be landscapes of the Riviera, fake architecture and some characters, probably including the artist himself and his patron, while above the architraves there are Native American Indians and putti holding the two family coats of arms (De Ferrari and De Ferrari Giustiniani), in which Tavarone shows off his expertise in the representation of nudes.

A few years after 1611, the palace passed into the hands of the Chiavari family.

After 1768 it passed to the Cambiaso family who, from 1780, commissioned a general renovation of the building from the architect Giovanni Battista Pellegrini (architect): the façade towards the piazza, marked by a mixed quadrature, with an architectural order of classicist taste and mirrored frescoes, and the staircase, are the work of the architects Giovanni Battista Pellegrini and Bartolomeo Bernasconi, who in 1785 directed the renovation of the building for the Cambiaso family.

In 1815, it was the residence of Pope Pius VII, a prisoner of Napoleon Bonaparte who was passing through Genoa, as recalled by an inscription on the entrance portal on the piano nobile.

After 1824, with the marriage of Marina Chiavari and Giovanni Battista Negrotto Cambiaso, the palace became the property of the Negrotto Cambiaso family.

=== The palace in the 20th century ===
In 1890, the palace passed to the Cohen Belimbau family — first to the Genoese banker Enrico, then to his son Eugenio and finally to his grandson Enrico Luigi, the last heir of the dynasty, who died without offspring in 1991 — who gradually transformed the palace into office space.

The complete lack of maintenance led to a rapid deterioration of the entire building in the 20th century. Added to this was the serious damage done to the fresco cycles, the art collections contained therein, and the palace itself, by the Allied bombings of October 1943, which also severely damaged the neighbouring Palazzo Nicolò Lomellini and the right aisle of the Basilica of the Santissima Annunziata.

In the second half of the 20th century, the building was the seat of the French consulate, then housed the offices for the university's student welfare work, and finally the nascent Centre for Lifelong Learning (PerForm), the latter of which is still present today.

After the death in 1991 of Enrico Luigi, the last heir of the Belimbau dynasty, the elderly widow, Mrs. Rossana Iannoni, who remained the sole heir to the family's universal patrimony, donated the palace to the University of Genoa, with the clause that the university, by accepting the donation, would not be able to alienate the ownership of the building until her death, which occurred in September 2007. The university therefore began restoration work on the roof and façade, completed in 2004.

In September 2007, with the death of the widow Belimbau, and the consequent loss of the university's restriction preventing the sale of the donated property, the university considered the possibility of selling it to cover the 15 million euro budget hole that had emerged in the meantime, which was later cleared without resorting to this solution.

In 2009, the main local institutions involved, as part of a larger renovation project of the buildings owned by the university for a total investment of approximately 110 million euros, which included the restoration of Palazzo Belimbau, agreed on the need to move to Palazzo Belimbau, after renovation of the interior spaces to be used for this purpose, of part of the administrative offices that had been located in the nearby Palazzo Cristoforo Spinola and Palazzo Filippo Lomellini, in which the university was still a tenant (in the former of the two buildings it still is). Since the hoped-for renovation did not take place for a number of reasons, including the absence of the necessary substantial funds, the relocation of these offices was no longer realised.

Nell’agosto 2016 il governo ha stanziato un contributo di 1,4 milioni di euro per la ristrutturazione degli spazi interni del palazzo.

The building, with an internal surface area of approximately 3,300 m^{2} (36,000 ft^{2}), houses only university offices, except for the ground floor where there are also some commercial activities. The building currently houses the following offices Servizio Apprendimento Permanente (formerly Perform, Centre for Lifelong Learning), located on the 2nd Floor (main floor) and for the administrative part on the 1st Floor; Servizio Interventi Straordinari and Servizio Progettazione e Sviluppo Edilizio (Planning and Building Development Service), on the 1st and 4th Floors respectively; and Sportello Unico Studenti di Scienze Sociali (formerly Segreteria Studenti di Scienze Sociali (Social Sciences Student Secretariat), at no. 9R in Piazza della Nunziata (corner of Via delle Fontane).

The main floor of the palace, containing the most valuable elements, is periodically open for visits by the public as part of the Rolly Days event.

== Bibliography ==
=== Italian sources ===
- Palazzo Belimbau e il ciclo colombiano, Documenti d’arte – Regione Liguria, Istituto Geografico De Agostini, 1986.
- Guida ai palazzi dei Rolli di Genova, a cura di A. M. Parodi, Genova, Banca Carige, 2007.
- Laura Magnani (a cura di), Palazzo Belimbau – I dipinti restaurati, Università degli studi di Genova, Genova, 2015.
- E. Poleggi, Genova. Una civiltà di Palazzi, Cinisello Balsamo (Milano) 2002, pp. 129–131 (Palazzo di Francesco De Ferrari (1594–1604))
- C. Pastor, Palazzo Francesco De Ferrari, in “Arkos”, supplemento al n. 7/2004 “Il restauro dei palazzi dei Rolli”, pp. 134–139.
- E. Parma, Palazzo de Ferrari Chiavari Belimbau, in Città Ateneo Immagine. Patrimonio storico artistico e sedi dell’Università di Genova, a cura di L. Magnani, Genova 2014, pp. 117–131
