= Pietro Tacca =

Italian sculptor

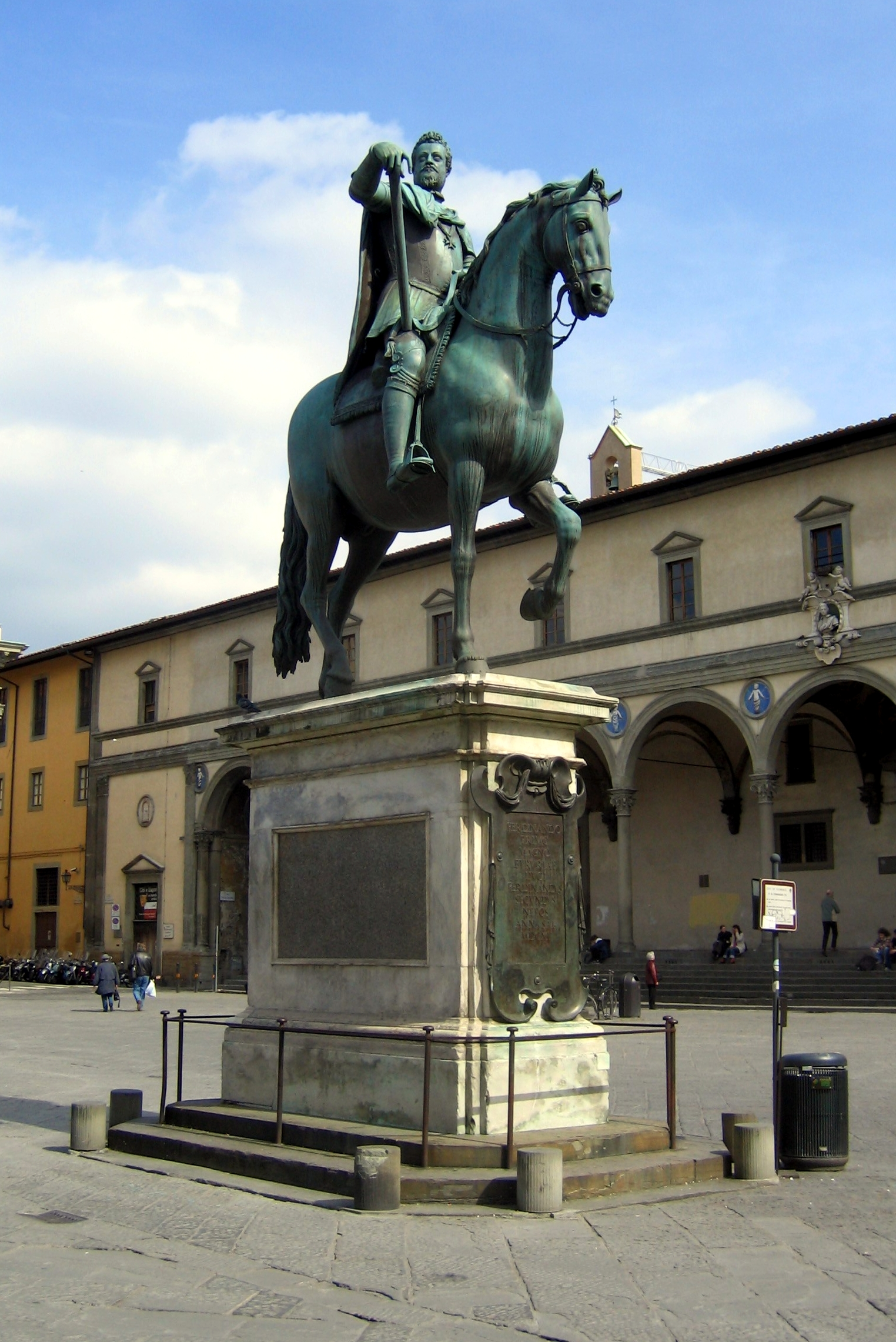
Giambologna's equestrian bronze of Ferdinando I de' Medici, Grand Duke of Tuscany for the Piazza della SS. Annunziata; completed by his assistant, Pietro Tacca.

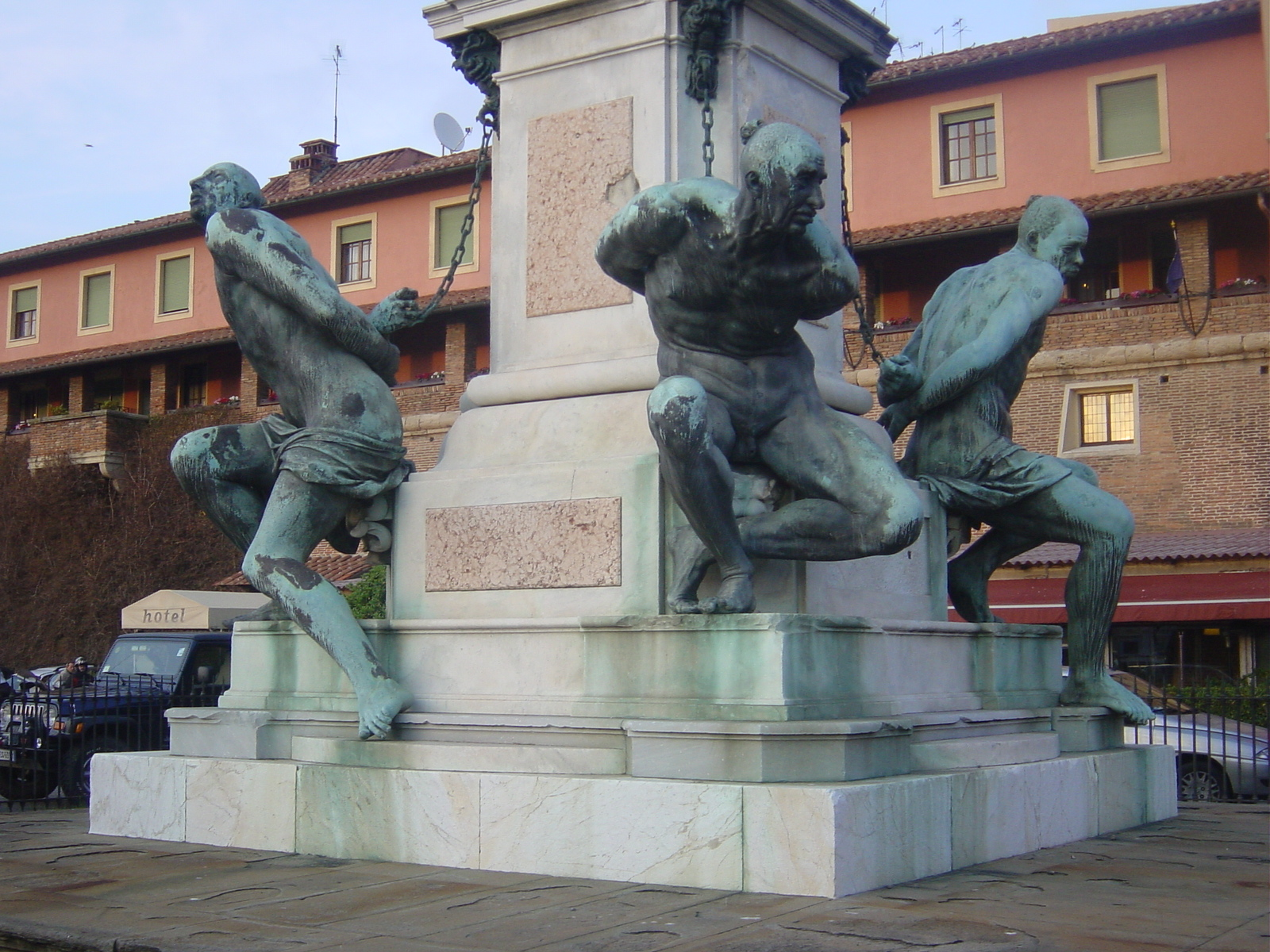
Quattro Mori: prisoners at the foot of the Monument of Ferdinand I de' Medici, Livorno.

Pietro Tacca (16 September 1577 – 26 October 1640) was an Italian sculptor, who was the chief pupil and follower of Giambologna. Tacca began in a Mannerist style and worked in the Baroque style during his maturity.

== Biography ==
Born in Carrara, Tuscany, he joined Giambologna's atelier in 1592. Tacca took over the workshop of his master on the elder sculptor's death in 1608, finishing a number of Giambologna's incomplete projects, and succeeding him almost immediately as court sculptor to the Medici Grand Dukes of Tuscany. Like his master he took full advantage of the fashion among connoisseurs for table-top reductions of fine bronze sculptures. Louis XIV possessed Giambolognesque bronzes of Heracles and the Erymanthian Boar ( and Heracles and the Cerynian Stag (now Louvre Museum) that are now attributed to Tacca, and dated to the 1620s. .

Tacca began by finishing Giambologna's equestrian bronze of Ferdinand de' Medici for the Piazza della SS. Annunziata, a project in which he had participated at every stage, from the terracotta models to the casting process in the fall of 1602 and the finishing (by 1608). This work was cast with the bronze from the cannons of captured Barbary and Ottoman galleys, taken by the Order of Saint Stephen, of which the Grand Duke Ferdinando I de' Medici was Grand Master.

Tacca's public works for the Medici include his masterpieces, the "Monument of the Four Moors", representing captured Barbary corsairs or Ottoman pirates (1620–24) at the foot of Giovanni Bandini's statue of Ferdinand I de' Medici, intended to celebrate the above-mentioned victories, in Piazza della Darsena, Livorno. Reduced scale bronze adaptations were made by Foggini and these were to be the basis of reproductions for connoisseurs into the 18th century. Ceramic versions were made by Doccia and other manufacturers. One of Tacca's disciples, Taddeo di Michele, executed a trophy of Barbary arms accompanying the prisoners; it was looted by French troops in 1799 and is now in the Louvre Museum.

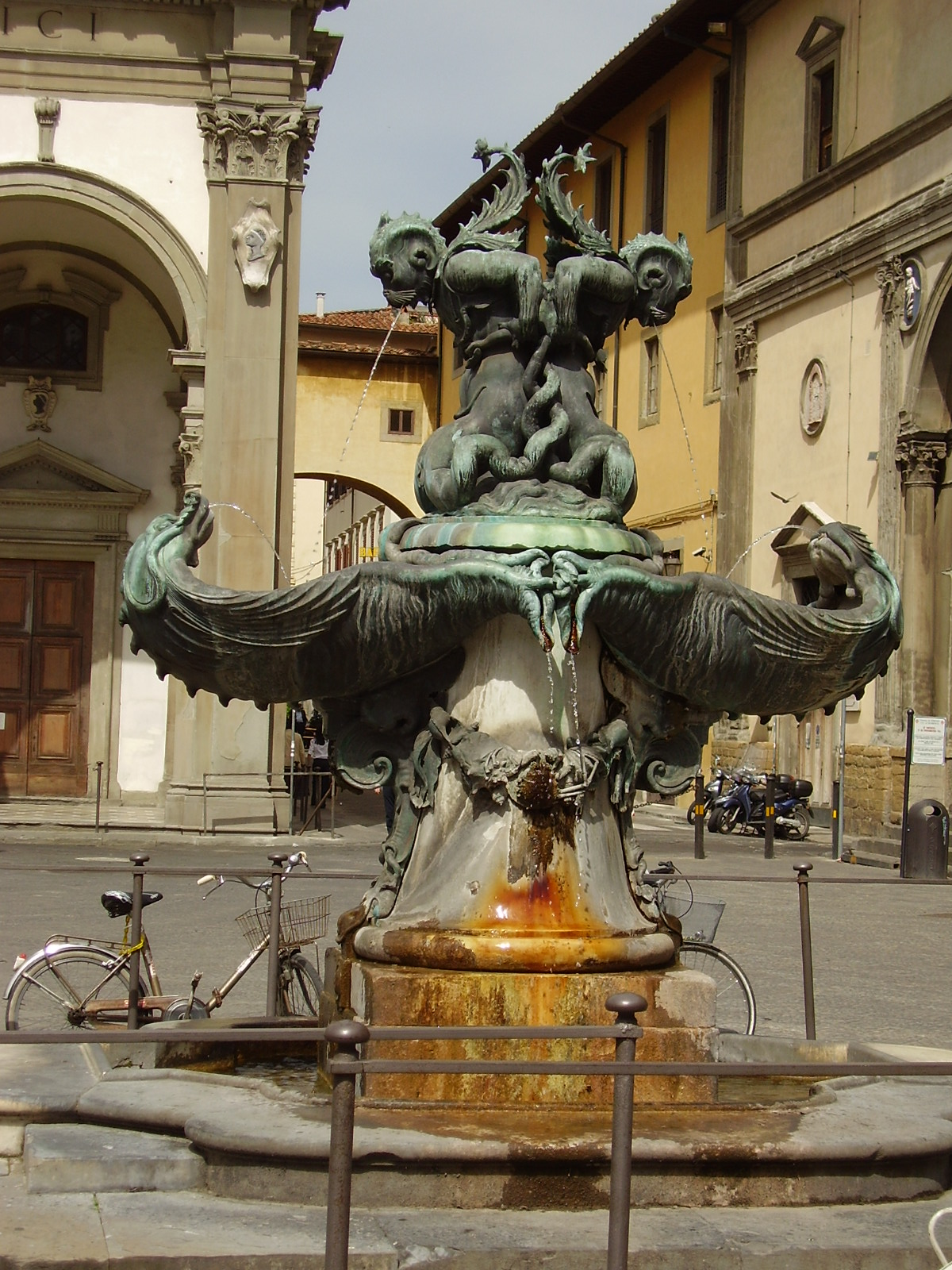
Fountain in Piazza Santissima Annunziata, Florence.

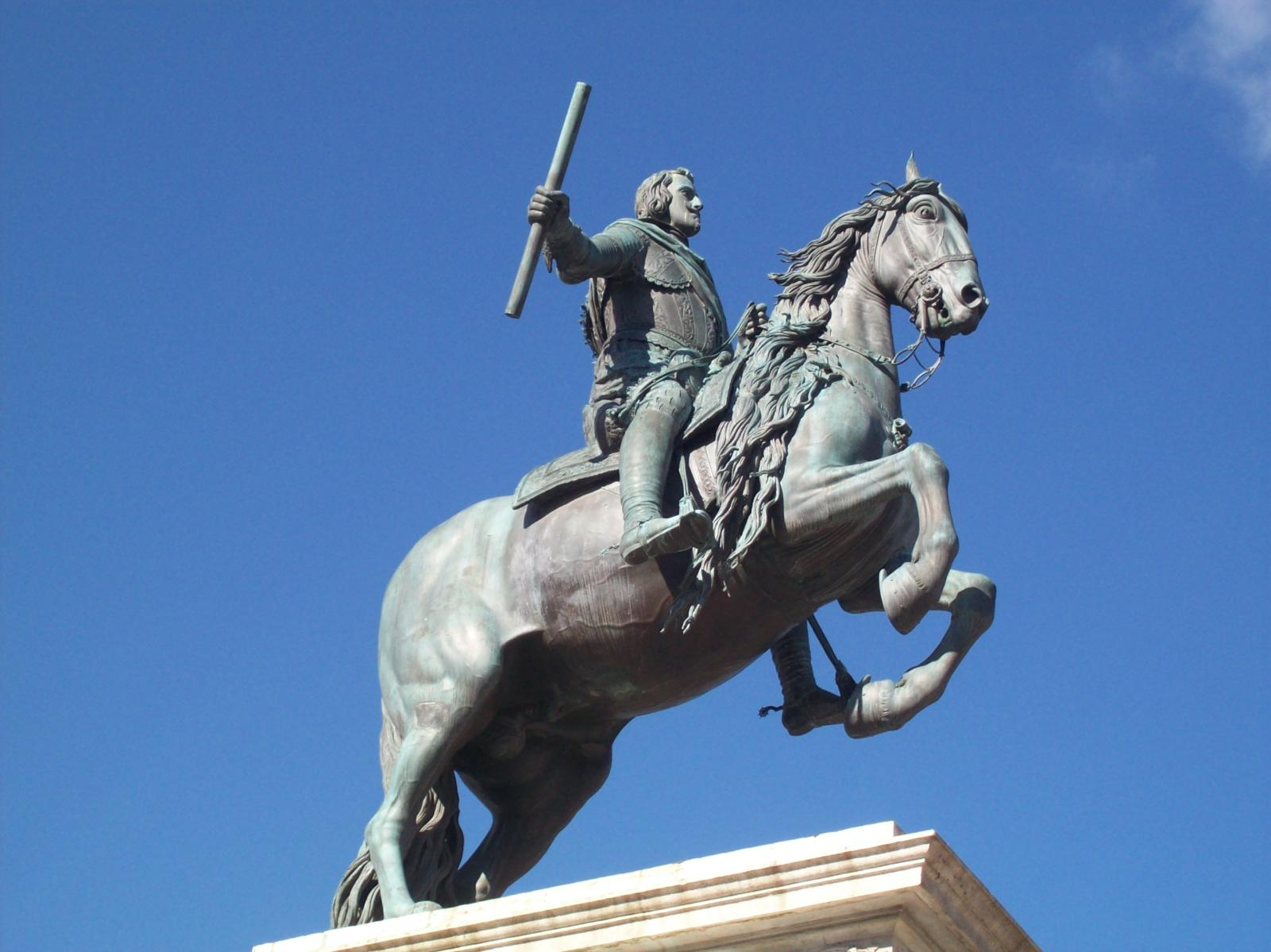
Philip IV of Spain in the centre of Plaza de Oriente in Madrid.

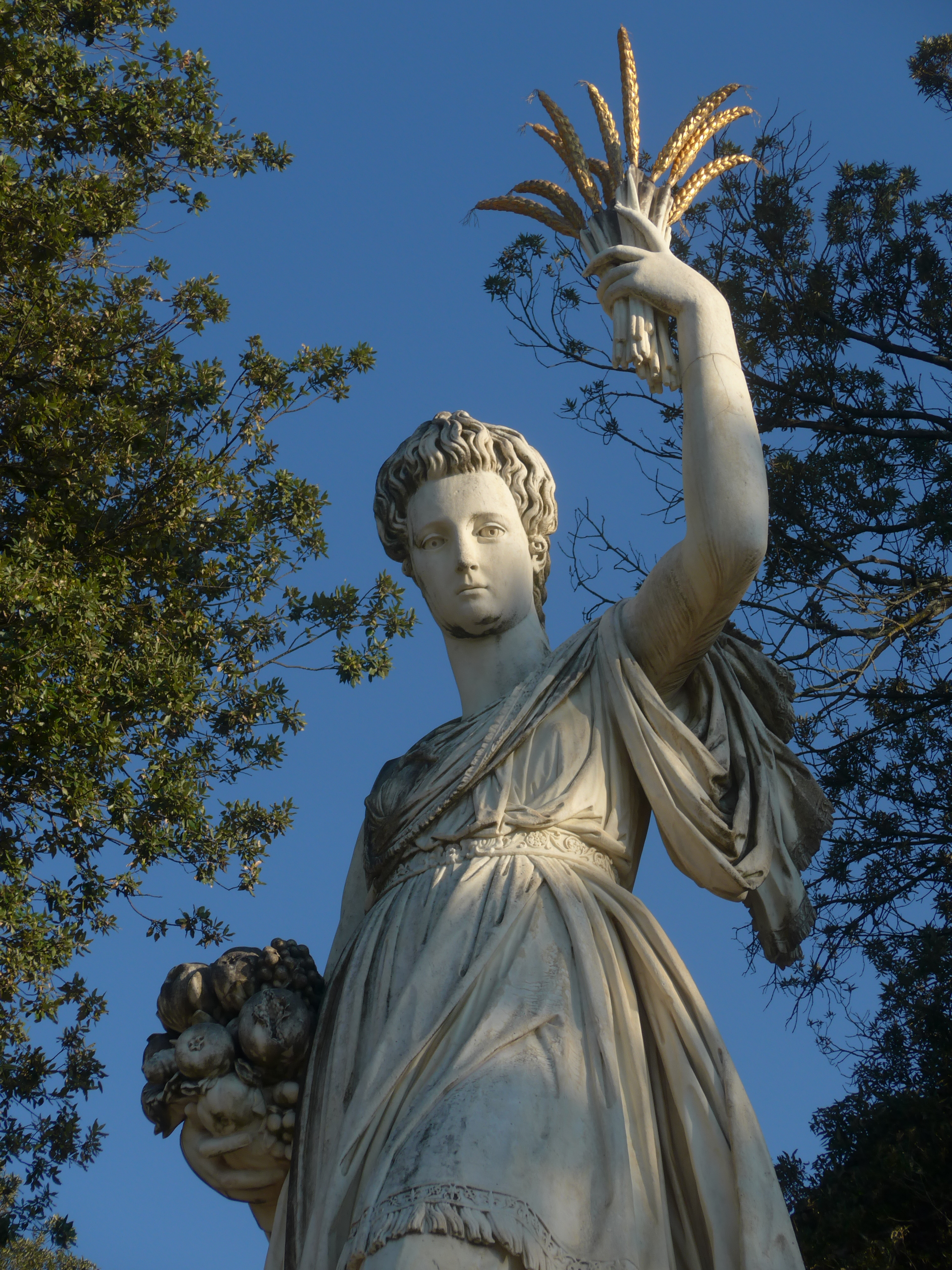
Statua dell'Abbondanza, Boboli Gardens, Florence.

Two bronze fountains originally destined for Livorno (c. 1629), still in a highly Mannerist style indebted to Flemish Mannerist goldsmith's work for their grotesque masks and shellwork textures, were set up instead in Piazza della SS. Annunziata, Florence. For Giambologna's equestrian statue of Cosimo de' Medici in the Piazza della Signoria, Tacca contributed the bas-relief panels on its base.

Taking his inspiration from a famous marble copy of a Hellenistic marble boar (Il Cinghiale) in the ducal collection at the Uffizi, Tacca set himself the task of surpassing it: the result is the Porcellino (1612) of the Mercato Nuovo, Florence. A replica sits outside Sydney Hospital.

For Madrid, Tacca executed Giambologna's equestrian bronze of Philip III (1616), which was moved in the 19th century to the city's Plaza Mayor. For Paris, by order of Marie de Medici he finished Giambologna's equestrian Henry IV (inaugurated August 23, 1613), which stood at the center of the Pont-Neuf but was destroyed in 1792 during the Revolution, then replaced with the present sculpture at the Restauration.

Tacca's last public commission was the colossal equestrian bronze of Philip IV, after a design by Velázquez. It is also said to have been based on the iconography of a lost painting by Rubens; it was begun in 1634 and shipped to Madrid in 1640, the year of his death. The sculpture, atop a complicated fountain composition, forms the centerpiece of the façade of the Royal Palace. The daring stability of the statue was calculated by Galileo Galilei: the horse rears, and the entire weight of the sculpture balances on the two rear legs—and, discreetly, its tail— a feat that had never been attempted in a figure on a heroic scale, of which Leonardo had dreamed.

His son Ferdinando Tacca assisted him in the atelier; the inventory (1687) after his death included sculptures doubtless by Pietro Tacca . The studio was taken over by Giovanni Battista Foggini upon the death of Ferdinando in Florence.

== Works in museum collections ==
- Bargello, Florence: a representative selection of his small bronzes of animals
- J. Paul Getty Museum: Two putti holding shields, 1650–55
- Hermitage, St Petersburg: Boy blowing a horn c. 1620
- Fine Arts Museums of San Francisco: Slave (18th century reduction)
- National Gallery, Washington DC: Several bronzes attributed to Pietro Tacca in the Robert H. Smith Collection (Checklist, 2002; pdf file)
- Liechtenstein Museum, Vienna: Heracles Supporting the World from the collection of Louis XIV
- Frick Collection, New York: Nessus and Deianira after a model by Giambologna, now attributed to Pietro Tacca

== See also ==
- Antonio Susini, another collaborator of Giambologna.
