= Piazza dei Miracoli =

Historic architectural complex and UNESCO World Heritage site in Pisa, Italy

Piazza del Duomo, Pisa
UNESCO World Heritage Site
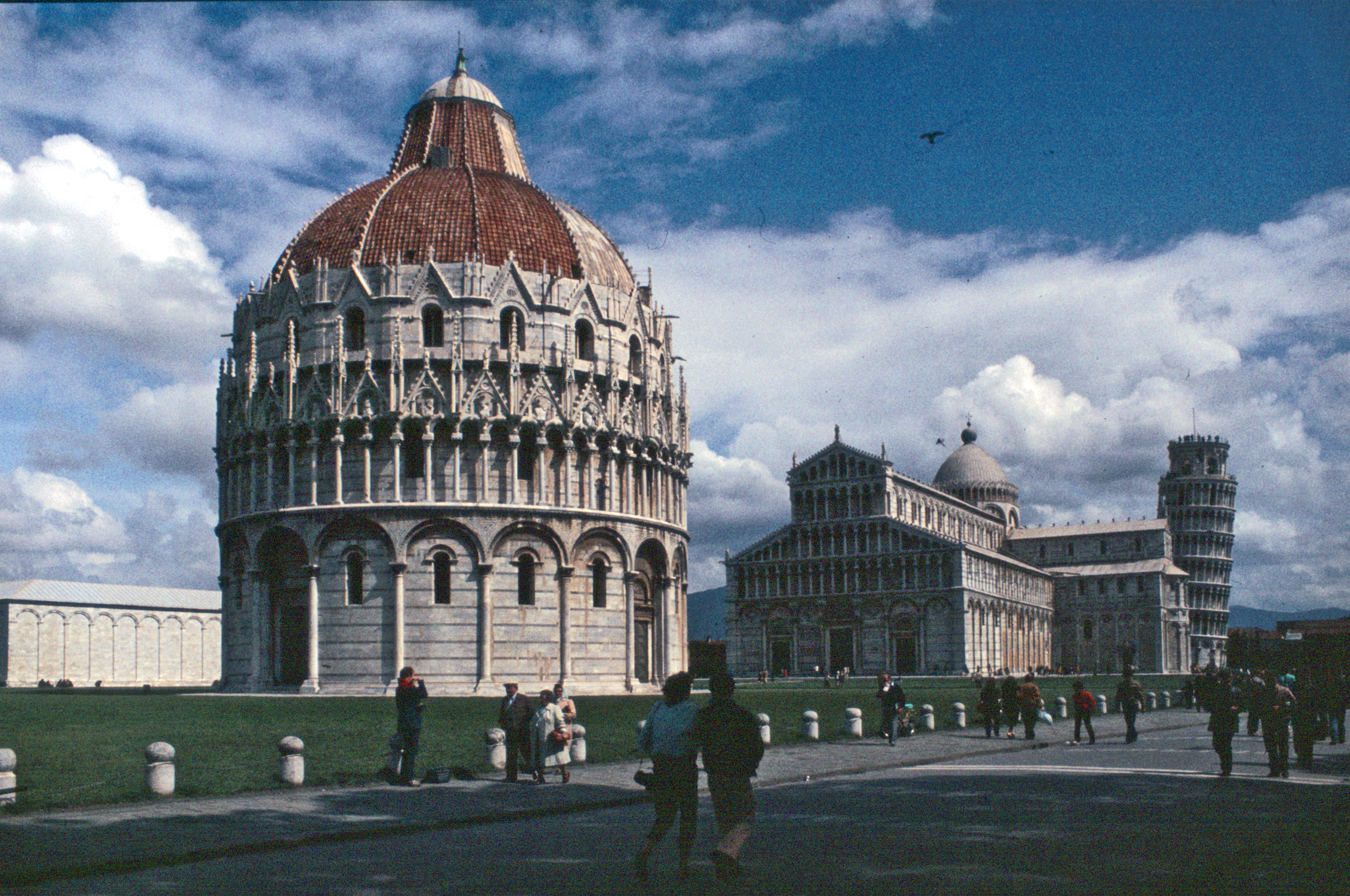
- The Baptistry in the foreground, the Duomo and the Campanile in the background

- Location within Italy
- Location: Pisa, Tuscany, Italy
- Includes: Baptistery, Leaning Tower, Cathedral and Camposanto Monumentale
- Criteria: Cultural: (i), (ii), (iv), (vi)
- Reference: 395
- Inscription: 1987 (11th Session)
- Area: 8.87 ha (21.9 acres)
- Buffer zone: 254 ha (630 acres)
- Coordinates: 43°43′23″N 10°23′47″E

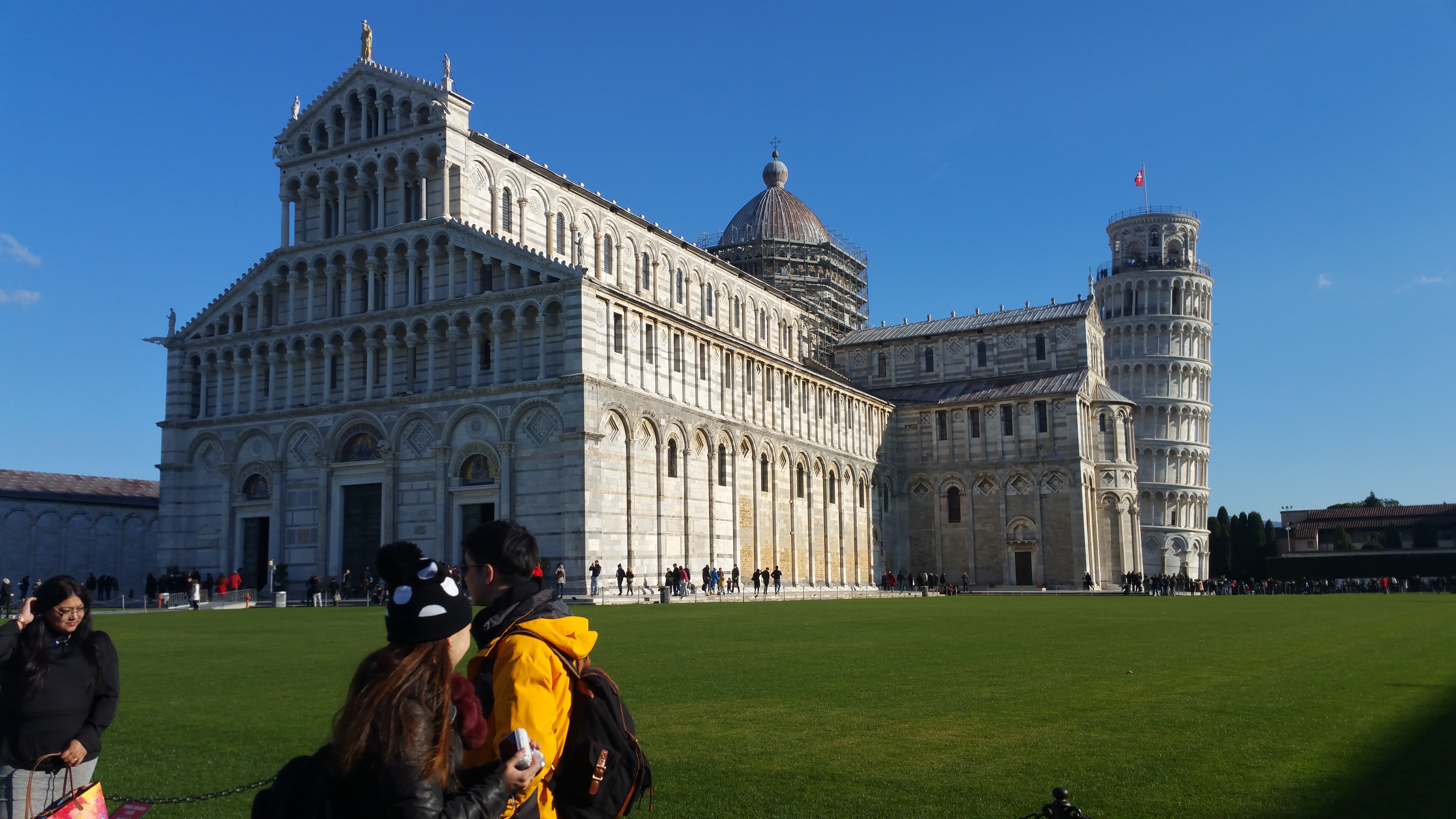
Piazza dei Miracoli

The Piazza dei Miracoli (Italian: [ˈpjattsa dei miˈraːkoli]; 'Square of Miracles'), formally known as Piazza del Duomo ('Cathedral Square'), is a walled 8.87-hectare (21.9-acre) compound in central Pisa, Tuscany, Italy, recognized as an important center of European medieval art and one of the finest architectural complexes in the world. It was all owned by the Catholic Church and is dominated by four great religious edifices: Pisa Cathedral, the Pisa Baptistery, the Leaning Tower of Pisa (the cathedral's campanile or bell tower), and the Camposanto Monumentale ('Monumental Cemetery'). Partly paved and partly grassed, the Piazza dei Miracoli is also the site of the Ospedale Nuovo di Santo Spirito ('New Hospital of the Holy Spirit'), which now houses the Sinopias Museum (Museo delle Sinopie) and the Cathedral Museum (Museo dell'Opera del Duomo).

The square's popular name was coined by the Italian writer and poet Gabriele D'Annunzio who, in his novel Forse che sì forse che no (1910), described the square as the "prato dei Miracoli", or 'meadow of miracles'. It is also sometimes called the Campo dei Miracoli ('Field of Miracles'). In 1987, the whole square was declared a UNESCO World Heritage Site.

== Cathedral ==
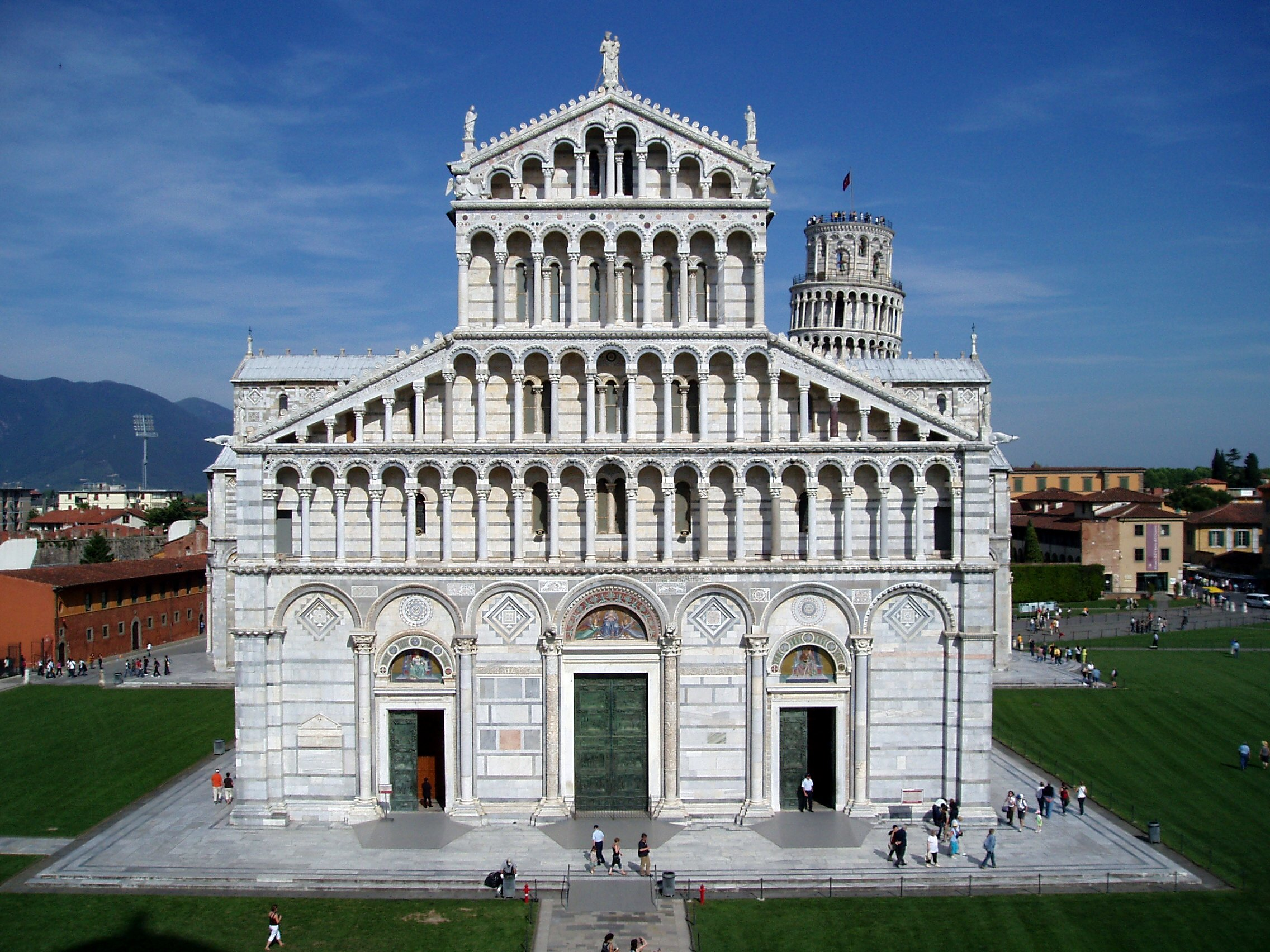
Pisa Cathedral façade

The Piazza del Duomo is dominated by Pisa Cathedral (the Duomo), the medieval cathedral of the Archdiocese of Pisa, dedicated to Santa Maria Assunta (Saint Mary of the Assumption). The cathedral has two aisles on either side of the nave. The transept consists of three aisles. The church is known also as the Primatial, the archbishop of Pisa having been a Primate since 1092.

Its construction began in 1064 to the designs of the architect Buscheto. It set the model for the distinctive Pisan Romanesque style of architecture. The mosaics of the interior, as well as the pointed arches, show a strong Byzantine influence.

The façade, of grey marble and white stone set with discs of coloured marble, was built by a master named Rainaldo, as indicated by an inscription above the middle door: Rainaldus prudens operator.

The massive bronze main doors were made in the workshops of Giambologna, replacing the original doors destroyed in a fire in 1595. The original central door was of bronze, executed around 1180 by Bonanno Pisano, while the other two were probably of wood. However, worshippers have never used the façade doors to enter, instead entering by way of the Porta di San Ranieri (Saint Ranieri's Door), in front of the Leaning Tower, built around 1180 by Bonanno Pisano.

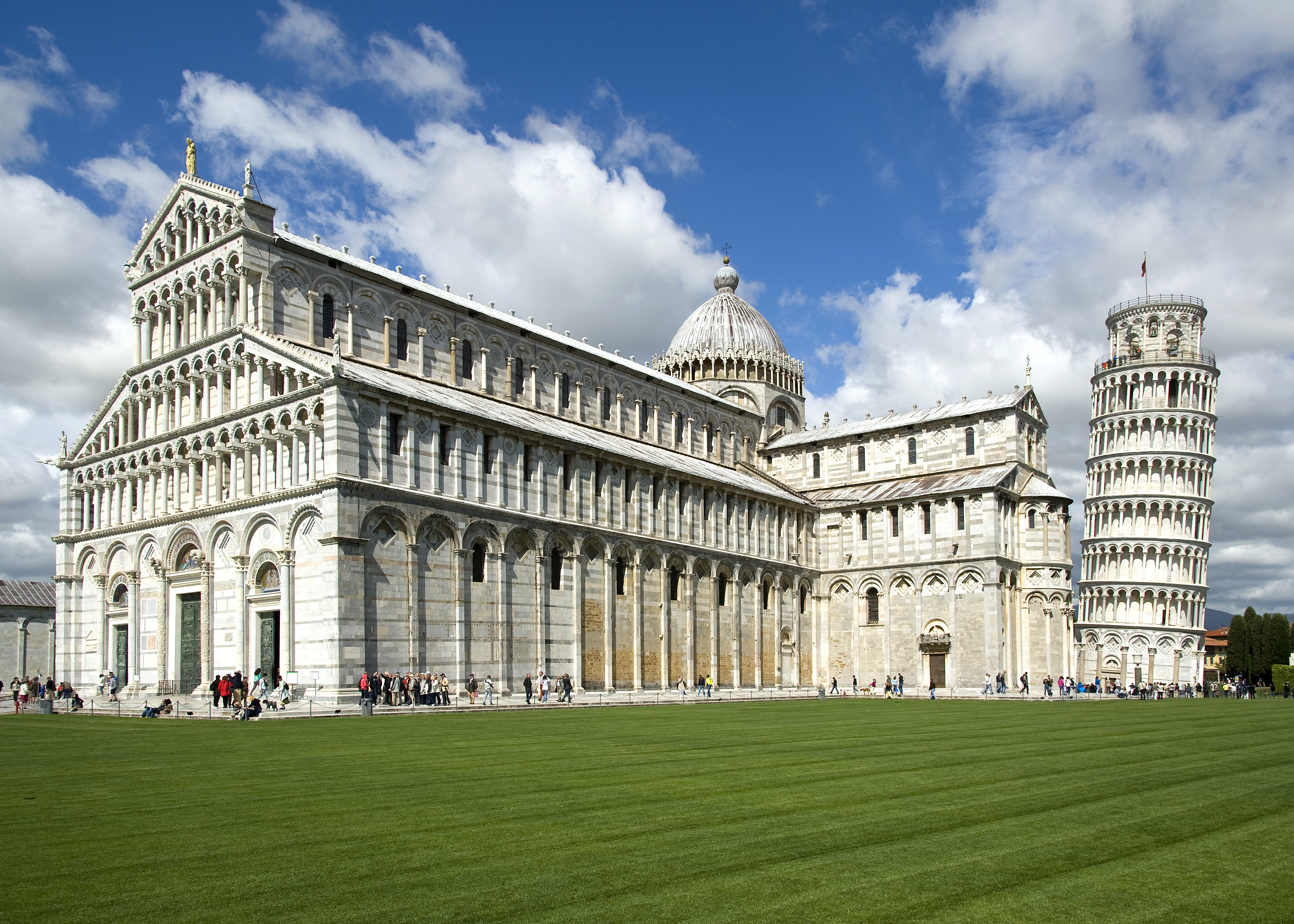
Pisa Cathedral with the Leaning Tower of Pisa

Above the doors are four rows of open galleries with, on top, statues of the Madonna with Child and, on the corners, the Four Evangelists.

Also in the façade is found the tomb of Buscheto (on the left side) and an inscription about the foundation of the cathedral and the victorious battle against the Saracens.

At the east end of the exterior, high on a column rising from the gable, is a modern replica of the Pisa Griffin, the largest known Islamic metal sculpture, the original of which was placed there probably in the 11th or 12th century, and is now in the Cathedral Museum.

The interior is faced with black and white marble and has a gilded ceiling and a frescoed dome. It was largely redecorated after a fire in 1595, which destroyed most of the Renaissance artworks.

The impressive mosaic of Christ in Majesty, in the apse, flanked by the Virgin and Saint John the Evangelist, survived the fire. It evokes the mosaics in the church of Monreale, Sicily. Although it is said that the mosaic was the work of Cimabue, only the head of Saint John was executed by that artist in 1302, his last work, since he died in Pisa the same year. The cupola, at the intersection of the nave and transept, was decorated by Riminaldi showing the assumption of the Virgin.

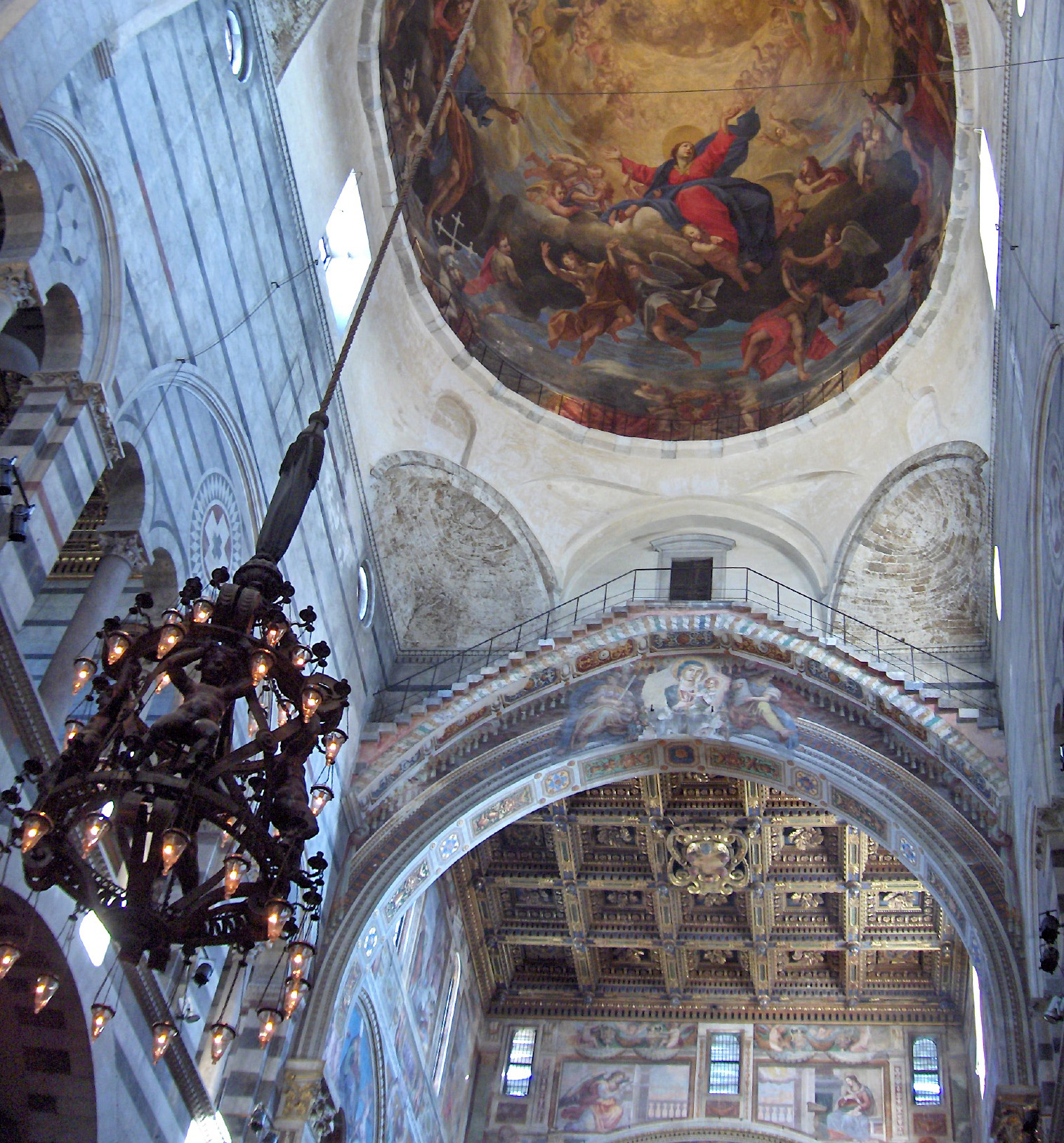
Pisa Cathedral interior and Galileo's Lamp

Galileo is believed to have formulated his theory about the movement of a pendulum by watching the swinging of the incense lamp (not the present one) hanging from the ceiling of the nave. That lamp, smaller and simpler than the present one, is now kept in the Camposanto, in the Aulla chapel.

The granite Corinthian columns between the nave and the aisle came originally from the mosque of Palermo, captured by the Pisans in 1063.

The coffered ceiling of the nave was replaced after the fire of 1595. The present gold-decorated ceiling carries the coat of arms of the Medici.

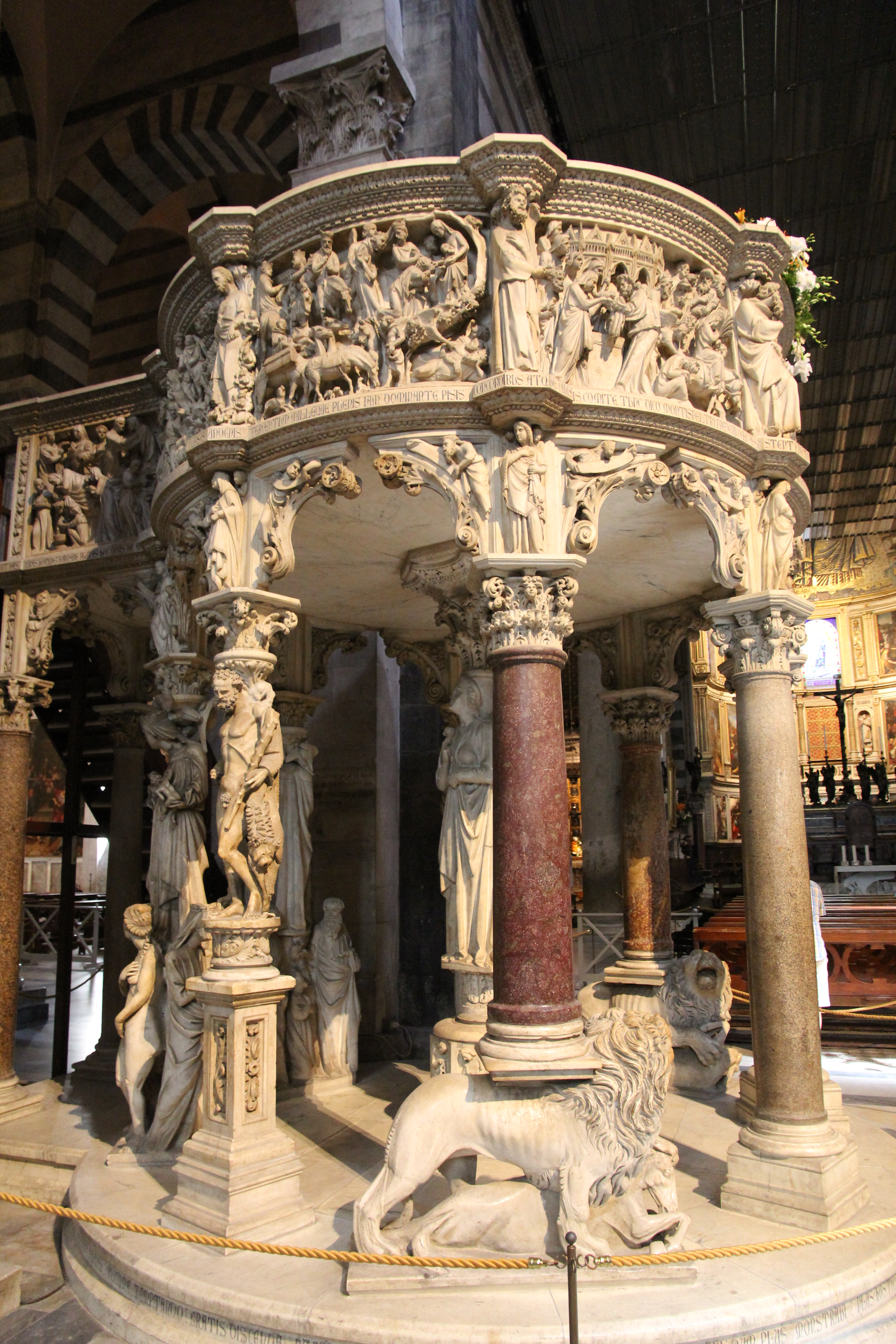
Pulpit by Giovanni Pisano

The elaborately carved pulpit (1302–1310), which also survived the fire, was executed by Giovanni Pisano, and is a masterpiece of medieval sculpture. Having been packed away during the redecoration, it was not rediscovered and restored until 1926. The pulpit is supported by plain columns (two of which are mounted on lion's sculptures) on one side and by caryatids and a telamon on the other: the latter represent Saint Michael, the Evangelists, the four cardinal virtues flanking the church, and a bold, naturalistic depiction of a naked Hercules. A central plinth with the liberal arts supports the four theological virtues.

The present-day pulpit is a reconstruction of the original. It does not lie in its original position, which was nearer the main altar, and the columns and panels are not original. The original stairs (perhaps of marble) were lost.

The upper part has nine narrative panels showing scenes from the New Testament, carved in white marble with a chiaroscuro effect and separated by figures of prophets: the Annunciation, the Massacre of the Innocents, the Nativity, Adoration of the Magi, the Flight into Egypt, the Crucifixion, and two panels of the Last Judgement.

The church also contains the bones of Saint Ranieri, Pisa's patron saint, and the tomb of Holy Roman Emperor Henry VII, carved by Tino da Camaino in 1315. That tomb, originally in the apse just behind the main altar, was disassembled and moved many times over the centuries for political reasons. While the sarcophagus is still in the cathedral, some of the statues were put in the Camposanto or at the top of the cathedral's façade. The original statues are now in the Museo dell'Opera del Duomo.

Pope Gregory VIII was also buried in the cathedral. The fire of 1595 destroyed his tomb.

The cathedral has a prominent role in determining the beginning of the Pisan New Year. Between the tenth century and 1749, when the Tuscan calendar was reformed, Pisa used its own calendar, in which the first day of the year was March 25, the feast day of the Annunciation of Mary. Years were counted such that the Pisan New Year begins nine months before the ordinary one. The exact moment is determined by a ray of sun that, through a window on the left side, falls on an egg-shaped marble, just above the pulpit by Giovanni Pisano; this occurs at noon.

Some relics brought back during the Crusades can also be found in the cathedral: alleged remains of three saints (Abibo, Gamaliel, and Nicodemus), and a vase that is said to be one of the jars of Cana.

The building, as have several in Pisa, has tilted slightly since its construction, though not nearly to the extent of the nearby Tower.

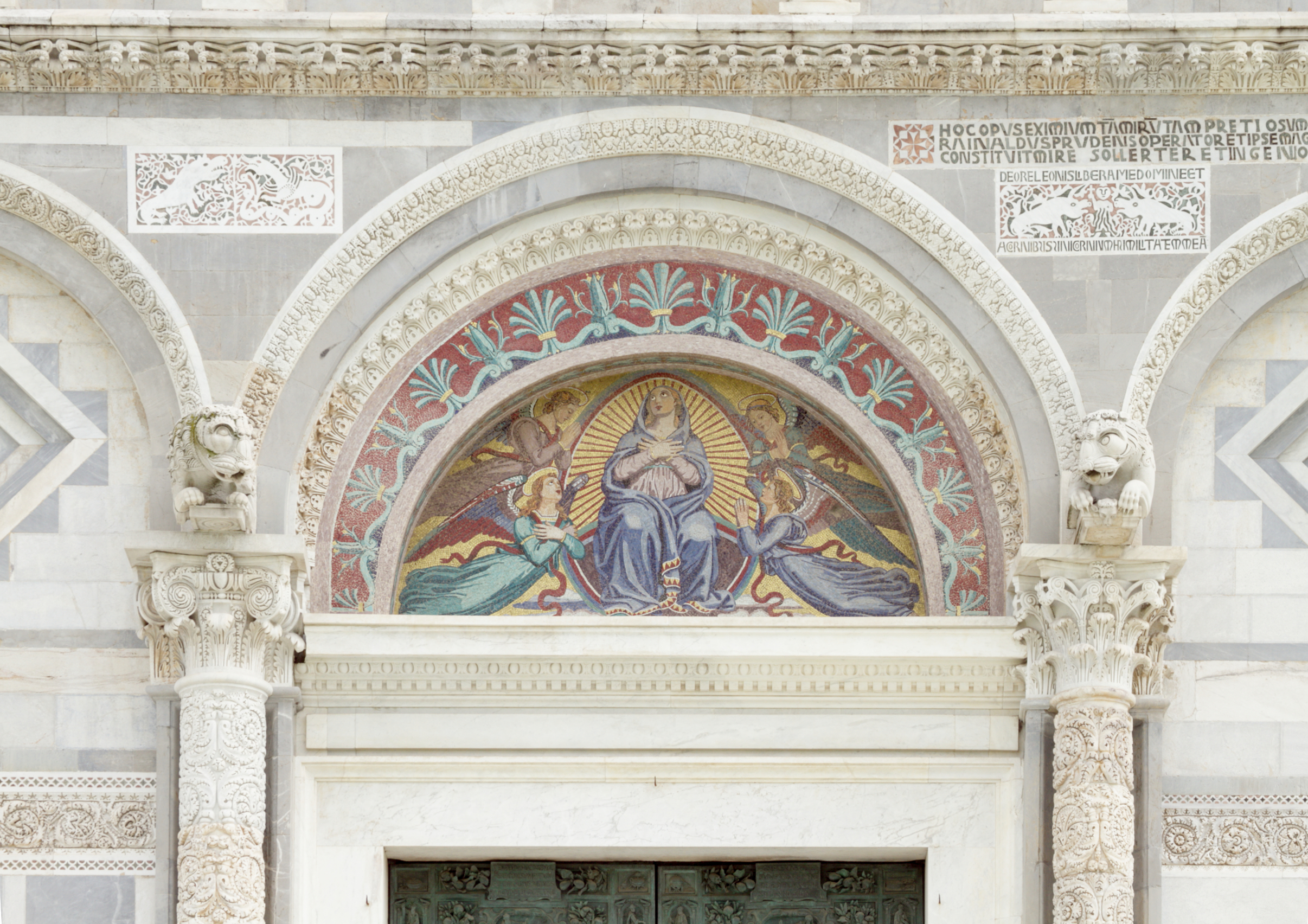
Lunette above the central door by Giuseppe Modena da Lucca, representing the Virgin Mary

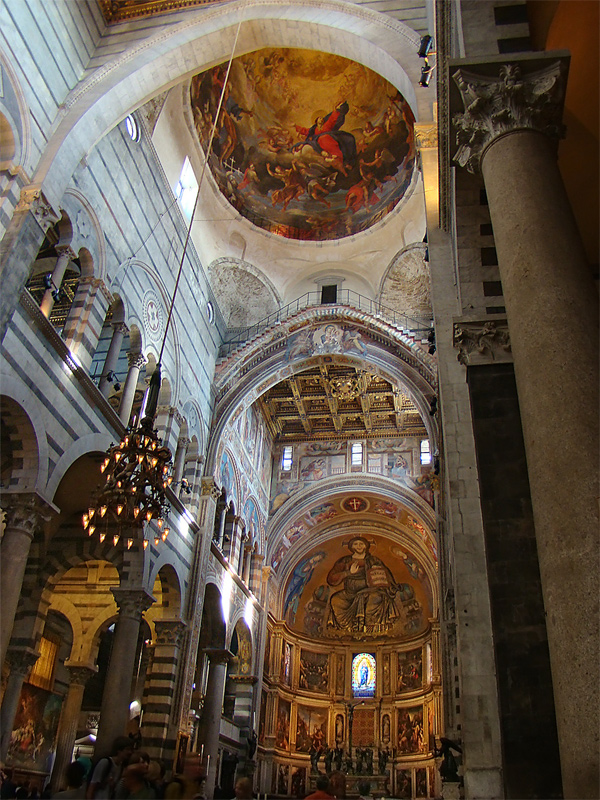
Apse with mosaic

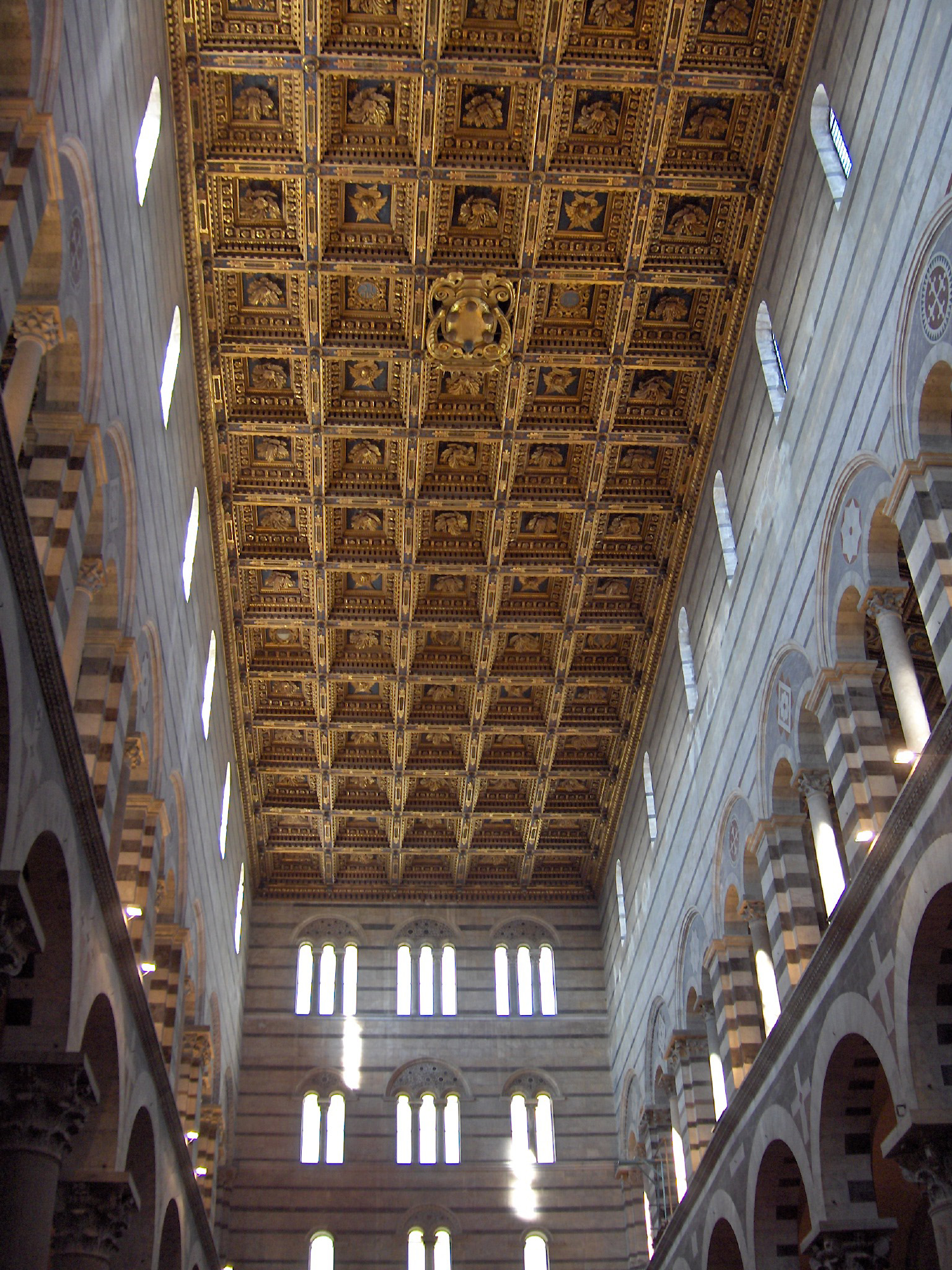
Coffered ceiling

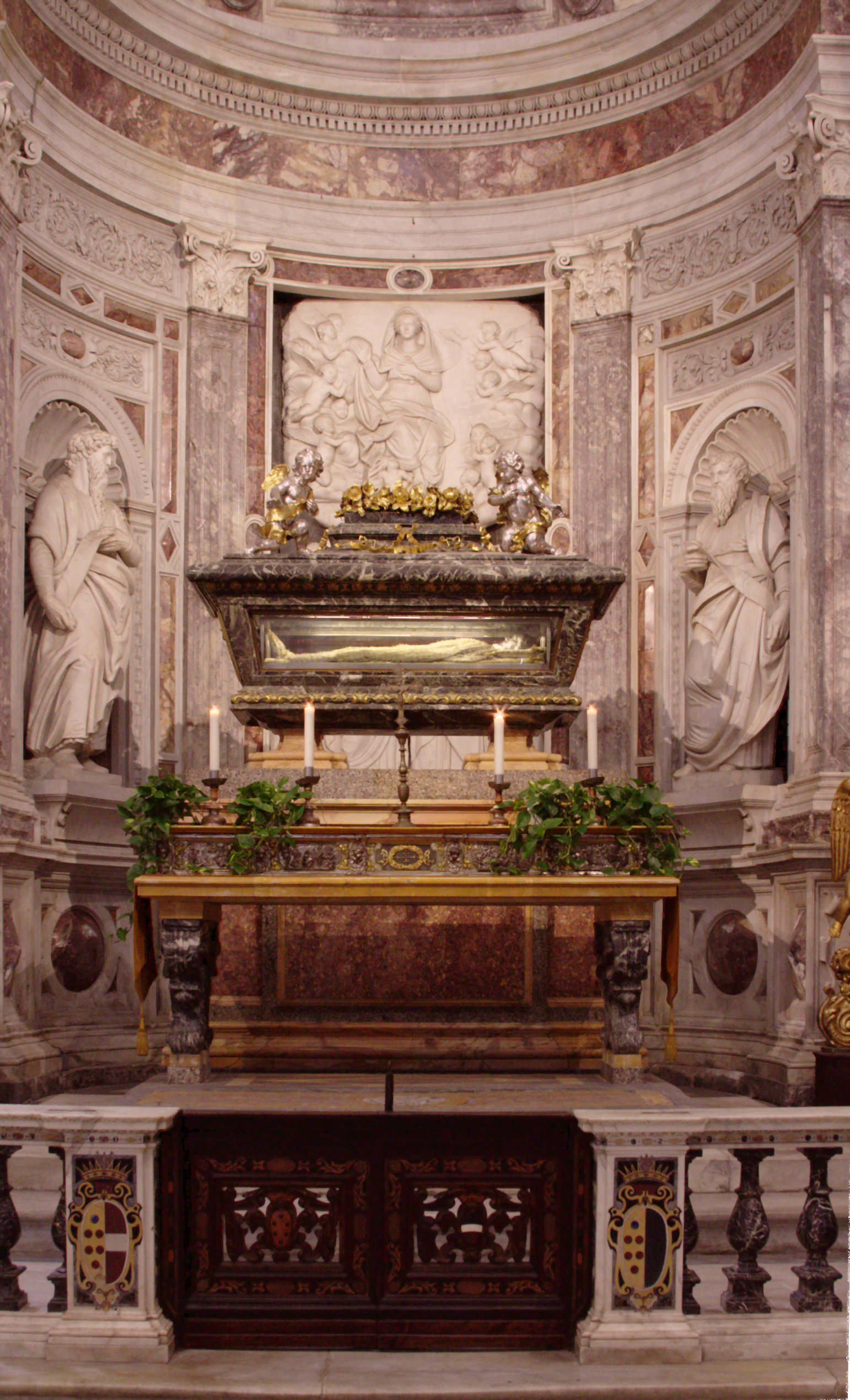
Altar of Saint Rainerius

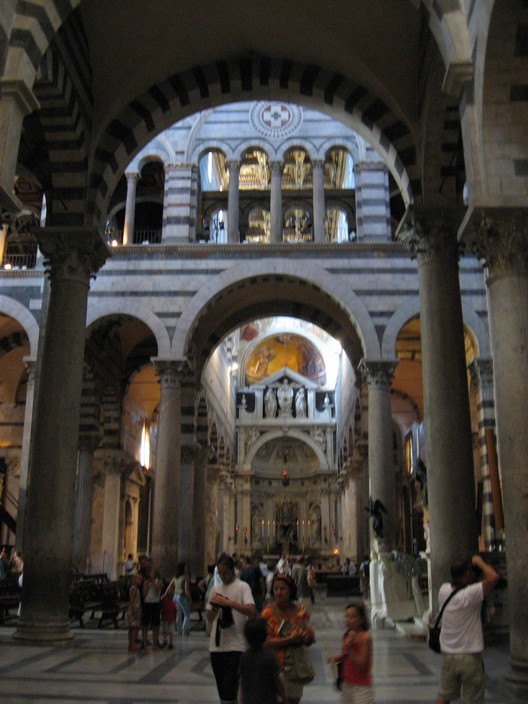
Interior view of central part

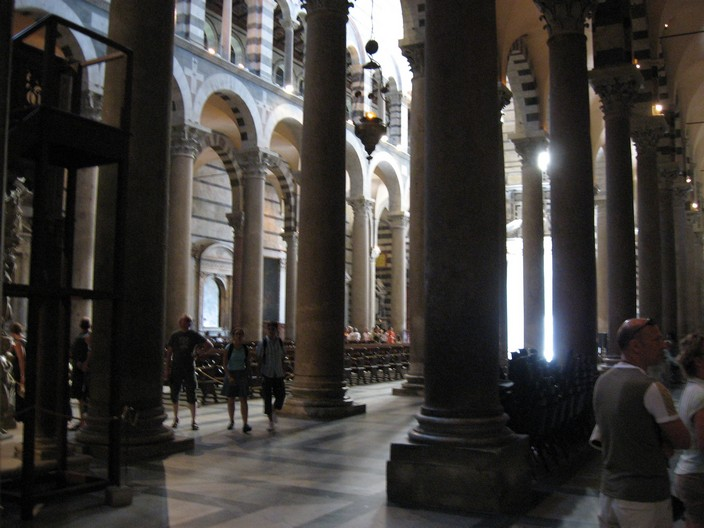
Marble columns

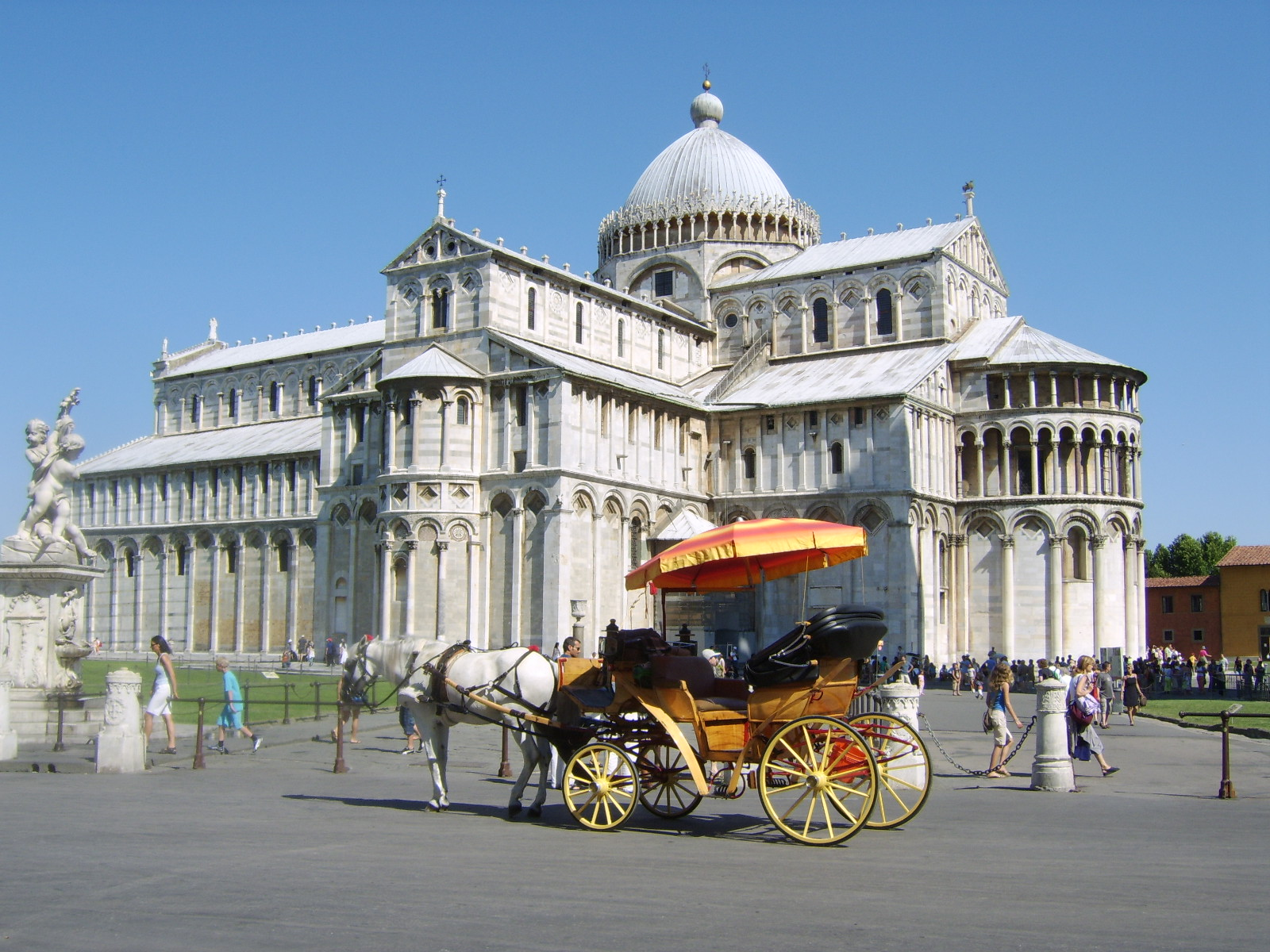
The Compound, with the Pisa Griffin high above the apse on a column

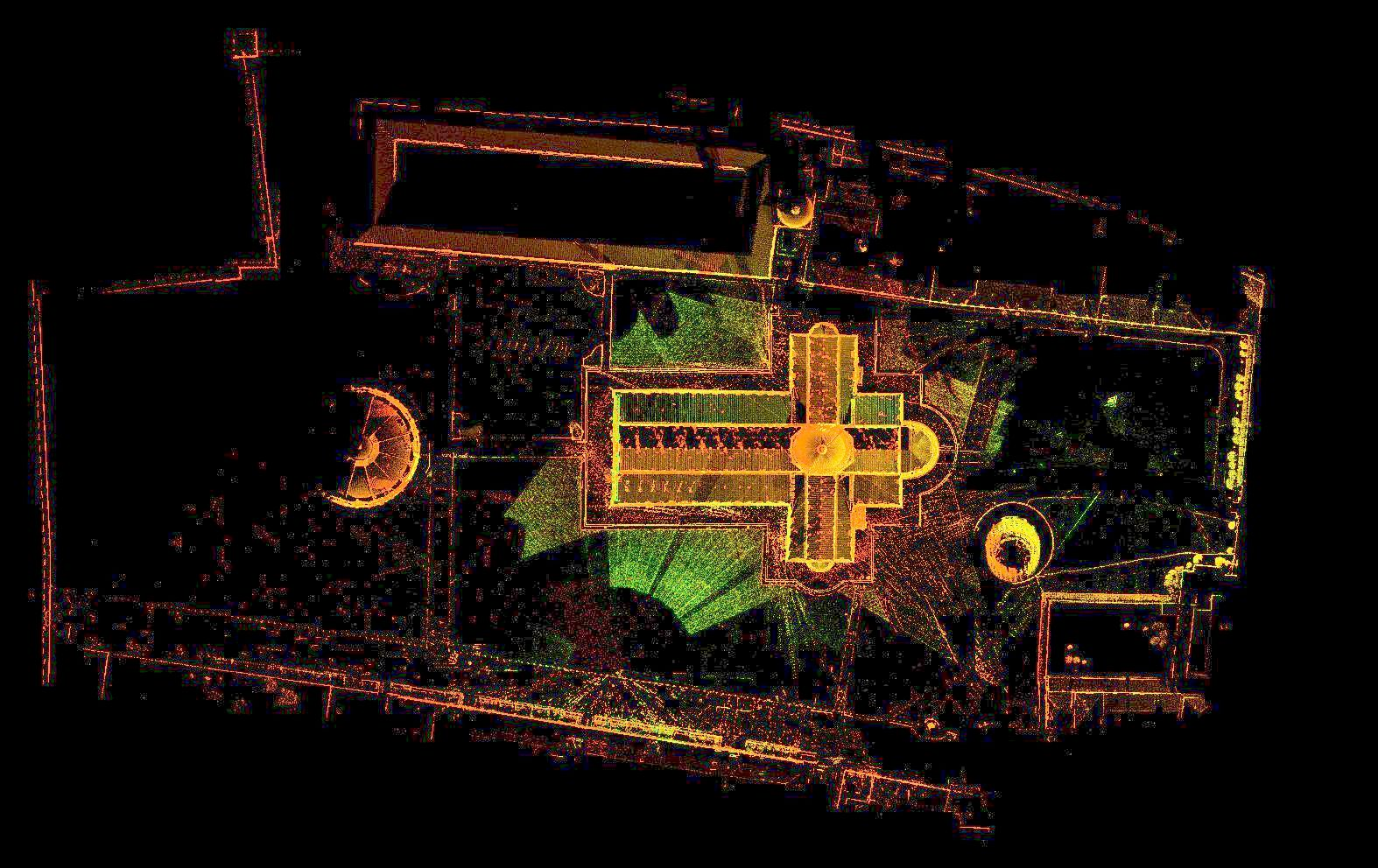
Aerial perspective of Piazza del Duomo

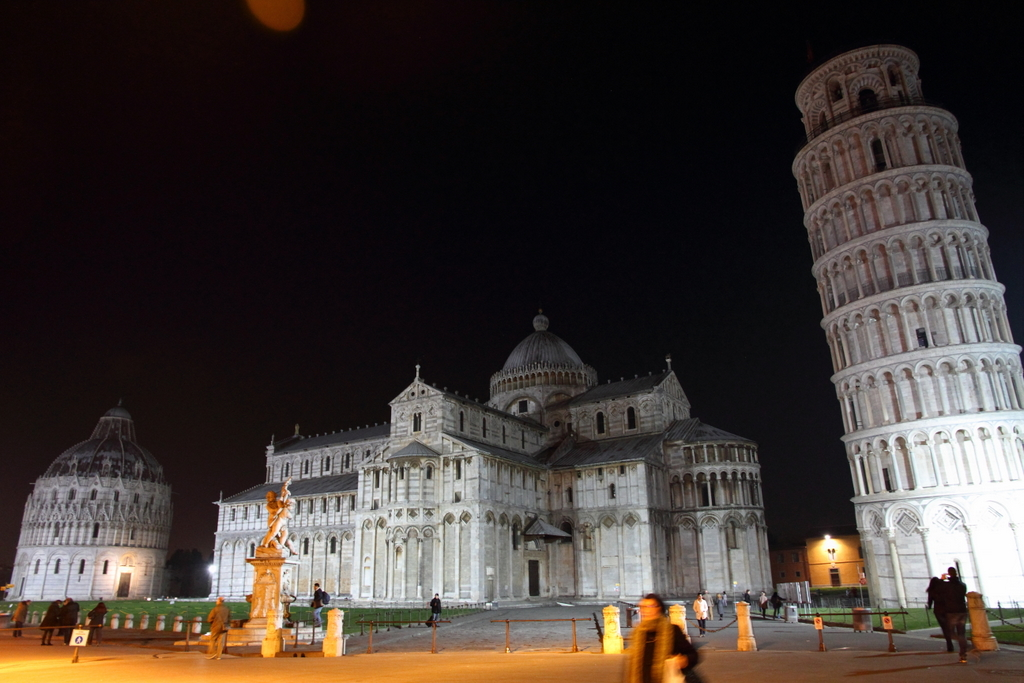
The Leaning Tower with the Duomo and Baptistery at night

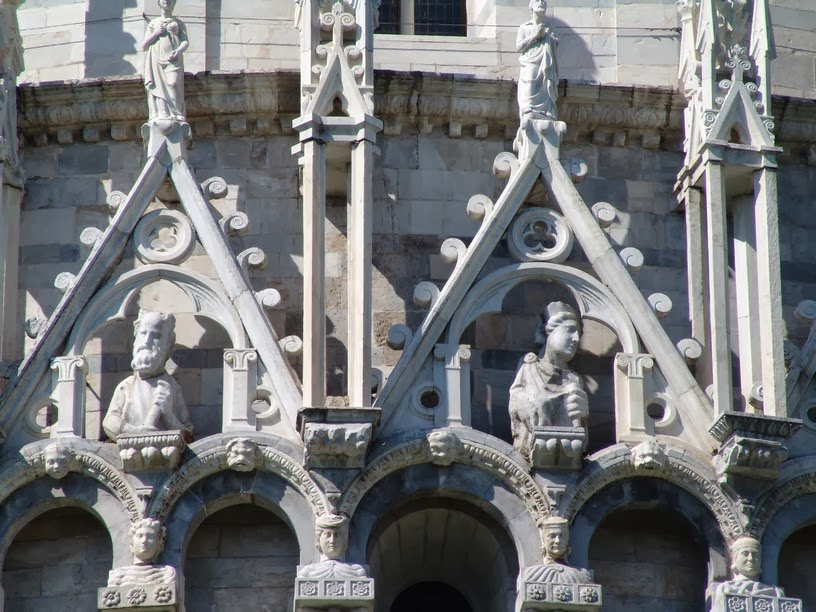
Details in Romanesque architecture style

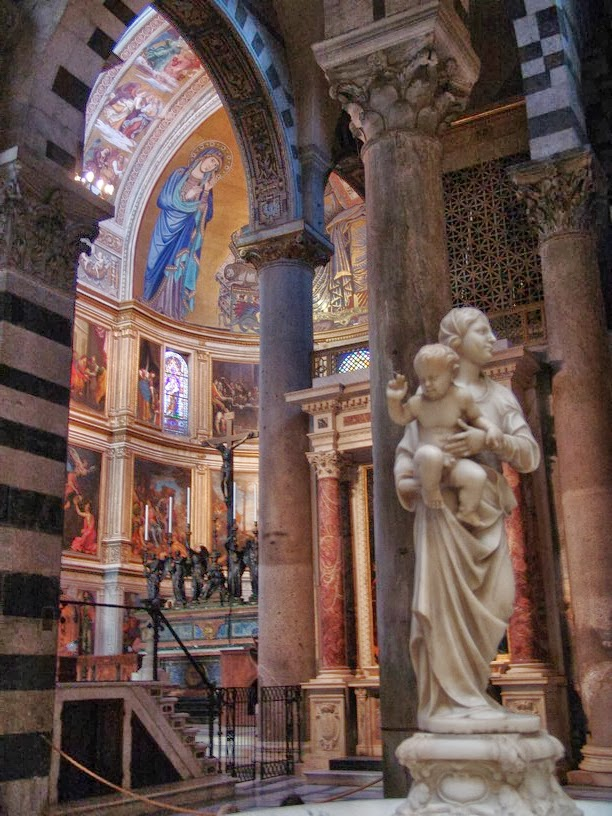
White marble statue

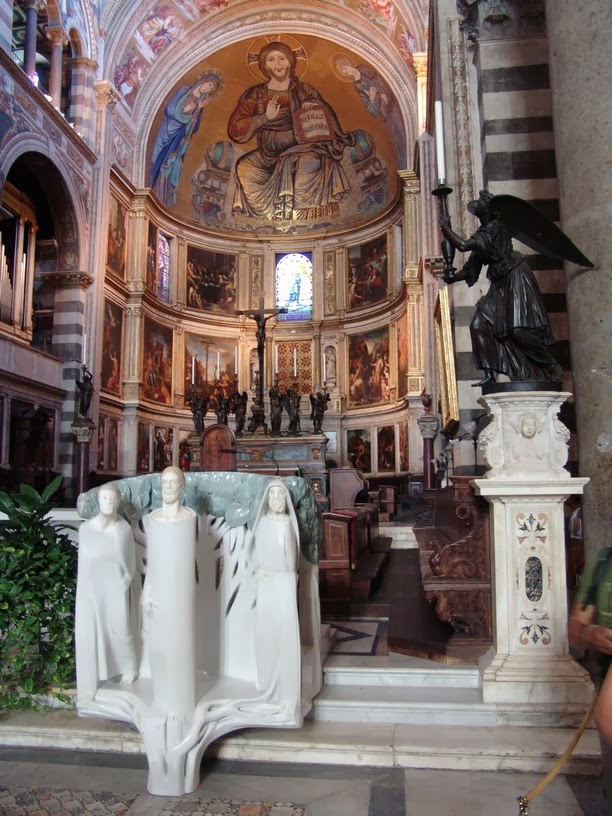
In front of the altar

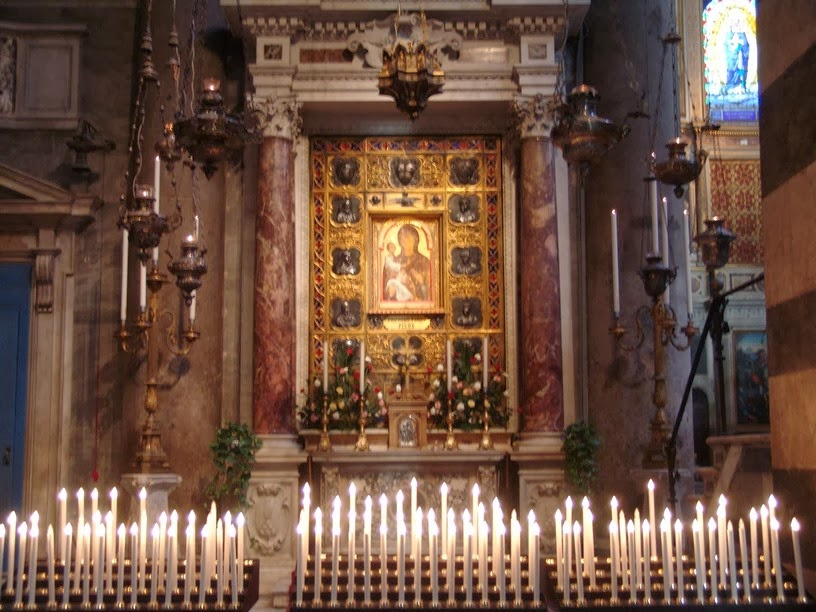
Madonna and Child

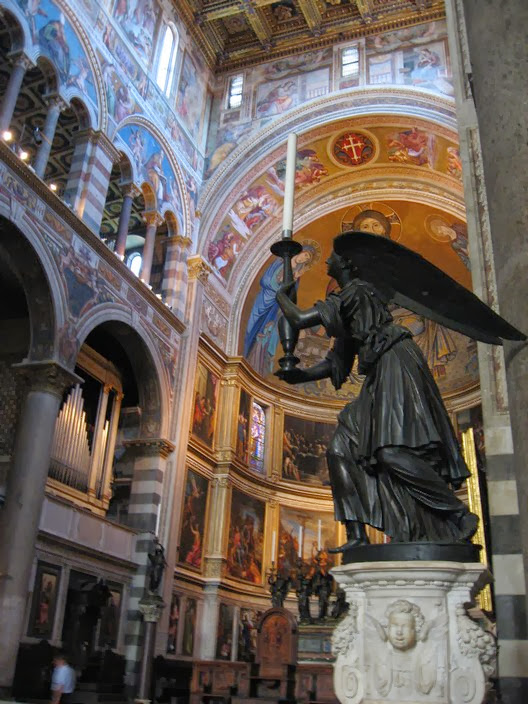
Interior view

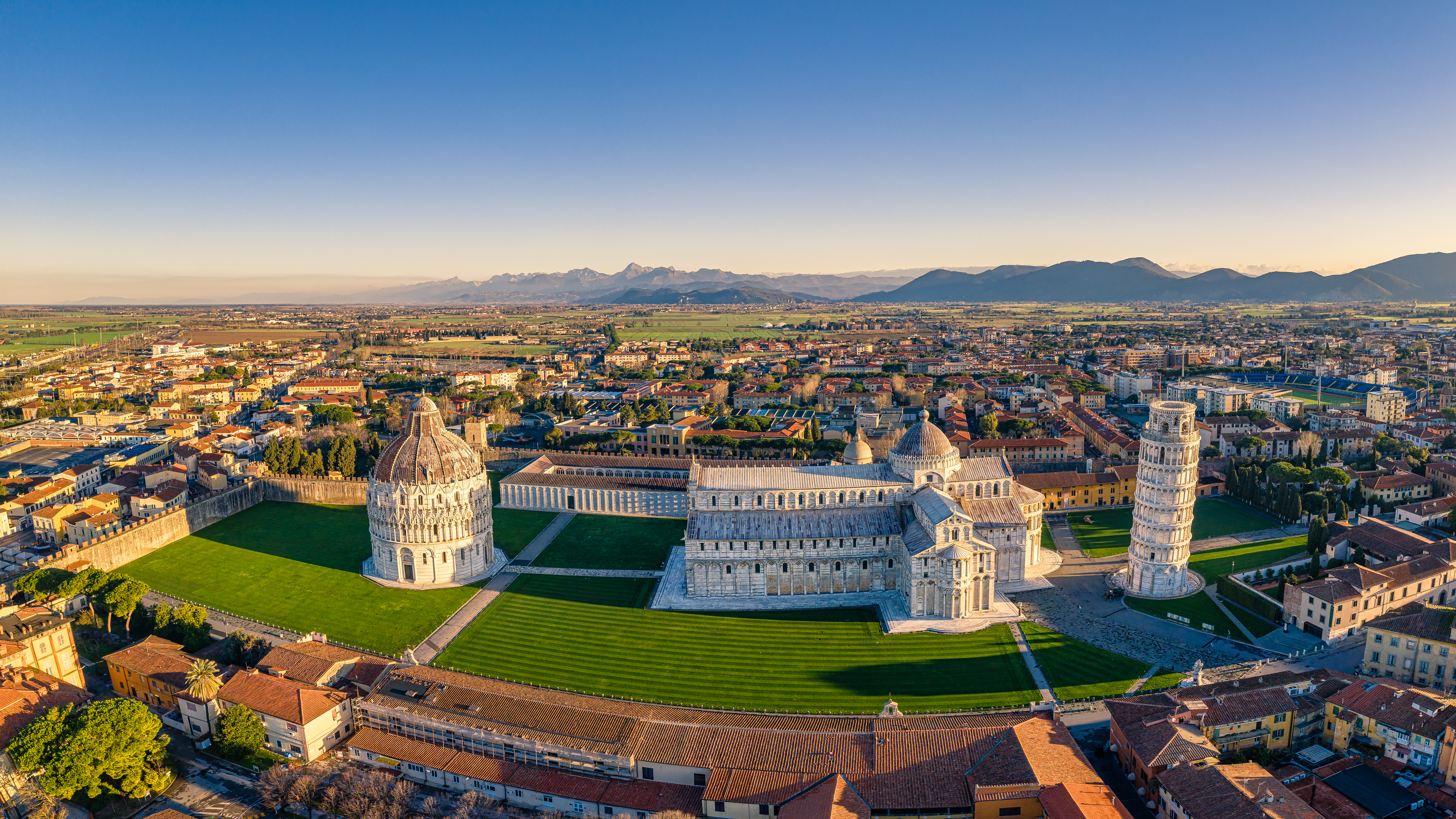
Panoramic view

== Baptistery ==
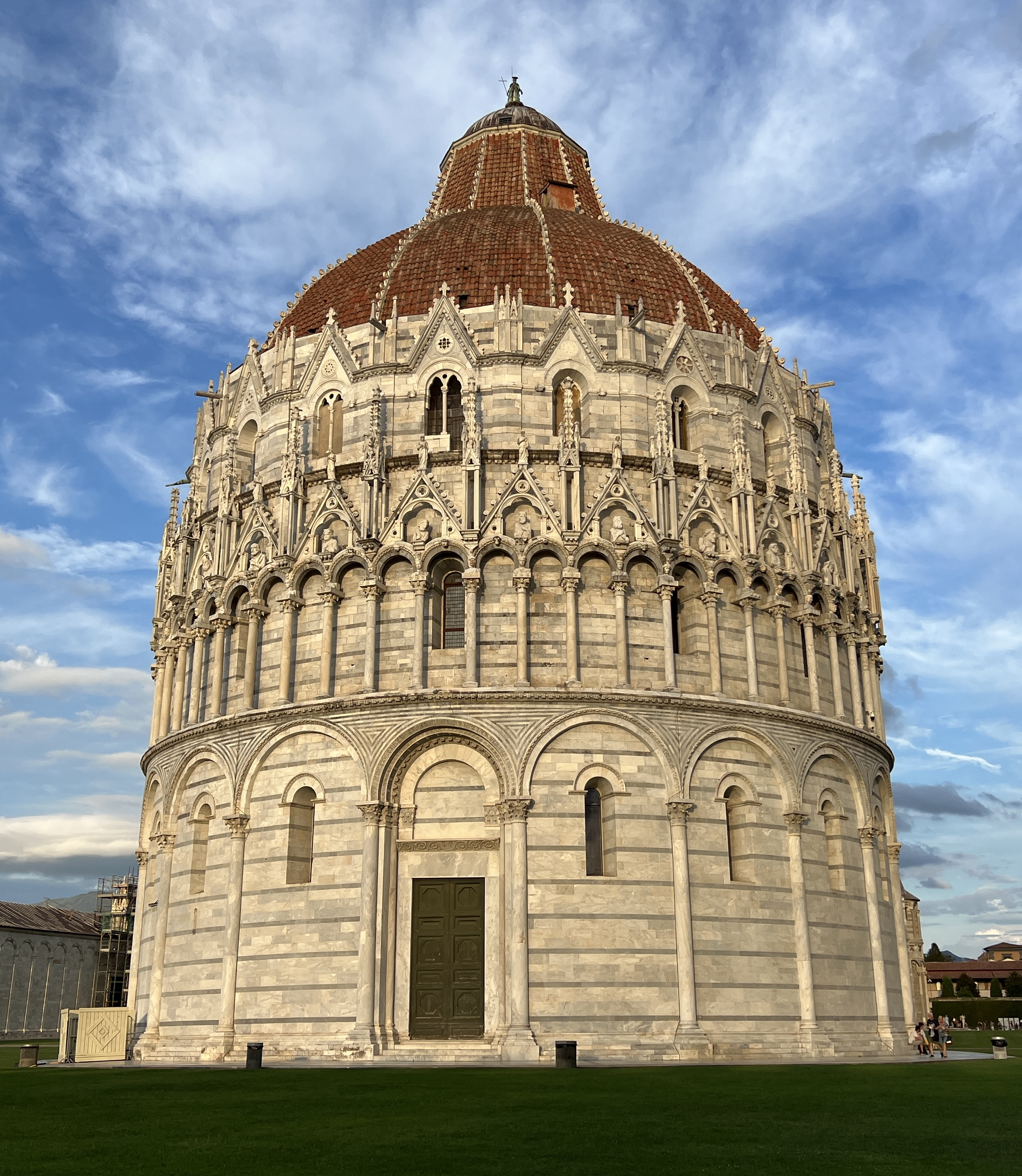
The Pisa Baptistry

The Baptistery, dedicated to St. John the Baptist, stands opposite the west end of the Duomo. The round Romanesque building was begun in the mid 12th century: 1153 Mense August fundata fuit haec ("In the month of August 1153 was set up here..."). It was built in Romanesque style by an architect known as Diotisalvi ("God Save You"), who worked also in the church of the Holy Sepulchre in the city. His name is mentioned on a pillar inside, as Diotosalvi magister. the construction was not, however, finished until the 14th century, when the loggia, the top storey and the dome were added in Gothic style by Nicola Pisano and Giovanni Pisano.

It is the largest baptistery in Italy, with a circumference measuring 107.25 m. Taking into account the statue of St. John the Baptist (attributed to Turino di Sano) atop the dome, it is even a few centimetres taller than the Leaning Tower.

The portal, facing the façade of the cathedral, is flanked by two classical columns, while the inner jambs are executed in the Byzantine style. The lintel is divided into two tiers, the lower one depicting several episodes in the life of St. John the Baptist, and the upper one showing Christ between the Madonna and St. John the Baptist, flanked by angels and the evangelists.

The immensity of the interior is overwhelming, but it is surprisingly plain and lacking in decoration. It has notable acoustics also.

The octagonal baptismal font at the centre dates from 1246 and was made by Guido Bigarelli da Como. The bronze sculpture of St. John the Baptist at the centre of the font is a remarkable work by Italo Griselli.

The famous pulpit was sculpted between 1255 and 1260 by Nicola Pisano, father of Giovanni Pisano, the artist who produced the pulpit in the Duomo. The scenes on the pulpit, and especially the classical form of the naked Hercules, show at best Nicola Pisano's abilities as the most important precursor of Italian renaissance sculpture by reinstating antique representations. Therefore, surveys of the Italian Renaissance usually begin with the year 1260, the year that Nicola Pisano dated this pulpit.

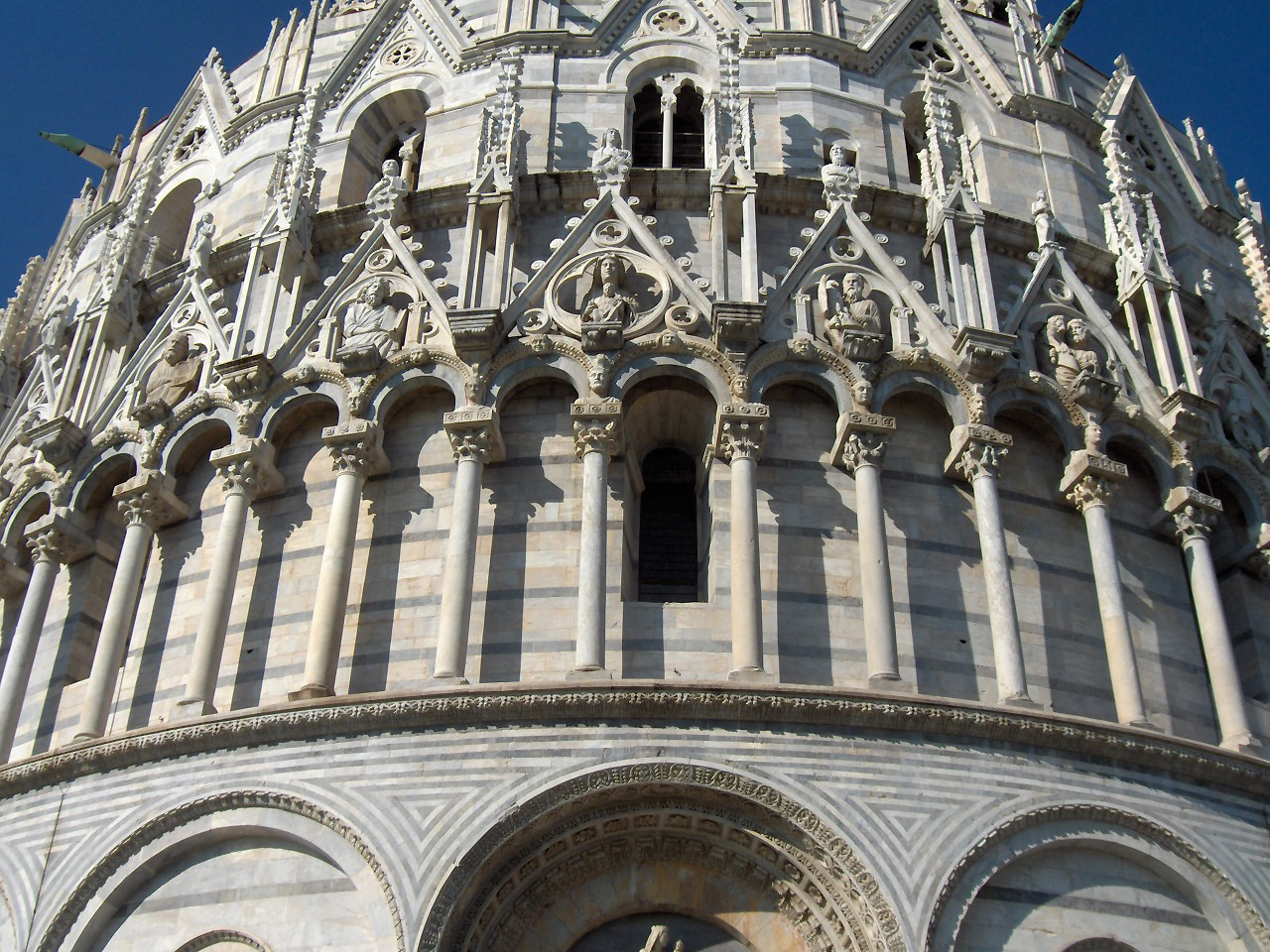
Baptistry dome

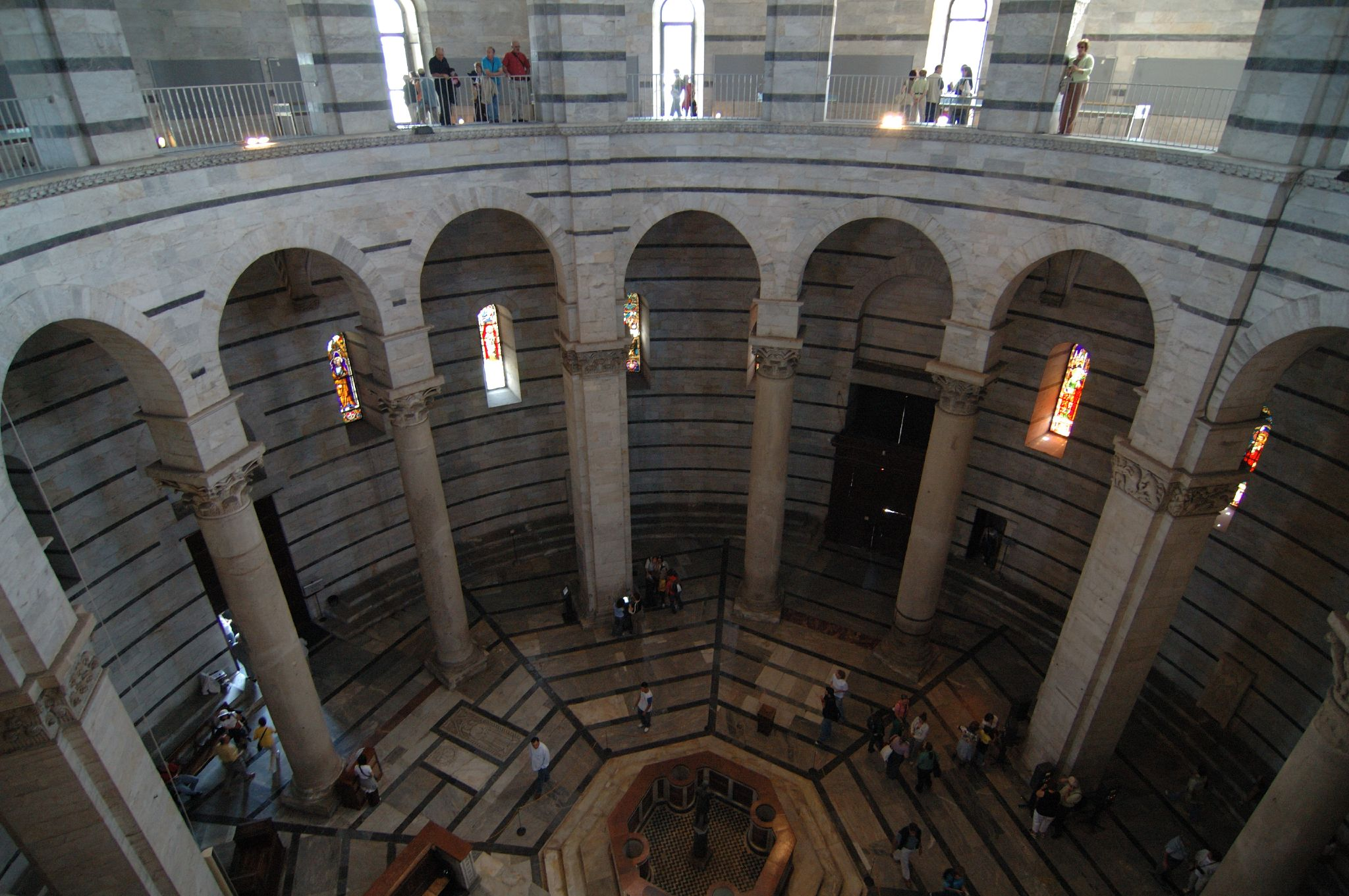
Baptistry interior

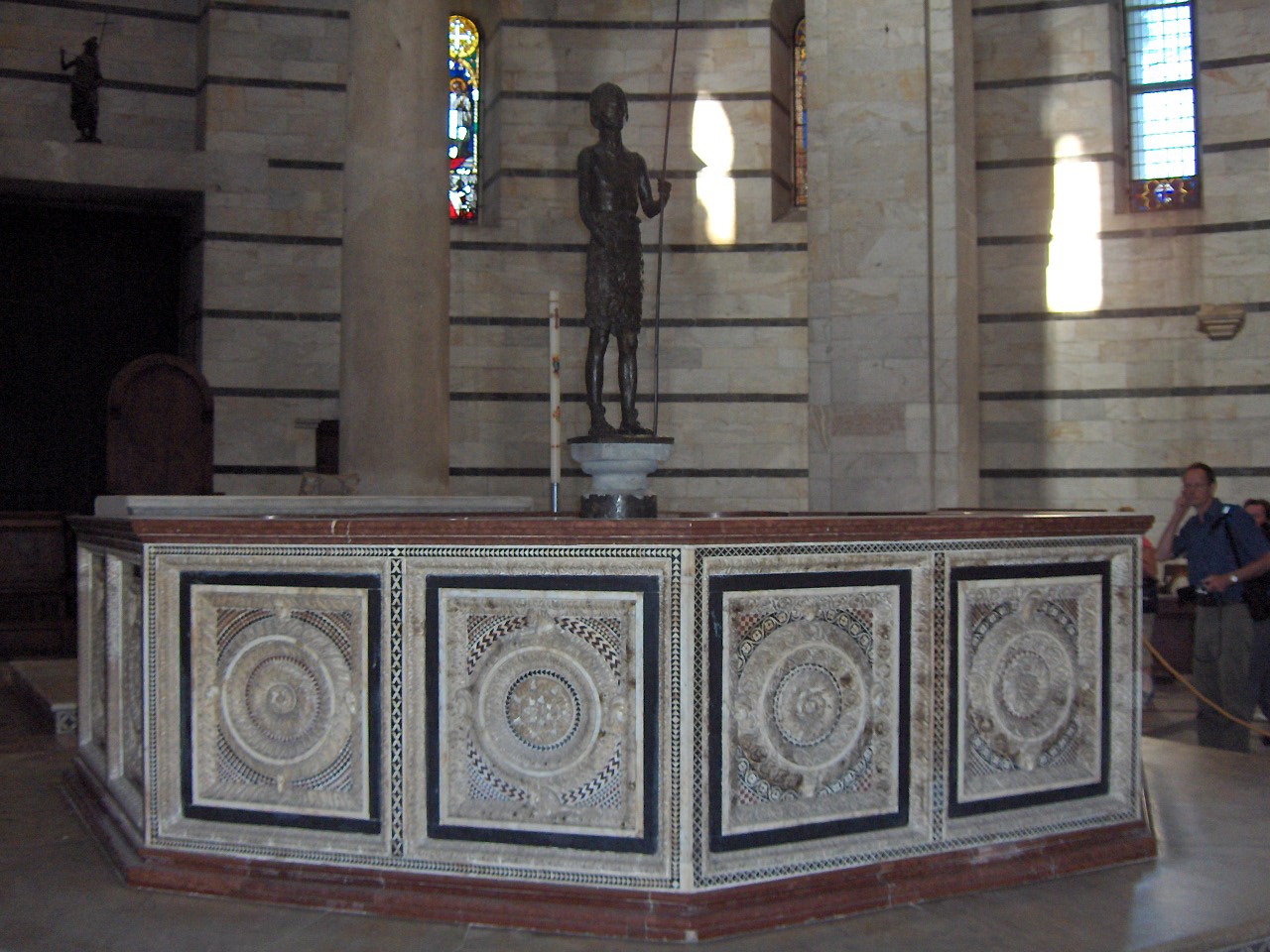
Baptistry font by Guido Bigarelli da Como

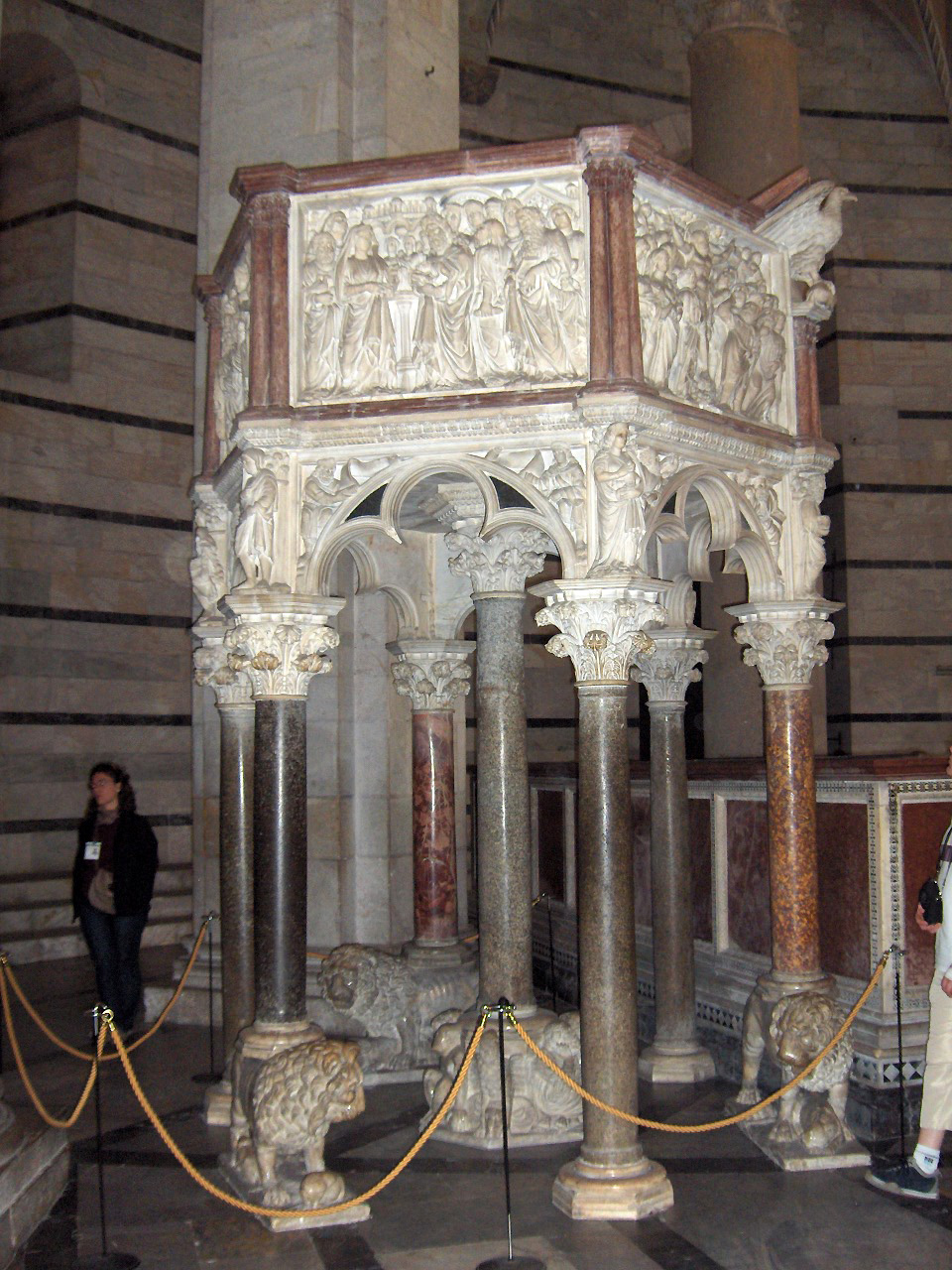
Pulpit by Nicola Pisano

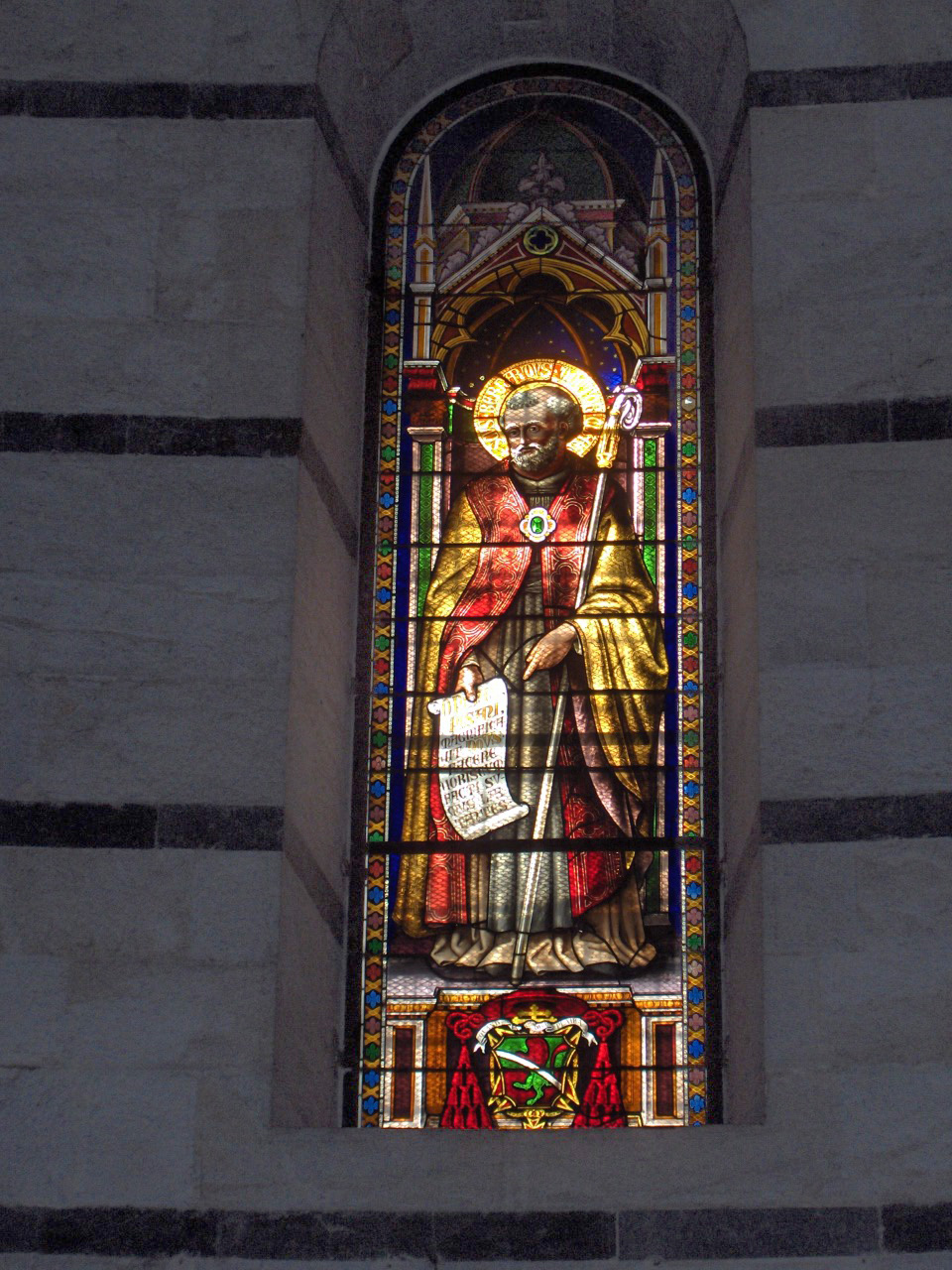
Stained-glass window

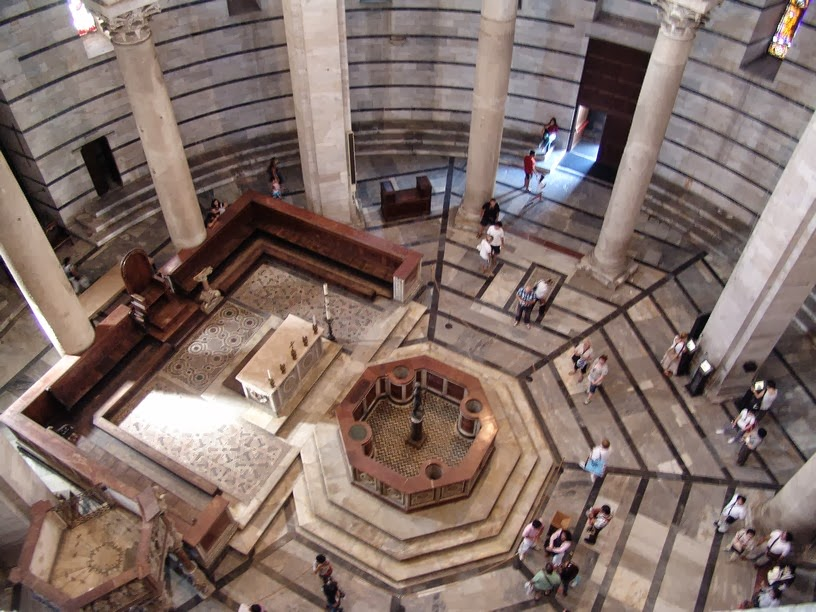
Baptistery floor

== Campanile ==
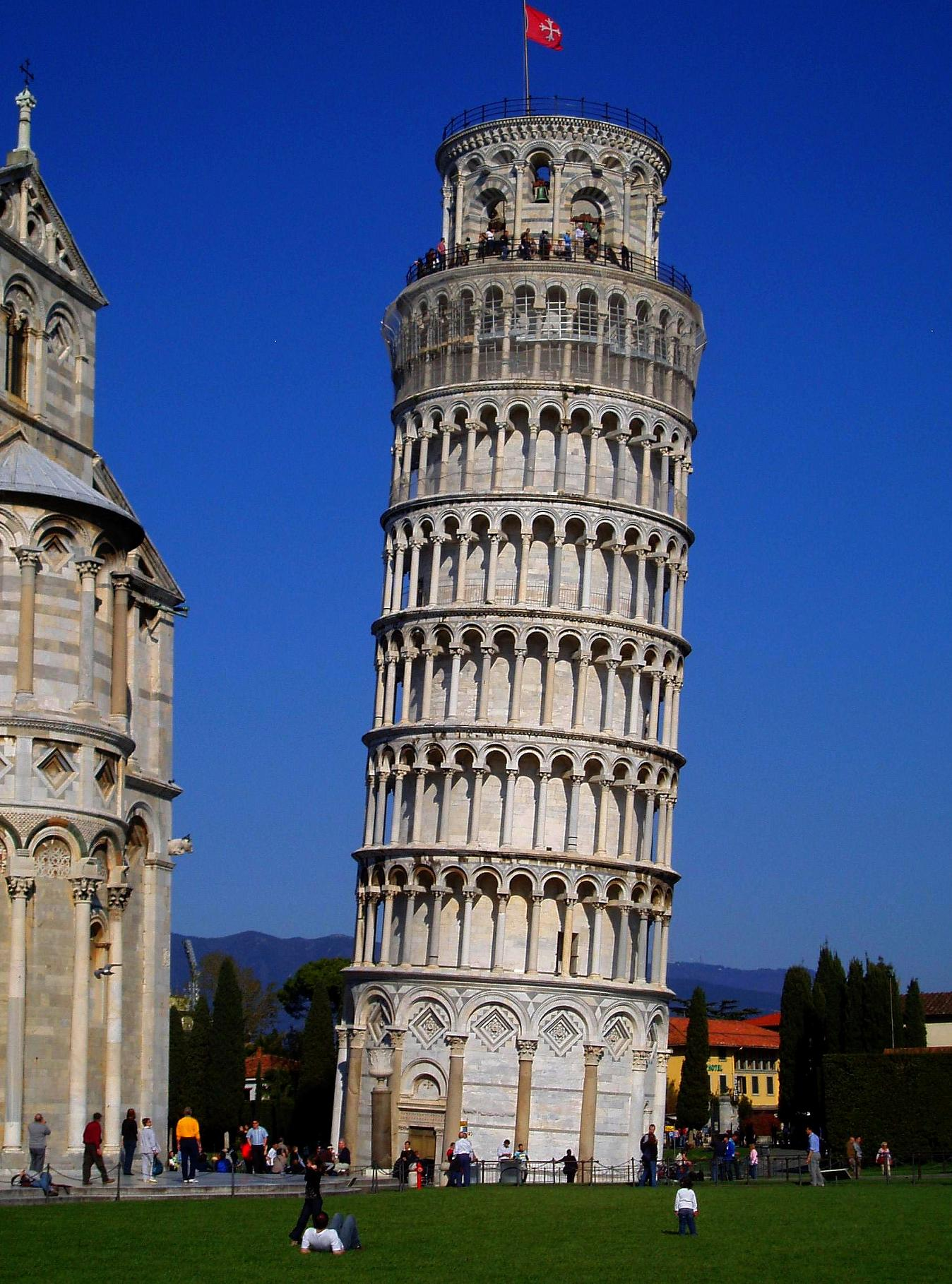
Leaning Tower of Pisa, in 2009

The campanile (bell tower), commonly known as the Leaning Tower of Pisa, is located behind the cathedral. The last of the three major buildings on the piazza to be built, construction of the bell tower began in 1173 and took place in three stages over the course of 177 years, with the bell-chamber only added in 1372. Five years after construction began, when the building had reached the third floor level, the weak subsoil and poor foundation led to the building sinking on its south side. The building was left for a century, which allowed the subsoil to stabilise itself and prevented the building from collapsing. In 1272, to adjust the lean of the building, when construction resumed, the upper floors were built with one side taller than the other. The seventh and final floor was added in 1319. By the time the building was completed, the lean was approximately 1 degree, or 80 cm (2.5 feet) from vertical. At its greatest, measured prior to 1990, the lean measured approximately 5.5 degrees. As at 2010, the lean was reduced to approximately 4 degrees.

The tower stands approximately 60 m high, and was built to accommodate a total of seven main bells, cast to the musical scale:

1. L'Assunta, cast in 1654 by Giovanni Pietro Orlandi, weight 3,620 kg (7,981 lb)
2. Il Crocifisso, cast in 1572 by Vincenzo Possenti, weight 2,462 kg (5,428 lb)
3. San Ranieri, cast in 1719–21 by Giovanni Andrea Moreni, weight 1,448 kg (3,192 lb)
4. La Terza, the first small bell, cast in 1473, weight 300 kg (661 lb)
5. La Pasquereccia or La Giustizia, cast in 1262 by Lotteringo, weight 1,014 kg (2,235 lb)
6. Il Vespruccio, the second small bell, cast in the 14th century and again in 1501 by Nicola di Jacopo, weight 1,000 kg (2,205 lb)
7. Dal Pozzo, cast in 1606 and again in 2004, weight 652 kg (1,437 lb)

There are 296 steps leading to the top of the tower.

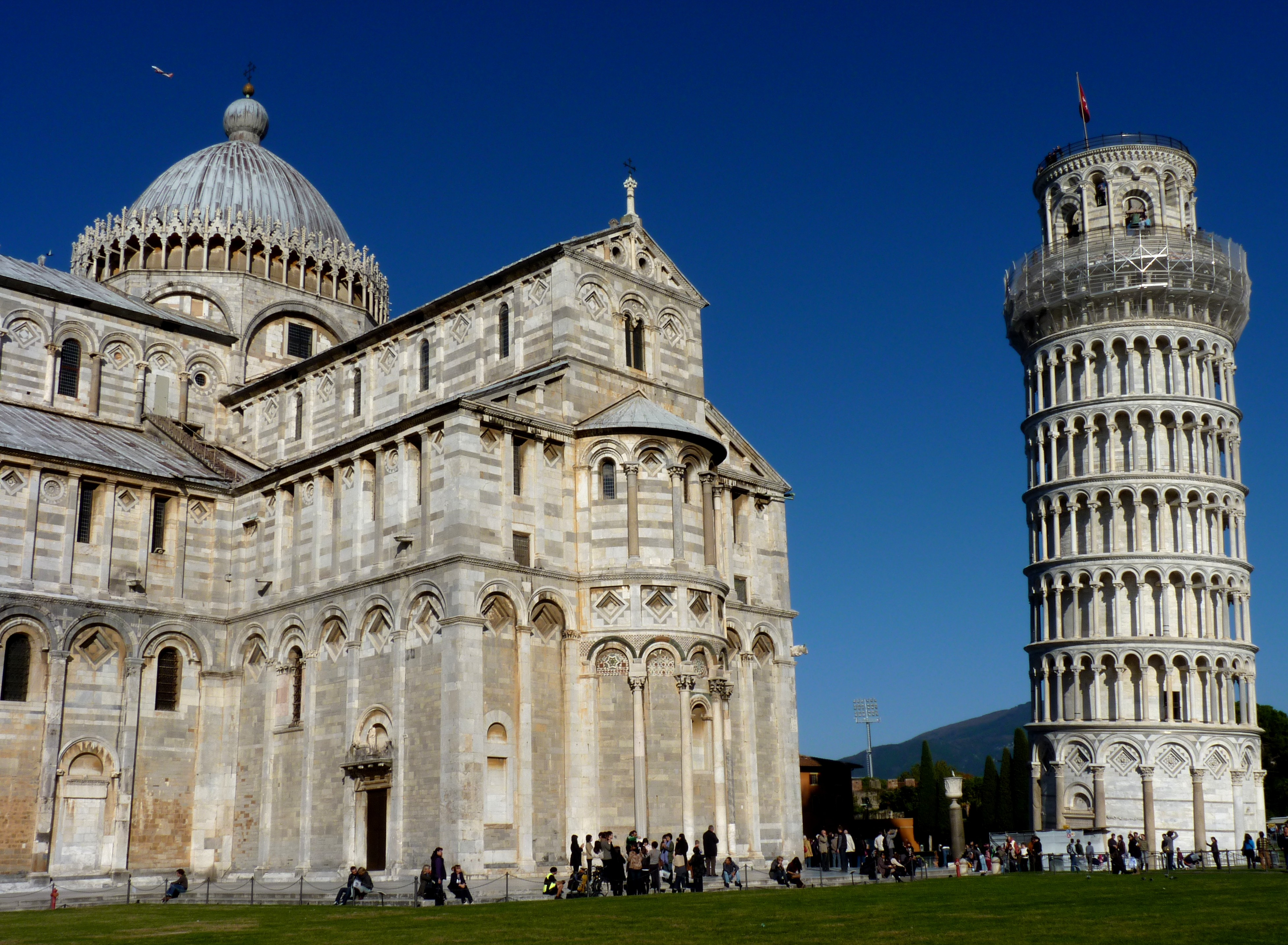
Leaning Tower of Pisa and Pisa Cathedral

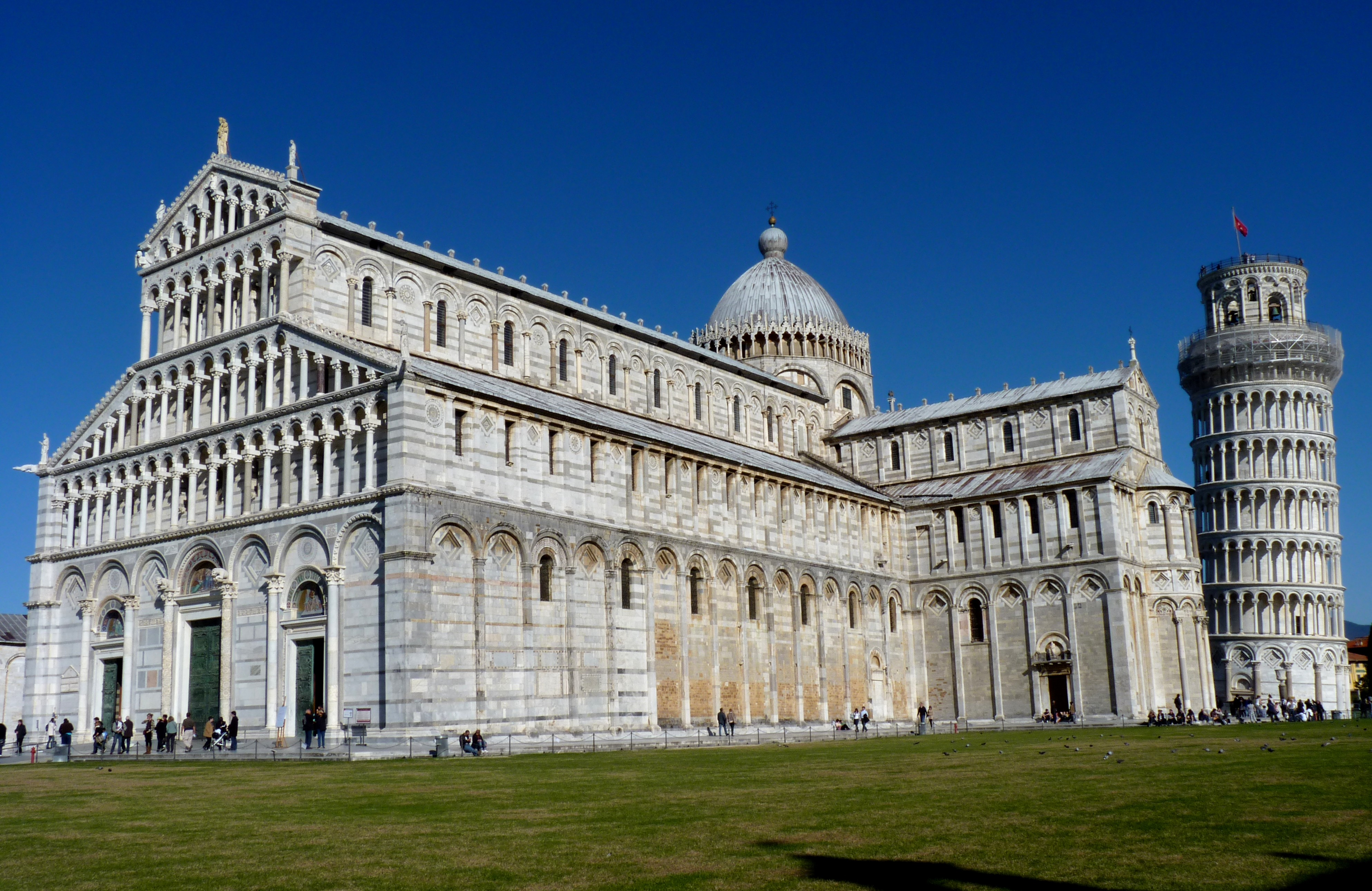
Leaning Tower of Pisa and Pisa Cathedral

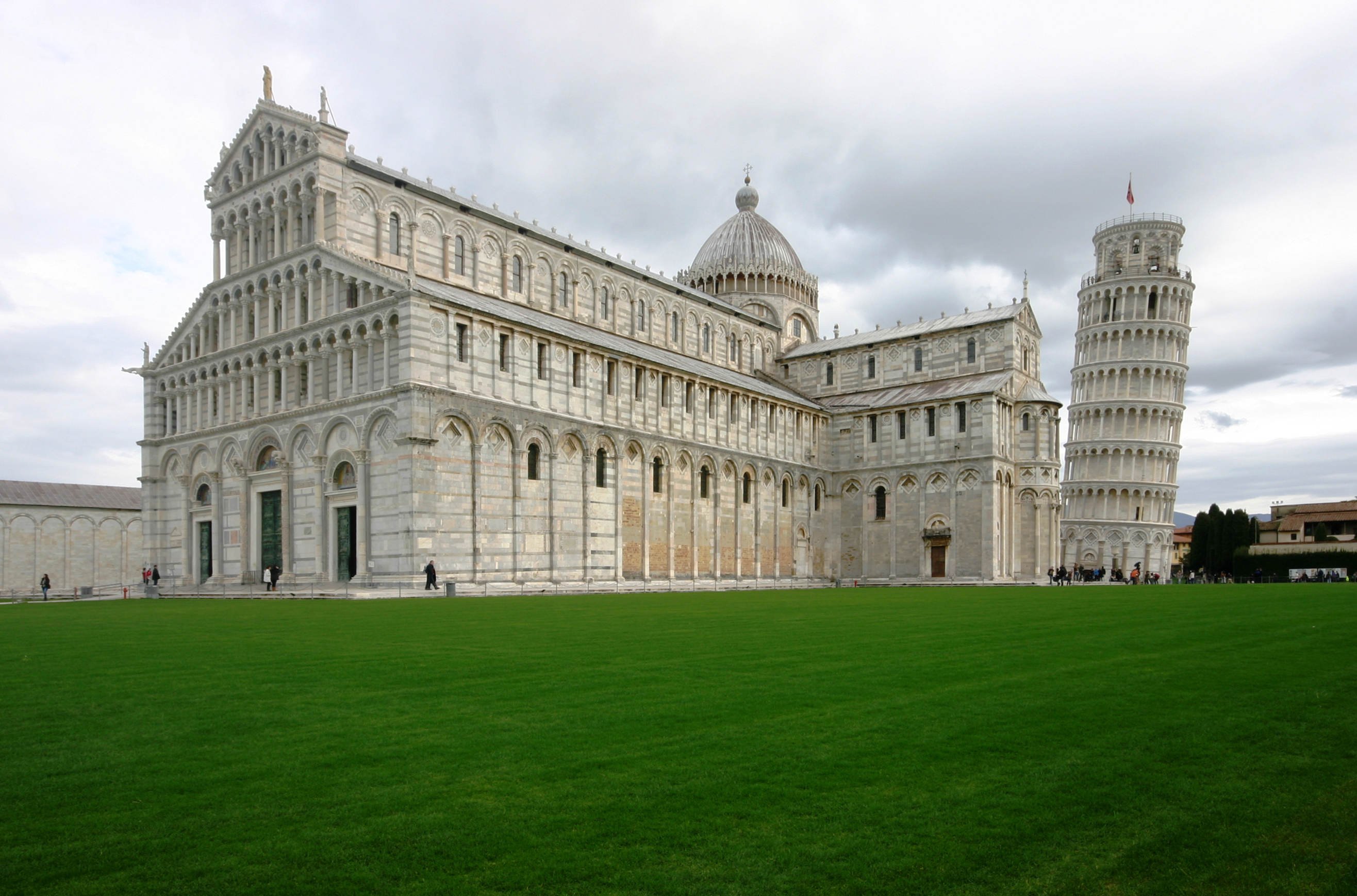
Cathedral and Campanile

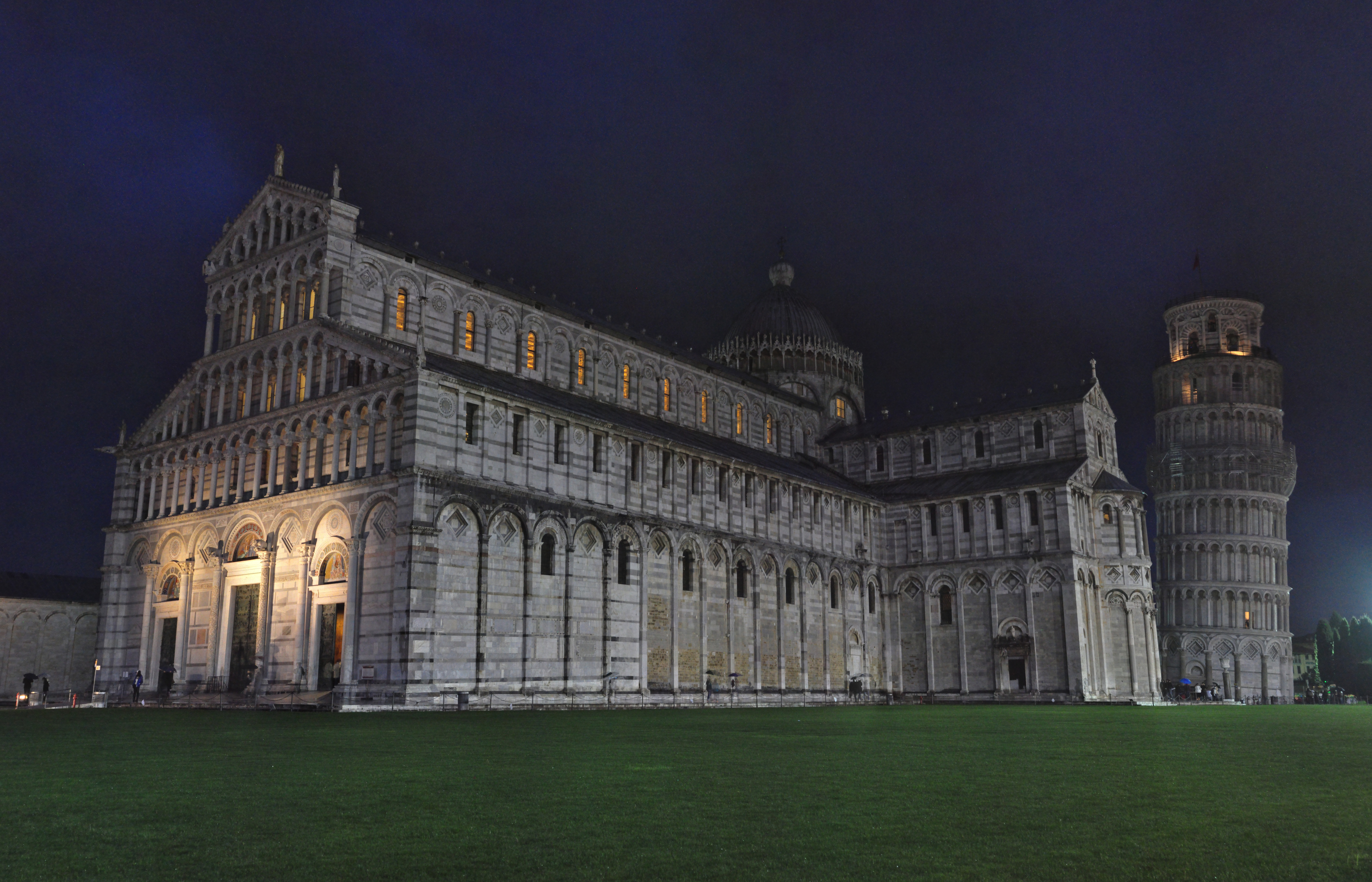
Duomo di Pisa by night

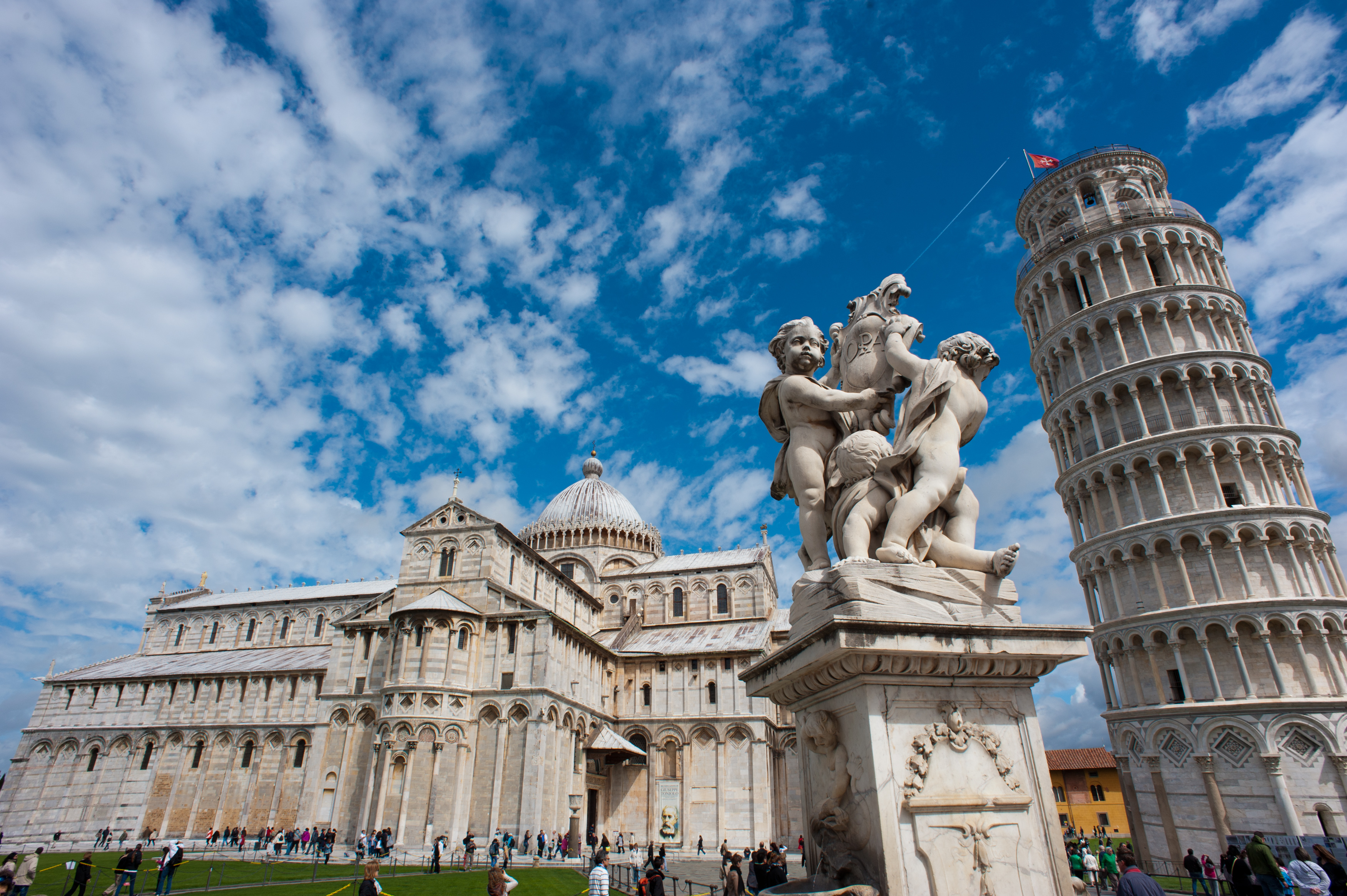
Leaning Tower of Pisa and Pisa Cathedral

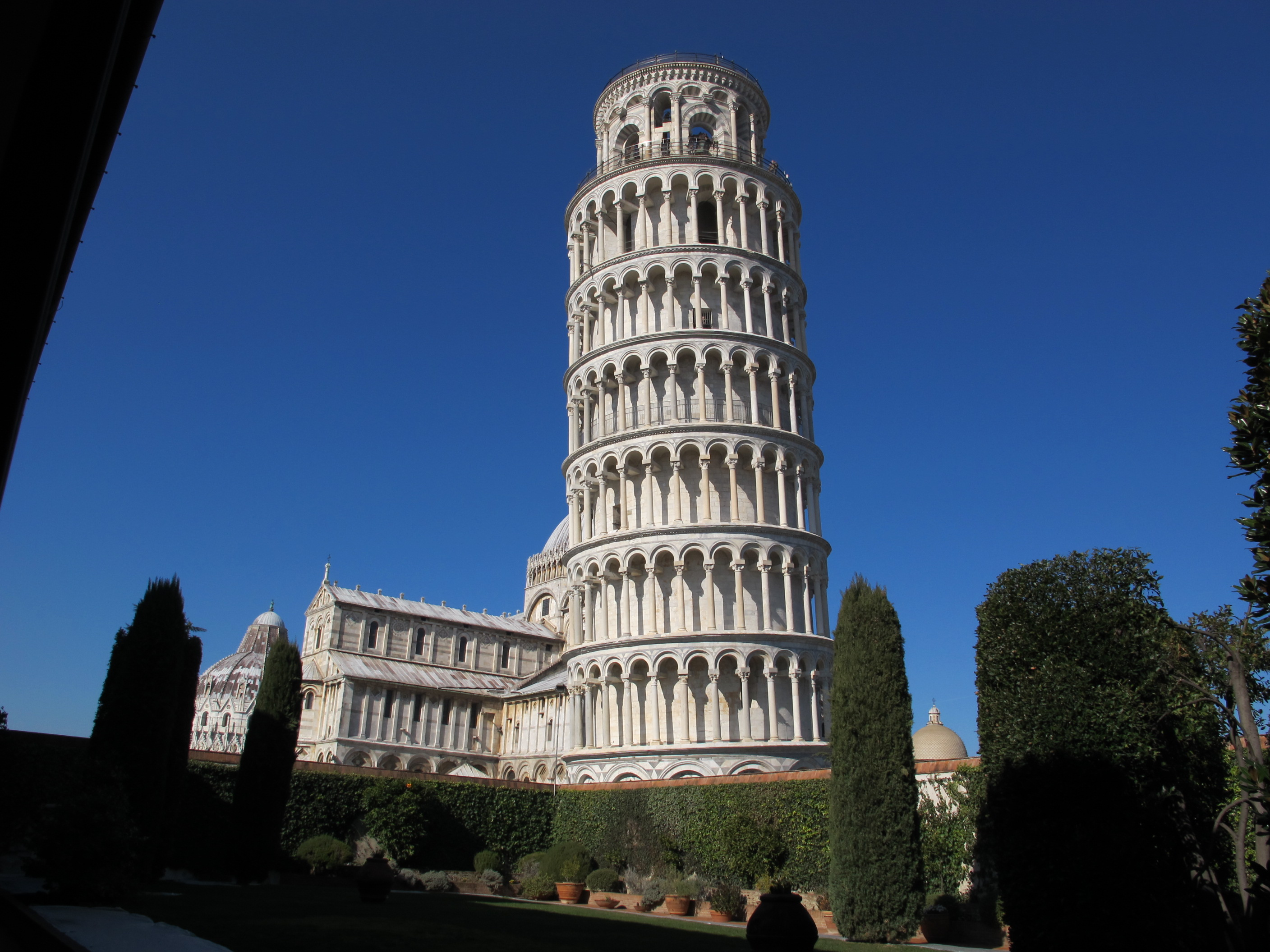
Leaning Tower of Pisa

== Camposanto Monumentale ==
The Camposanto Monumentale (Monumental Cemetery), also known as Campo Santo or Camposanto Vecchio (Old Cemetery), is located at the northern edge of the square. This walled cemetery is said to have been built around a shipload of sacred soil from Calvary, brought back to Pisa from the Third Crusade by Ubaldo de' Lanfranchi, the archbishop of Pisa in the 12th century. This is where the name Campo Santo (Holy Field) originates.

The building itself dates from a century later and was erected over the earlier burial ground. The building of this huge, oblong Gothic cloister began in 1278 by the architect Giovanni di Simone. He died in 1284 when Pisa suffered a defeat in a naval battle of Meloria against the Genoans. The cemetery was only completed in 1464. The outer wall is composed of 43 blind arches. There are two doorways. The one on the right is crowned by a gracious Gothic tabernacle and contains the Virgin Mary with Child surrounded by four saints. It is the work from the second half of the 14th century by a follower of Giovanni Pisano. Most of the tombs are under the arcades, although a few are on the central lawn. The inner court is surrounded by elaborate round arches with slender mullions and plurilobed tracery.

The Camposanto Monumentale once contained a large collection of Roman sculptures and sarcophagi, but now there are only 84 remaining. The walls were once covered in frescoes, the first were applied in 1360, the last about three centuries later. The Stories of the Old Testament by Benozzo Gozzoli (c. 15th century) were situated in the north gallery, while the south arcade was famous for the Stories of the Genesis by Piero di Puccio (c. late 15th century). The most remarkable fresco is The Triumph of Death, a realistic work by Buonamico Buffalmacco. On 27 July 1944, incendiary bombs dropped by Allied aircraft set the roof of the building on fire and covered them in molten lead, all but destroying them. Since 1945, restoration works have been going on and now the Campo Santo has been brought back to its original state.

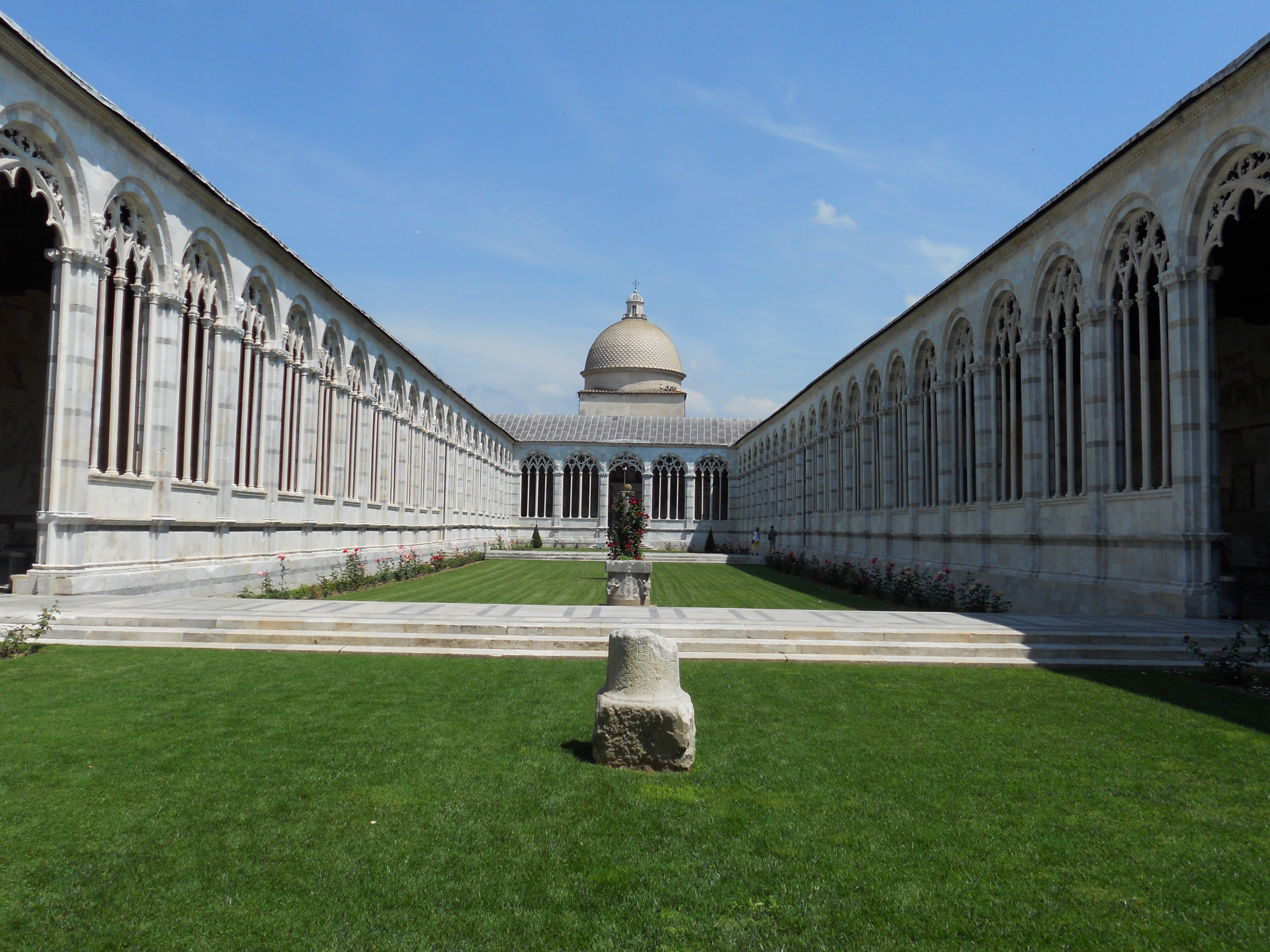
Camposanto Monumentale interior

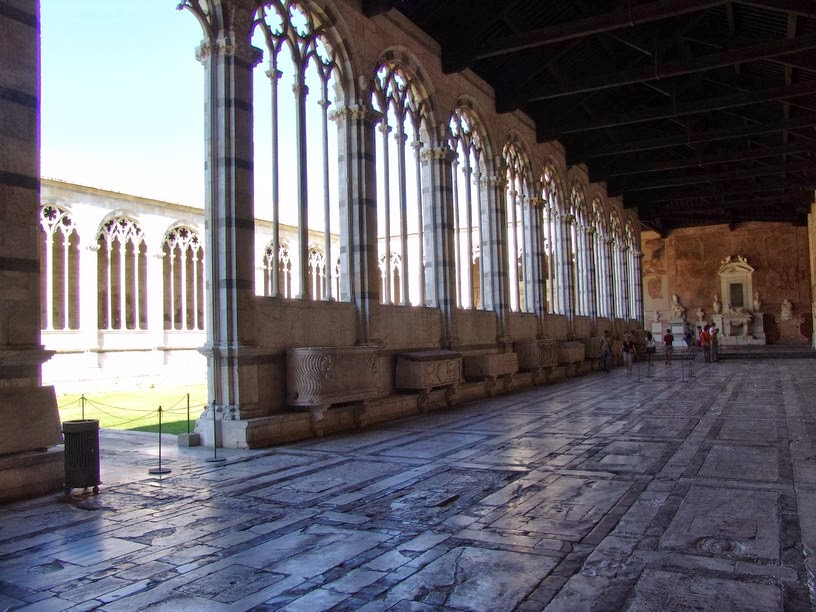
Hallway in Camposanto Monumentale

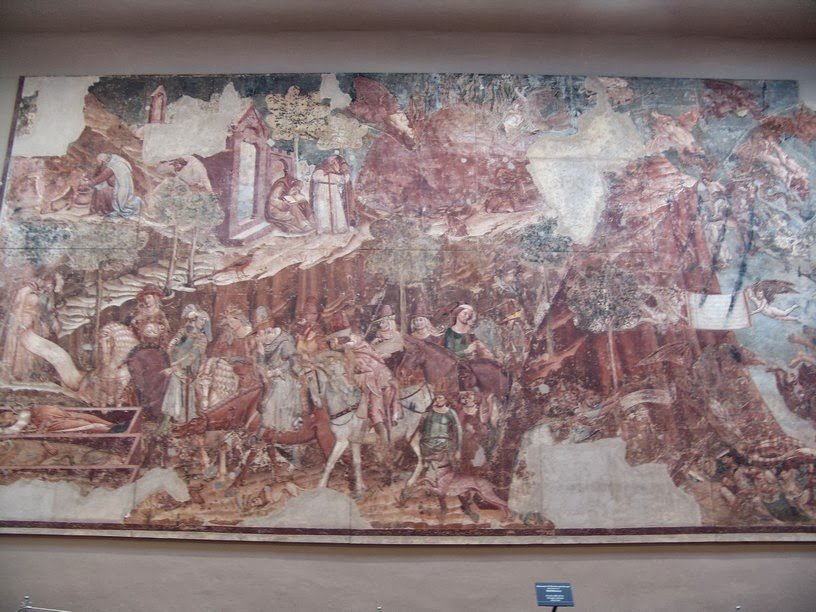
Frescos in Camposanto Monumentale

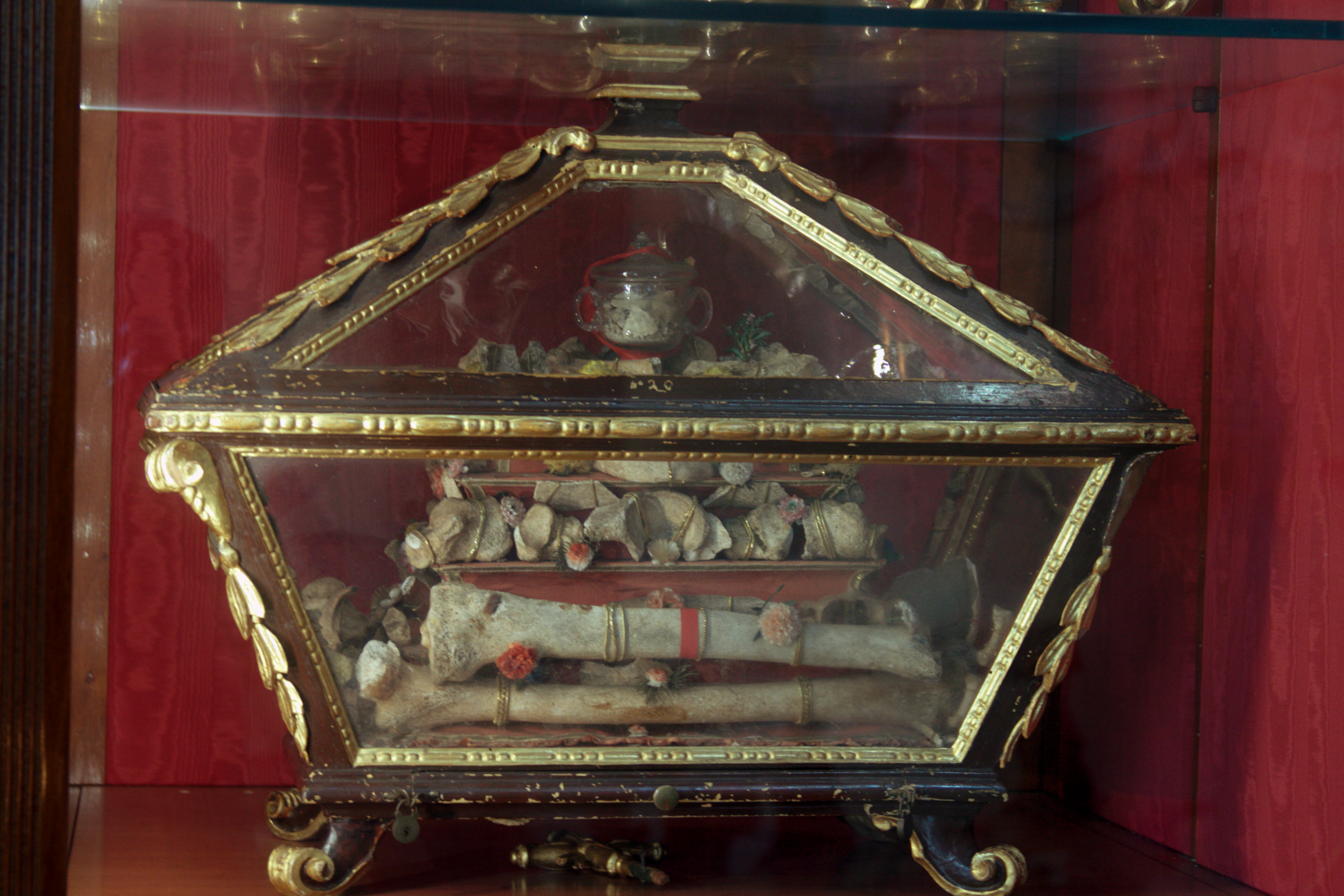
Some of the Saints' relics in the Dal Pozzo chapel

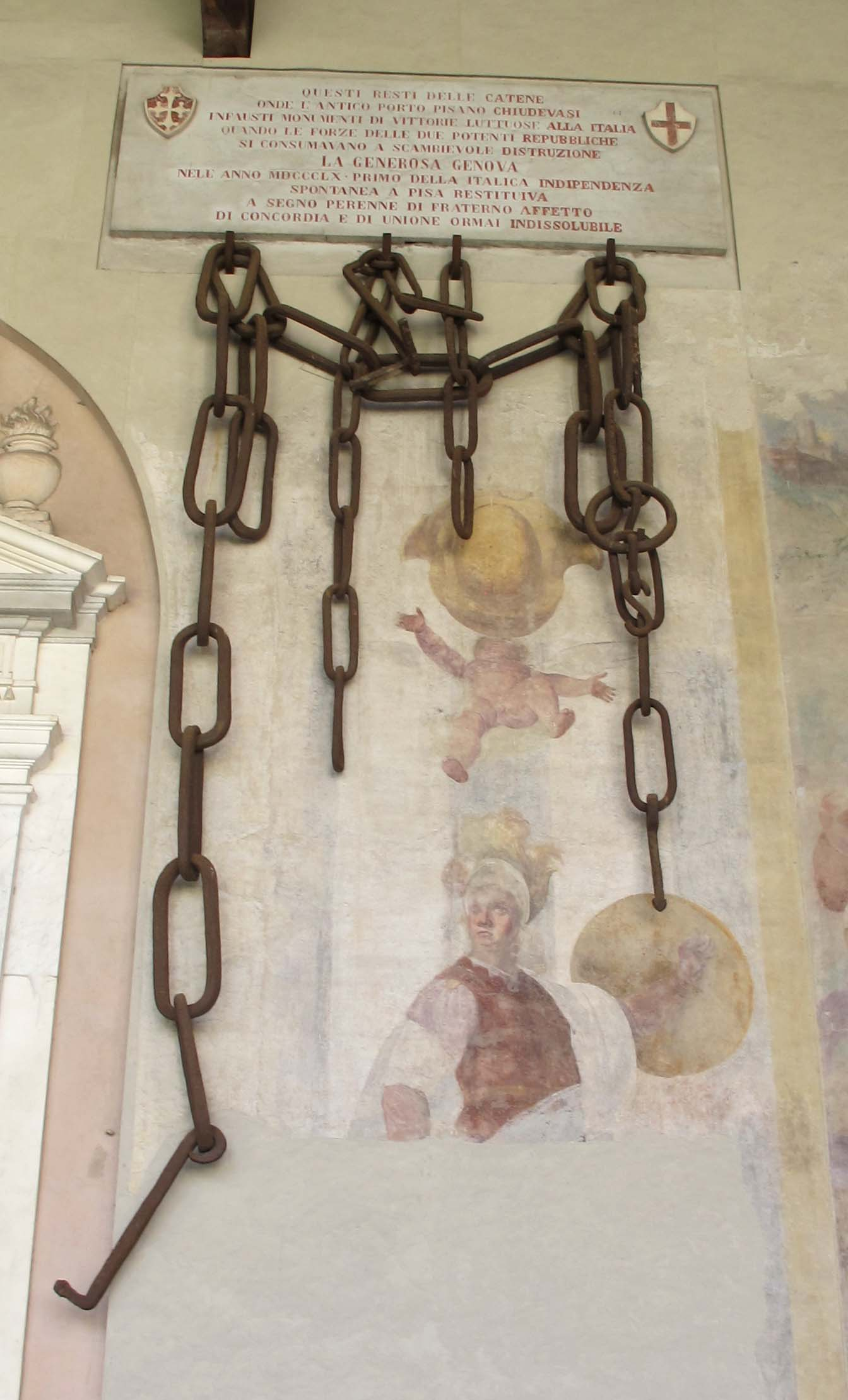
Chains of the medieval harbour of Pisa

== Ospedale Nuovo di Santo Spirito ==
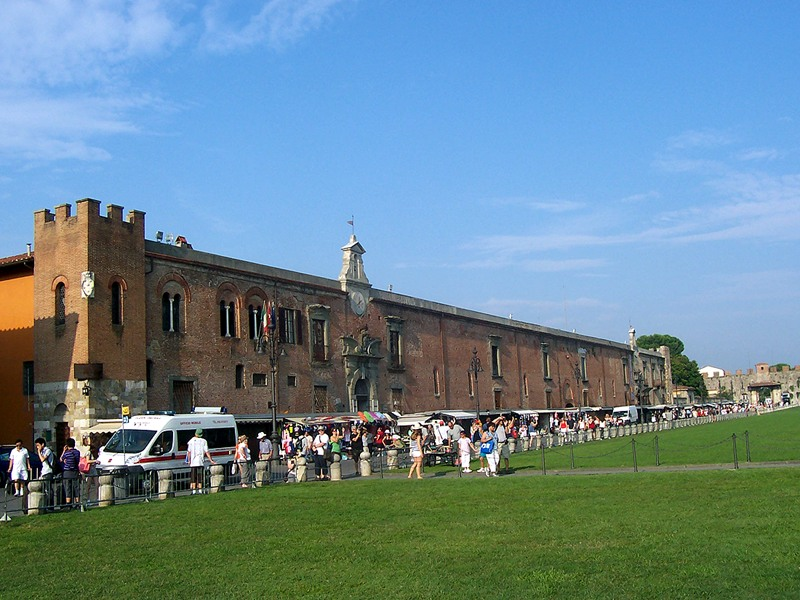
Nuovo di Santo Spirito

The Ospedale Nuovo di Santo Spirito (New Hospital of Holy Spirit) is located on the south area of the square. Built in 1257 by Giovanni di Simone over a preexisting smaller hospital, the function of this hospital was to help pilgrims, poor, sick people, and abandoned children by providing a shelter. The name of the hospital was later changed to Ospedale della Misericordia (Hospital of Mercy) or di Santa Chiara (Sant Claire), which was the name of the small church included in the complex.

The hospital exterior was constructed with brick walls with two-light windows in gothic style; the hospital interior was painted in two colours, black and white, to imitate the marble colours of the other buildings. In 1562, during the time when the Medici dominated the city, the hospital was restructured according to Florentine renaissance canons; all the doors and windows were modified with new rectangular ones encased in grey sandstone.

Today, the building is no longer entirely a hospital. Since 1976, the middle part of the building contains the Sinopias Museum, where original drawings of the Campo Santo frescoes are kept.

== Palazzo dell'Opera ==
The Palazzo dell'Opera (Opera in the sense of "works" - these were the workshops of the complex) is at the south east corner of the square. Parts have been built in different periods, with the main building dating back to at least the 14th century and the latest to the 19th century.

Originally these houses belonged to the workmen of the cathedral complex: the tailor, the gardener, the bell ringers, etc., until the 19th century when the administration offices of the Opera della Primaziale were moved in. In the same years the chapter house was also moved inside the complex. In the course of time the complex was rearranged several times, but the façade of the main building still conserves its original aspect.

In the first years of the 21st century the administration offices and the chapter moved again to a nearby palace close to the archbishopric. Only a few rooms on the ground floor are still used as offices for the surveillance and technical staff. After the move, the upper rooms were transformed in a platform for temporary exhibitions (2014). This is the first time people can actually visit those rooms.

The most interesting rooms open to the public are the President room, the Deputation room, the chapel and the Chapter room. Among the closed ones are the "Loggetta" room (with frescoes by Agostino Ghirlanda), the "Scrittoio" room (with a fresco by Il Sodoma), the "Viola" room and the technical room.

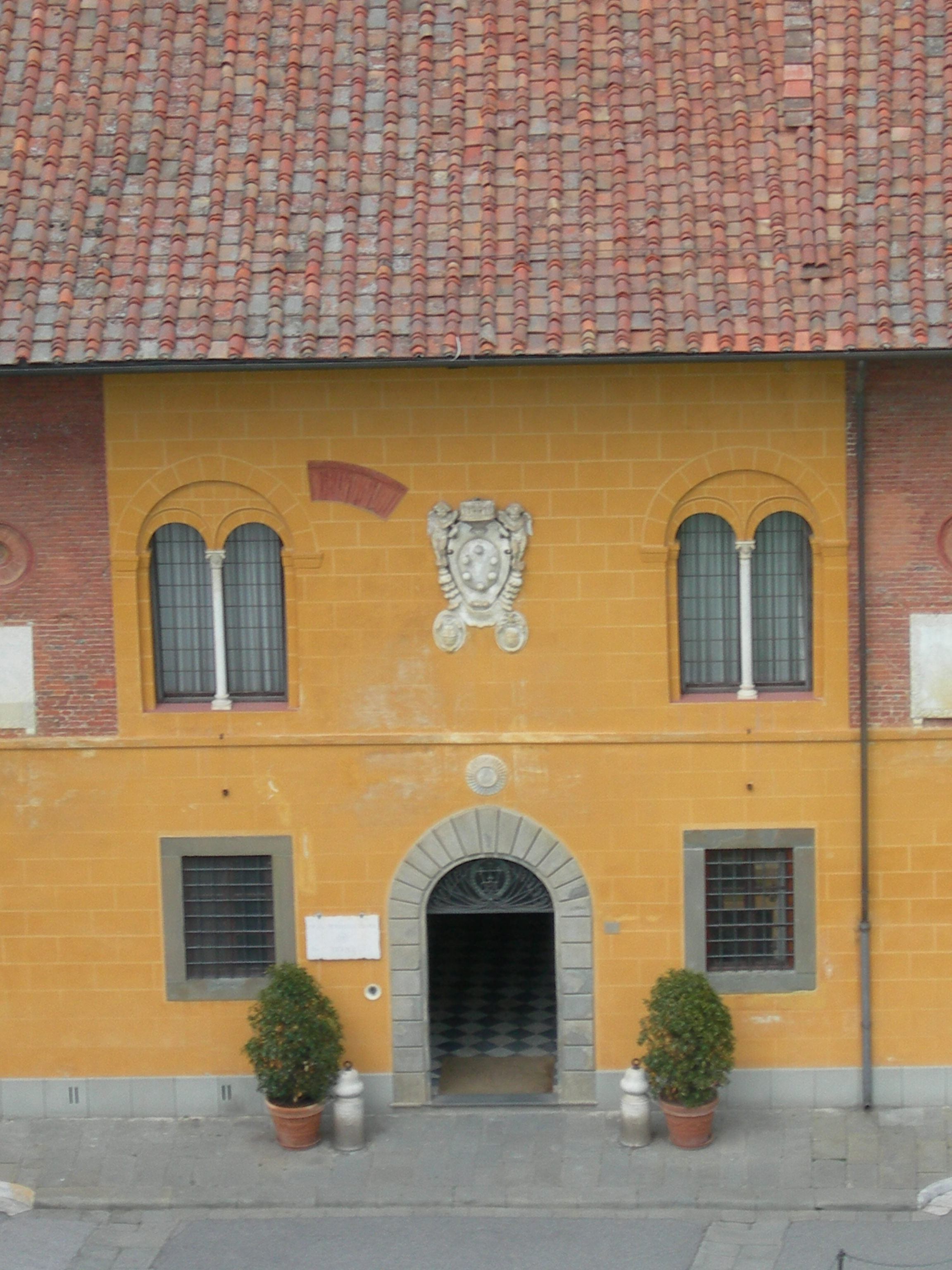
Main entrance

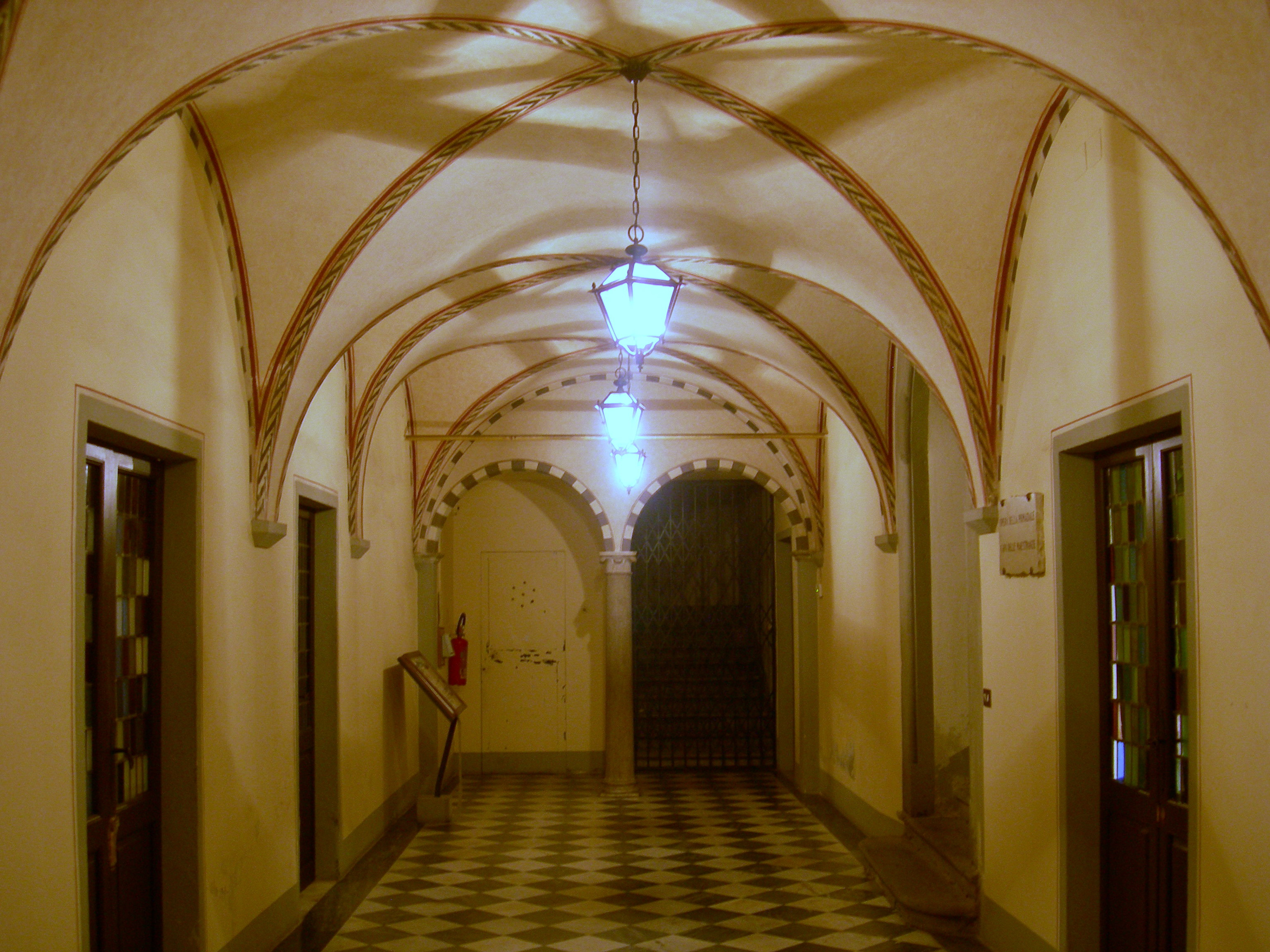
The corridor on the ground floor

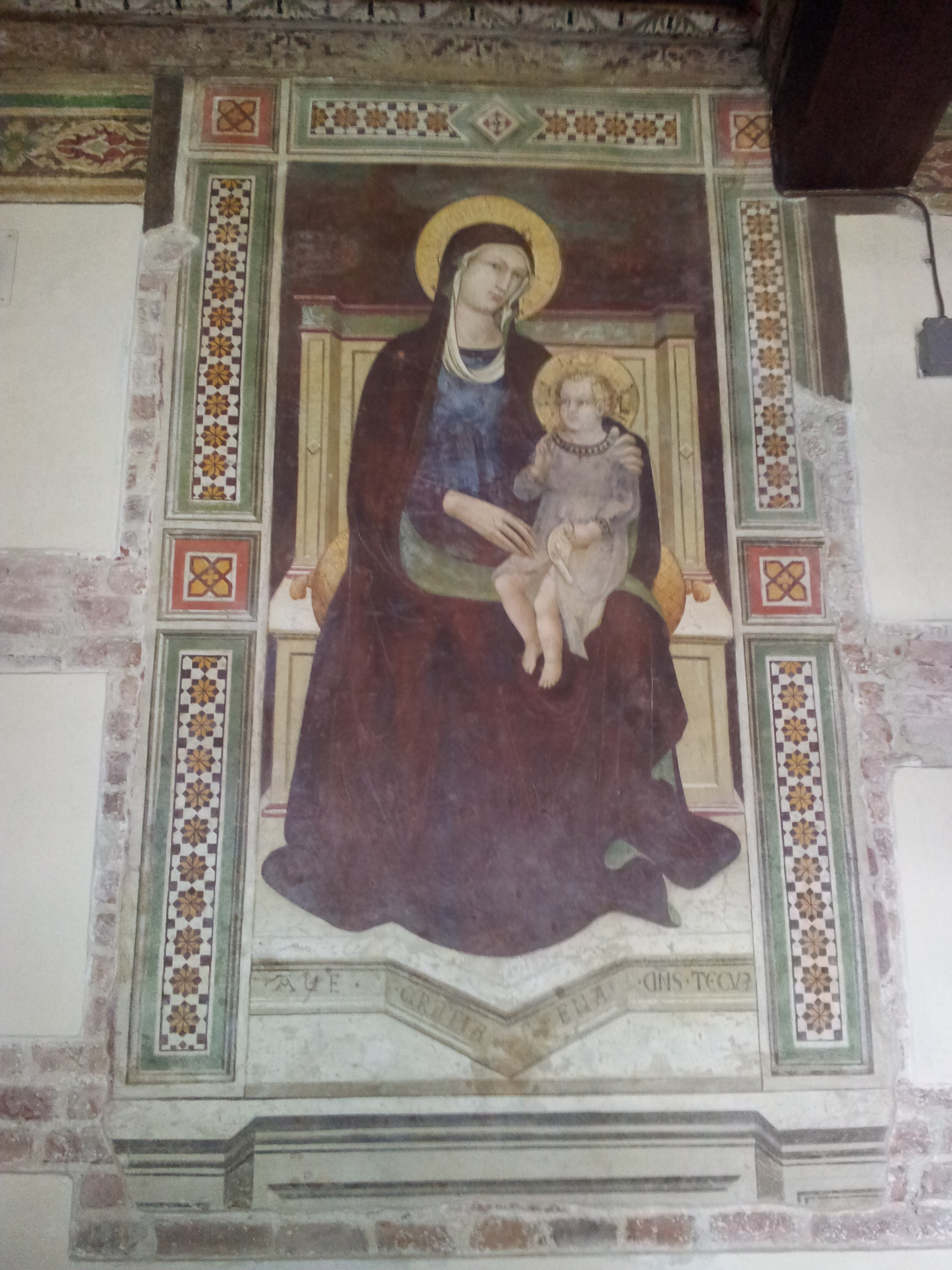
Fresco in the technical room, painted in the first quarter of the 15th century by a senese painter

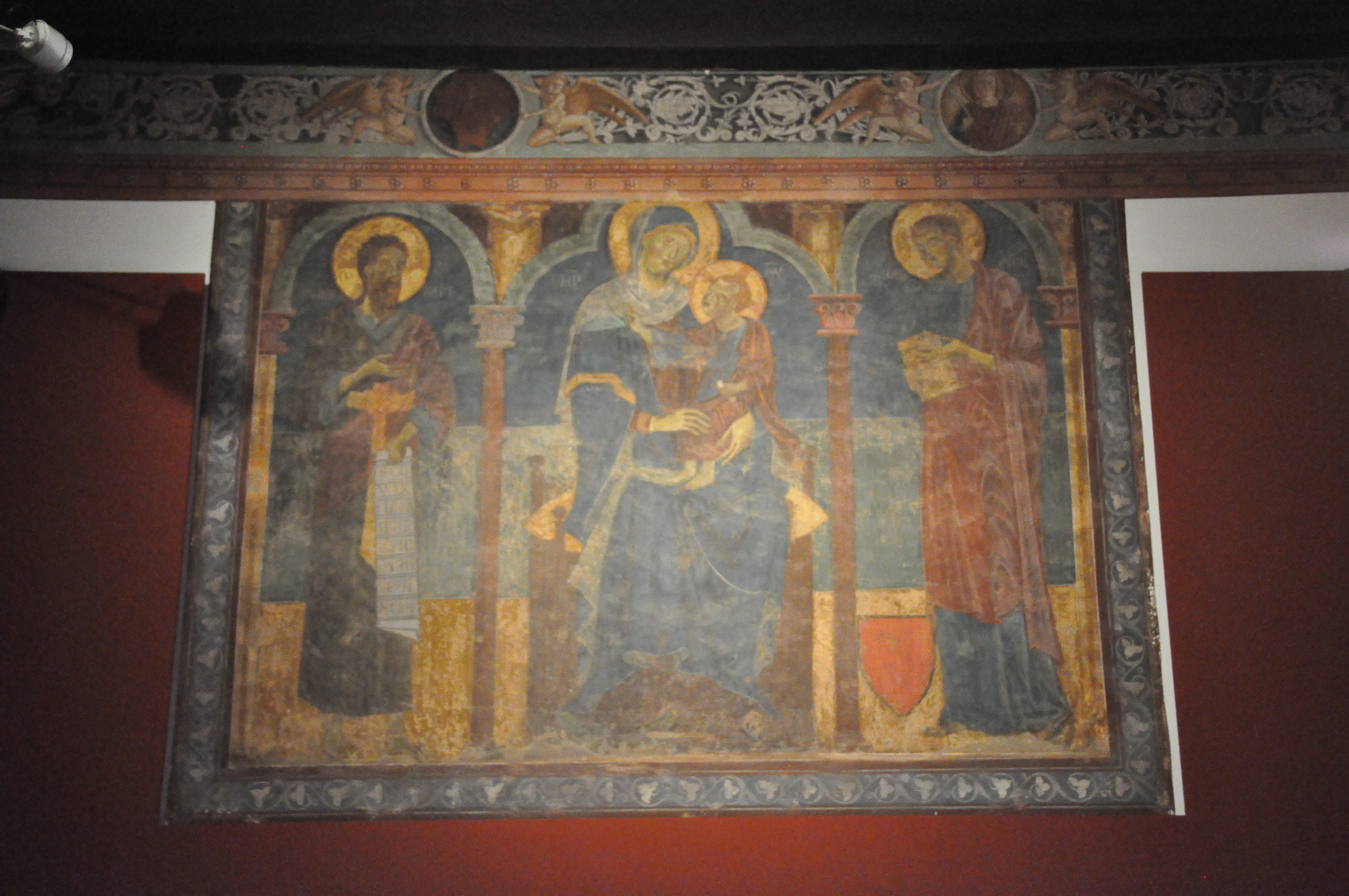
Fresco in the Deputation room, painted in 1299 by Vincino di Vanni and Giovanni d'Apparecchiato

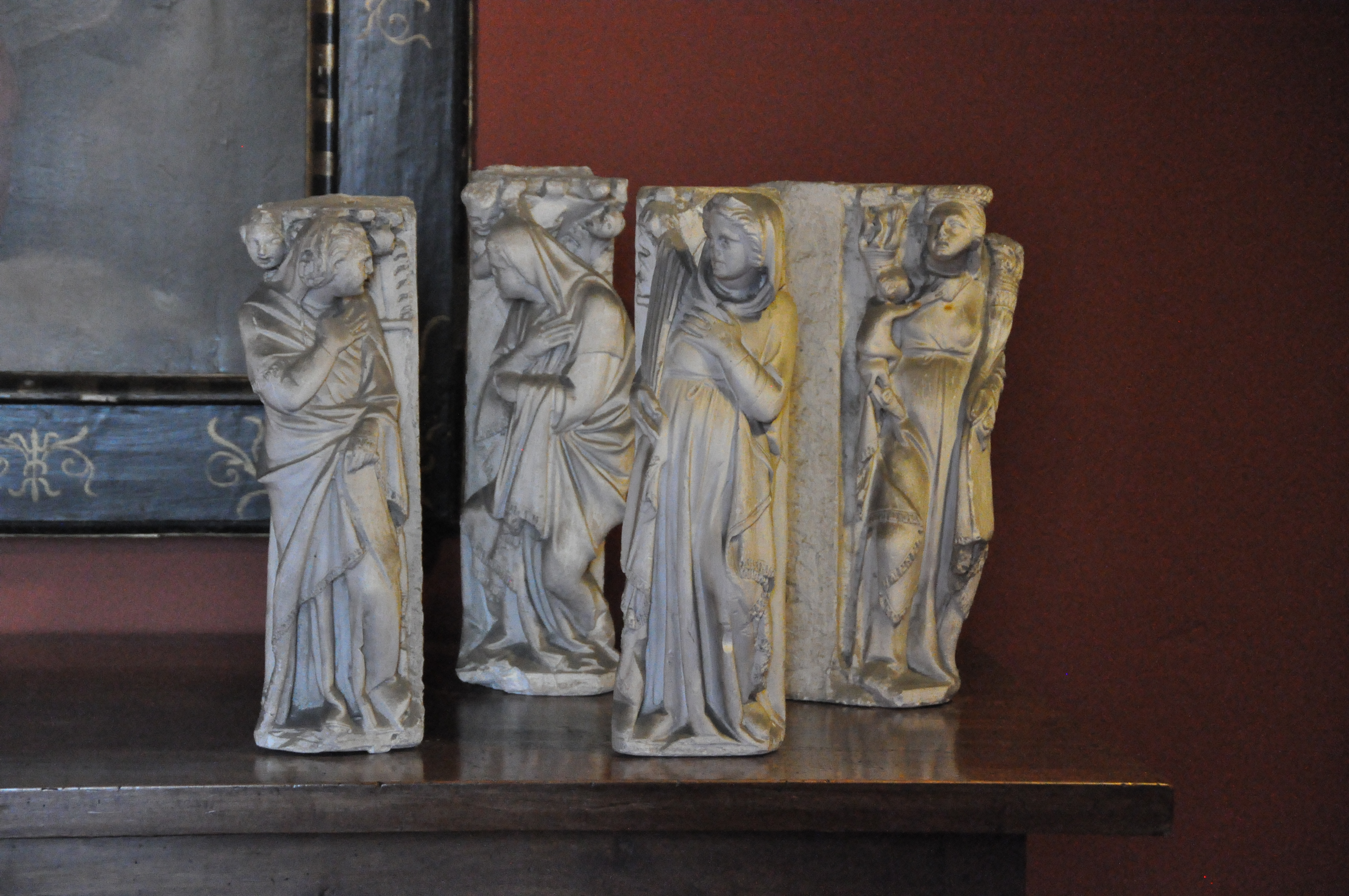
Some of the original parts of the Giovanni Pisano's pulpit in the President room

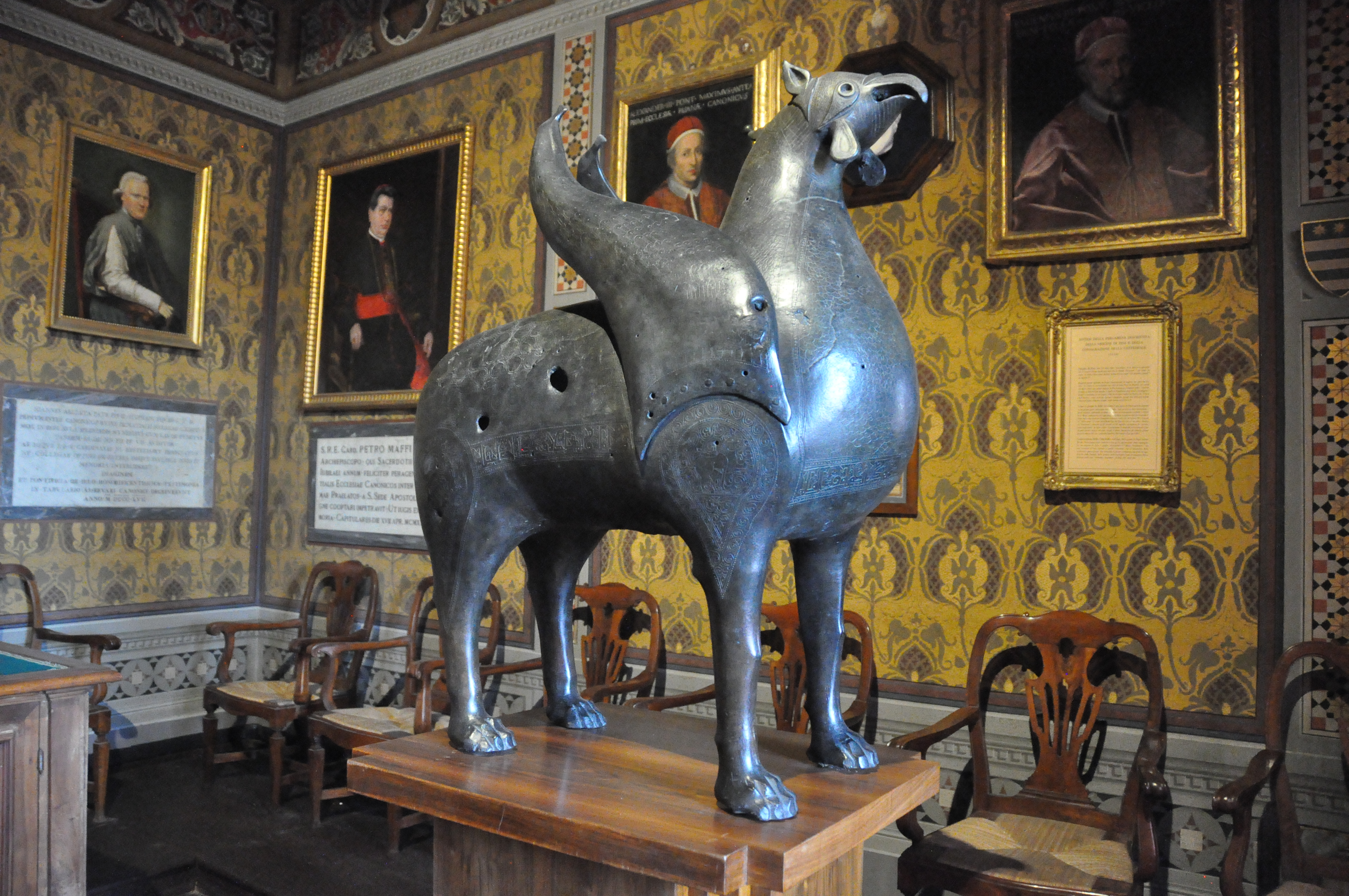
The Pisa Griffin in the Chapter room

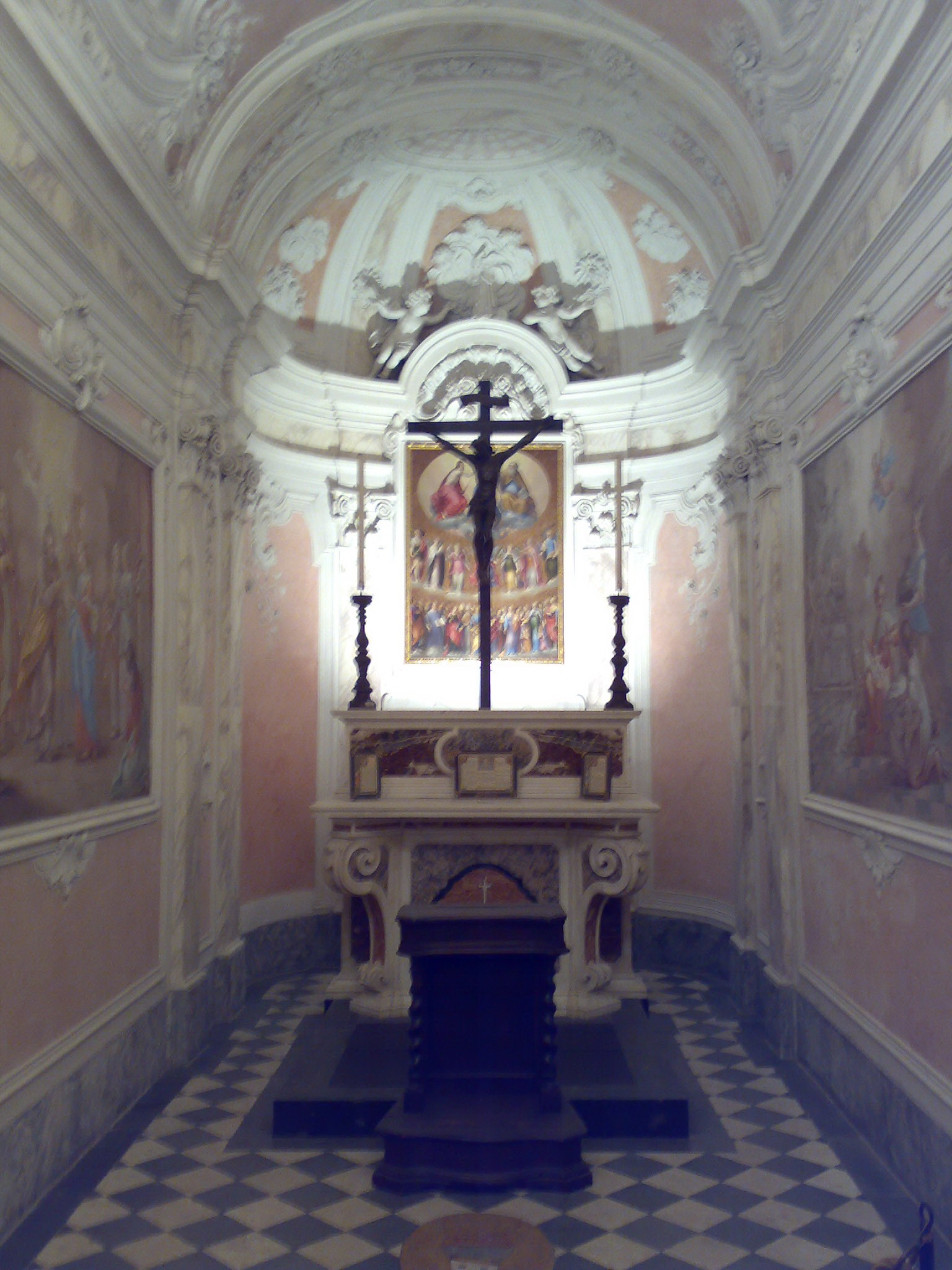
Chapel

== See also ==
- Ablaq
- Architecture of cathedrals and great churches
- Cathedrals in Italy
- Late medieval domes
- Pisa Cathedral

== Sources ==
- Tobino, Mario (1982). Pisa la Piazza dei Miracoli. De Agostini.
