= The Round Tower =

The Round Tower may refer to

== Titles ==
- The Round Tower (film), a British television movie of 1998

== Buildings ==
- Rundetaarn, a 17th-century round tower in Copenhagen, Denmark
- Round Tower (Portsmouth), a 15th century tower in Portsmouth, England

== See also ==
- Round tower (disambiguation)
- Irish round tower
- Fortified tower
