= Pisa Baptistery =

- Baptistery
- Pisa Baptistery
- 43°43′24″N 10°23′38″E
- Location: Piazza del Duomo, 23, 56126 Pisa PI, Italy
- Country: Italy
- Denomination: Catholic Church

Architecture
- Completed: 1363

UNESCO World Heritage Site
- Part of: Piazza del Duomo, Pisa
- Criteria: Cultural: (i), (iv)
- Reference: 395
- Inscription: 1987 (11th Session)

The Pisa Baptistery of St. John (Italian: Battistero di San Giovanni) is a Catholic ecclesiastical building in Pisa, Italy. Construction started in 1152 under the direction of Diotisalvi (signed and dated) to replace an older baptistery. Completed in 1363 in a Gothic manner, it is part of the architectural ensemble and World Heritage Site of the Piazza dei Miracoli, alongside the Duomo di Pisa, its campanile, the famous Leaning Tower of Pisa, and the Camposanto.

== Description ==
With a height of 54.86 meters, and 34.13 meters in diameter, it is the largest baptistery in Italy. The Pisa Baptistery is an example of the stylistic transition in the course of 200 years from the Romanesque to the Gothic idiom. Begun in the mid-12th century by its first architect Diotisalvi in the Romanesque style, with round arches and rather simple figural decoration, while the upper sections are in the Gothic style, with pointed wimpergs and a rich figurative program. Like the cathedral and the campanile the Baptistery is built of bichromatic Carrara marble, white with recurring horizontal lines in blueish-grey stone, also used for abstract floral and graphic decoration, a unique trait of some of the most important religious buildings in Tuscany (in the neighboring Florence and Pistoia the dark marmo verde from Prato was used).

The east portal from probably around 1200 is facing the façade of the cathedral. The door is flanked by two columns with foliage decoration, a direct copy of a classical model. Engaged with the portal frame are two smaller three-quarter columns with a simpler, less deep floral ornamentation. The inner jambs between each pair of columns are decorated each with eleven figurative reliefs executed in Byzantine style. On the left there are depictions of the months (with September and October combined in one panel), beginning with January at the bottom. On the right it begins at the top with the Ascension of Christ, then angels, Mary with lifted hands, then the Apostels depicted in pairs looking up, and second to the bottom the Harrowing of Hell; the lowermost relief shows King David. The tripartite form is conveyed in the arch with three retreating archivolts with the Twenty-Four Elders in medaillons and the Lamb of God as the keystone.

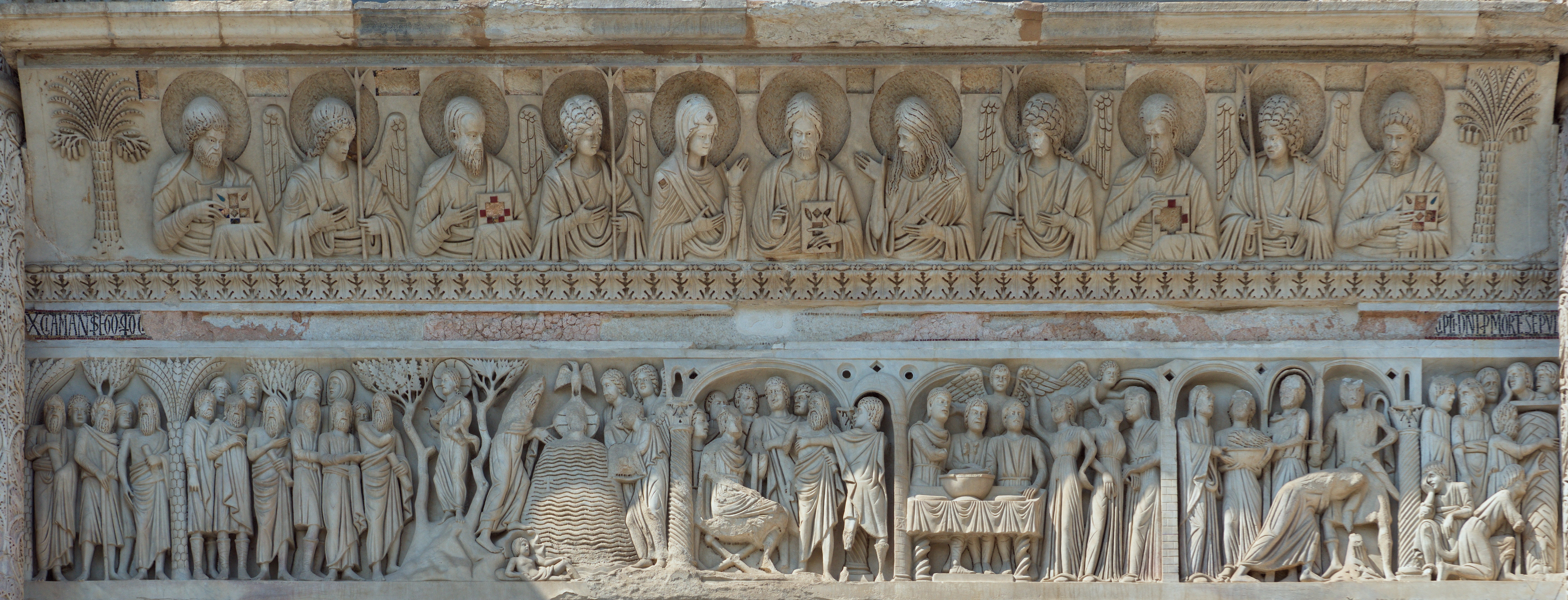
The architrave over the main portal, c. 1200

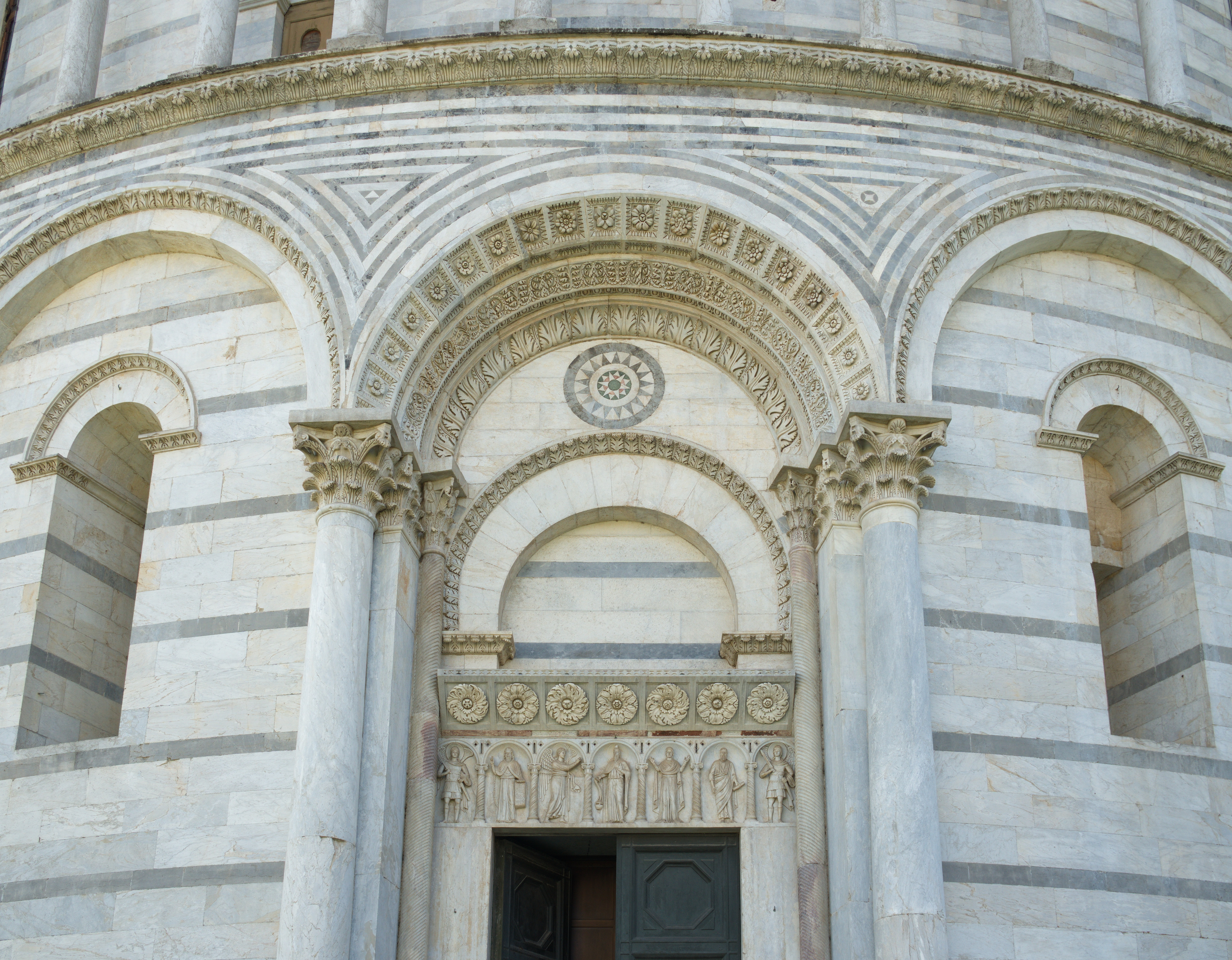
The north portal, c. 1200

The architrave is divided in two tiers. The upper one is slightly tilted and shows Christ between Mary and St. John the Baptist, flanked by angels and the four evangelists. The lower tier depicts several episodes in the life of St. John the Baptist, the natural patron of the baptistery: his sermon, the baptism of Christ, his imprisonment on behalf of Herod, Salome dances before Herod, his subsequent beheading and his burial. The architraves are probably by the same artists who also did the foiled columns and the reliefs on the jambs.

Only the north portal has also figurative decoration on its architrave, picturing the Annunciation to Zechariah and St. Elizabeth, the parents of St. John, flanked by two prophets and two angels in light armour with swords.

Constructed on the same unstable sand as the tower and cathedral, the Baptistery leans 0.6 degrees toward the cathedral. Originally the shape of the Baptistery, according to the project by Diotisalvi, was different. It was perhaps similar to the church of Holy Sepulchre in Pisa, with its pyramidal roof. After the death of the architect, Nicola Pisano continued the work in the new Gothic language. The added outer shell in form of a cupola enclosed the pyramidal roof. The dome is clad with lead sheets on its southeast side (facing the cathedral) and red terracotta tiles on its northwestern half (facing the sea), giving a half grey and half red appearance from the south.

An inscription, currently undeciphered, is located to the left of the door jamb of the Baptistery.

=== The interior ===
The vast interior space is overwhelming, although it lacks decoration. The octagonal font at the centre dates from 1246 and was created by Guido Bigarelli da Como. The bronze sculpture of St. John the Baptist at the centre of the font is a work by Italo Griselli.

The famous pulpit was sculpted between 1255–1260 by Nicola Pisano, father of Giovanni Pisano, who sculpted the pulpit in the Duomo. The scenes on the pulpit, and especially the classical form of the nude Hercules, show Nicola Pisano's qualities as the most important precursor of Italian Renaissance sculpture by reinstating antique representations: surveys of the Italian Renaissance often begin with the year 1260, the year that Nicola Pisano dated this pulpit.

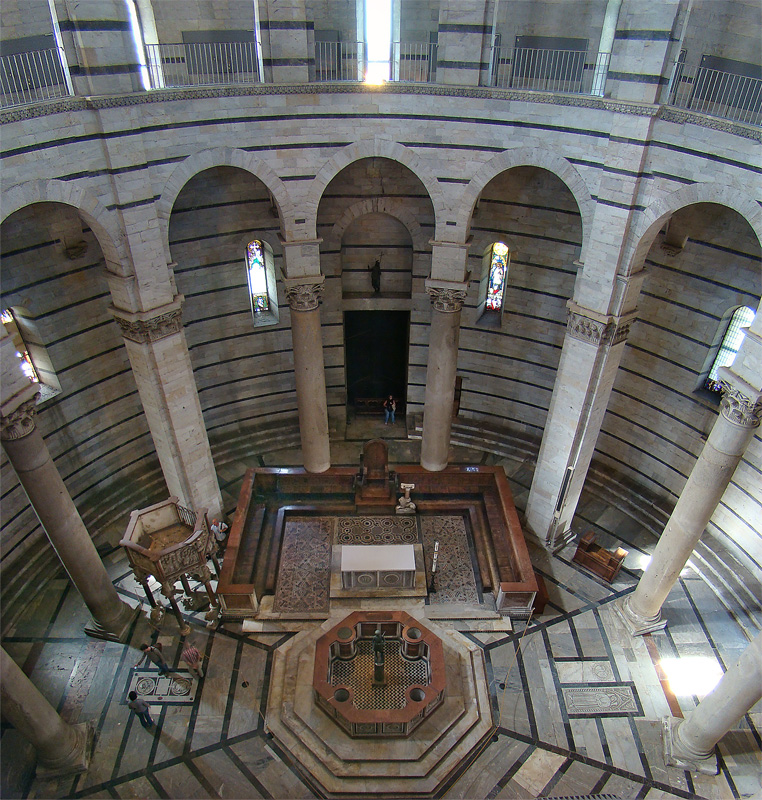
Baptistery interior from above

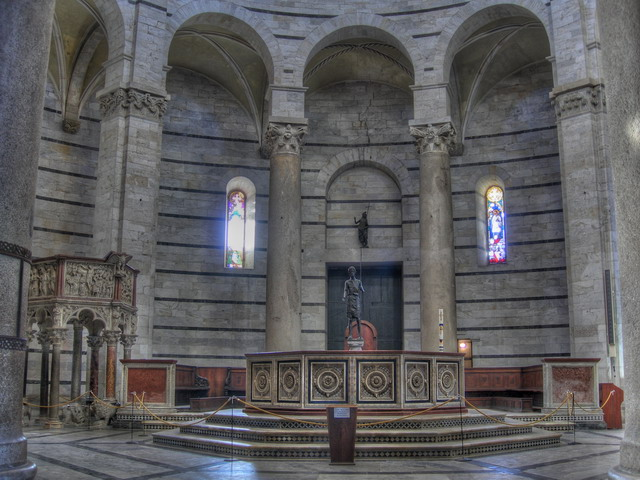
Baptistery interior

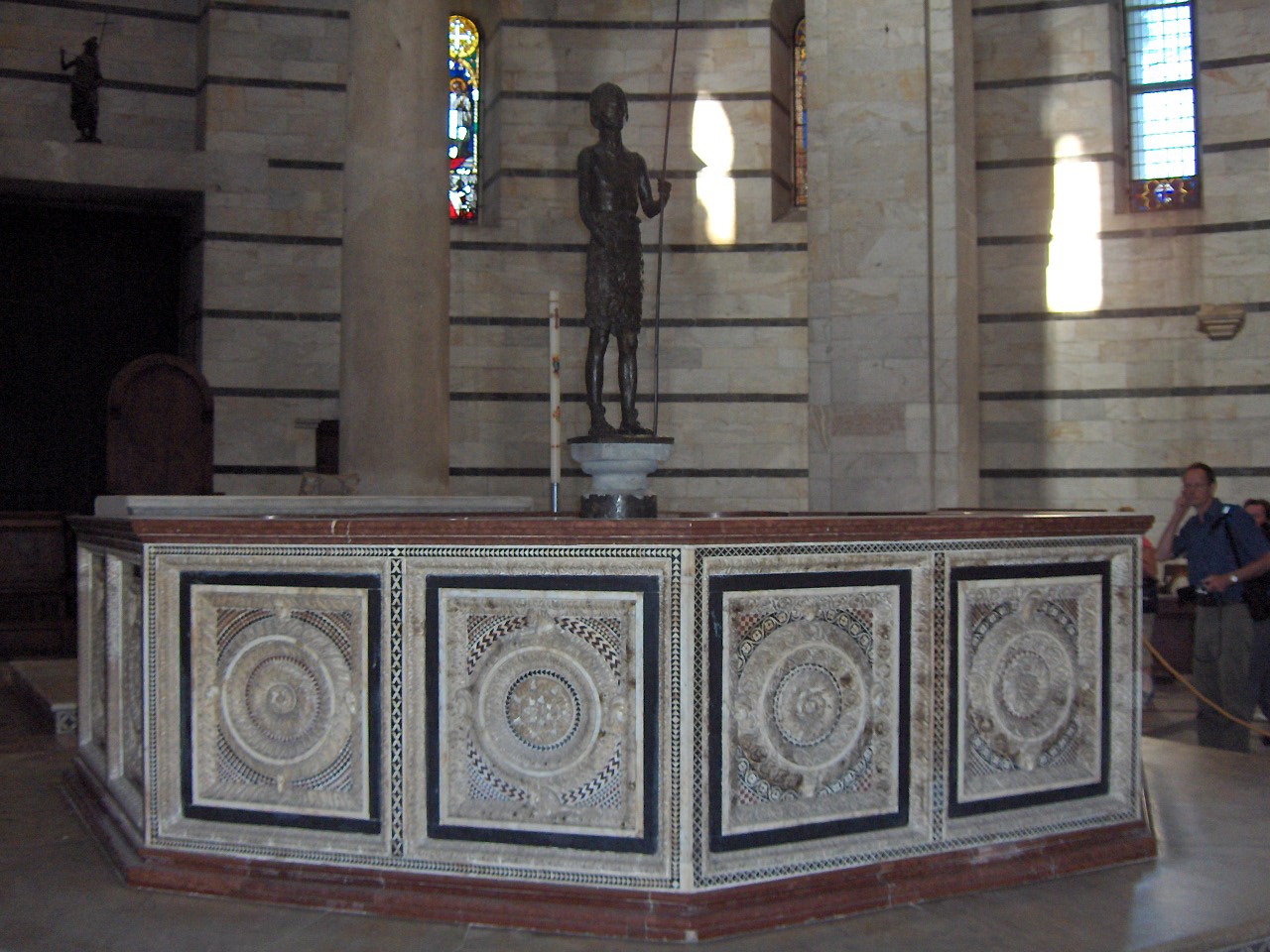
Baptistery font

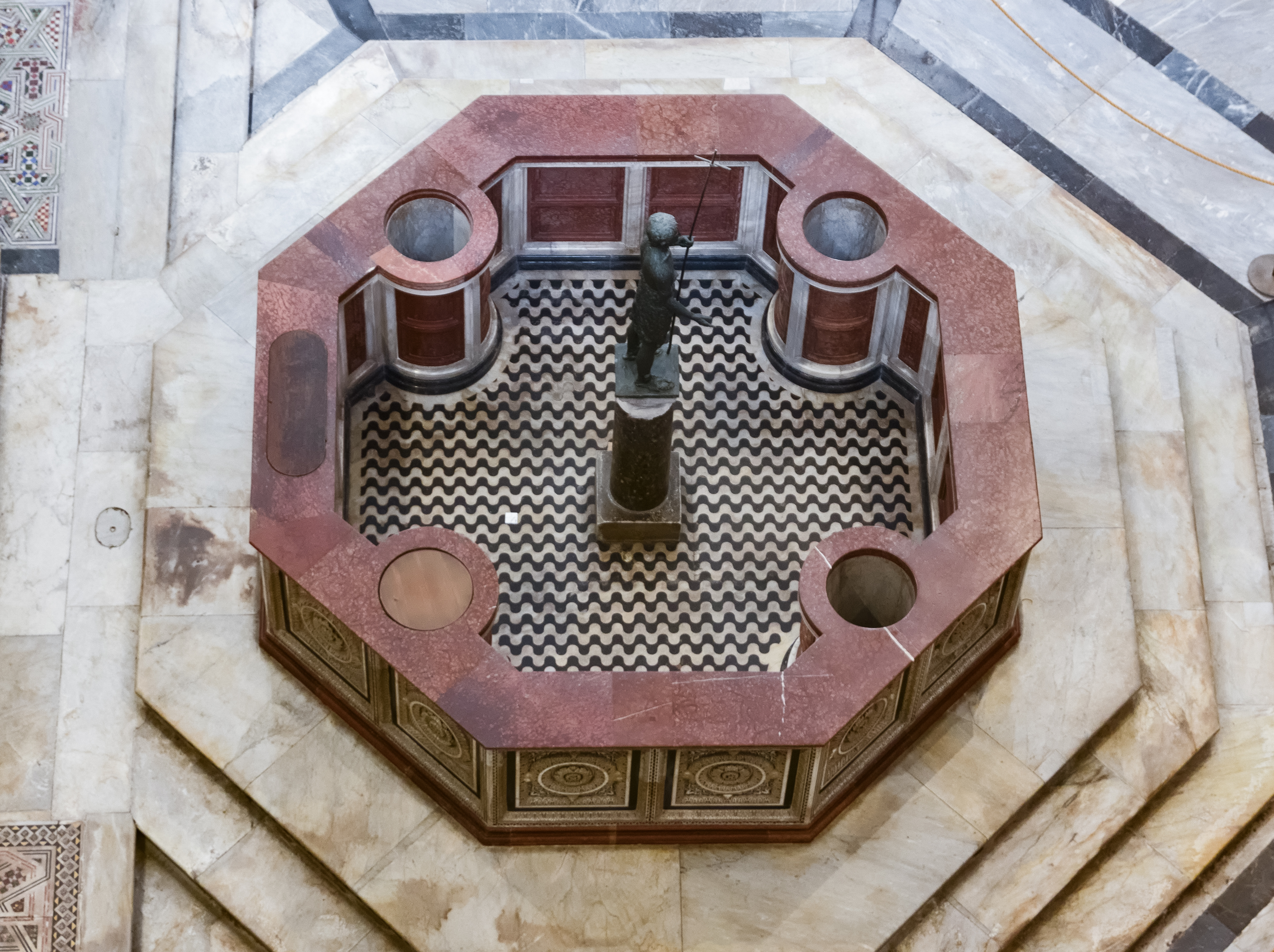
The font for immersion baptism from the gallery above

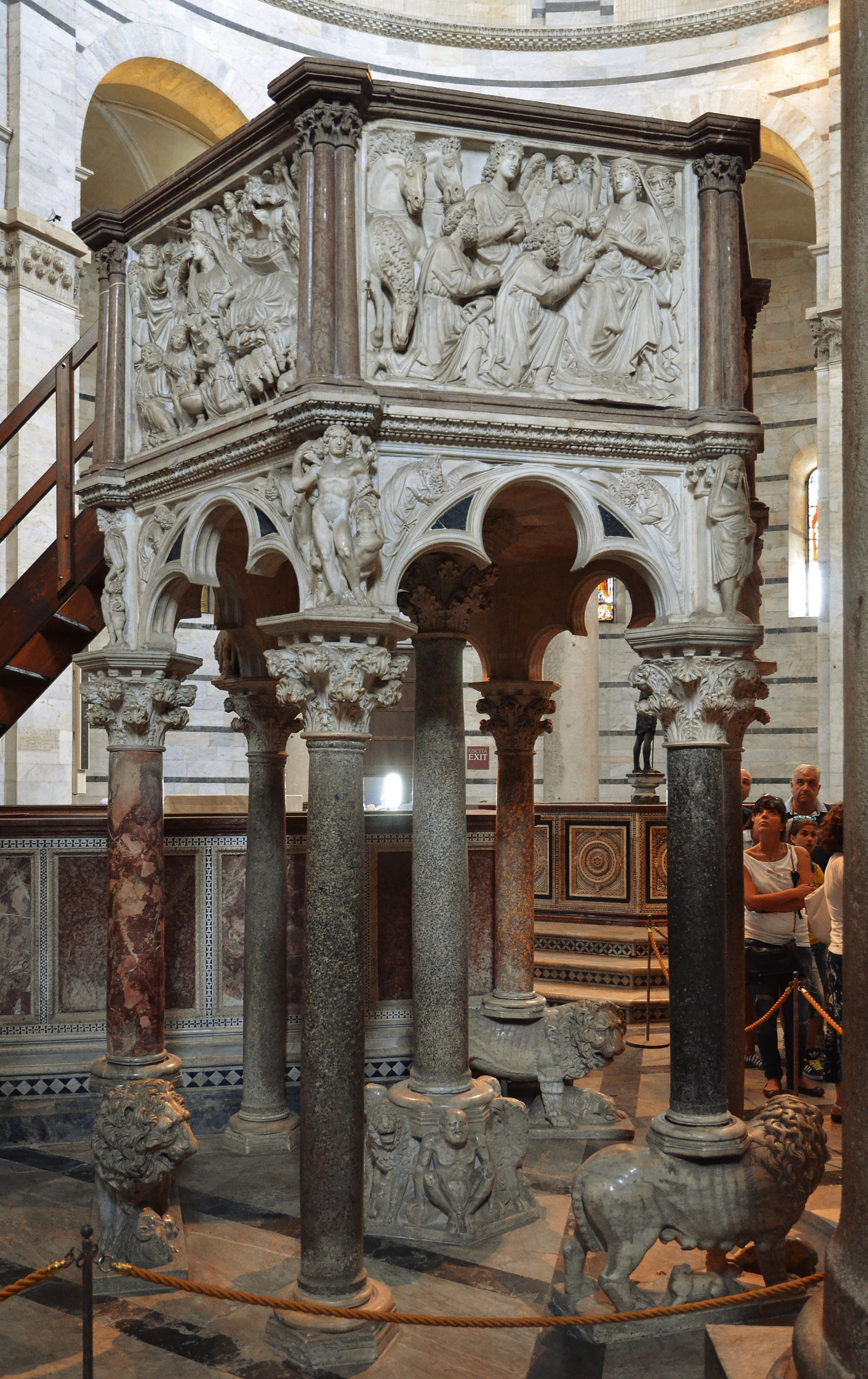
Marble pulpit by Nicola Pisano, 1260

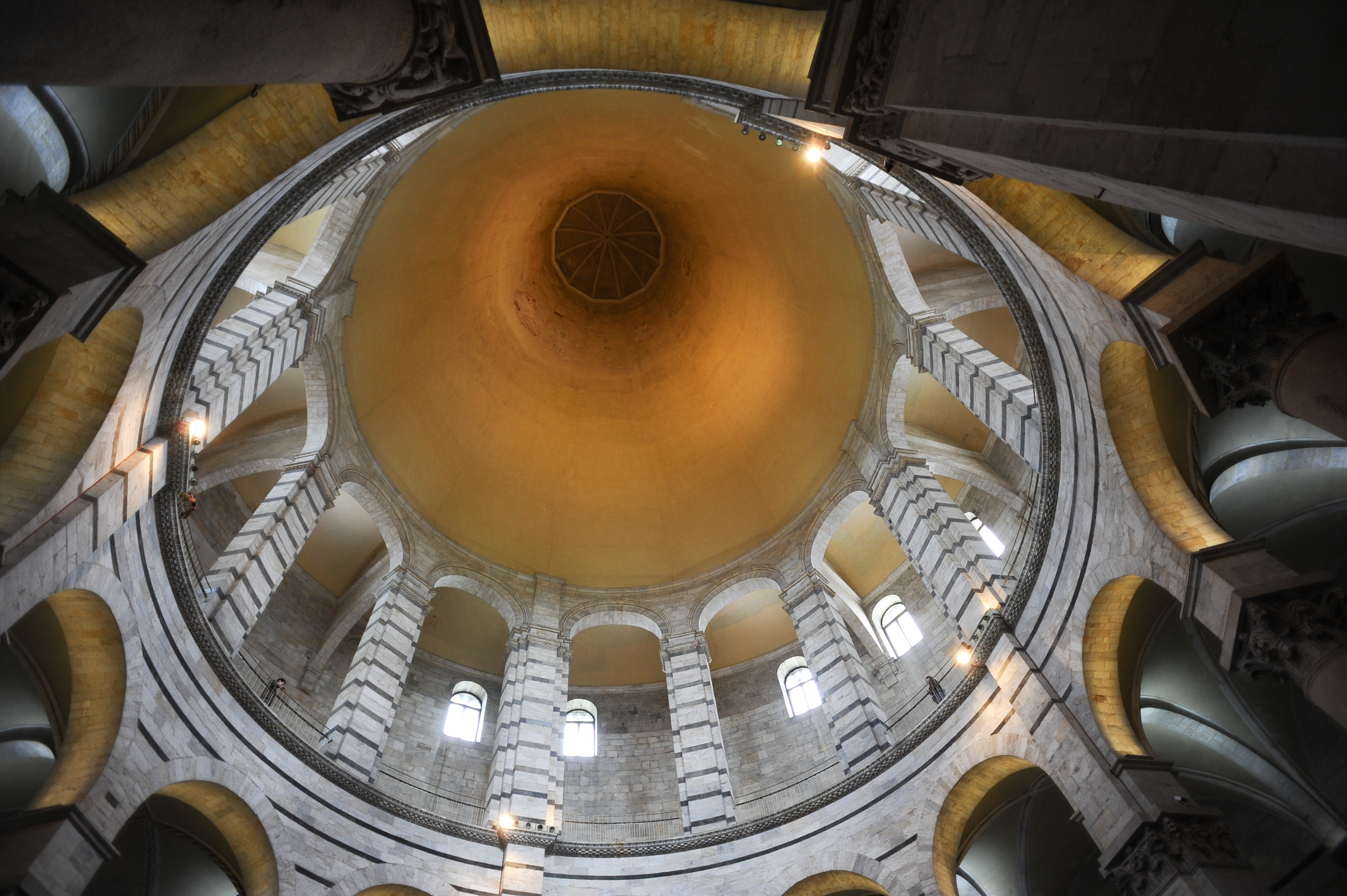
The dome seen from the inside

Acoustic resonance and reverberation demonstration

== See also ==
- Late medieval domes
- List of tallest domes
