= Diotisalvi =

12th-century Italian architect

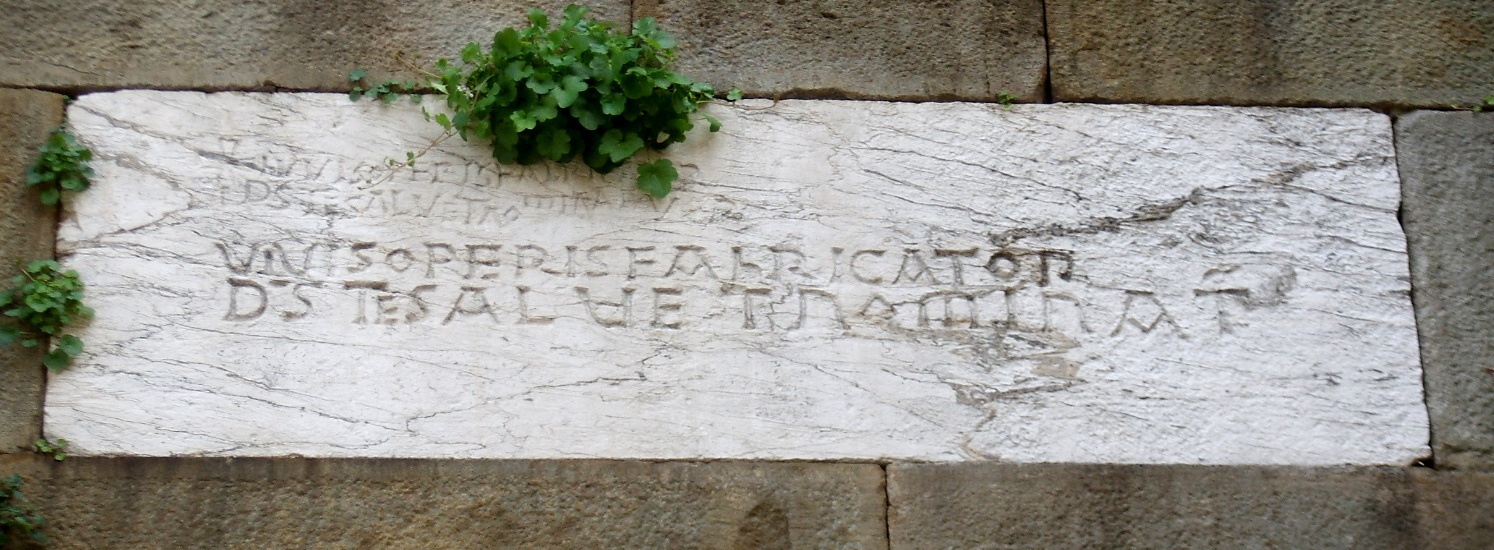
Holy Sepulcher, Pisa, inscription diotisalvi.JPG

Diotisalvi, also Deotisalvi or Deustesalvet, was an architect from Pisa, Italy, active in the 12th century in Pisa. Little is known of him.

== Career ==
=== Baptistry of Pisa ===
He is well known to be the original architect of the Baptistry of Pisa, in Piazza dei Miracoli, as we can read in the sign he left inside the building, with the date 1152 (1153 stile pisano):

MCLIII, MENSE AUGUSTI FUNDATA FUIT HAEC ECCLESIA
DEUSTESALVET MAGISTER HUIUS OPERIS

Although he did the original project, the present Baptistery was different from his idea. In fact, he constructed only the first part, the ground floor. The building was continued after his death by Nicola Pisano, a century after its foundation, and then completed by Giovanni Pisano. They changed many things in the final form of the building, which was intended to be simpler with no gothic cusps and no dome, just a small, and high, pyramidal roof. This was connected to the fact that he wanted to resemble the Anastasis in the basilica of the Holy Sepulchre in Jerusalem. Maybe Diotisalvi wanted to replicate his previous work of the church of Holy Sepulchre in Pisa, 40 years before.

=== Church of Santo Sepolcro in Pisa ===
The Church of Holy Sepulchre was built in the first part of the 12th century. There is proof that it existed in 1113. The church has an octagonal shape and a pyramidal roof. Inside the belltower, there is a sign where Deustesalvet claims to be the fabricator, i.e. constructor of the building. The inside was meant to resemble the Holy Sepulchre in Jerusalem, while the outside was meant to resemble the Dome of the Rock, also in Jerusalem, wrongly called for a long time by Europeans "Mosque of Omar", because at that time it was believed to be the Temple of Solomon. There are many churches in Europe dedicated to the Holy Sepulchre in an octagonal or circular shape. We can cite the one in Bologna, Italy, inside the complex of Santo Stefano, or the one in Cambridge, or the Temple Church in London, United Kingdom.

=== Professional title ===
He was fabricator in 1113, and magister in 1153. That means he refined his art in some school, maybe the construction works of the cathedral of Pisa.

=== Other possible works ===
He did some other works, but without signing them.

==== Chapel of Saint Agatha ====
The chapel of Saint Agatha, a small chapel behind the church of Saint Paul a Ripa d'Arno. The small building was maybe originally built in 1063 by the monks, but the present shape was by a Diotisalvi. The first certification of the existence of the chapel is in 1132, maybe after the architect worked on it. It is in the usual octagonal shape, with a pyramidal roof.

==== Bell tower of San Nicola ====
The bell tower of the church of St Nicholas has an octagonal shape and a pyramidal roof, as all the other buildings by Diotisalvi. It was built in 1170, although there are no proofs, but only hypotheses. The bell-chamber instead is hexagonal with one window in every side. Inside there is a winding staircase, with a wall only on the external part, unlikely the Leaning Tower of Pisa. It was separated from the nearby buildings in origin, and it is slightly tilting.

==== Leaning Tower of Pisa ====
Recent studies attribute by analogies also the famous Leaning Tower of Pisa (1173) to magister Diotisalvi. The shape, the construction, and the affinity with the belltower of St. Nicholas all bring to mind the work of Diotisalvi. Like the Baptistery, the tower was not completed by him; maybe, just like the Baptistery, Giovanni Pisano was the last architect. That should explain why there is no pyramidal roof like all the other buildings

== Notes ==
Many of his works have some defects in common: the church of Holy Sepulchre, the belltower of St. Nicholas and the Leaning Tower all lean (in particular the two towers), and all sunk a bit in the ground. This is mainly due to the nature of the ground in Pisa, but it is particularly notable in those buildings (there is another building in the city not made by Diotisalvi that has the same problem: the medieval church of St. Michele degli Scalzi).

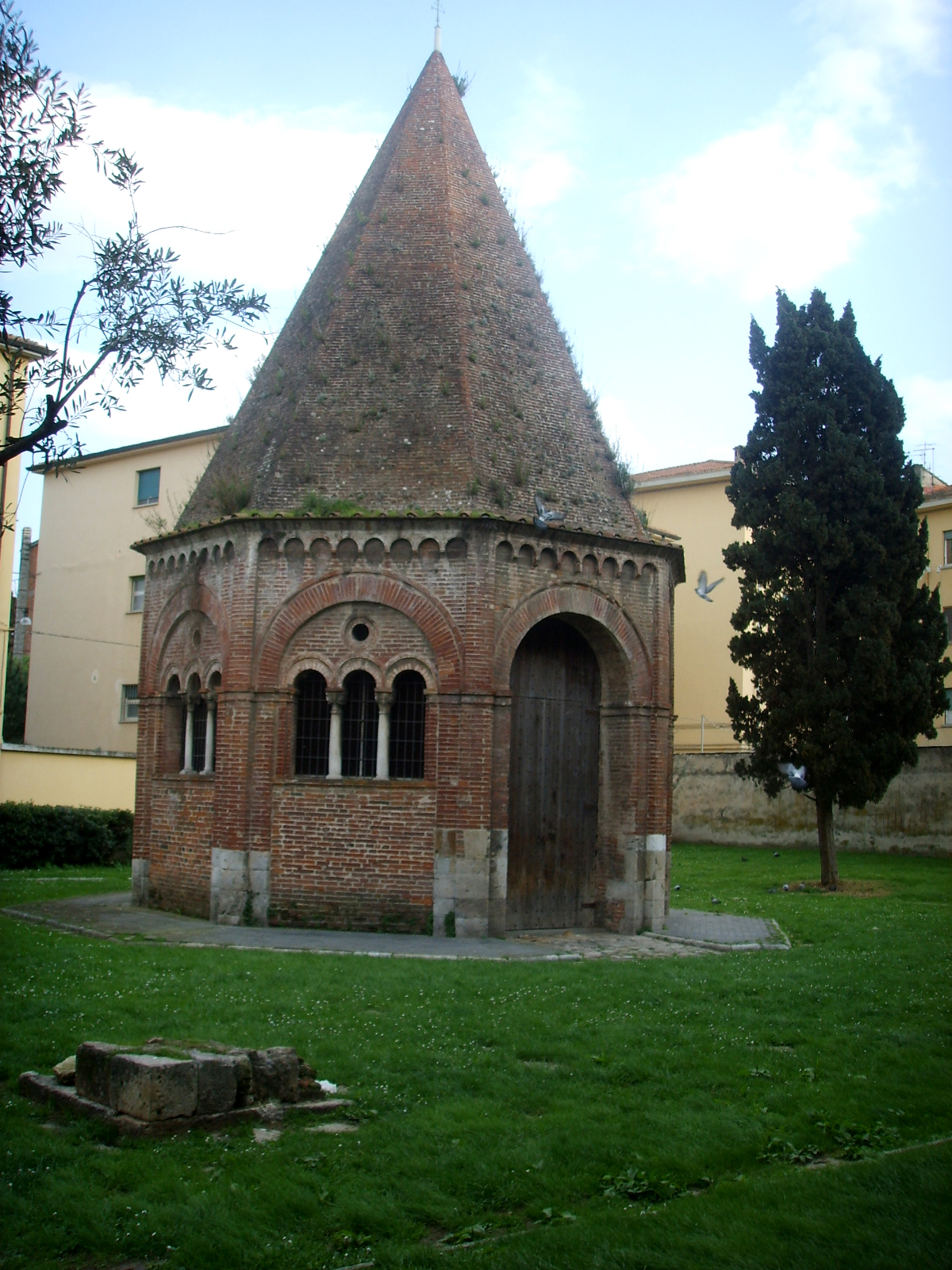
St. Agatha chapel

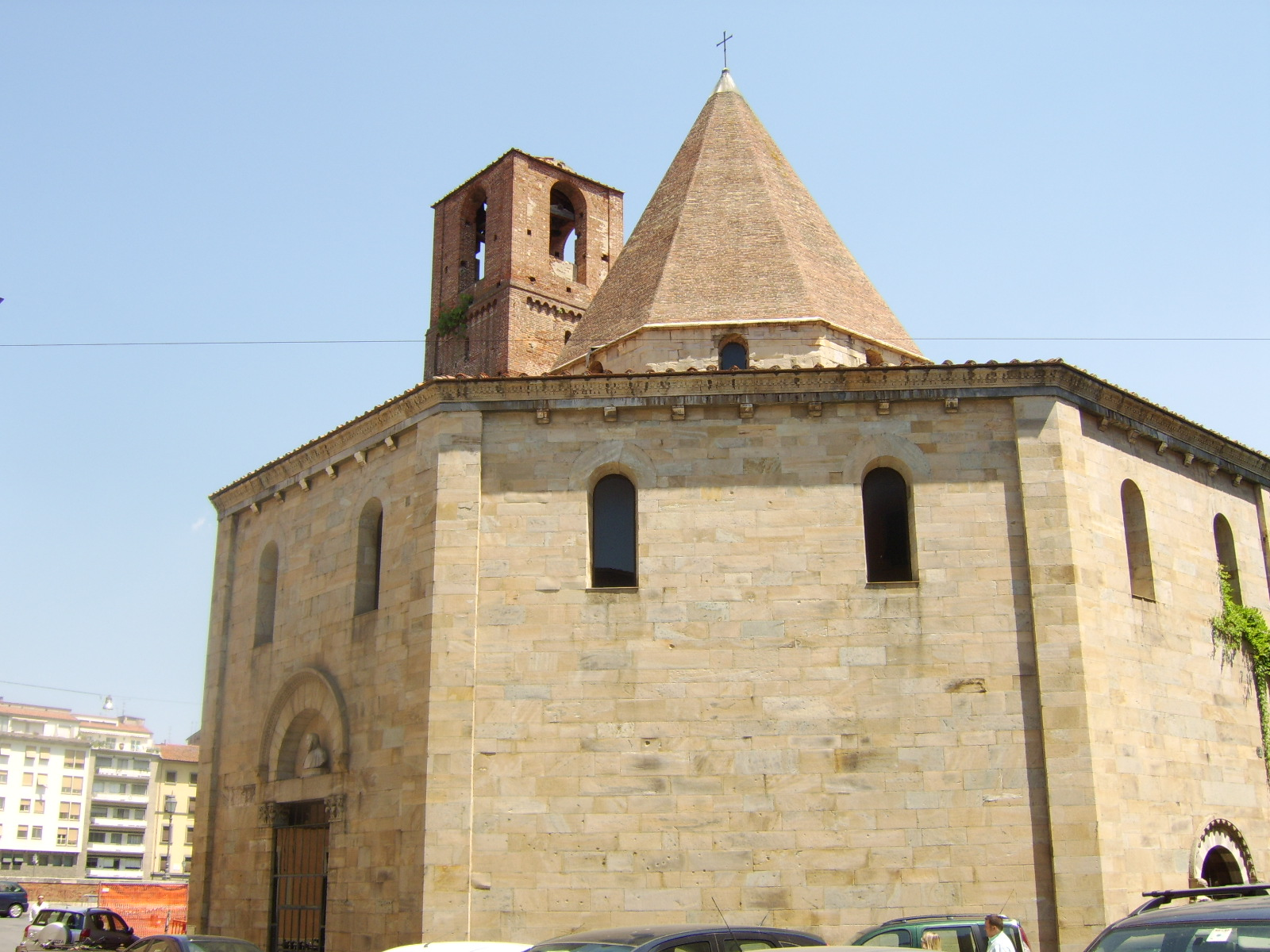
Church of the Holy Sepulchre

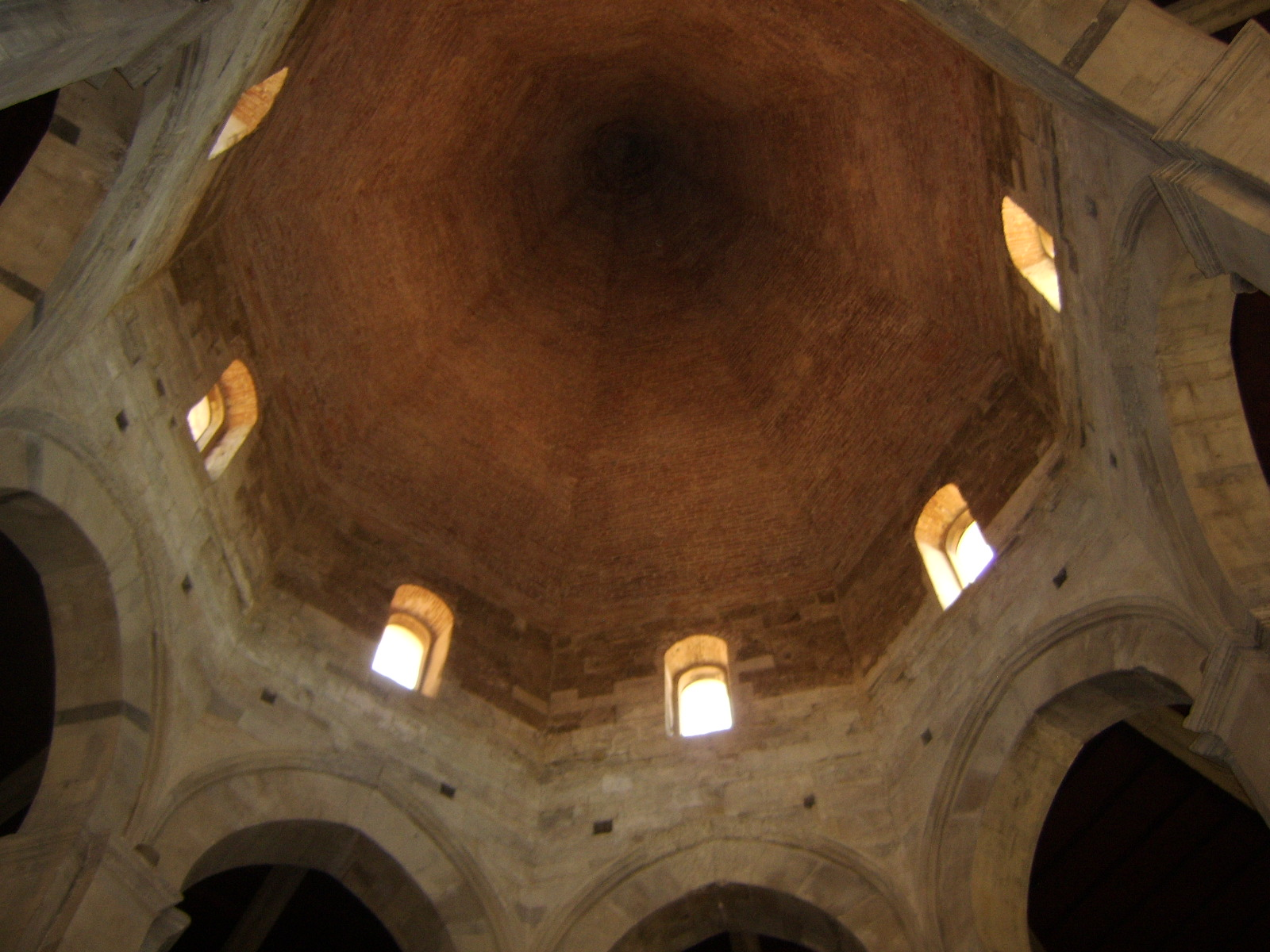
Inside view of the pyramidal cusp of the Holy Sepulchre

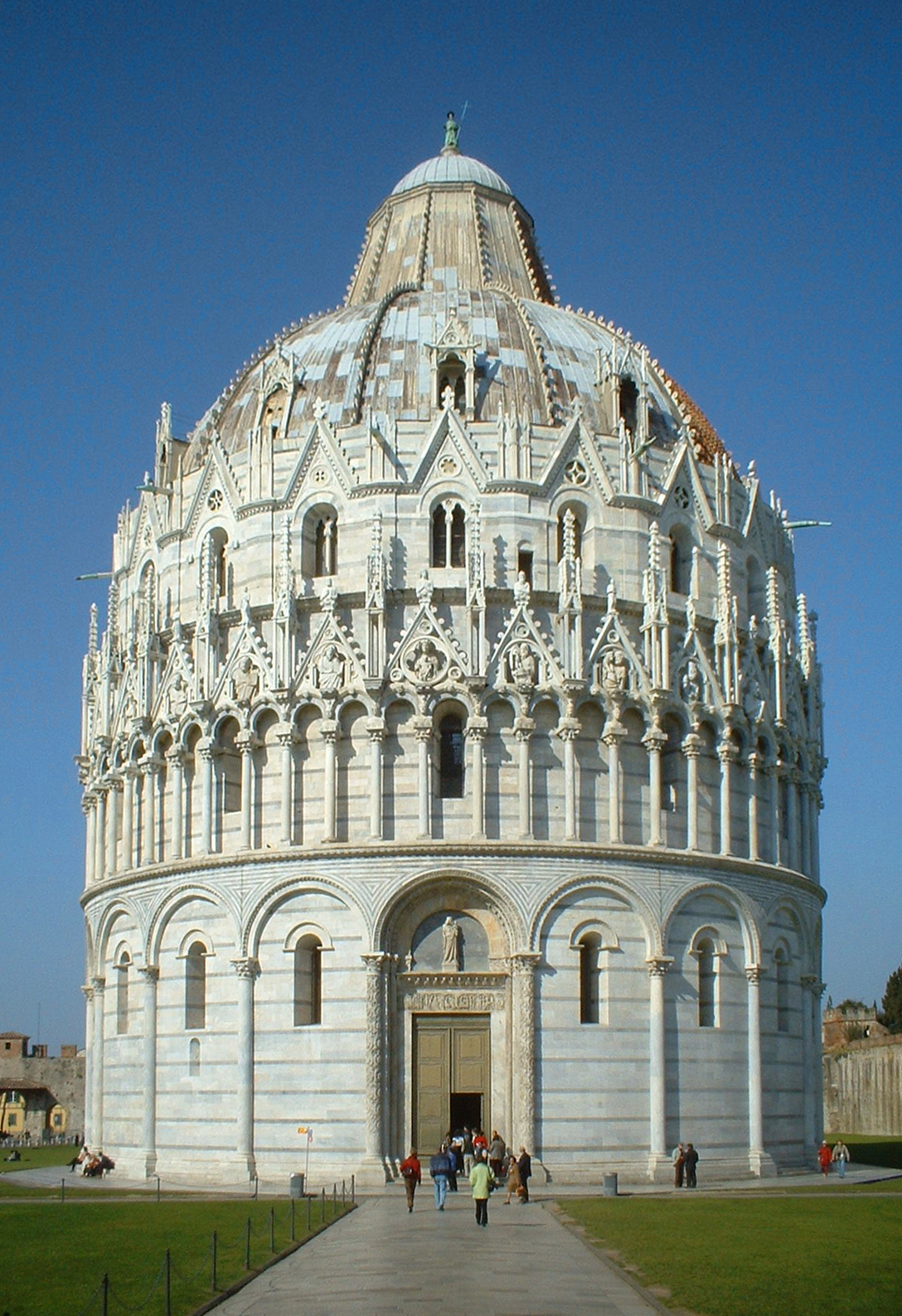
Baptistery of St. John

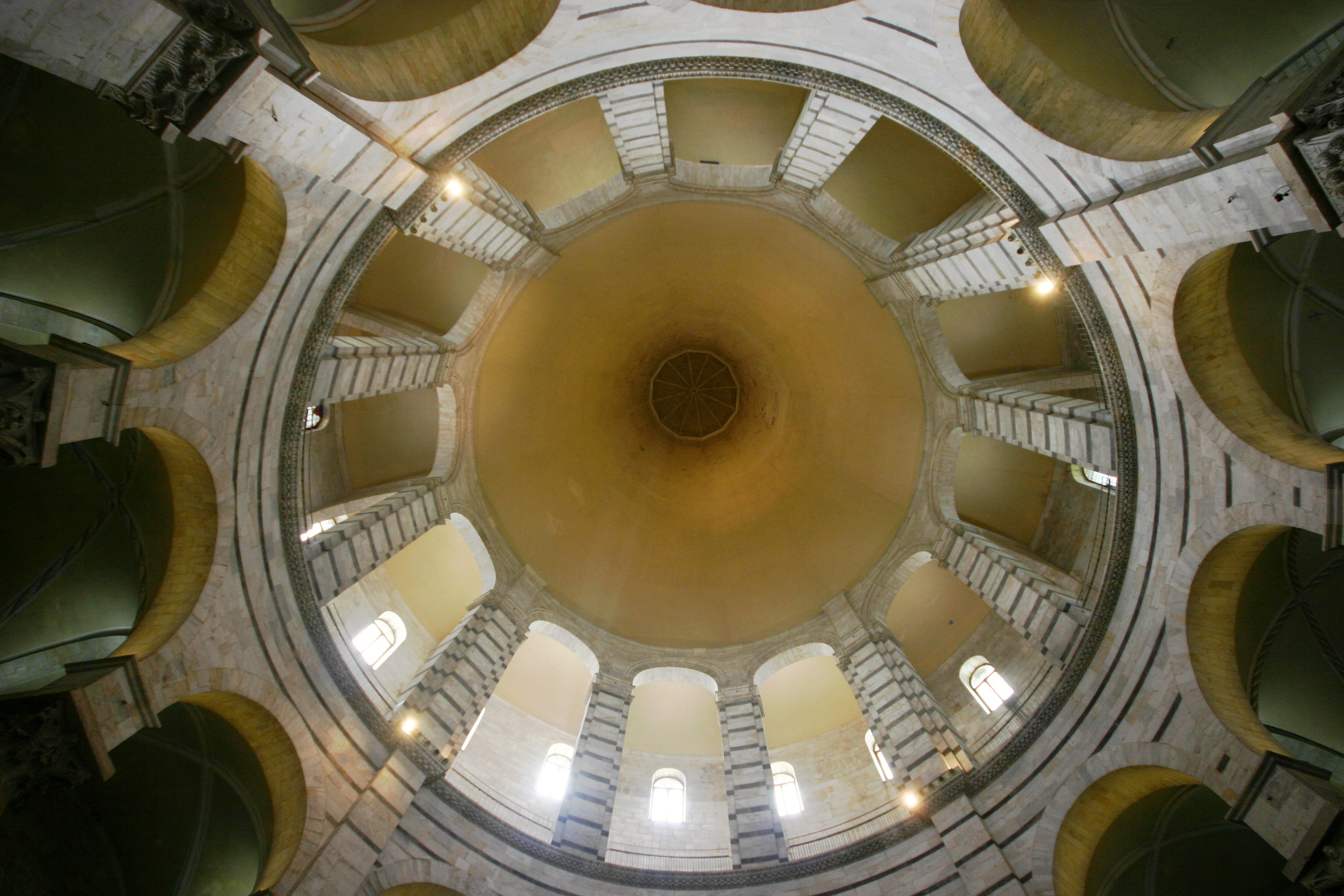
Inside view of the false dome of the Baptistery, with the internal conic cusp

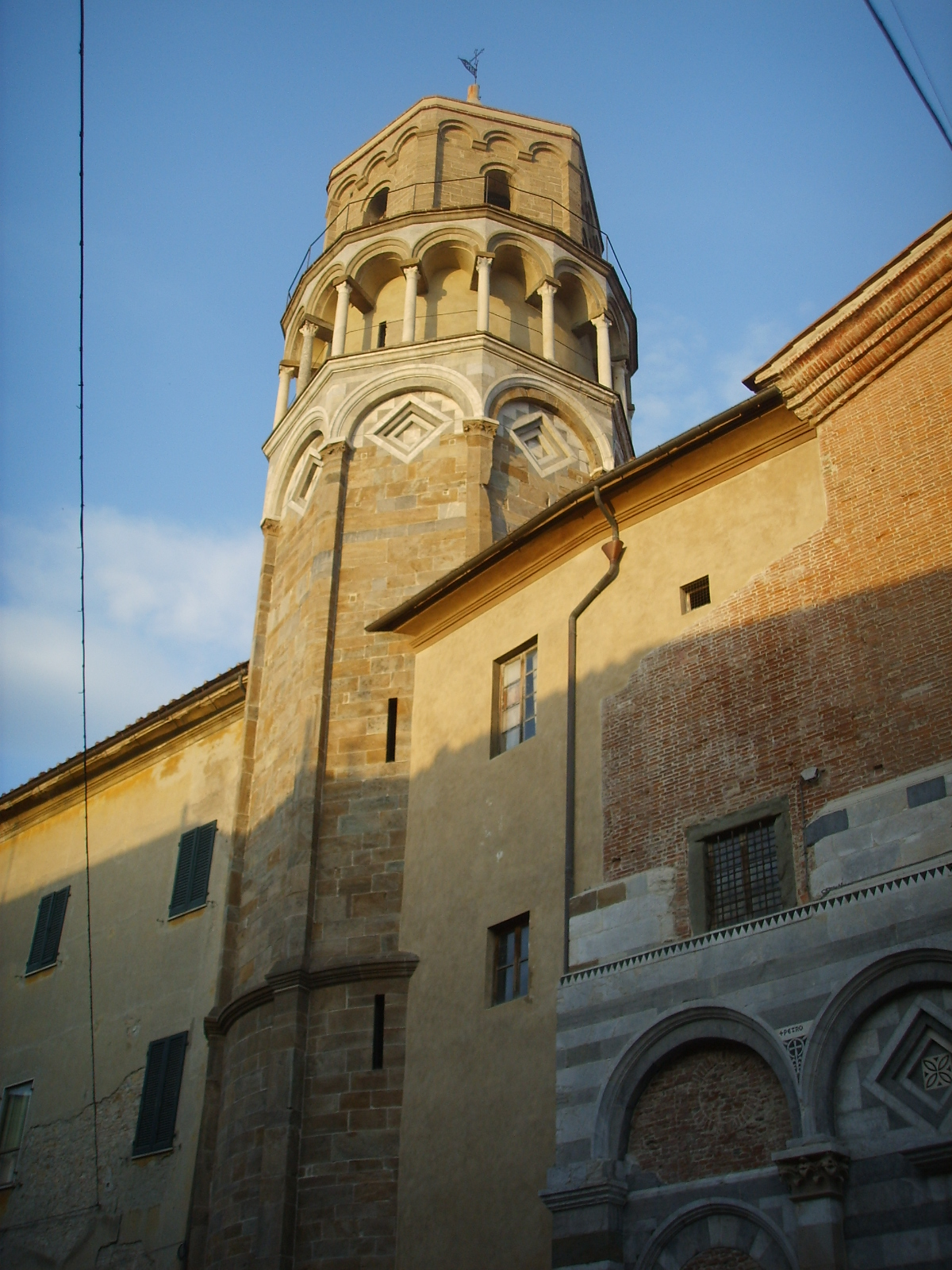
Belltower of St.Nicholas

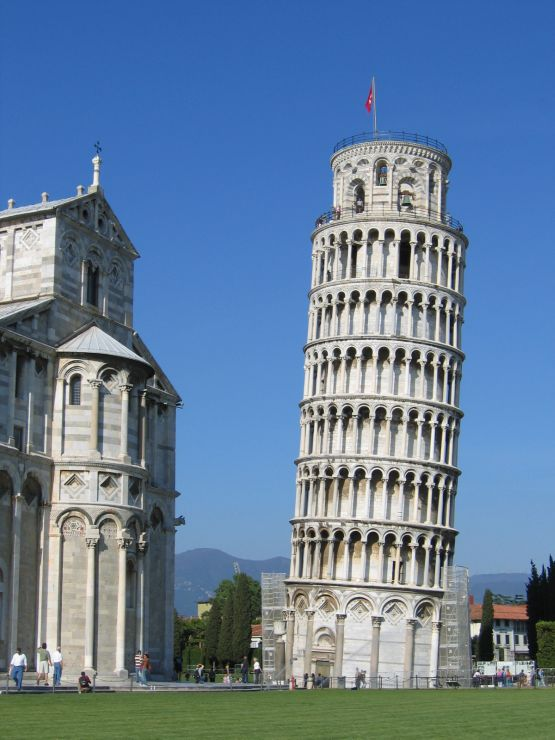
Leaning Tower of Pisa (attributed)

== Bibliography ==
- Piero Pierotti, Deotisalvi. Architetto pisano del secolo d'oro, Pacini editore, Pisa 2001 (Italian)
