= Round tower (disambiguation) =

Round tower may refer to:

== Types of tower ==
- A type of fortified tower with a circular floor plan
- Irish round tower, a type of early mediaeval stone tower
- Broch, a type of Iron Age drystone structure found in Scotland
- Round-tower church, a type of church found mainly in England
- Nuraghe, a type of megalithic edifice found in Sardinia, Italy
- Punic-Roman round towers, Malta

== Specific towers ==
- Nantyglo Round Towers, South Wales
- Newport Tower (Rhode Island), also known as Round Tower
- Rundetårn (meaning "Round Tower"), Copenhagen, Denmark
- Round Tower Lodge, Sandiway, Cheshire, England
- Round Tower (Portsmouth), a fortification built to guard the entrance to Portsmouth Harbour
- Round Tower (Vyborg), a fortification in Vyborg, Russia
- Monument tat-Tromba, a water tower in Ħamrun, Malta also known as the Round Tower

== Other uses ==
- Round Towers GAA Clondalkin, a Gaelic Athletic Association club based in Dublin, Ireland
- Round Towers GAA (Kildare), a Gaelic Athletic Association club based in Kildare Town, Ireland
