= Pisa Cathedral =

Medieval Catholic cathedral in Italy

Pisa Cathedral Primatial Metropolitan Cathedral of the Assumption of Mary
- "Il Duomo di Santa Maria Assunta"
- Pisa Cathedral, with the Leaning Tower in the background.
- Pisa Cathedral; Primatial Metropolitan Cathedral of the Assumption of Mary
- 43.723281°N 10.395845°E
- Location: Pisa
- Country: Italy
- Denomination: Catholic Church
- Sui iuris church: Latin Church
- Website: Official website

History
- Consecrated: 26 September 1118

Architecture
- Architect(s): Buscheto and Rainaldo
- Style: Pisan Romanesque
- Groundbreaking: 1064
- Completed: 1092

Administration
- Archdiocese: Pisa

UNESCO World Heritage Site
- Part of: Piazza del Duomo, Pisa
- Criteria: Cultural: (i), (iv)
- Reference: 395
- Inscription: 1987 (11th Session)

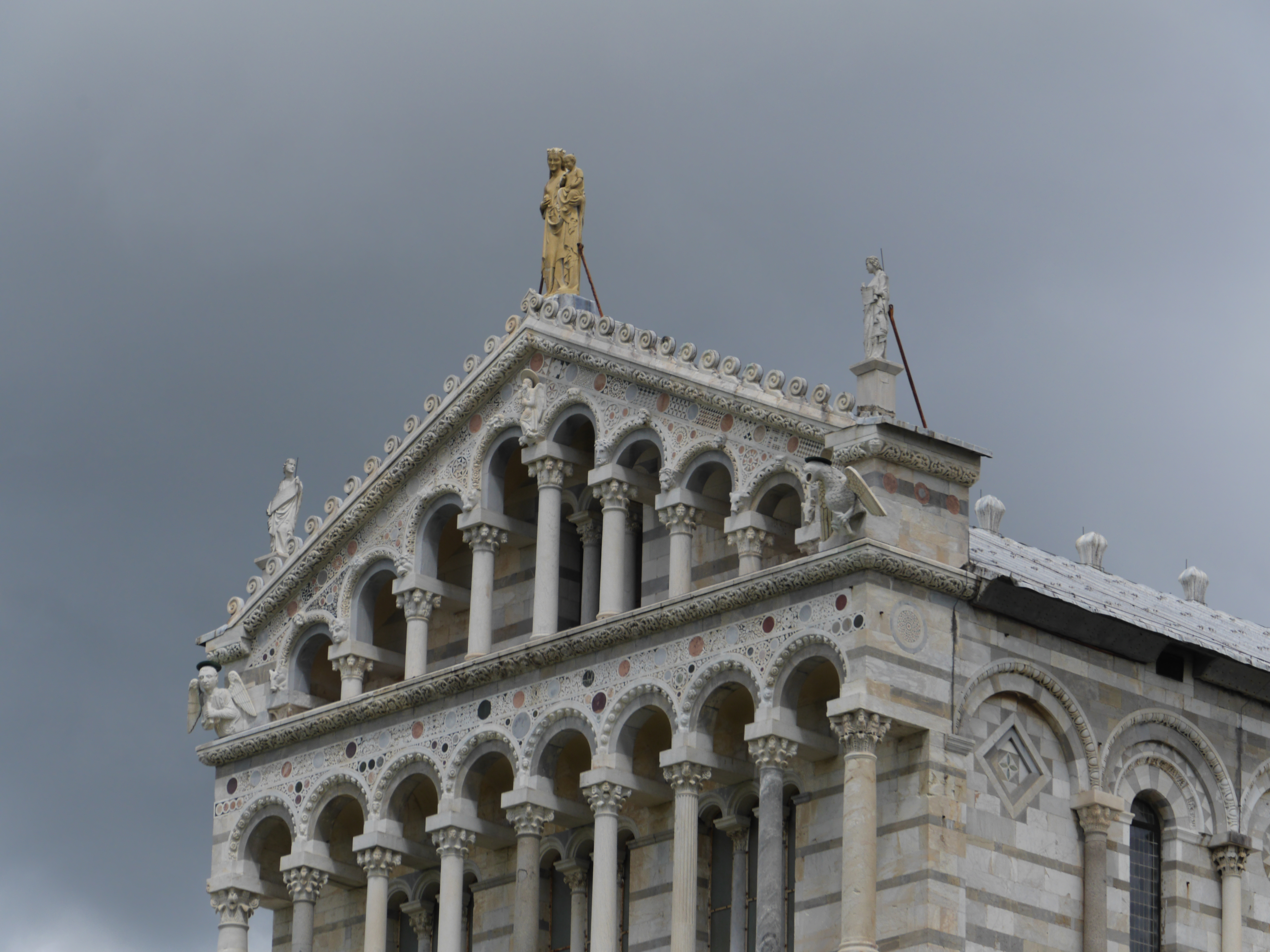
Detail of the façade of the cathedral

Pisa Cathedral (Italian: Duomo di Pisa), officially the Primatial Metropolitan Cathedral of the Assumption of Mary (Cattedrale Metropolitana Primaziale di Santa Maria Assunta), is a medieval Catholic cathedral dedicated to the Assumption of the Virgin Mary, in the Piazza dei Miracoli in Pisa, Italy, the oldest of the three structures in the plaza followed by the Pisa Baptistry and the Campanile known as the Leaning Tower of Pisa. The cathedral is a notable example of Romanesque architecture, in particular the style known as Pisan Romanesque. Consecrated in 1118, it is the seat of the Archbishop of Pisa. Construction began in 1064 and was completed in 1092. Additional enlargements and a new façade were built in the 12th century and the roof was replaced after damage from a fire in 1595.

== History ==
Construction on the cathedral began in 1064 by the architect Buscheto, and expenses were paid using the spoils received fighting against the Muslims in Sicily and Ifriqiya in 1064. It includes various stylistic elements: classical, Lombard-Emilian, Byzantine, and Islamic, drawing upon the international presence of Pisan merchants at that time. In the same year, St. Mark's Basilica began its reconstruction in Venice, evidence of a strong rivalry between the two maritime republics to see which could create the most beautiful and luxurious place of worship.

The church was erected outside Pisa's early medieval walls, to show that Pisa had no fear of being attacked. The chosen area had already been used in the Lombard era as a necropolis and at the beginning of the 11th century a church had been erected here, but never finished, that was to be named Santa Maria. Buscheto's grand new church was initially called Santa Maria Maggiore until it was officially named Santa Maria Assunta.

The structure was discovered during excavations in the early 2000s. The construction of the piece started in the late 11th century and consists of walls that contain blocks of calcarenite and marble.

In 1092 the cathedral was declared primatial church, archbishop Dagobert having been given the title of Primate by Pope Urban II. The cathedral was consecrated in 1118 by Pope Gelasius II, who belonged to the Caetani family which was powerful both in Pisa and in Rome.

In the early 12th century the cathedral was enlarged under the direction of architect Rainaldo, who increased the length of the nave by adding three bays consistent with the original style of Buscheto, enlarged the transept, and planned a new façade which was completed by workers under the direction of the sculptors Guglielmo and Biduino. The exact date of the work is unclear: according to some, the work was done right after the death of Buscheto about the year 1100, though others say it was done closer to 1140. In any case, work was finished in 1180, as documented by the date written on the bronze knockers made by Bonanno Pisano found on the main door.

The December 1187 papal election took place in Pisa Cathedral, with Paulino Scolari being elected Pope Clement III.

The structure's present appearance is the result of numerous restoration campaigns that were carried out in different eras. The first radical interventions occurred after the fire of 1595, following which the roof was replaced and sculptors from the workshop of Giambologna, among whom were Gasparo Mola and Pietro Tacca, created the three bronze doors of the façade. In the early 18th century began the redecoration of the inside walls of the cathedral with large paintings, the "quadroni", depicting stories of the blessed and saints of Pisa. These works were made by the principal artists of the era, and a group of citizens arranged for the special financing of the project. Successive interventions occurred in the 19th century and included both internal and external modifications; among the latter was the removal of the original façade statues (presently in the cathedral museum) and their replacement with copies.

Other notable interventions include: the dismantling of Giovanni Pisano's pulpit between 1599 and 1601 that only in 1926 was reassembled and returned to the cathedral (with some original pieces missing, including the staircase); and the dismantling of the monument to Henry VII made by Lupo di Francesco that was found in front of the door of San Ranieri and later substituted by a simpler, symbolic version.

== Description ==
The original building plan was a Greek cross with a grand cupola at the crossing, but today the plan is a Latin cross with a central nave flanked by two side aisles on each side, with the apse and transepts having three naves. The inside offers a spatial effect similar to that of the great mosques thanks to the use of raised lancet arches, the alternating layers of black and white marble, and the elliptical dome, inspired by the Moors. The presence of two raised matronea in the nave, with their solid, monolithic columns of granite, is a clear sign of Byzantine influence. Buscheto welcomed Islamic and Armenian influence.

=== Exterior ===
The rich exterior decoration contains multicolored marble, mosaic, and numerous bronze objects from the spoils of war, among which is the Pisa Griffin, now a copy. The arrival of the griffin in Pisa has been attributed to numerous Pisan military victories of the 11th and 12th centuries, including the 1087 Mahdia Campaign and the 1113–15 Balearic Expedition. The griffin was placed on a platform atop a column rising from the gable above the apse at the east end of the roof, probably as continuation of the original construction that started in 1064. In the early 19th century the original sculpture, which can now be seen in the cathedral museum, was removed from the roof and replaced with a copy. The high arches show Islamic and southern Italian influence.^{Ref?} The blind arches with lozenge shapes recall similar structures in Armenia.^{Ref?} The façade of grey and white marble, decorated with colored marble inserts, was built by Master Rainaldo. Above the three doorways are four levels of loggia divided by cornices with marble intarsia, behind which open single, double, and triple windows.

The cathedral was heavily damaged by a fire in 1595. The heavy bronze doors of the façade were newly designed, executed and completed in 1602 by sculptors from the circle of Giambologna on the expense of Ferdinando I de' Medici, the Grand Duke of Tuscany. At the top there is a Madonna and Child and, in the angles, the four evangelists. The tomb of Buscheto is found to the left of the north door of the façade.

Contrary to what might be thought, from the beginning the faithful entered the cathedral through the Gate of Saint Rainerius, found in the south transept of the same name, which faces the bell tower. For townsfolk approaching by via Santa Maria it was the shortest way to enter the cathedral. The door wings were cast about 1180 by Bonanno Pisano, and it is the only door not destroyed in 1595. The 24 bronze reliefs show stories of the New Testament. This bronze portal is one of the first produced in Italy during the Middle Ages, and is a forerunner of the bronze doors created by Andrea Pisano for the Baptistery in Florence (1329–1336).

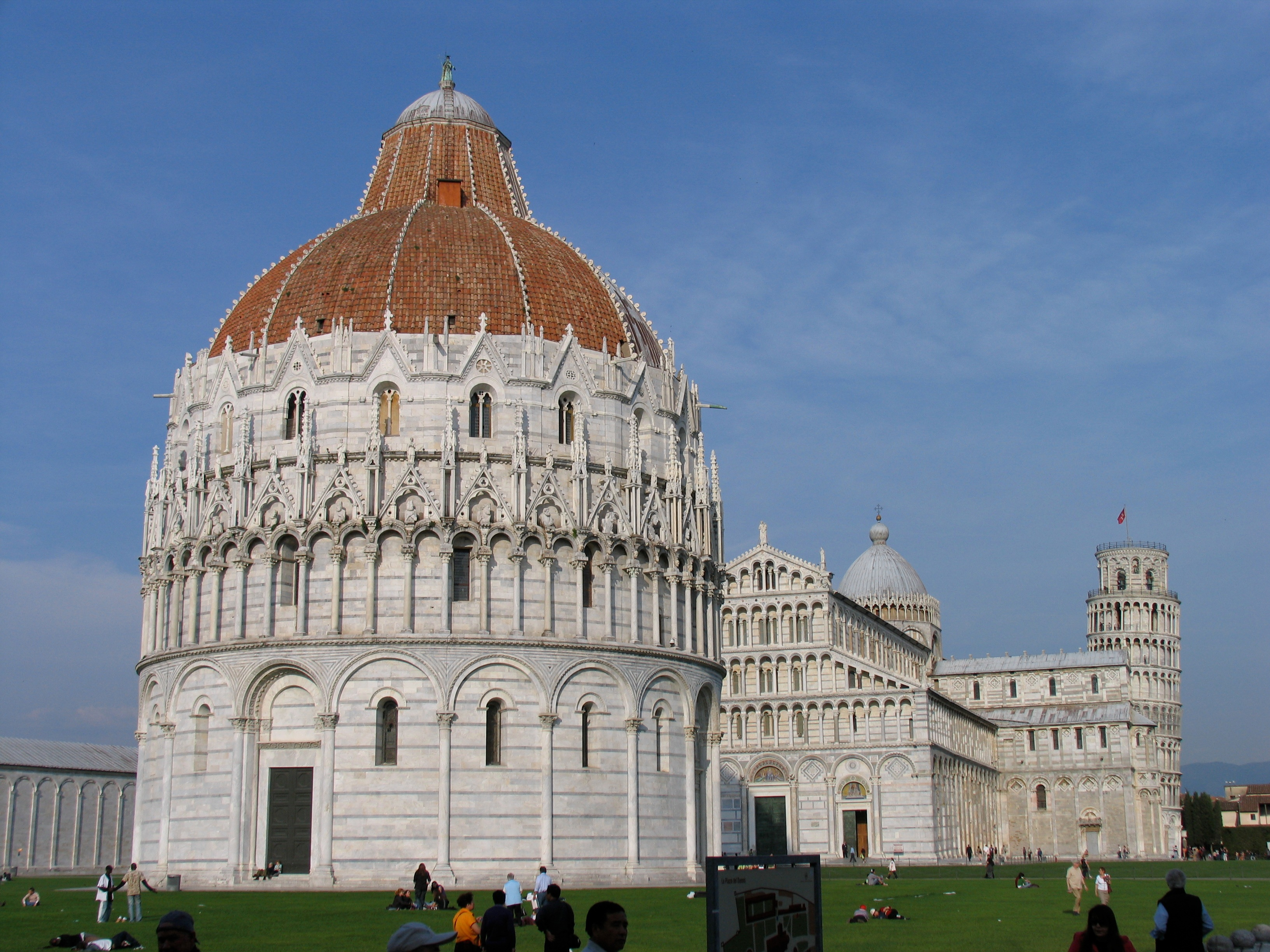
The Pisa Baptistery with the Cathedral, Leaning Tower, and Camposanto

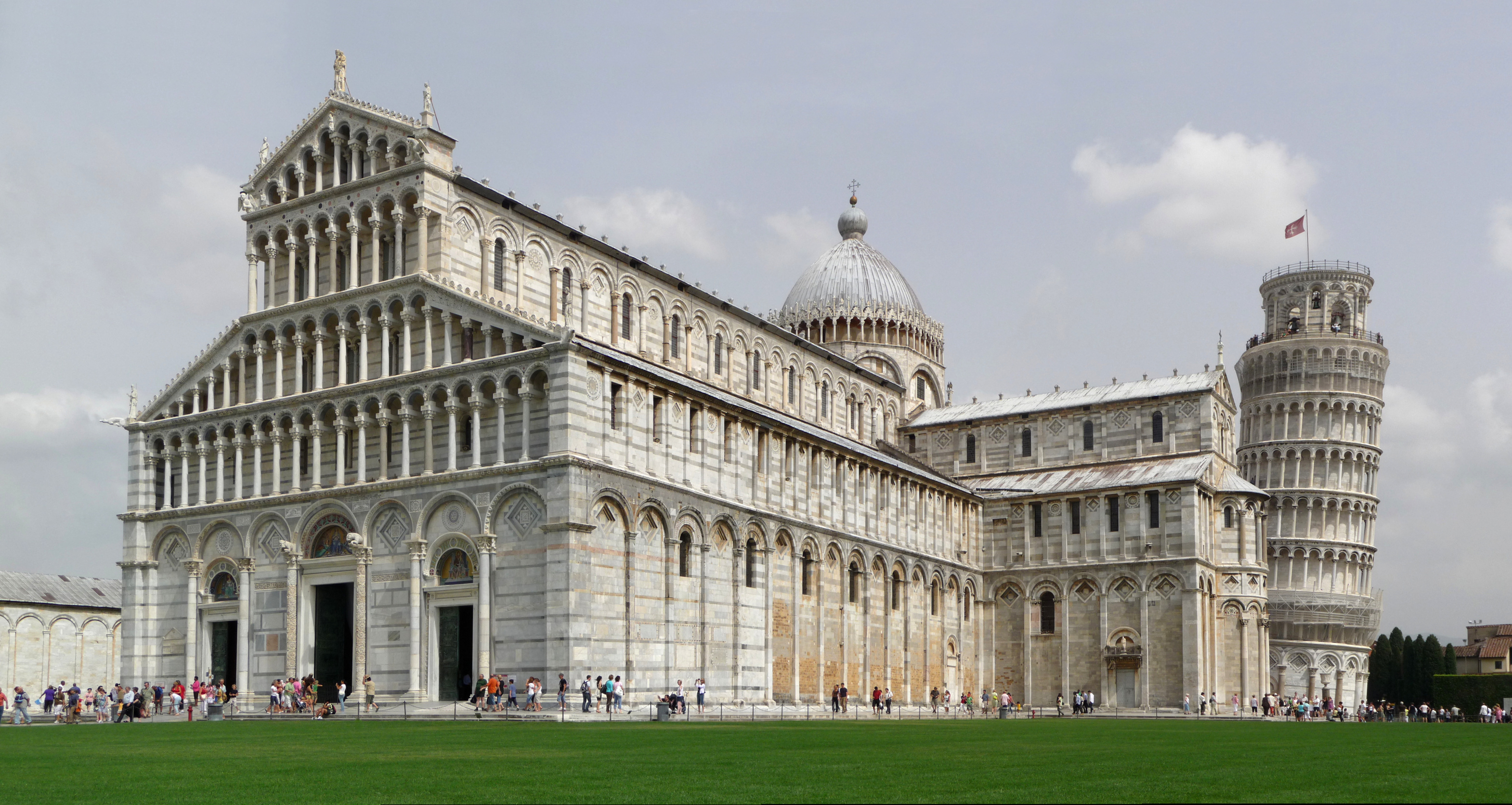
The cathedral, with the Leaning Tower of Pisa.

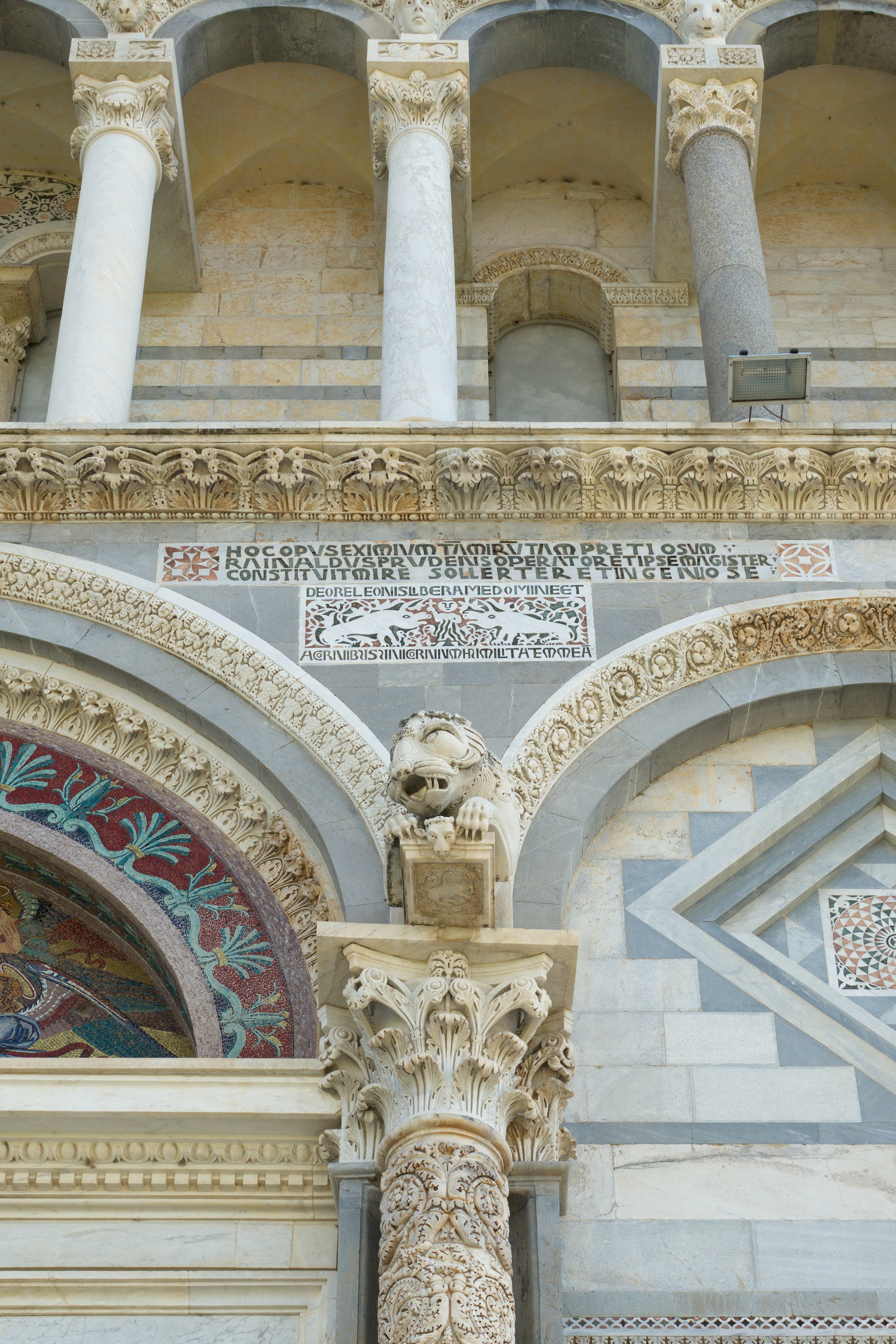
Detail of the west façade to the right above the main portal. The inscription above the picture quotes Psalm 22:21: "From the lion's mouth deliver me, Lord"

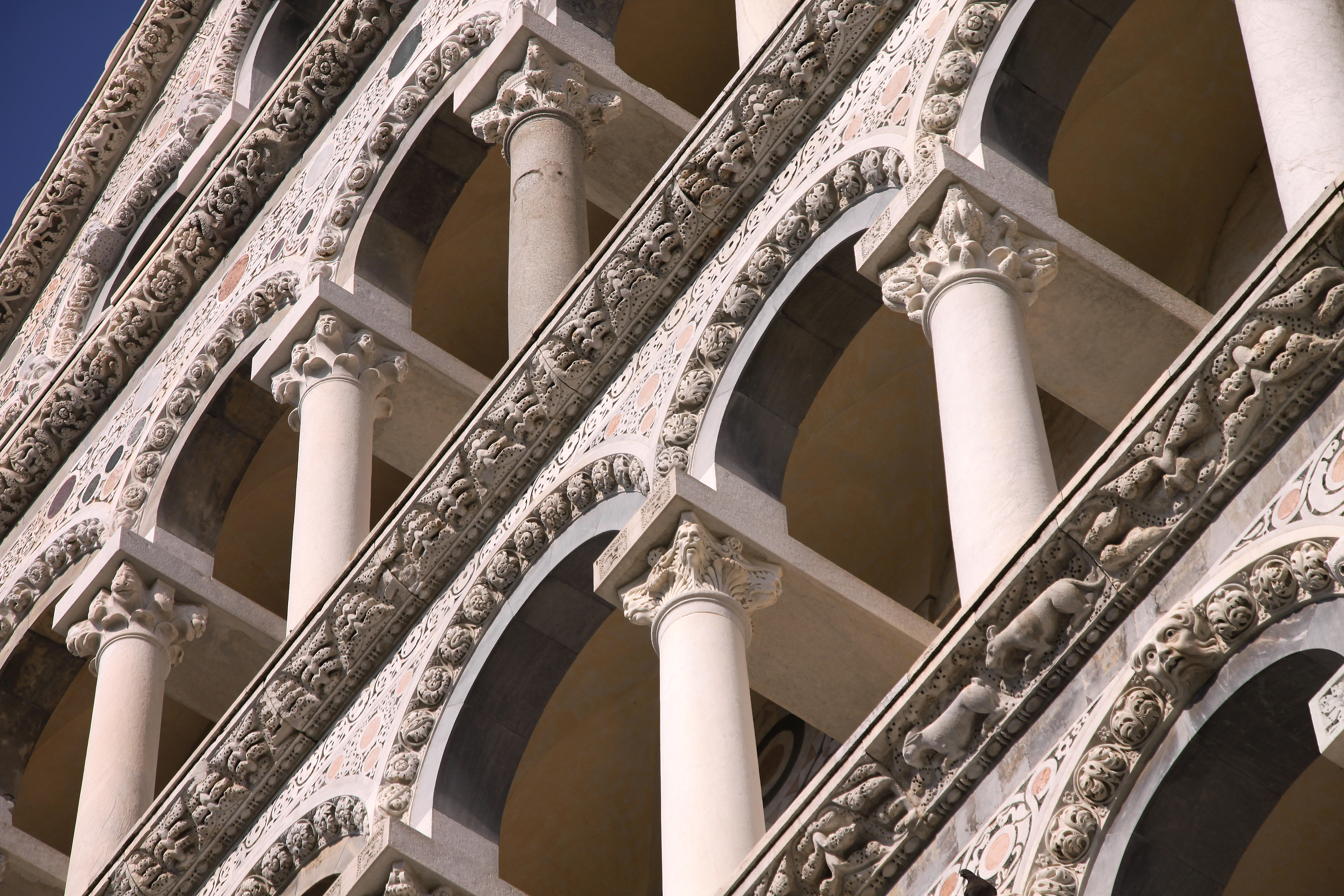
Detail of columns on the west façade

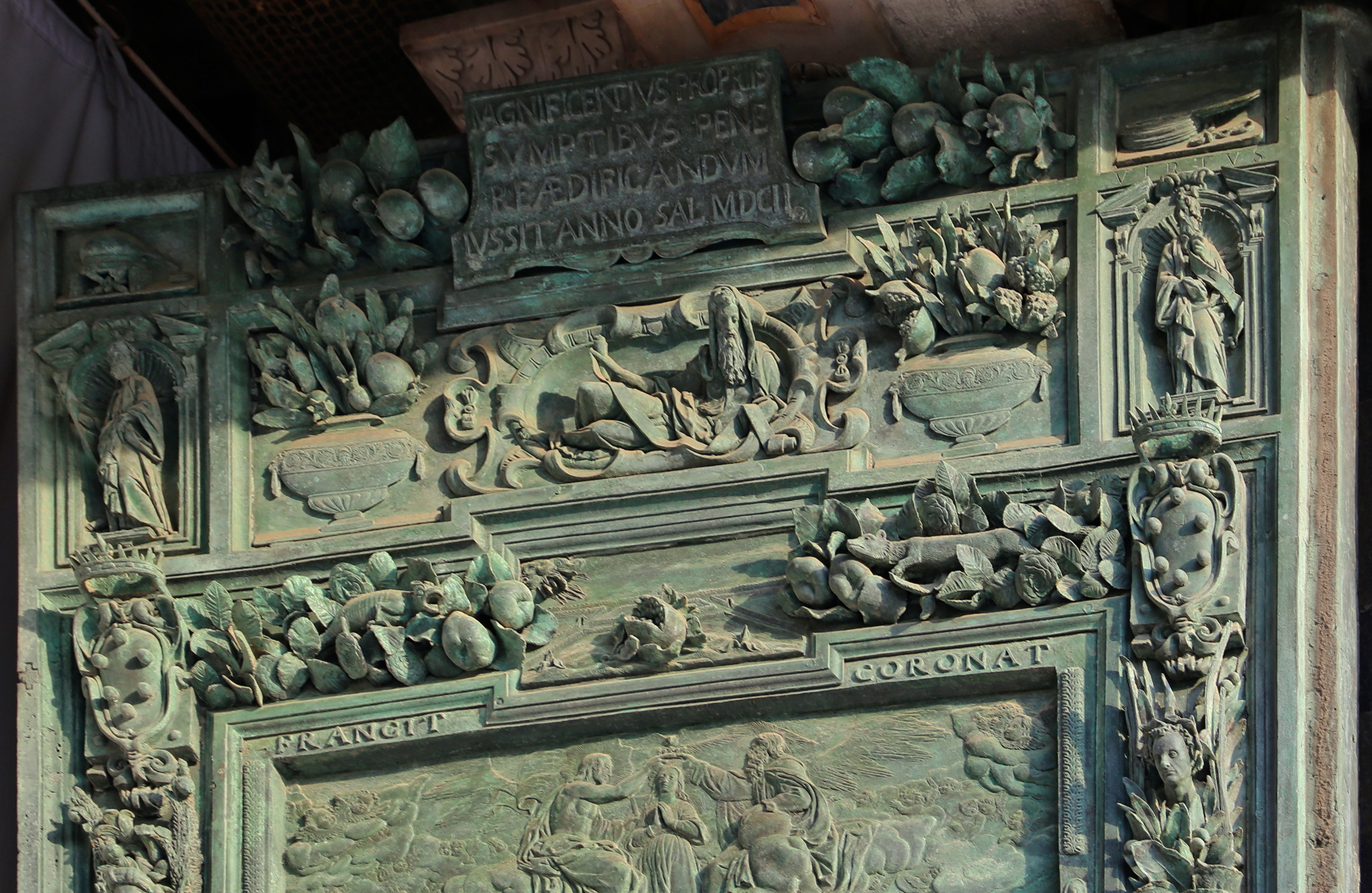
Upper right wing of the central door with Latin inscription: "He ordered it to be rebuilt in a more magnificent manner at his own expense in the year 1602"

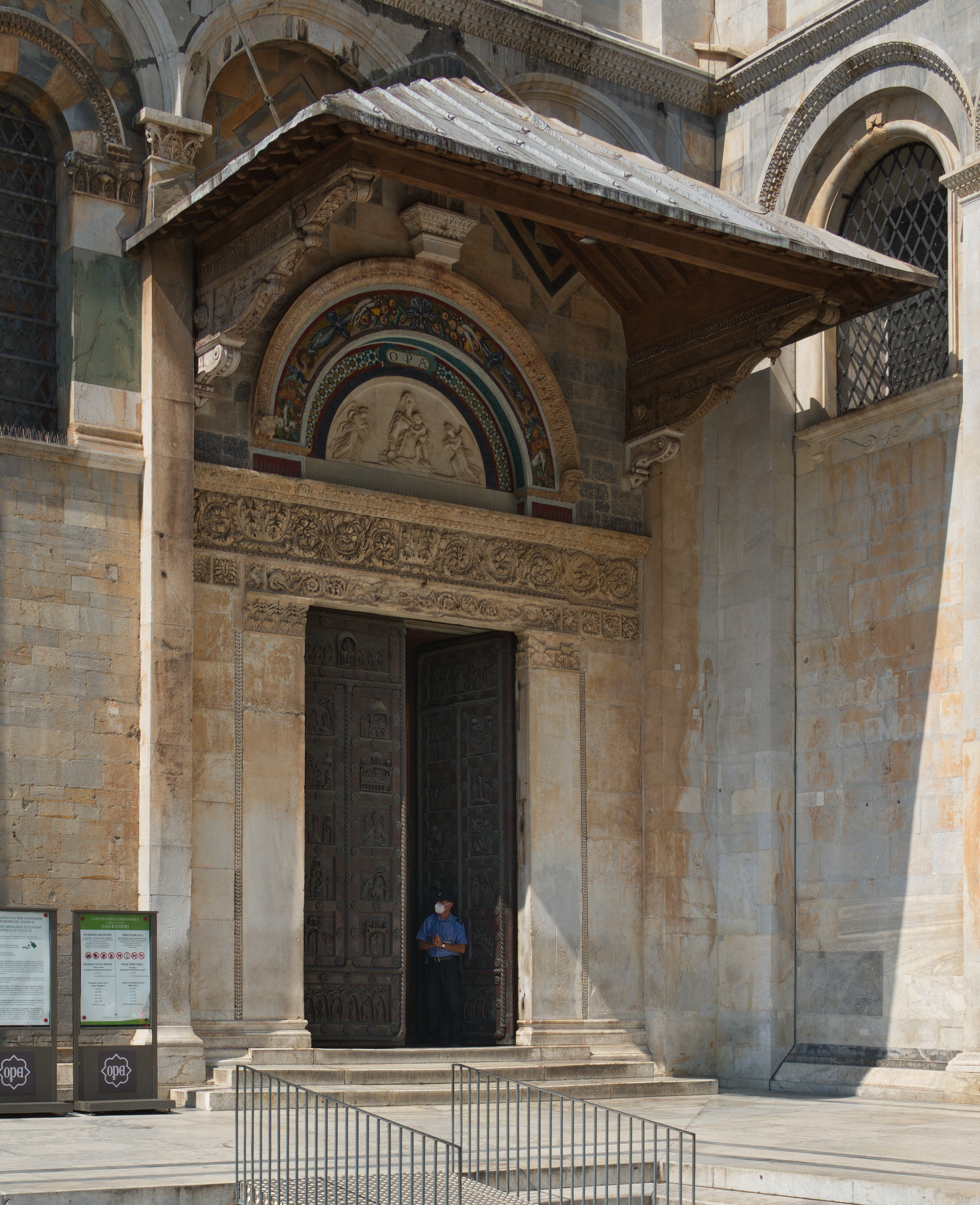
Door of St. Ranier

=== Interior ===
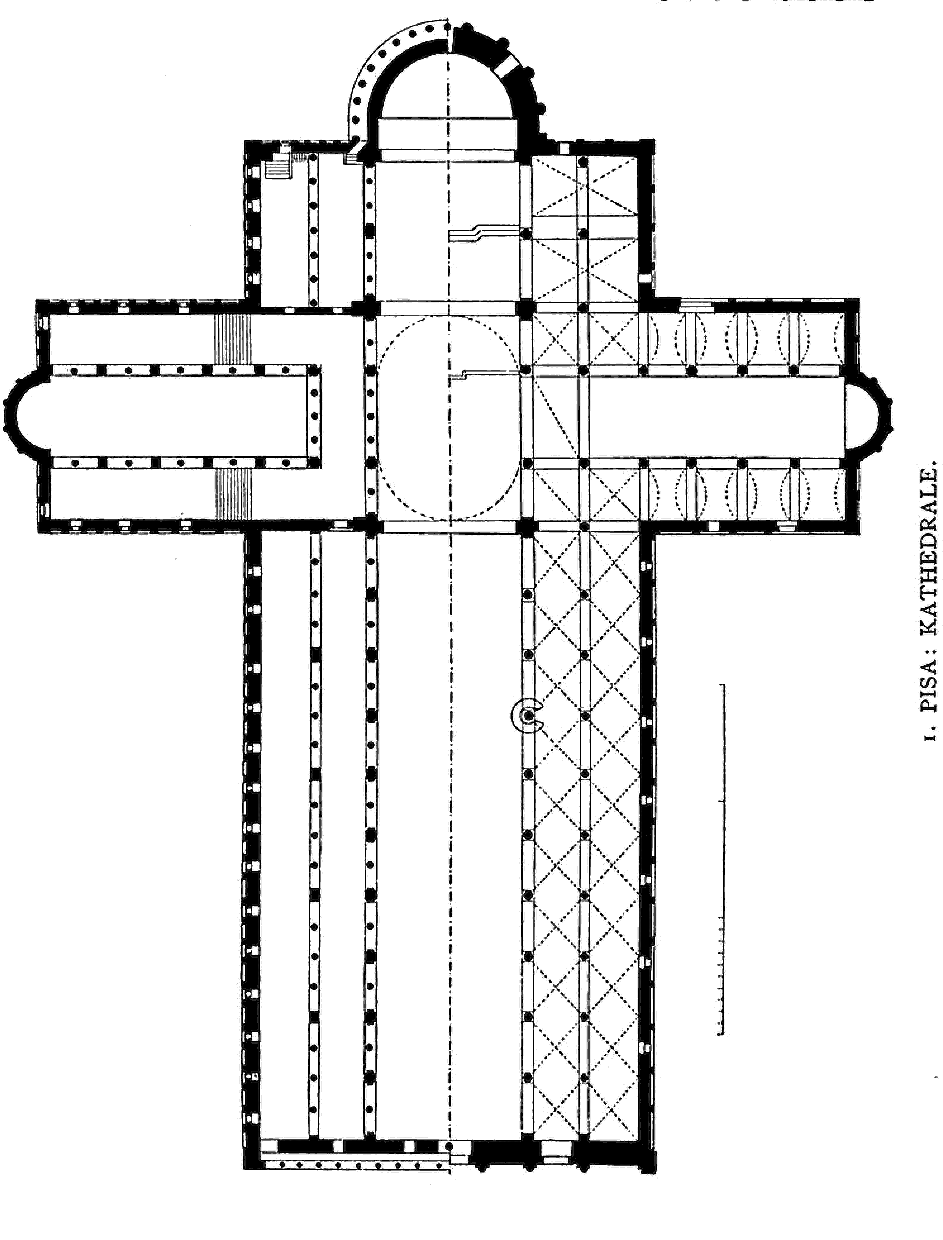
Floor plan

The interior, subdivided at the front into a central nave flanked by two side aisles on either side and with the transept and apse in three naves, is covered with white and black marble, with monolithic grey marble columns having corinthian capitals. It has a wooden 17th-century coffered ceiling, painted and decorated with gold leaf, made by Domenico and Bartolomeo Atticciati; it bears the Medici coat of arms. Presumably the earlier ceiling was a structure with wooden trusses.

The inside of the dome, found where the central nave and the transepts cross, is decorated using a rare painting technique called encaustic and depicts the Virgin in glory with saints by the Pisan artists Orazio and Girolamo Riminaldi (1627–1631). Restoration of the dome began in 2015 and concluded in 2018.

The granite Corinthian columns between the nave and the apse come from the mosque of Palermo, and are Pisan spoils retained in 1064 after a successful joint attack with the Normans on the Muslims in that city.

The large mosaic of Christ Enthroned with the Virgin and Saint John in the apse is famous for the face of Saint John, executed by Cimabue in 1302, which miraculously survived the fire of 1595. This is the last work by Cimabue and the only work of his for which we have certified documentation. The work evokes the mosaics of the Byzantine and Norman churches found in Cefalù and Monreale in Sicily. The mosaic, in large part made by Francesco da Pisa, was brought to completion by Vincino da Pistoia with the Madonna on the left-hand side (1320).

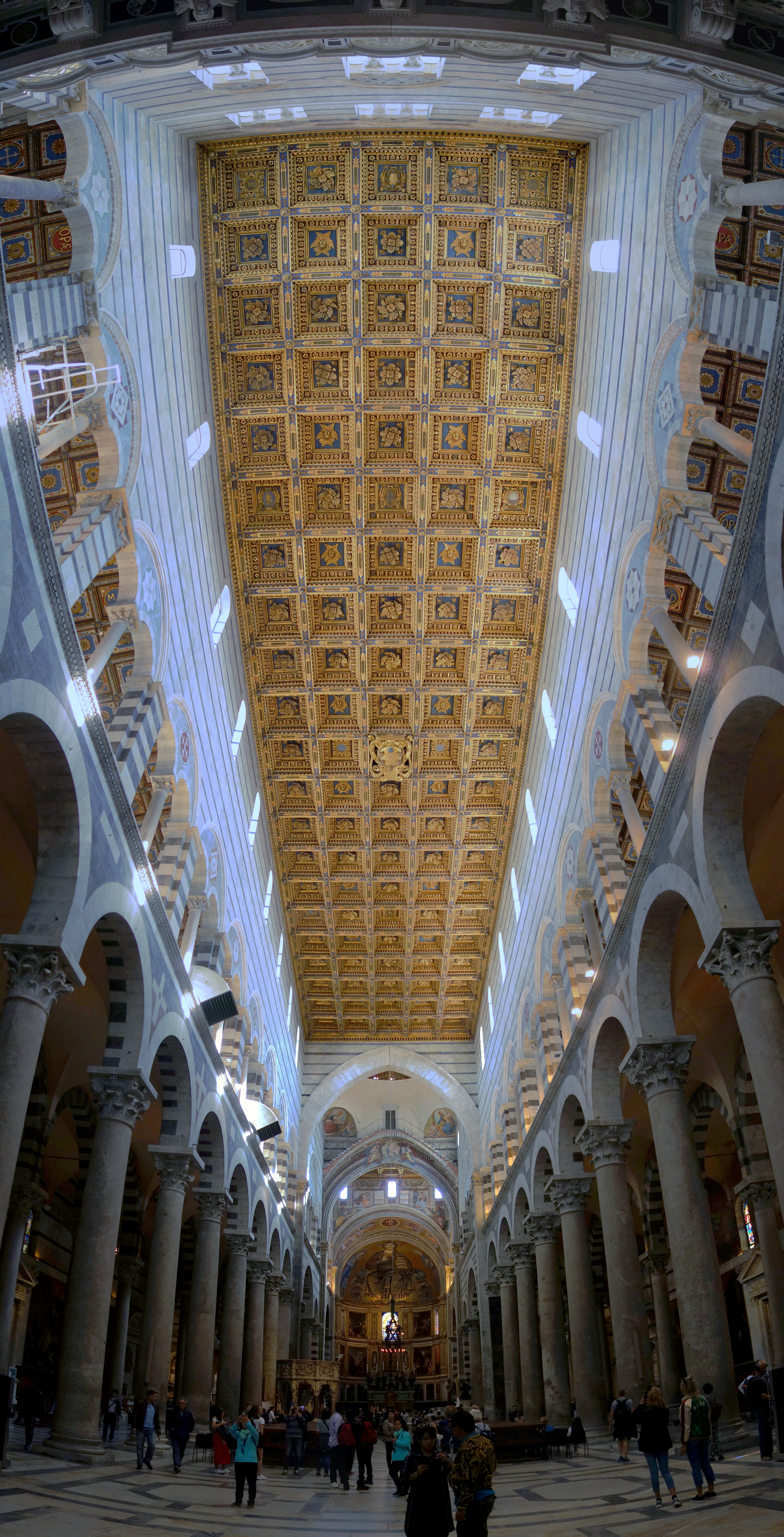
View down the nave with its coffered ceiling toward the sanctuary

Among the medieval works that avoided destruction during the fire of 1595 are the fresco of the Madonna with Child in the triumphal arch by the Pisan artist Maestro di San Torpè, as well as the cosmati pavement, work rarely found outside of Lazio. It was made using inlaid marble to create geometric patterns (mid-12th century). Other fresco fragments from the late medieval period have survived, among which is Saint Jerome on one of the four central pylons, as well as Saint John the Baptist, a Crucifixion, and Saints Cosmas and Damian on one of the pylons near the entrance, partially hidden by the entry way.

==== The pulpit ====
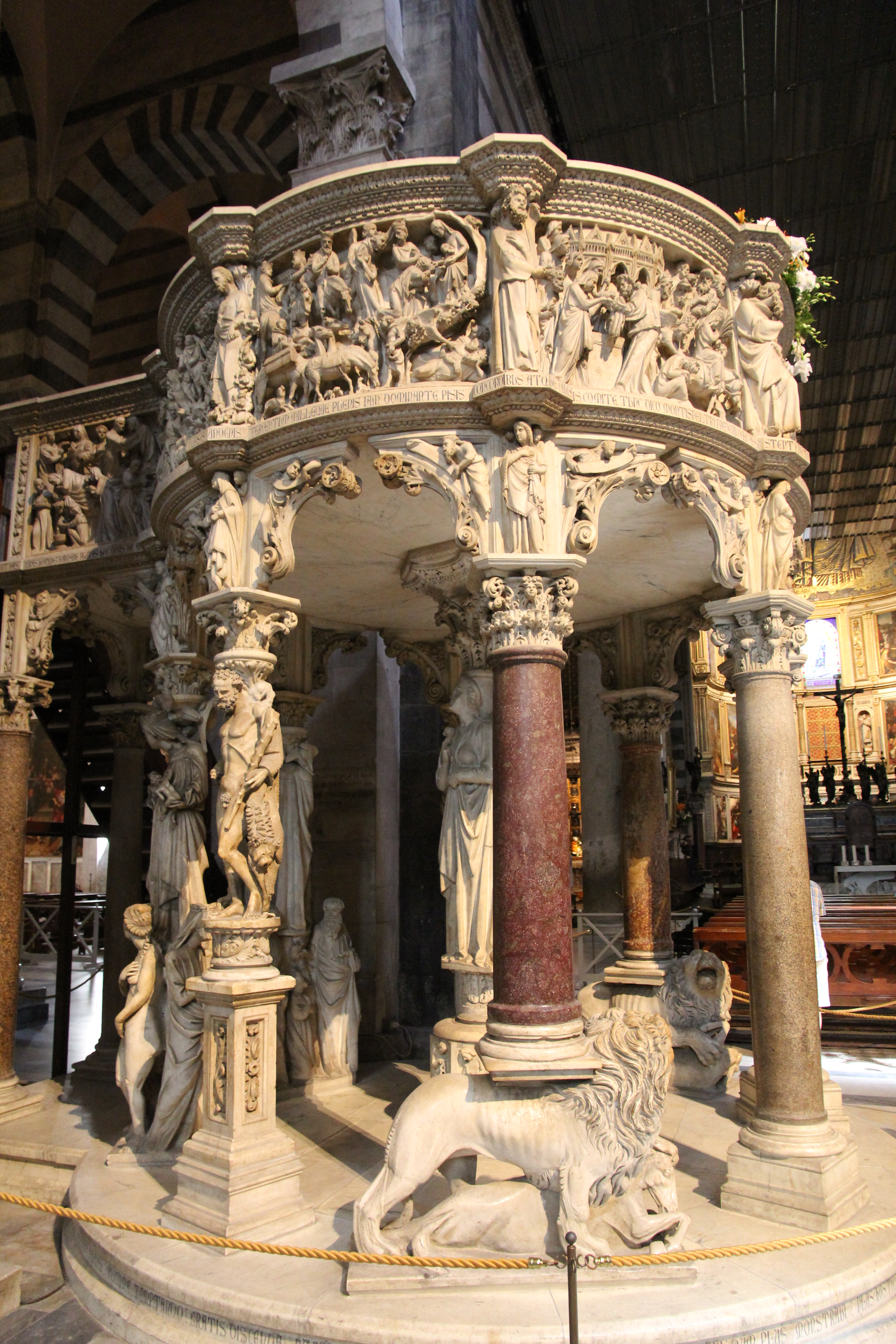
Pulpit by Giovanni Pisano

The pulpit, a masterpiece made by Giovanni Pisano (1302–1310), survived the fire but was dismantled during the work of restoration and was not reassembled until 1926. With its intricate architecture and its complex sculptural decoration the work presents one of the most sweeping narratives of the 13th-century imagination and reflects the religious renewal and fervor of the era. On the slightly curved panels are sculpted with an expressive language the episodes of the life of Christ. The structure is polygonal (as in similar pulpits in the pulpit in the Pisa Baptistery by Giovanni's father Nicola Pisano (1260), in the Siena Cathedral Pulpit, and in Giovanni's pulpit of Sant' Andrea, Pistoia; but this is the first example in a work of this type in which the panels are slightly curved. Other features include:

the presence of caryatids, sculpted figures in place of simple columns, that symbolize the Virtues; the use of scrolled 'shelving' in place of arches to support the raised platform; the sense of movement given by the numerous figures that fill up every empty space. For these qualities united to the skillful narrative art of the nine scenes the pulpit is generally considered to be a masterpiece, but more broadly it is considered a masterpiece of Italian gothic sculpture. This pulpit substituted the previous one made by Guglielmo (1157–1162) that was sent to the Cagliari Cathedral. Given the lack of documentation prior to its dismantling, the pulpit was placed in a location different from its original spot, and without doubt, its parts are not in their original positions either. It is unknown if the original work possessed a marble staircase.

==== Works of art ====
The cathedral houses numerous works of art alongside numerous sacred objects and artefacts. Among these are the relics of Saint Rainerius, patron saint of Pisa, and the fragmentary tomb of Henry VII, Holy Roman Emperor, who died at Buonconvento while holding Florence, in vain, under siege. The tomb, sculpted by Tino da Camaino between 1313 and 1315, was also dismantled then reconstructed and today sits in the right transept, while its original position was in the center of the apse as a sign of the city's Ghibbeline loyalty. Moved several times for political reasons, it eventually was separated into many parts (some inside the church, some on the façade, others in the Camposanto, and yet others in the cathedral museum). The cathedral also contains a bronze crucifix on the main altar, angel candelabras made by Giambologna placed on either end of the marble transenna, and a large silver ciborium designed by Giovanni Battista Foggini (1678–86) on the altar of the Blessed Sacrament chapel.

The 27 paintings that cover the galleries behind the main altar, depicting Stories of the Old Testament and Stories of the Life of Christ, were made between the 16th and 17th centuries mostly by Tuscan artists, among whom are Andrea del Sarto (three works: Saint Agnes, Saints Catherine and Margaret, and Saints Peter and John the Baptist), il Sodoma, and Domenico Beccafumi (Stories of Moses and the Evangelists).

On the numerous side altars are located 16th and 17th century paintings. Among these works are the Our Lady of Graces with Saints, by the Florentine Mannerist Andrea del Sarto, and the Madonna Enthroned with Saints in the right transept, by Perin del Vaga, a student of Raphael, both finished by Giovanni Antonio Sogliani. In the Baroque style are: the Disputation of the Holy Sacrament by the Sienese painter Francesco Vanni, and the Cross with Saints by Genoan Giovanni Battista Paggi. Particularly well-loved is the 13th century image of a Madonna and Child, called the Madonna Under the Organ, attributed to Berlinghiero Berlinghieri of Volterra.

The cathedral, like the leaning bell tower, is sinking perceptibly into the ground, and a few indications of this instability are visible. For example, the difference in the floor levels of the original nave of Buscheto and the bays which were added later by Rainaldo.

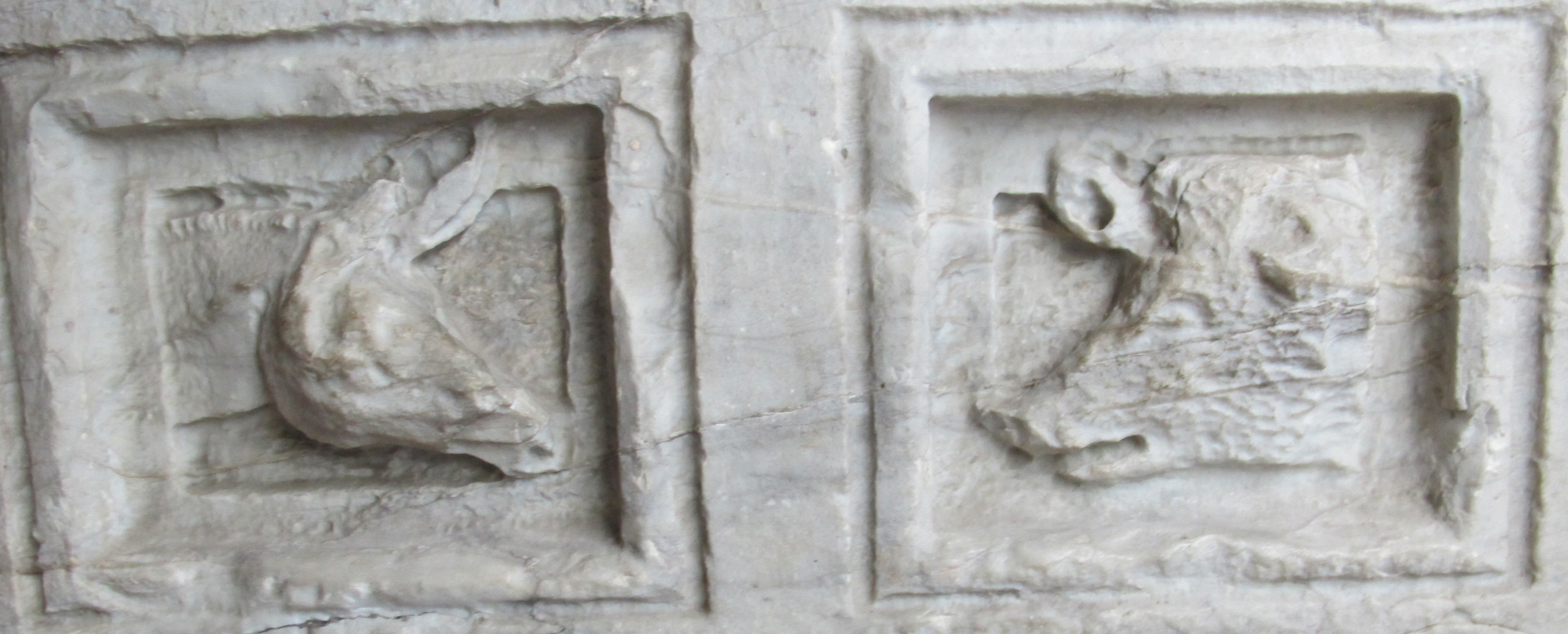
One of the original marble panels of the gràdule, now in the cathedral museum

The cathedral's original gràdule^{?}, constructed by Giovanni Pisano in the late 13th century, were replaced in 1865 by the present parvise. These marble panels, decorated with carved animal figures and faces, were used to create a low wall which was placed close to the outer perimeter of the cathedral and which created an enclosure that provided space for the numerous sarcophagi from the Roman period. During the Middle Ages, these panels were reused for burials of nobles (among them Beatrice of Lorraine) and other well known persons, such as the architect Buscheto, who is buried under the outer left arch of the west façade. Some fragments are still visible in the cathedral museum, while the sarcophagi were all moved inside the fence of the Camposanto.

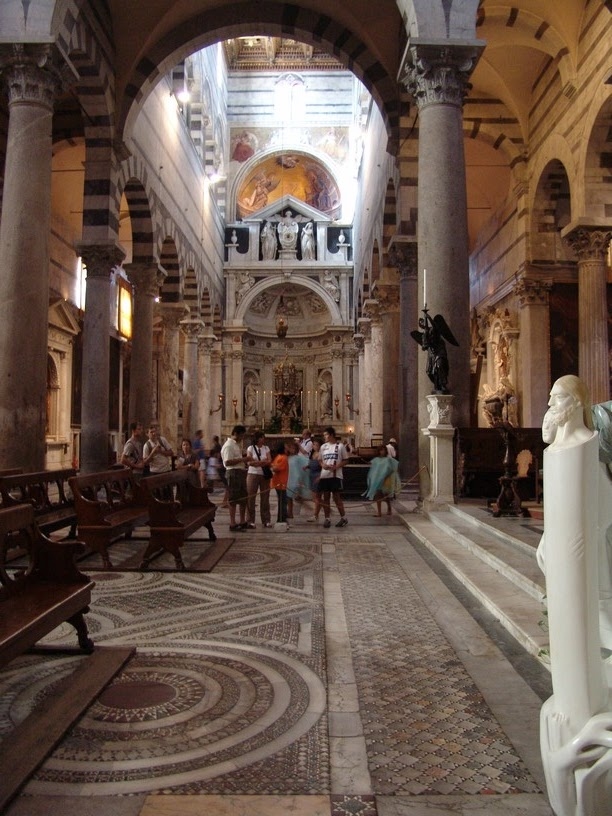
Blessed sacrament chapel

=== Organs ===
Inside the cathedral are found the Serassi organ made between 1831 and 1835, as well as an organ made in 1977 by the company Mascioni of Cuvio.

== Main artists who worked in the cathedral ==
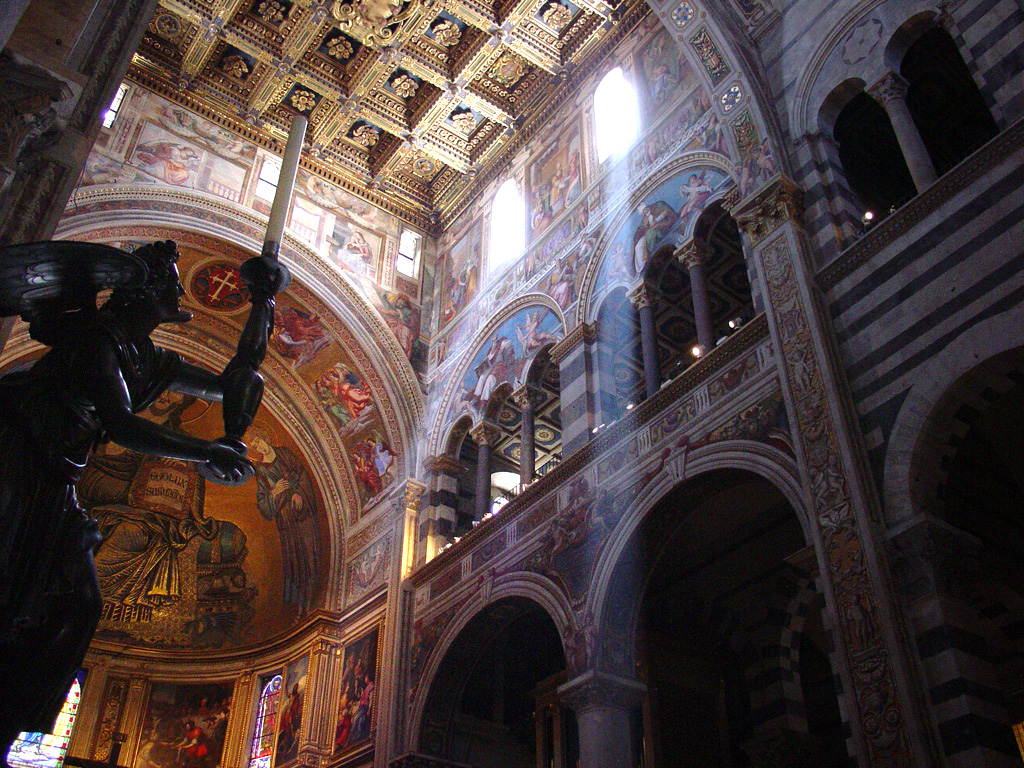
The coffered ceiling, 16th century fresco, angel candle holder, and Saint John by Cimabue (mosaic detail)

- Buscheto (architect)
- Rainaldo (elongation of nave, bays, and façade)
- Guglielmo (original pulpit and marble decoration)

The three artists listed above are buried in the cathedral.

- Cimabue (mosaic in the apse)
- Tino da Camaino (funeral monument of Henry VII)
- Bonanno Pisano (original bronze doors)
- Giambologna and his school (bronze doors of the façade)
- Giovanni Pisano (pulpit)
- Nicola Pisano e Giovanni Pisano (crown around the dome)^{Ref?}
- Pietro Tacca (crucifix and angel candle bearers)
- Andrea del Sarto (various paintings)
- Il Sodoma (various paintings)
- Giovanni Battista Tempesti (various paintings)
- Biduino (marble decoration)
- Giuliano Vangi (pulpit and main altar)
- Orazio Riminaldi and Girolamo Riminaldi (fresco in the dome)
- Vincenzo Possenti (chandelier)

== Of further interest ==
- At the end of the 10th century Pisa established March 25 as the beginning of its new year, an important date marking the Feast of the Annunciation (occurring nine months before Christ's birth on December 25). To mark the beginning of the Pisan new year a system was devised in the cathedral whereby a beam of light shines through a round window on the south side of the nave and, precisely at noon on March 25, lands on the same spot every year: on top of a shelf affixed to a pylon on the opposite side of the church. This shelf rests on a marble egg, a symbol of birth and new life. In 1750 the first day of the new year was officially changed to January 1, but this event is still celebrated every year accompanied by solemn religious and civic celebrations.
- The lamp at the center of the nave is called Galileo's lamp, because a legend says that the great scientist formulated his theory of isochronism of the pendulum while watching its oscillations from the roof of the nave. The original, however, smaller and very different than this one, is found today in the Camposanto.
- On the north side, to the left side of the façade in front of the Camposanto at about eye level, is an original piece of Roman marble (as testified by its decoration that can still in part be seen), on which are a series of small black marks. Legend says that these marks were left by the devil when he climbed up to the dome attempting to stop its construction, and so they are referred to as the scratches of the devil. (The legend also says that out of spite the number of scratches always changes when counted.)
- Legend has it that the amphora placed on a small column on the right side of the apse was used by Christ at the wedding feast of Cana when he turned water into wine.
- Pope Gregory VIII is buried in the cathedral.
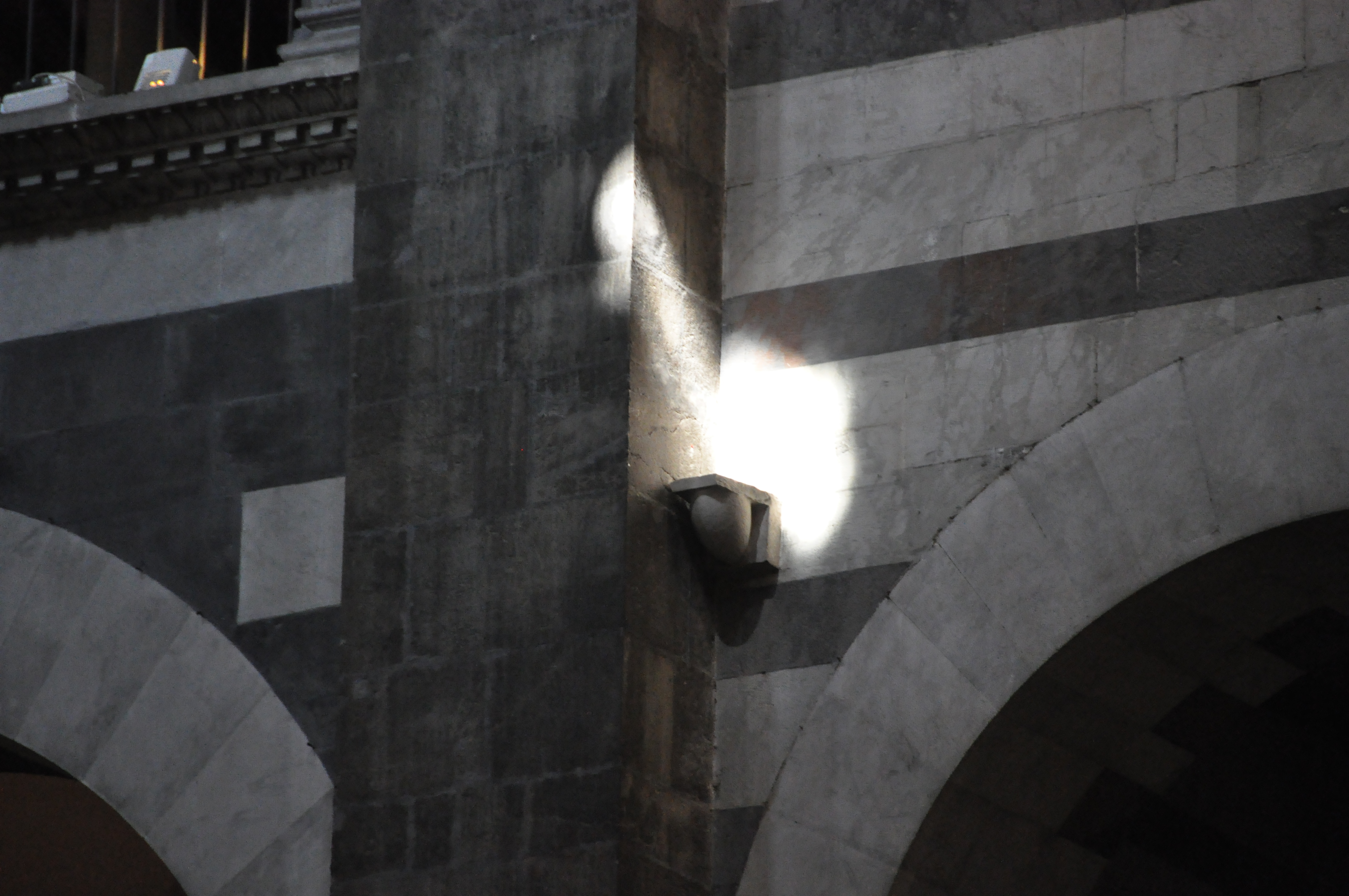
The ray of light on the Feast of the Annunciation

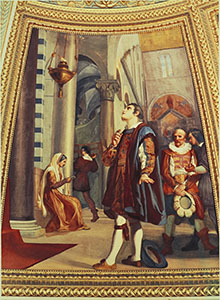
Galileo observing the lamp

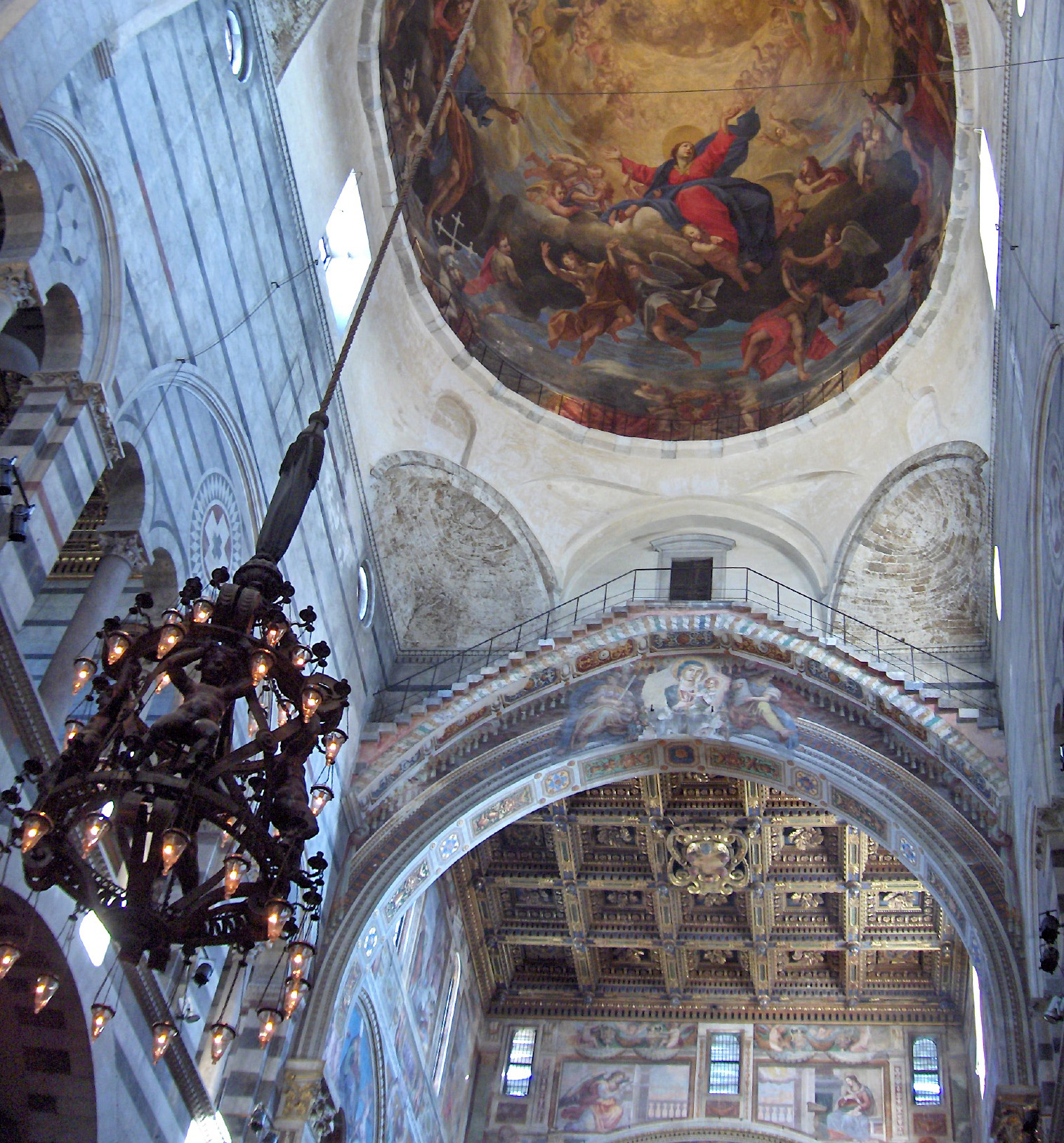
The so-called Lamp of Galileo and the cupola of the dome

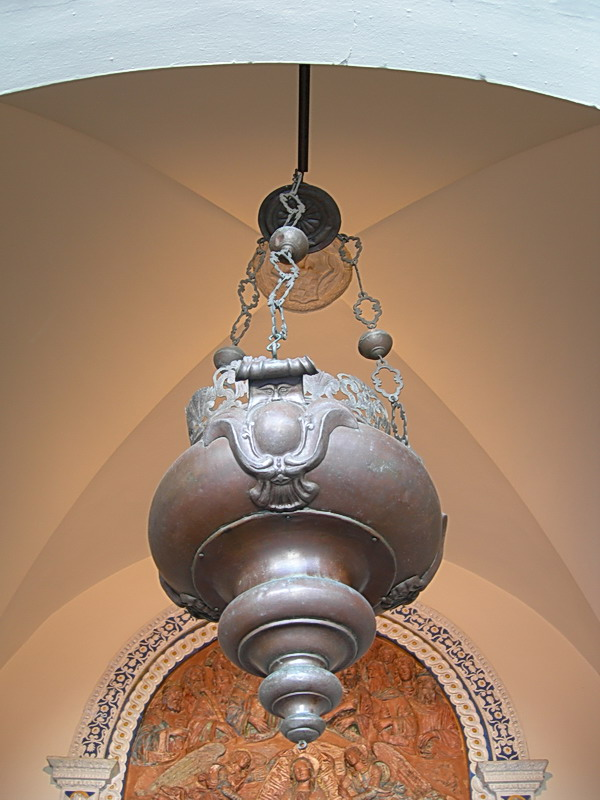
The original lamp seen by Galileo

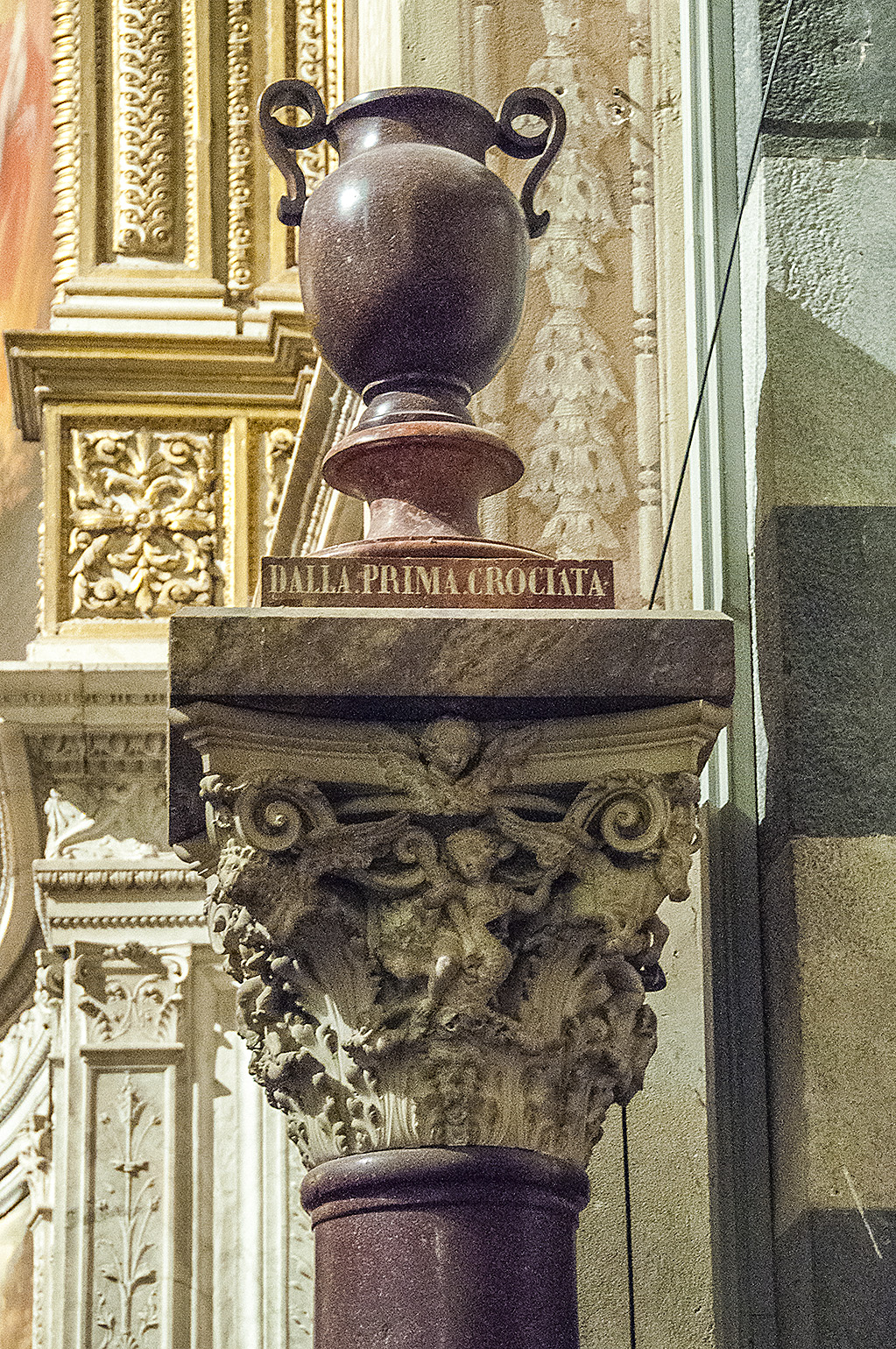
The amphora said to be from the wedding feast of Cana.

== Other images ==
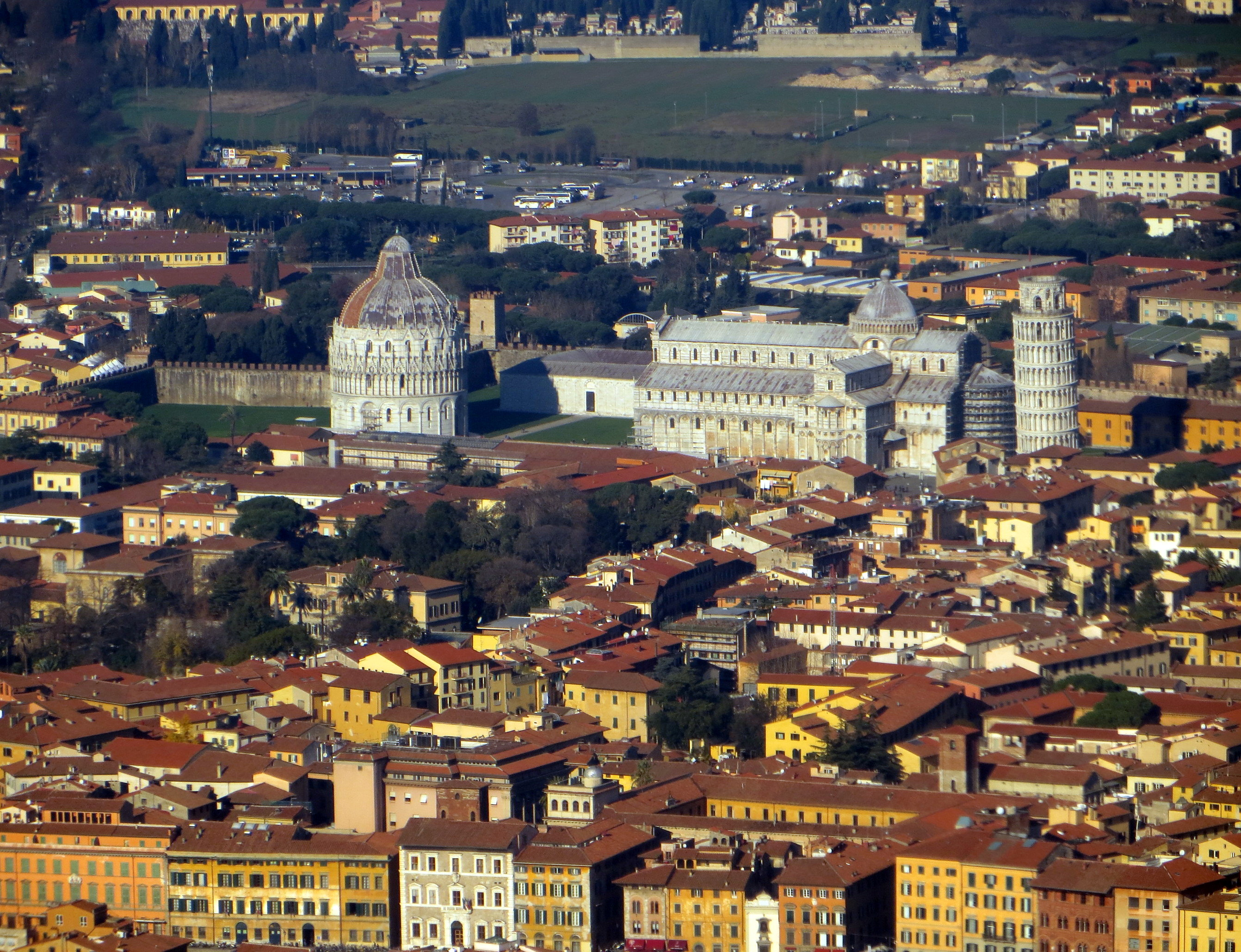
Aerial view with the complex of the Piazza dei Miracoli from the south

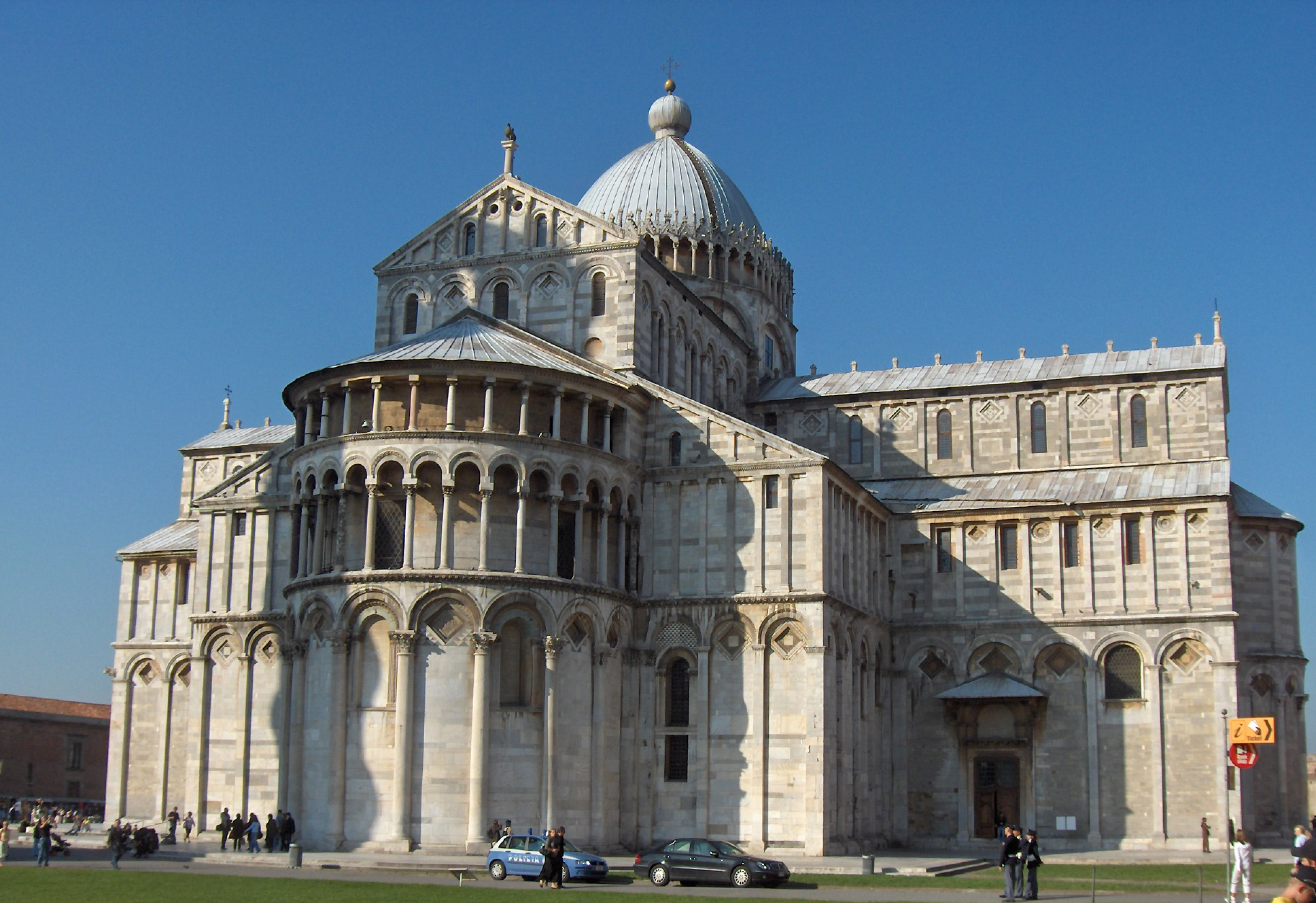
Eastern end of the cathedral

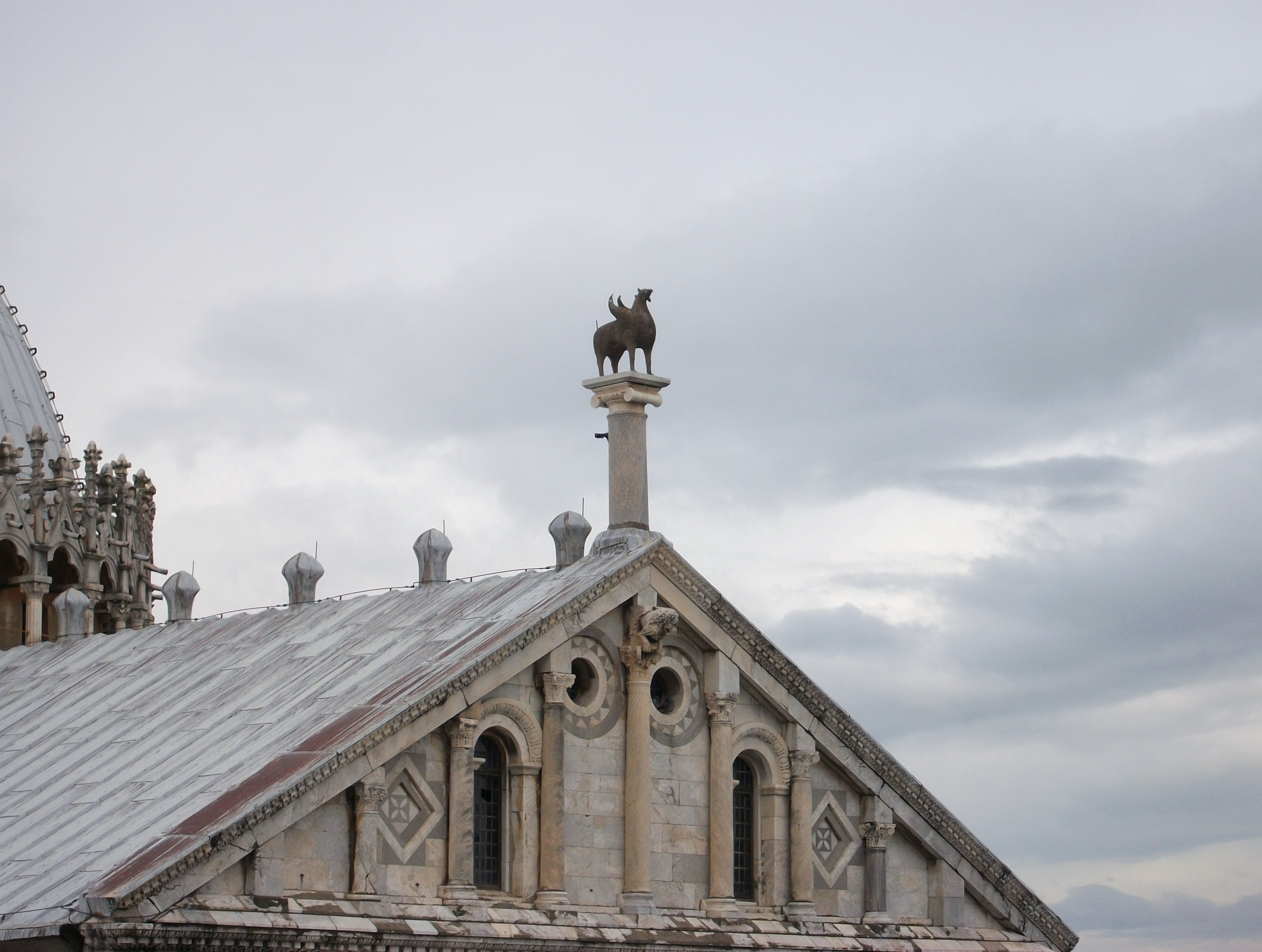
A copy of the bronze Pisa Griffin in its original position on the cathedral roof

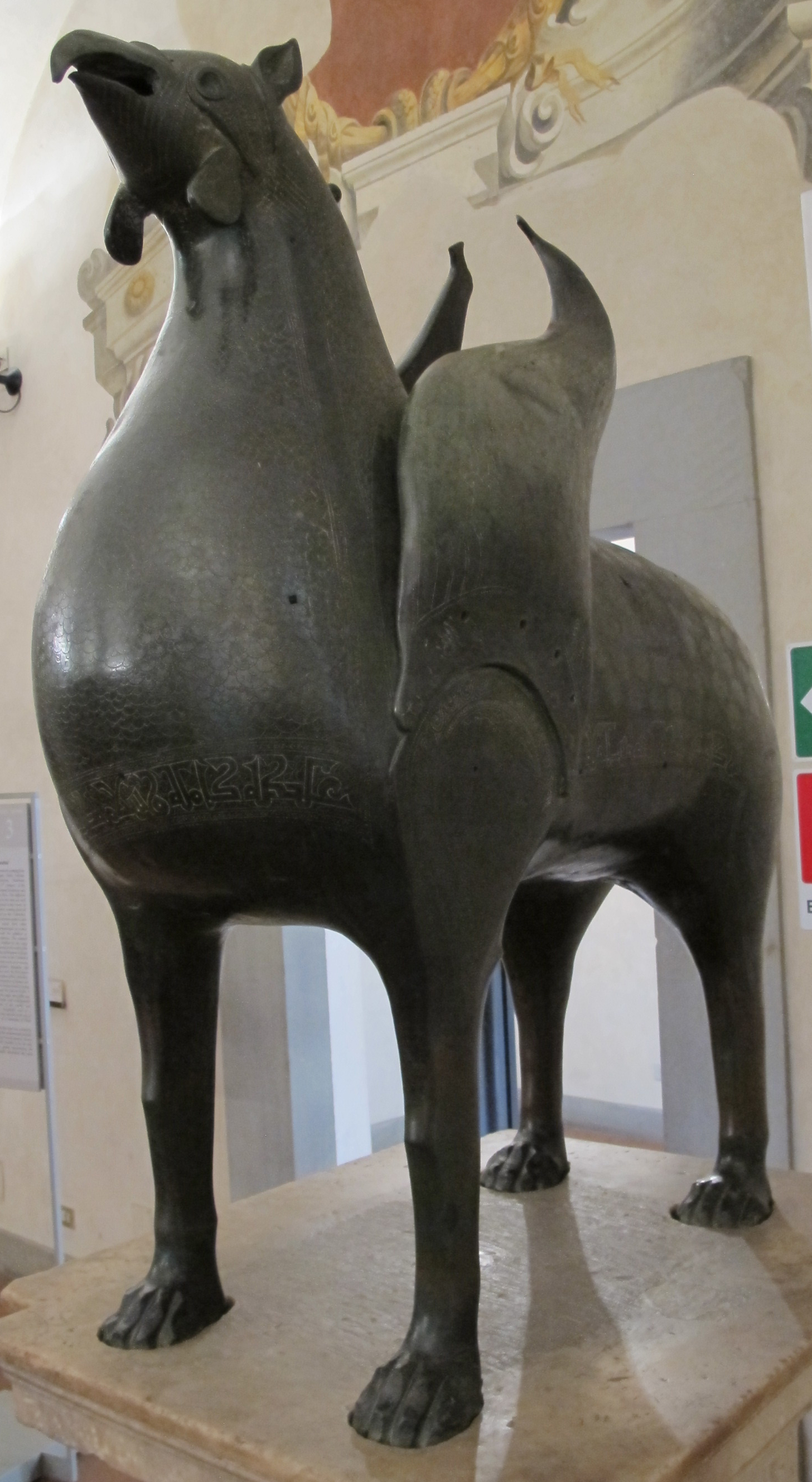
The bronze Pisa Griffin in the cathedral museum

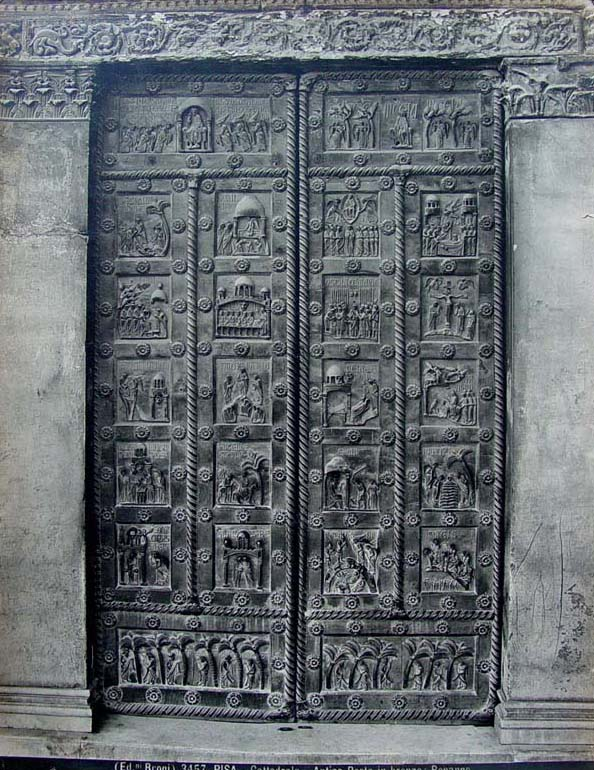
Door of Saint Rainier by Bonanno Pisano. 19th century photography by Giacomo Brogi

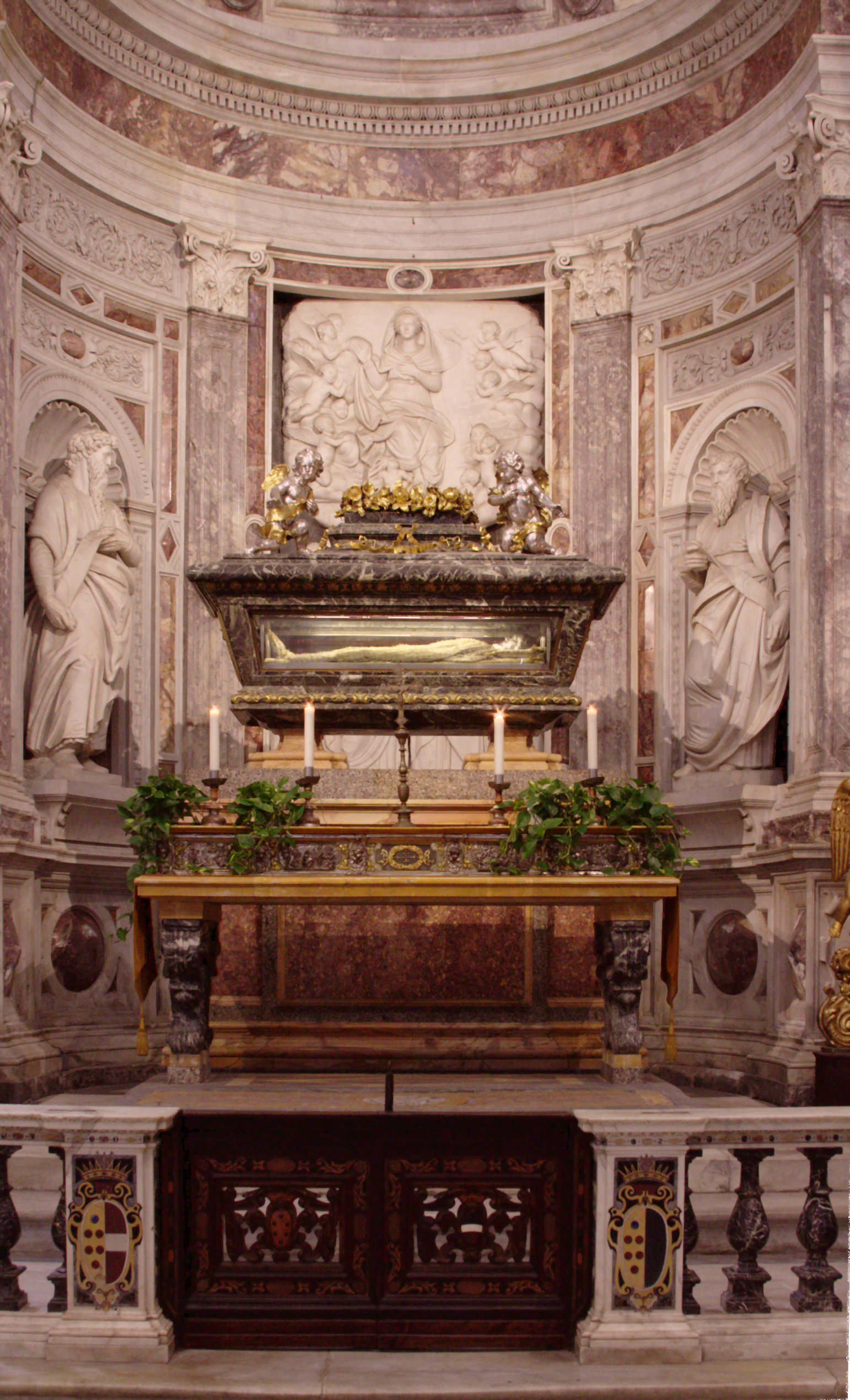
Tomb altar of Saint Rainier, patron saint of Pisa

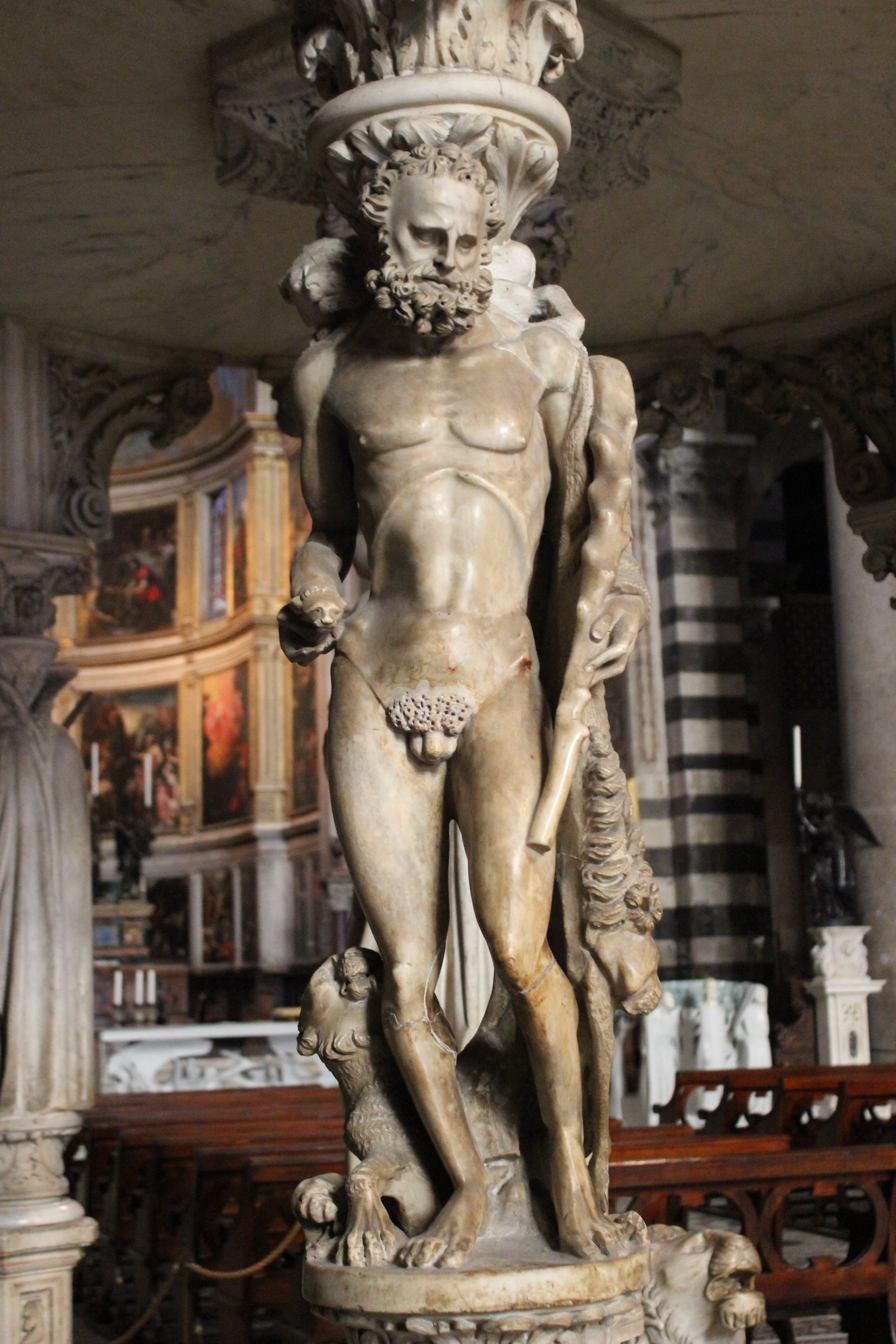
Detail of the pulpit, Hercules, a rare medieval depiction of a nude

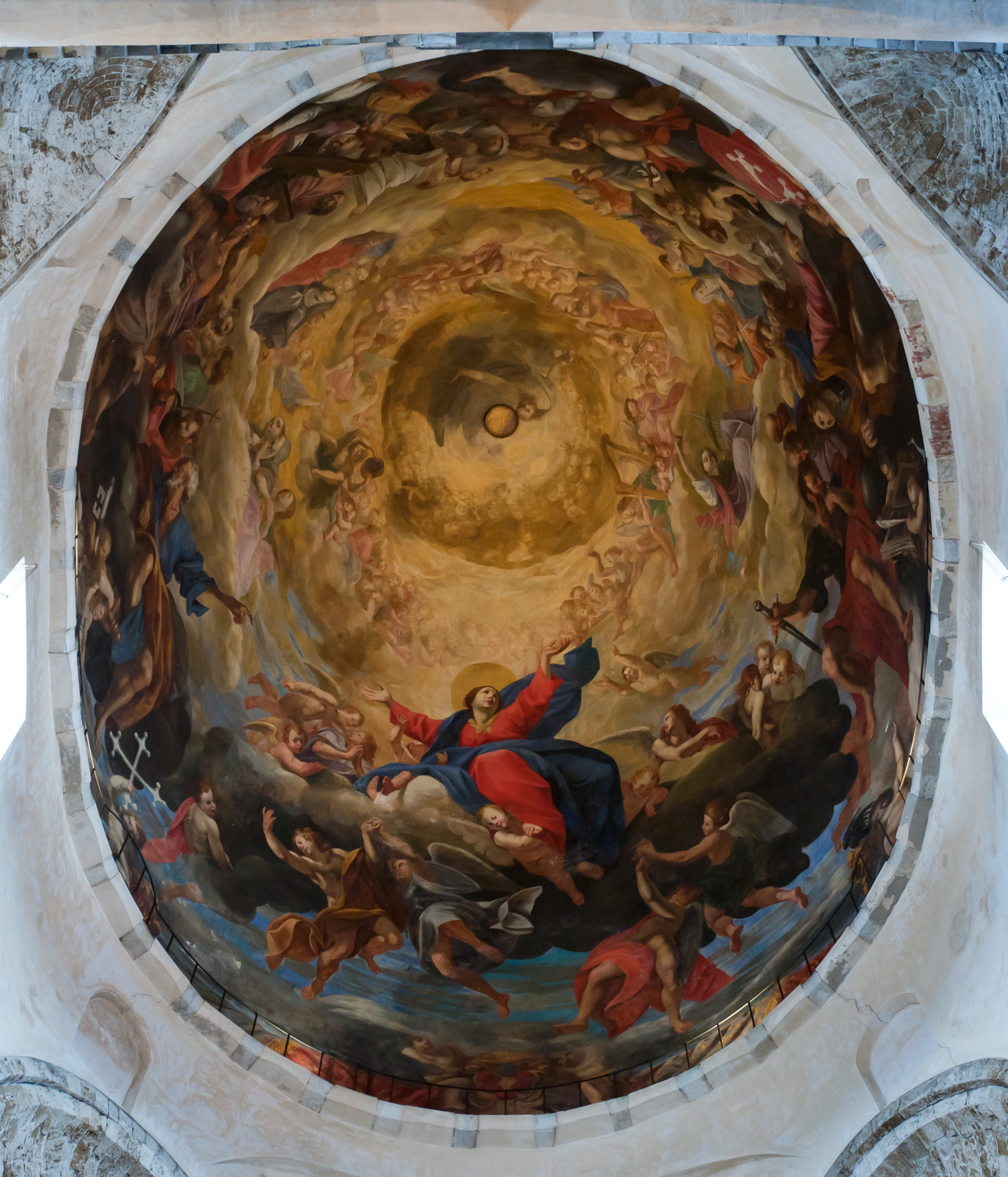
Encaustic painting of the Assumption in the dome

== See also ==
- Piazza dei Miracoli
- Archdiocese of Pisa
- Leaning Tower of Pisa
- Baptistery of Pisa
- High medieval domes
