= Della Gherardesca Tomb =

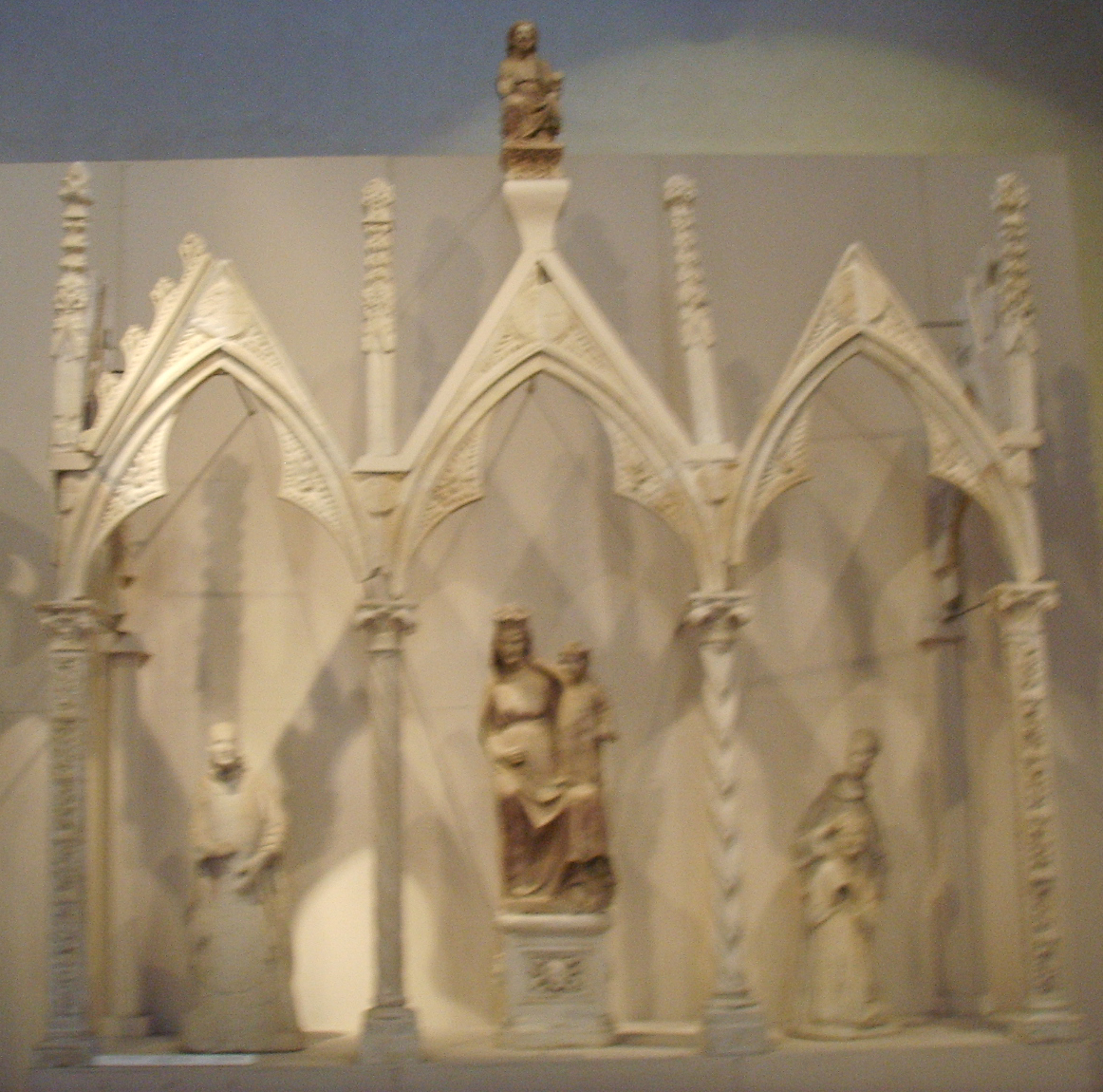
The arches

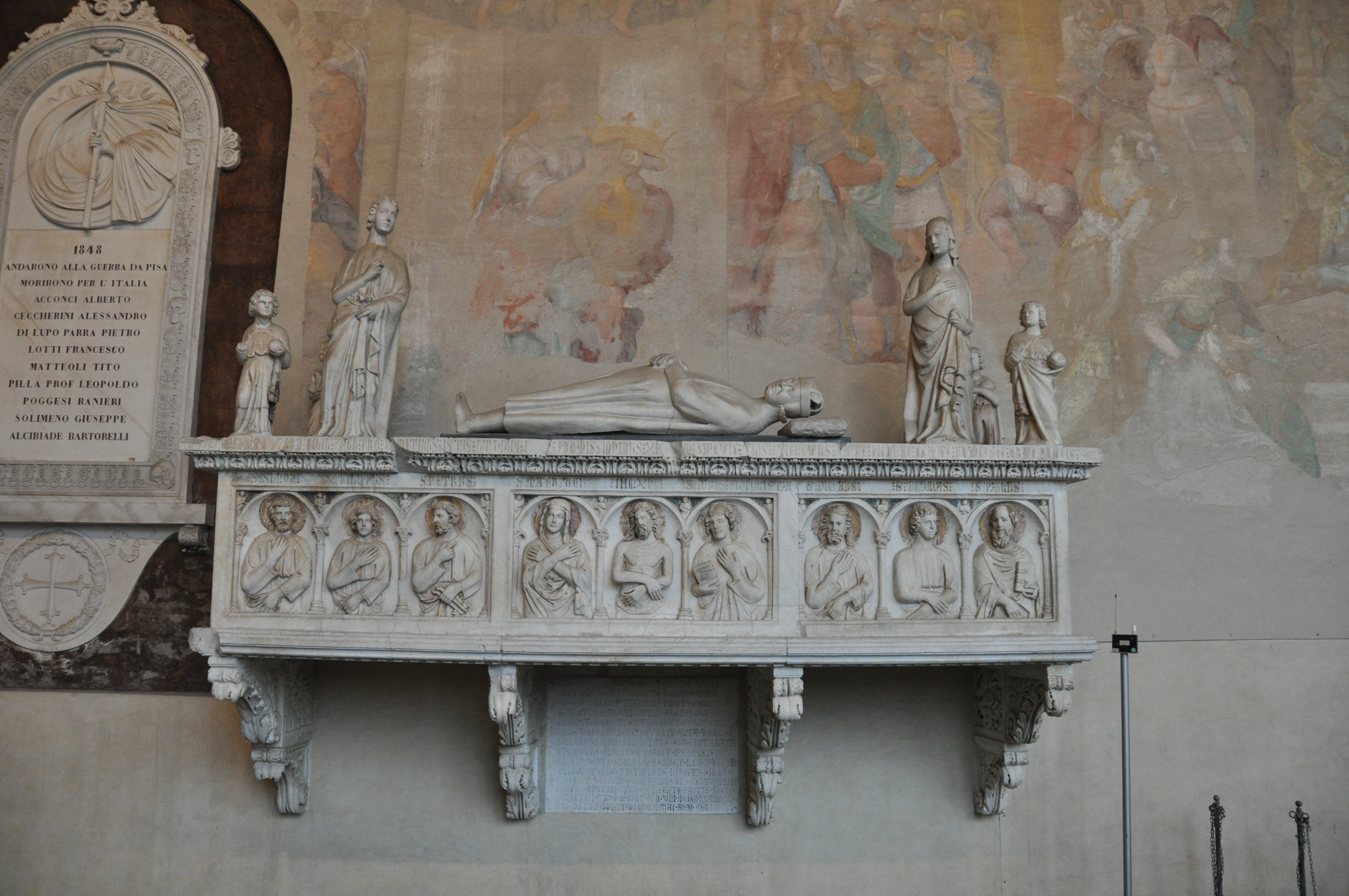
Sarcophagus

The Della Gherardesca Tomb is a set of early 14th century sculptures from the tomb of the Della Gherardesca family in Pisa, originally in the church of San Francesco, of which they were patrons. Its sculptor was Lupo di Francesco.

Originally multicoloured (traces of colour are still visible), the set includes a sarcophagus, statues and Gothic arches. The church was converted into a barracks during Florentine and French rule and the tomb was split up. The arches and some of the statues are now in the Museo nazionale di San Matteo, whilst the sarcophagus is now in the Camposanto Monumentale, where it was seriously damaged during a fire in 1944 - it was restored after the Second World War, although some parts were not replaced.
