= Rainaldo =

Italian architect

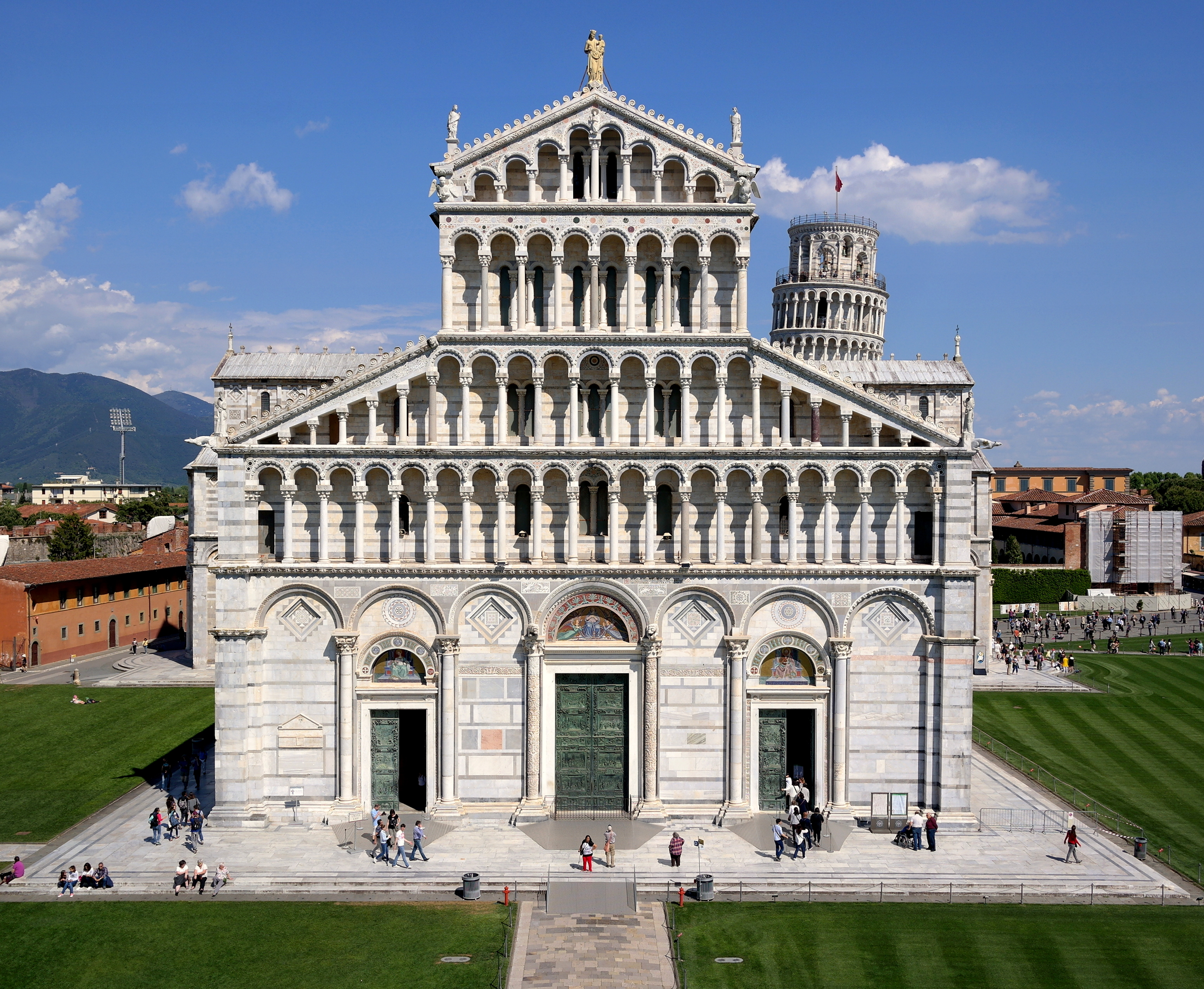
- Pisa Cathedral
- Occupation: Architect
- Years active: 12th century
- Buildings: Pisa Cathedral

Rainaldo was a 12th-century architect in Pisa. He is assumed to be the one who completed the work on the Pisa Cathedral started by Buscheto. The attribution is based on his own declaration left on the façade of the cathedral that defined the Pisan Romanesque style. Rainaldo, together with Buscheto, is therefore considered a creator of this influential style.

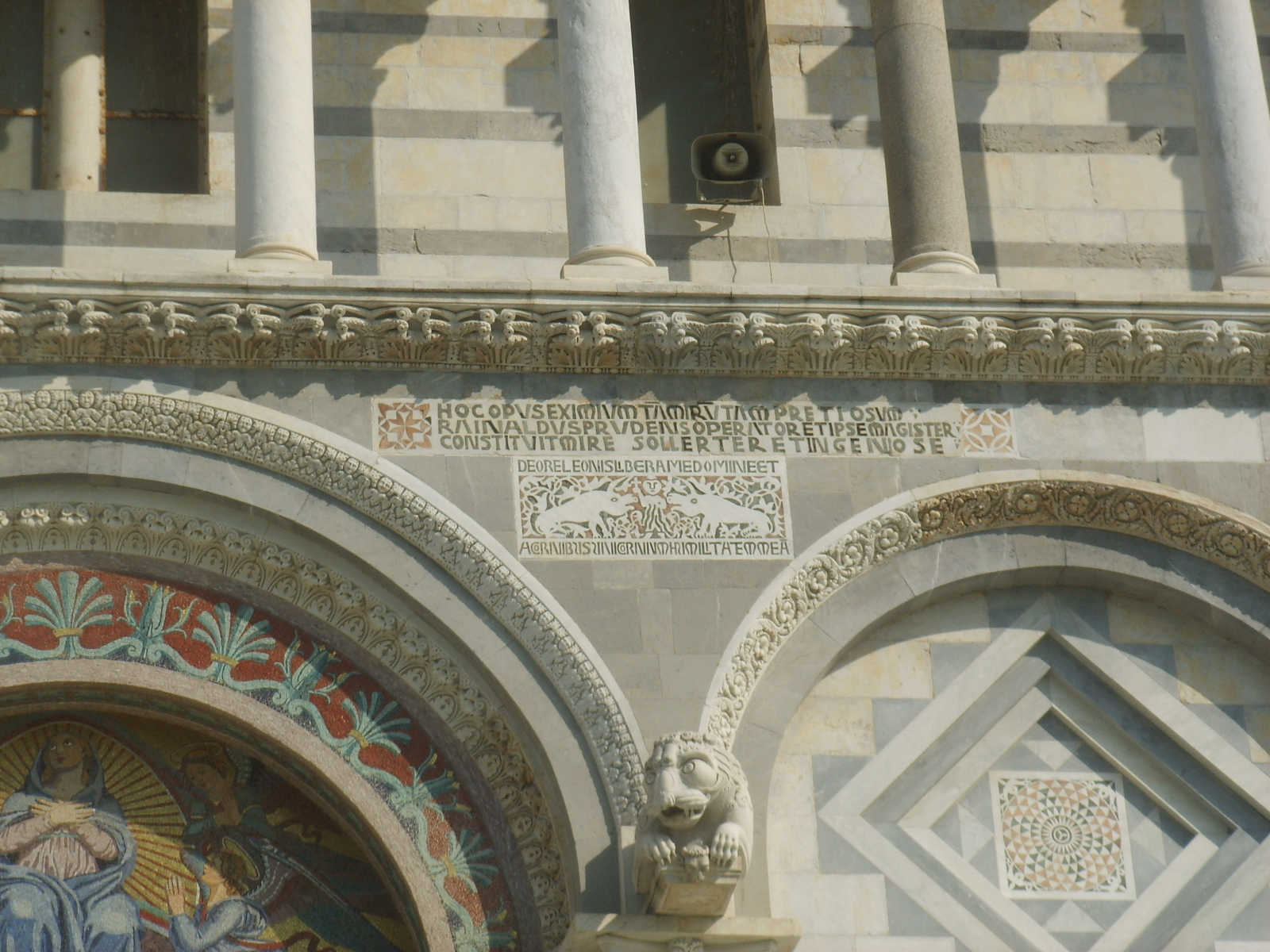
Inscription that mentions Rainaldo

No details of Rainaldo's biography are known. Extent and timing of his contributions are also uncertain. Usually Rainaldo is thought to be an architect overseeing (in the 12th century) an extension of the nave by adding three bays consistent with the original style of Buscheto, enlarging the transept, and planning a new facade which was completed by workers under the direction of the sculptors Guglielmo and Biduino. The exact date of the work is unclear: according to some, the work was done right after the death of Buscheto about the year 1110, though others say it was done closer to 1140, yet other researchers suggest the end of the century. In any case, work was finished in 1180, as documented by the date written on the bronze knockers made by Bonanno Pisano found on the main door. Fedotova credits Raynaldo with a dominating architectural composition of the new facade, with four levels of arches and pillars, dating this change 1150–1160.

== Sources ==
- Barsali, Isa Belli (1972). "Buscheto (Busketus, Buschetto, Boschetto)". Dizionario Biografico degli Italiani (in Italian). Vol. 15: Buffoli–Caccianemici. Rome: Istituto dell'Enciclopedia Italiana. ISBN 978-88-12-00032-6.
- Федотова, Елена (2006). Италия. История искусства (in Russian). Белый город. ISBN 978-5-04-009533-9.
- Cardini, Franco (2022-04-25). "Epilogue: The Iconic Status of Medieval Pisa and Its Urban Form". A Companion to Medieval Pisa. BRILL. pp. 497–518. doi:10.1163/9789004512719_023. ISBN 978-90-04-51271-9.
- Valli, F.M. (2016). Pisa: lo spazio e il sacro (in Italian). Edizioni Polistampa. ISBN 978-88-596-1666-5.
