= Christ Enthroned with the Virgin and Saint John =

Mosaic in the apse of Pisa Cathedral

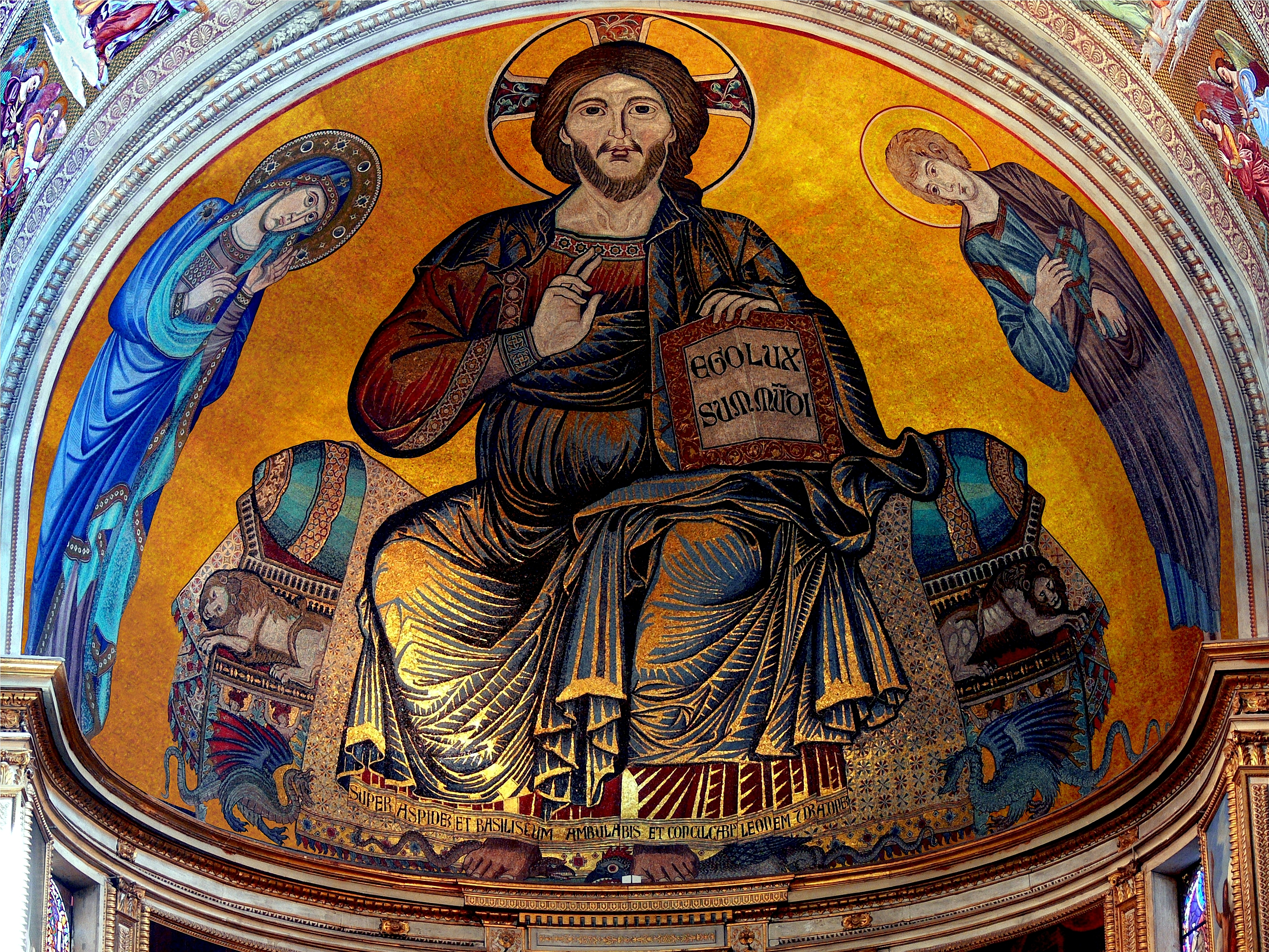
- Artist: Francesco da Pisa, Cimabue and Vincino da Pistoia
- Year: 1301–1320
- Medium: Mosaic
- Dimensions: 385 cm × 223 cm (152 in × 88 in)
- Location: Pisa Cathedral; Pisa

Christ Enthroned with the Virgin and Saint John (Italian: Cristo in trono tra la Vergine e san Giovanni) is a mosaic in the apse of Pisa Cathedral. It is famous for the depiction of John the Evangelist, the last work by the Italian medieval artist Cimabue. It is also the only work of his which is dated and has historical documentation attributing it to Cimabue.

Cimabue took over the work on the mosaic after Francesco da Pisa, who completed the figure of Christ. Cimabue worked on the mosaic for 94 days until 19 February 1302 and was specifically stated to have finished the figure of Saint John by that date. The whole mosaic, including the figure of the Virgin, was only completed by a third artist, Vincino da Pistoia, in 1321, almost 20 years after Cimabue's death.

The attribution to Cimabue is possible due to documented weekly payments of 10 soldi to the artist. The work eventually went through four renovations and survived the fire of 1595.

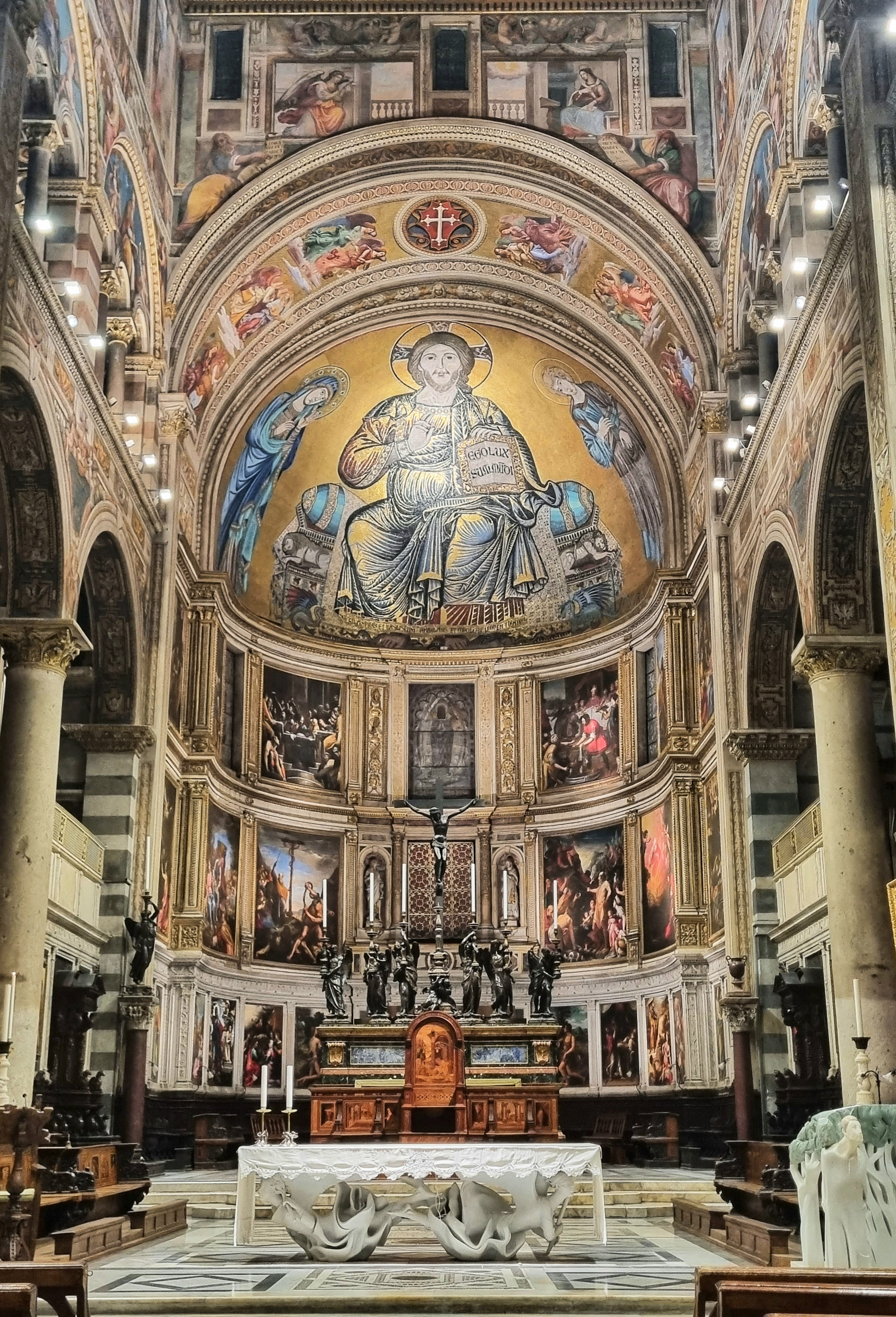
The mosaic in its architectural context

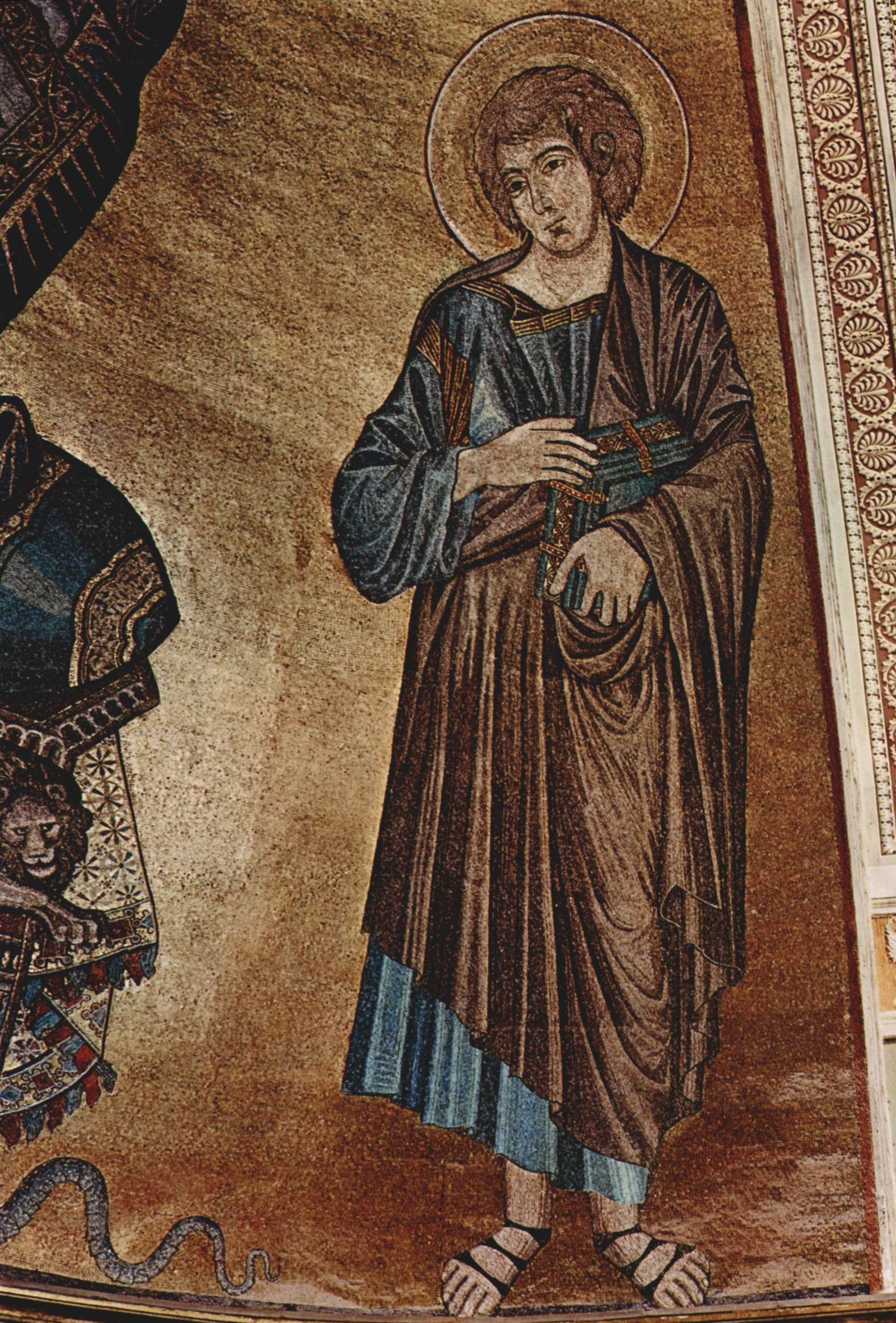
The figure of Saint John, the only documented work by Cimabue
