= Buscheto =

Italian architect

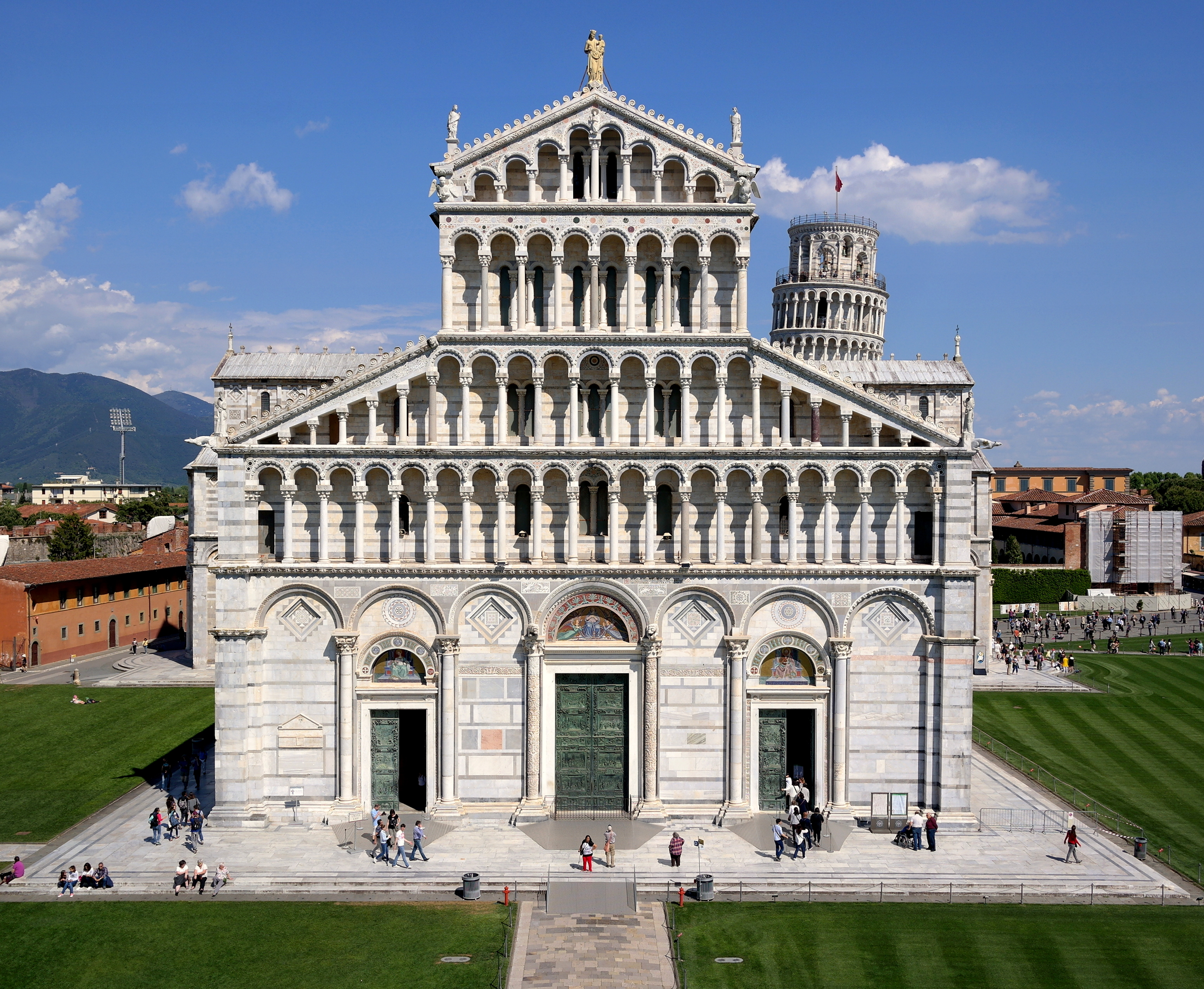
- Pisa Cathedral
- Died: September 21
- Resting place: Pisa Cathedral
- Other names: Busketus, Buschetto, Boschetto, Bruschettus
- Occupation: Architect
- Years active: 1063-1110
- Buildings: Pisa Cathedral

Buscheto or Busketus (sometimes also Buschetto or Boschetto, early Latin writers also used Bruschettus, active in Pisa between 1063 and 1110) was an Italian architect. He designed the plans for Pisa's Cathedral Square (Piazza dei Miracoli) and thus created the distinct Pisan Romanesque design style used throughout the square. Buscheto had unitary vision fusing together architectural ideas of classical Rome, Byzantine, Arab, and Lombard Romanesque architectures, placing him amongst the best architects of the 11th and 12th centuries.

Very little is known about Buscheto; claims that he was a Greek from Dulichium are based on a misreading of the epitaph. Leopoldo Cicognara had assumed Buscheto's Italian origin based on his name, yet Leader Scott points out that this can be a nickname. Approaches utilized by the architect cannot be explained by local traditions (Pisa likely did not even have its own school of architecture before Buscheto). Buscheto's style suggests first-hand familiarity with Early Christian, Byzantine, and Islamic architecture.

Just two contemporary documents definitely identify Buscheto: they name him as one of the administrators (Operai) of the Pisa cathedral; one is dated December 2nd, 1104, another - April 2nd, 1110. Researchers think that he designed the cathedral and started its construction in 1063 while still being a young man, and continued work on the project into the 1100s.

== Epitaphs ==
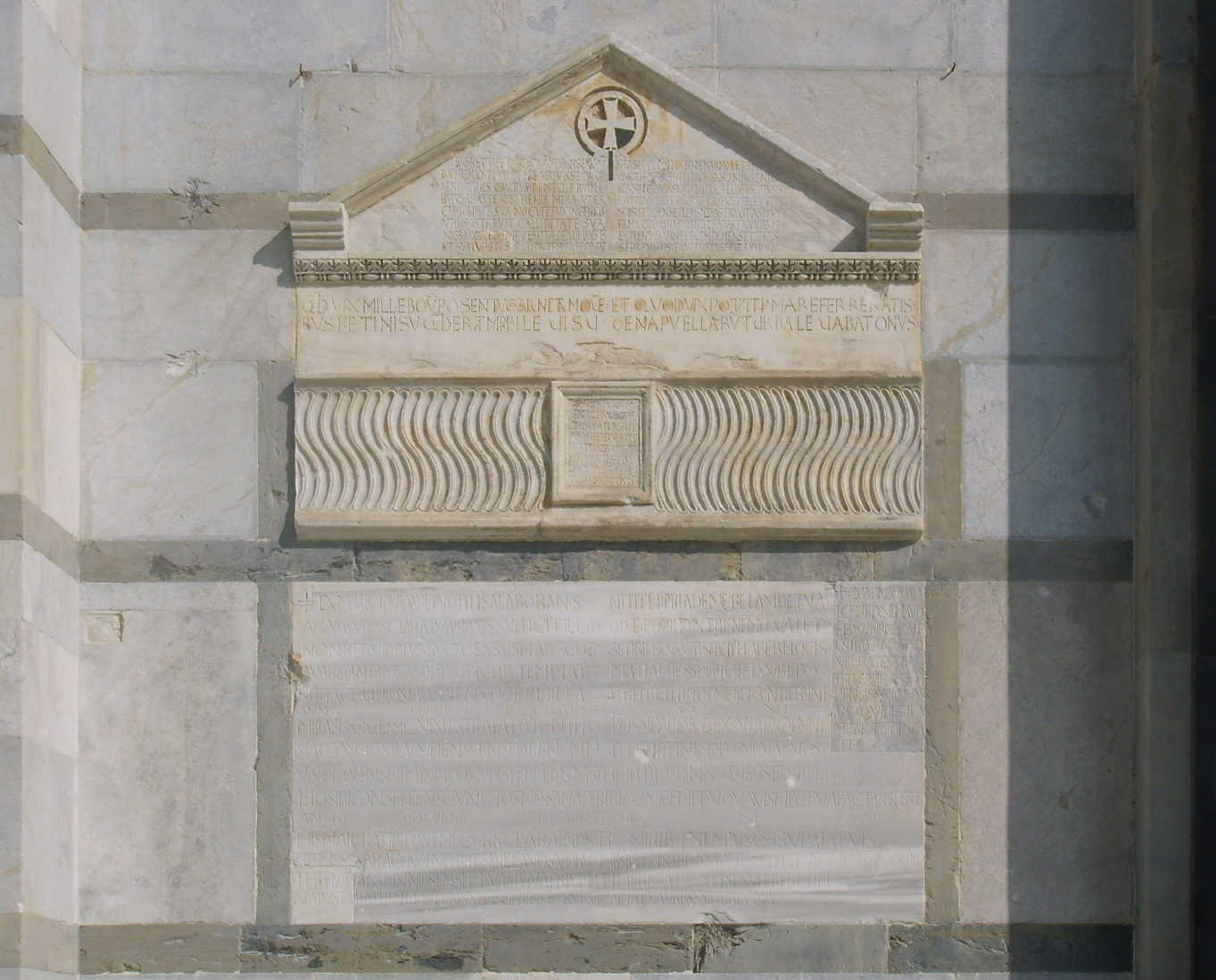
Epitaph at the Pisa Cathedral

An original epitaph on the cathedral reads, "Non habet exemplum niveo de marmore templum. / Quod fit Busketi prorsus ab ingenio" ("there is nothing like a white marble temple / built solely by Buscheto's genius"). During the expansion of the cathedral by architect Rainaldo the tomb was transferred to the new facade (first blind arch on the left, the original epitaph is above the strigilated sarcophagus with remains) and a new inscription added below, "Quod vix mille boum possent iuga iuncta movere / Et quod vix potuit per mare ferre ratis / Busketi nisu quod erat mirabile visu / Dena puellarum turba levabat onus" ("a thousand oxen could barely move it / and a ship hardly could carry it across the sea / wonderful to see with Buscheto's skill / a group of girls lifting the weight"). The newer epitaph shows admiration of Buscheto'e engineering skills and refers to the size and weight of monolithic columns of the cathedral. Epitaph goes on favorably comparing Buscheto to Daedalus, a great architect, and Ulysses, a symbol of ingenuity.

A similar epigraph in Rome, now lost, was celebrating some "Buzeta" in very similar words: "Ingenio Buzeta tuo bis quinque puellae / appositis manibus hanc erexere columnam" ("Buzeta's wit, twice the five maidens / erect this pillar by hands"), this suggests identification of Buzeta as Buscheto and might explain his exposure to the Roman architecture.

Reference to "white marble", the material mostly used during the expansion of the cathedral, suggests that at least some of the work on this expansion was executed by Buscheto himself prior to the completion of the Duomo by Rainaldo.

== Other identifications ==
A name of Buscheto also appears in the documents of the cathedral of Pistoia. It is not clear that the two records, dated 1076 and 1078 are referring to the same architect. Other attempts at identification are even more tentative and are based on documents presumed to exist, but no longer traceable.

Newly rediscovered documents of Archivio Capitolare di Pisa, written between 1104 and 1110, contain references to some Buschettus. Two of the documents, dated 13 February and 23 July 1104, describe him as filius quondam Iohannis (son of Johannes). While at the time a certain Judge Johannes belonged to the Pisan elite, the documents do not mention any details about Buschettus's father.

== Sources ==
- Scott, Leader (1899). The Cathedral Builders: The Story of a Great Masonic Guild. New York: Charles Scribner's Sons.
- Barsali, Isa Belli (1972). "Buscheto (Busketus, Buschetto, Boschetto)". Dizionario Biografico degli Italiani (in Italian). Vol. 15: Buffoli–Caccianemici. Rome: Istituto dell'Enciclopedia Italiana. ISBN 978-88-12-00032-6.
- Duda, Michalina; Jóźwiak, Sławomir; Wiewióra, Marcin (2020-01-01). "Byzantine Architects, Builders, and Stonemasons in Latin Europe in the 10th to 12th Centuries". Mediaevistik. 33 (1): 113–130. doi:10.3726/med.2020.01.05. ISSN 0934-7453.
- Buscheto entry (in Italian) in the Enciclopedia Treccani
- Ascani, V. (1993). "Buscheto (o Buschetto)". Enciclopedia dell' Arte Medievale. Treccani. pp. 17–20.
- Grove (2012). "Buschetto". The Grove Encyclopedia of Medieval Art and Architecture. Oxford University Press. pp. 472–473. ISBN 978-0-19-539536-5.
