= Girolamo Riminaldi =

Italian painter

Girolamo Riminaldi was an Italian painter of the Baroque period. He was the brother of Orazio and practised in Pisa in the early part of the 17th century. He survived his brother, who died in 1631, and completed his Orazio's last work.
