= Lupo di Francesco =

Italian sculptor and architect

Lupo di Francesco (14th century) was an Italian sculptor and architect, active in Pisa.

He collaborated with Giovanni Pisani in the sculpting of the pulpit of the Cathedral of Pisa, later was a pupil of Tino di Camaino. In 1315, he worked as architect of the Cathedral of Pisa. He was active in 1325.

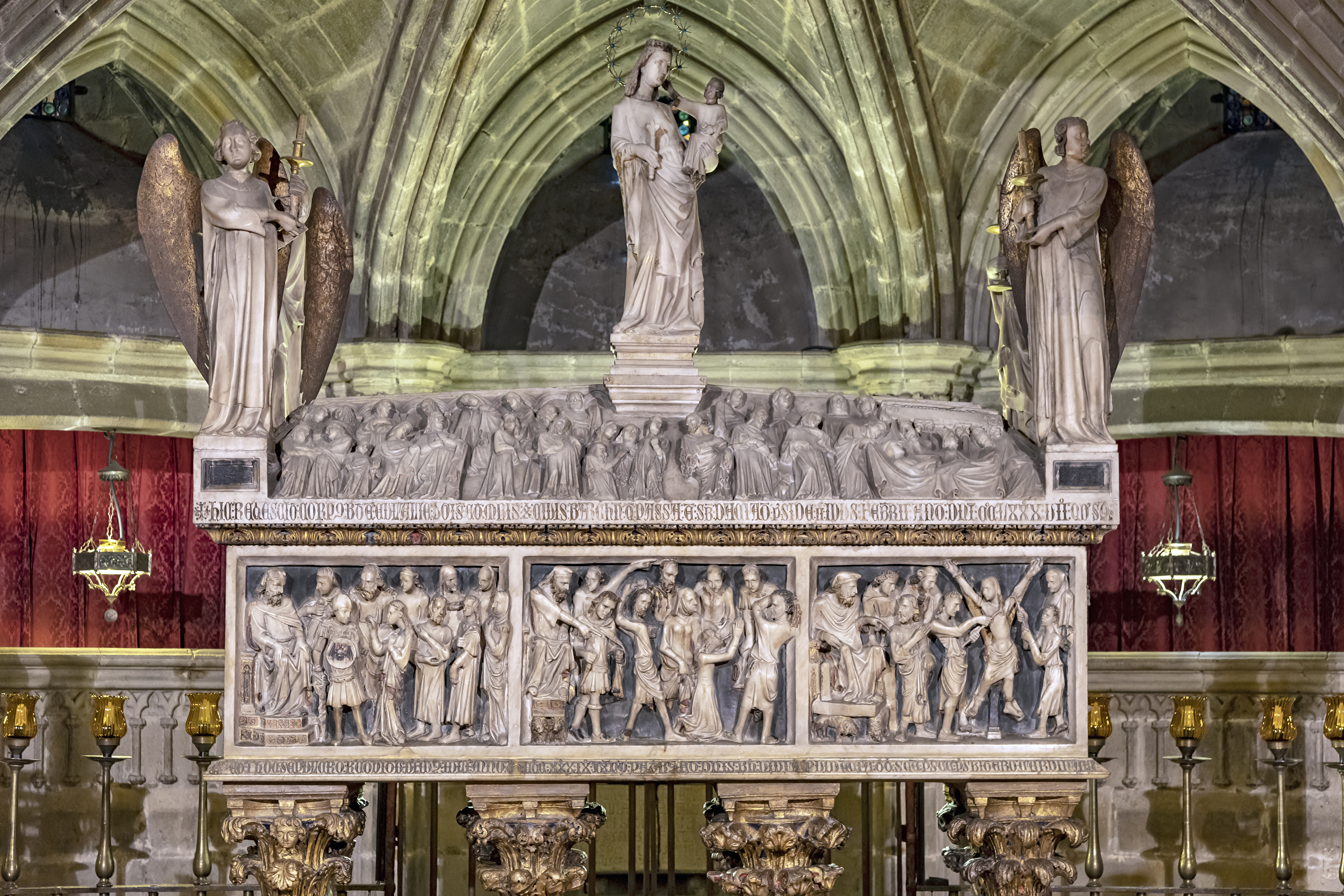
tomb of Eulalie of Barcelona by Lupo di Francesco
