= Nursing Madonna (Andrea Pisano) =

Sculpture by Andrea Pisano

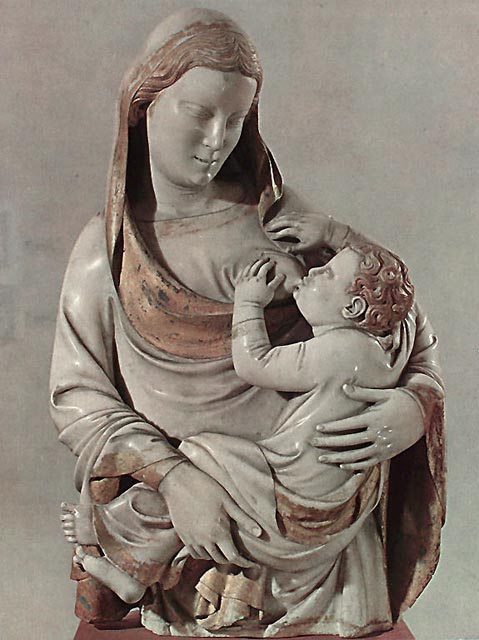
- Artist: Andrea Pisano
- Medium: Marble sculpture
- Subject: Madonna and Child
- Location: Museo Nazionale di San Matteo, Pisa

Nursing Madonna (Italian - Madonna del Latte) is a 14th-century marble sculpture of the Madonna and Child attributed to Andrea Pisano, his son Nino Pisano, or a collaboration between the two. It was originally produced for a niche at the church of Santa Maria della Spina. Today it is in the Museo Nazionale di San Matteo in Pisa, Italy.
