= Giovanni d'Apparecchiato =

Italian painter

Giovanni di Apparecchiato, also called il Nuccaro (circa 1300) was an Italian painter of the Gothic period in Pisa.

== Biography ==
He was born in Lucca. He helped Cimabue paint an altarpiece for the altar of Santo Spirito in the church of Santa Chiara in Pisa. He also painted in 1299 a fresco in the Deputation room of the Palazzo dell'Opera facing the Piazza dei Miracoli in Pisa.
