= Andrea Pisano =

Italian sculptor and architect (1290–1348)

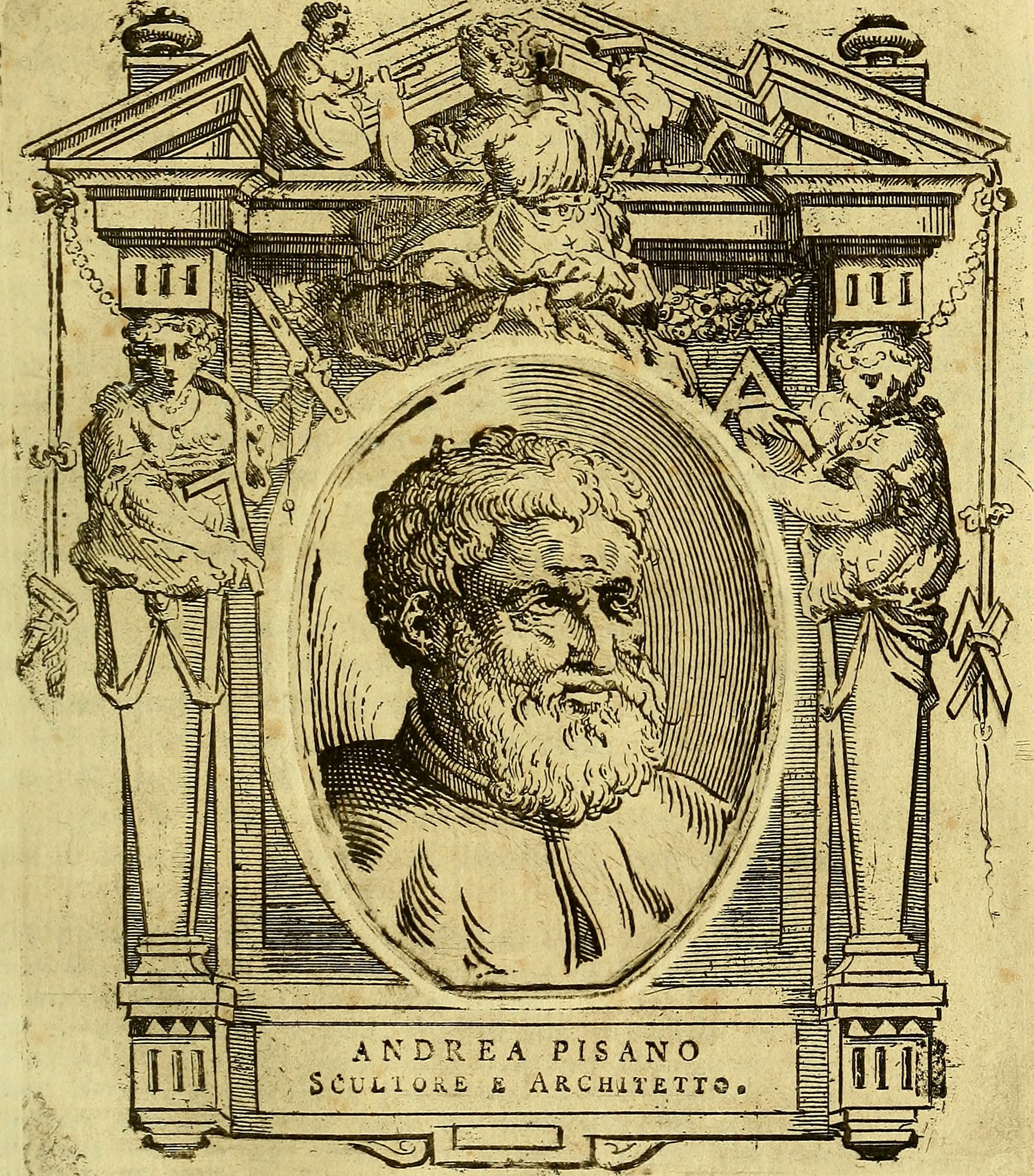
- Born: 1290; Pontedera, Republic of Pisa
- Died: 1348 (aged 57–58); Orvieto, Papal States
- Known for: Architecture, sculpture

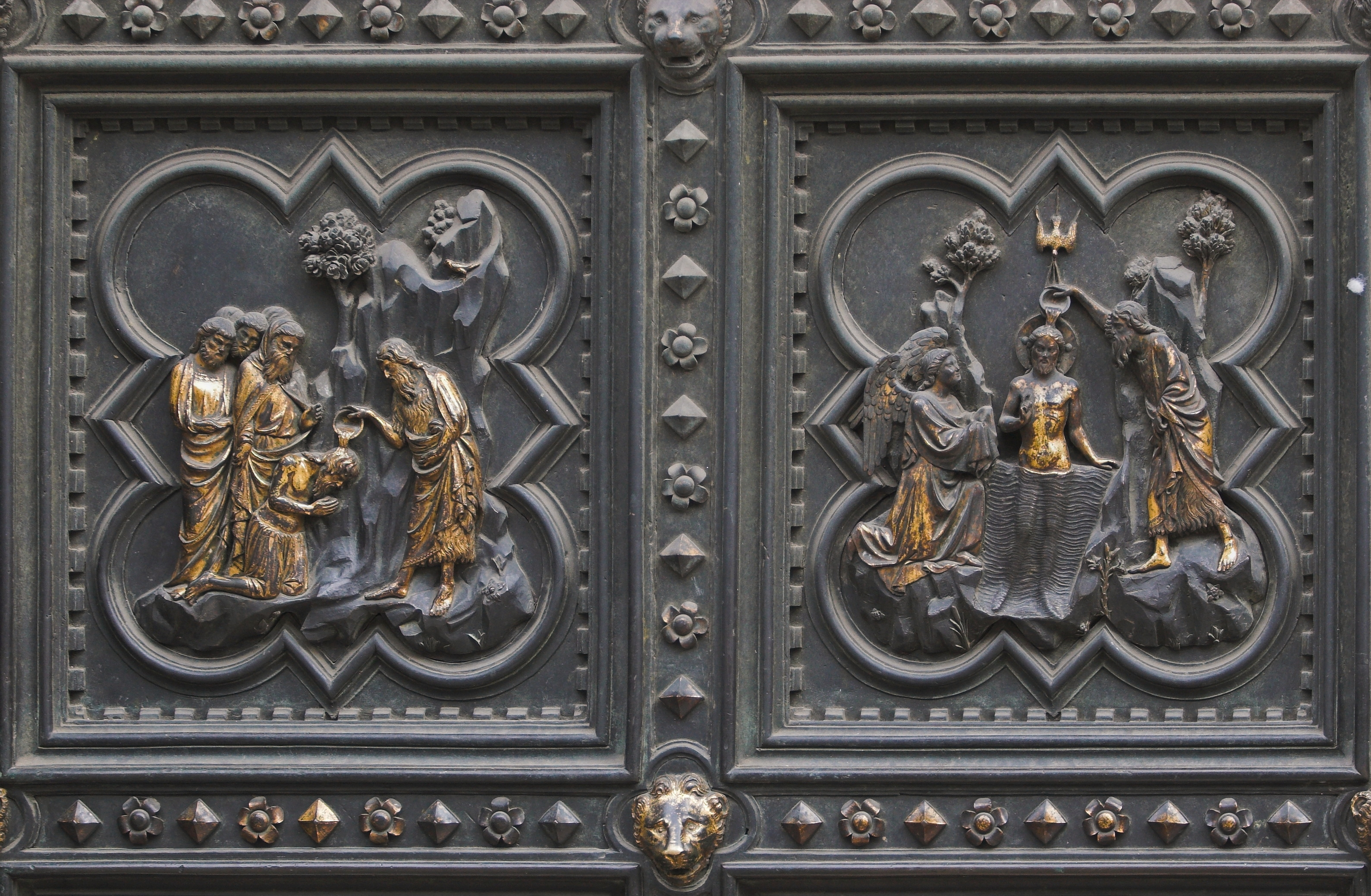
Two panels from the south door of Florence Baptistery, 1330–36

Andrea Pisano (Pontedera 1290 – 1348 Orvieto) also known as Andrea da Pontedera, was an Italian sculptor and architect.

== Biography ==
Pisano initially learned the trade of a goldsmith. He later became an apprentice of Mino di Giovanni, about 1300, and worked with him on the sculpture for Santa Maria della Spina at Pisa and elsewhere. He produced his main works in Florence. It is assumed that Giotto was eventually more influential on his style than his earlier teacher.

He produced the first (now on the south side) of the three bronze doors of the Baptistery in Florence, preceding those of Lorenzo Ghiberti. He worked on this major project between 1330–1336. The door consists of a number of small quatrefoil panels, the lower eight containing single figures of the Virtues, and the rest scenes from the life of John the Baptist.

Pisano, while living in Florence, also produced many important works of marble sculpture, all of which show Giotto's influence. In 1340 he succeeded Giotto as Master of the Works of Florence's Cathedral. There he produced a series of reliefs, possibly designed by his former teacher, including the double band of panel-reliefs which Pisano executed for the great campanile. The subjects of these are the Four Great Prophets, the Seven Virtues, the Seven Sacraments, the Seven Works of Mercy and the Seven Planets. The duomo contains the most important works of Pisano in marble (now in its museum).

In 1347 he became Master of the Works at Orvieto Cathedral, which had already been designed and begun by Lorenzo Maitani. These and the cathedral's doors are Pisano's only surviving works. Pisano is known for contributing to freeing modern art from Byzantine influence. He died in 1348.

He had two sons, Nino and Tommaso. Both eventually succeeded him as Master of the Works at Orvieto Cathedral.

Giorgio Vasari includes a biography of Andrea Pisano in his Lives.

Pisano's most famous apprentice was Andrea di Cione, better known as Andrea Orcagna. Another of his apprentices, Giovanni di Balduccio, executed the shrine of Sant'Eustorgio in Milan.

== Gallery ==
Sculptures in the Museo dell'Opera del Duomo, Florence

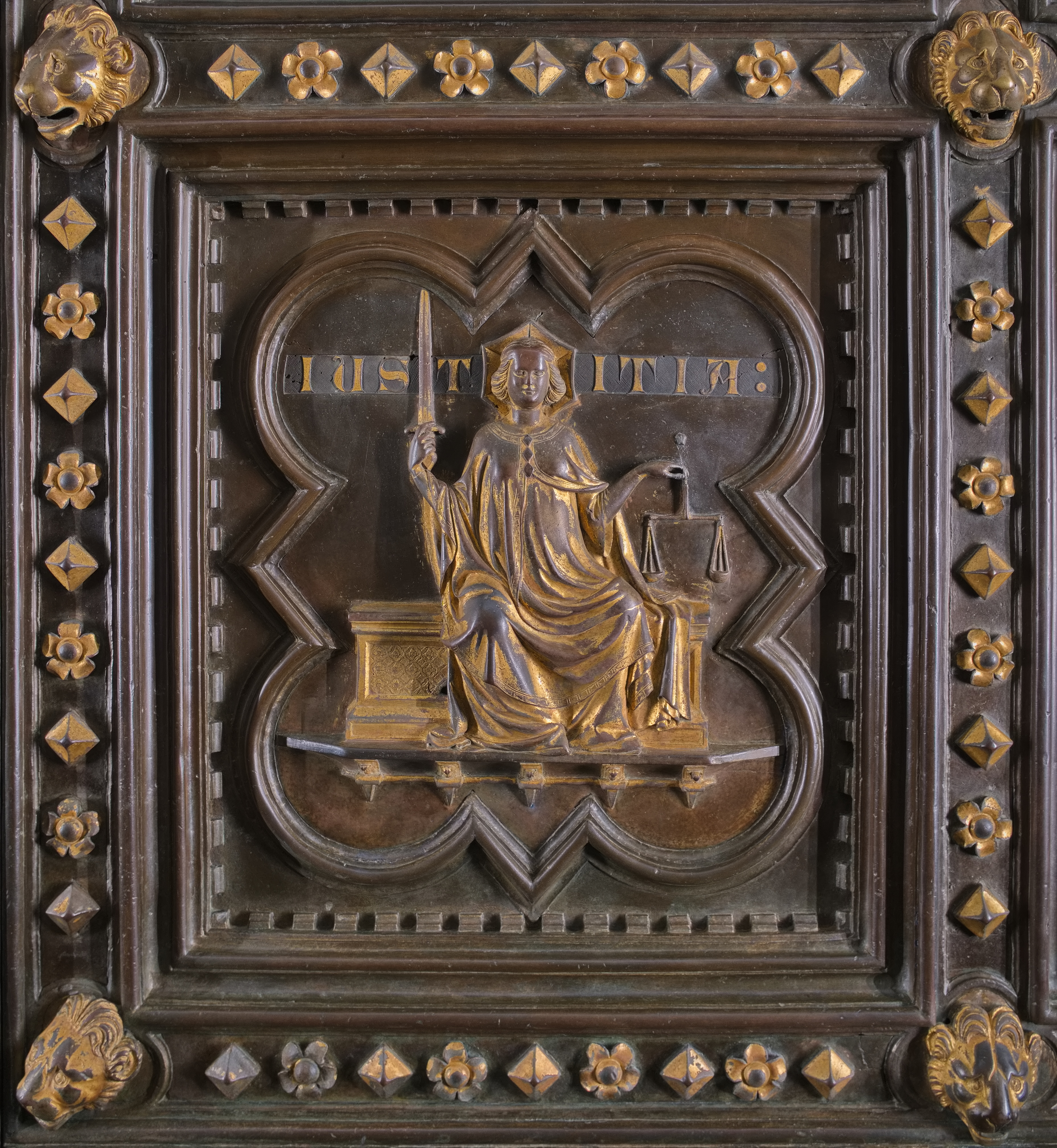
Justitia from the south door of Florence Baptistery, 1330–36

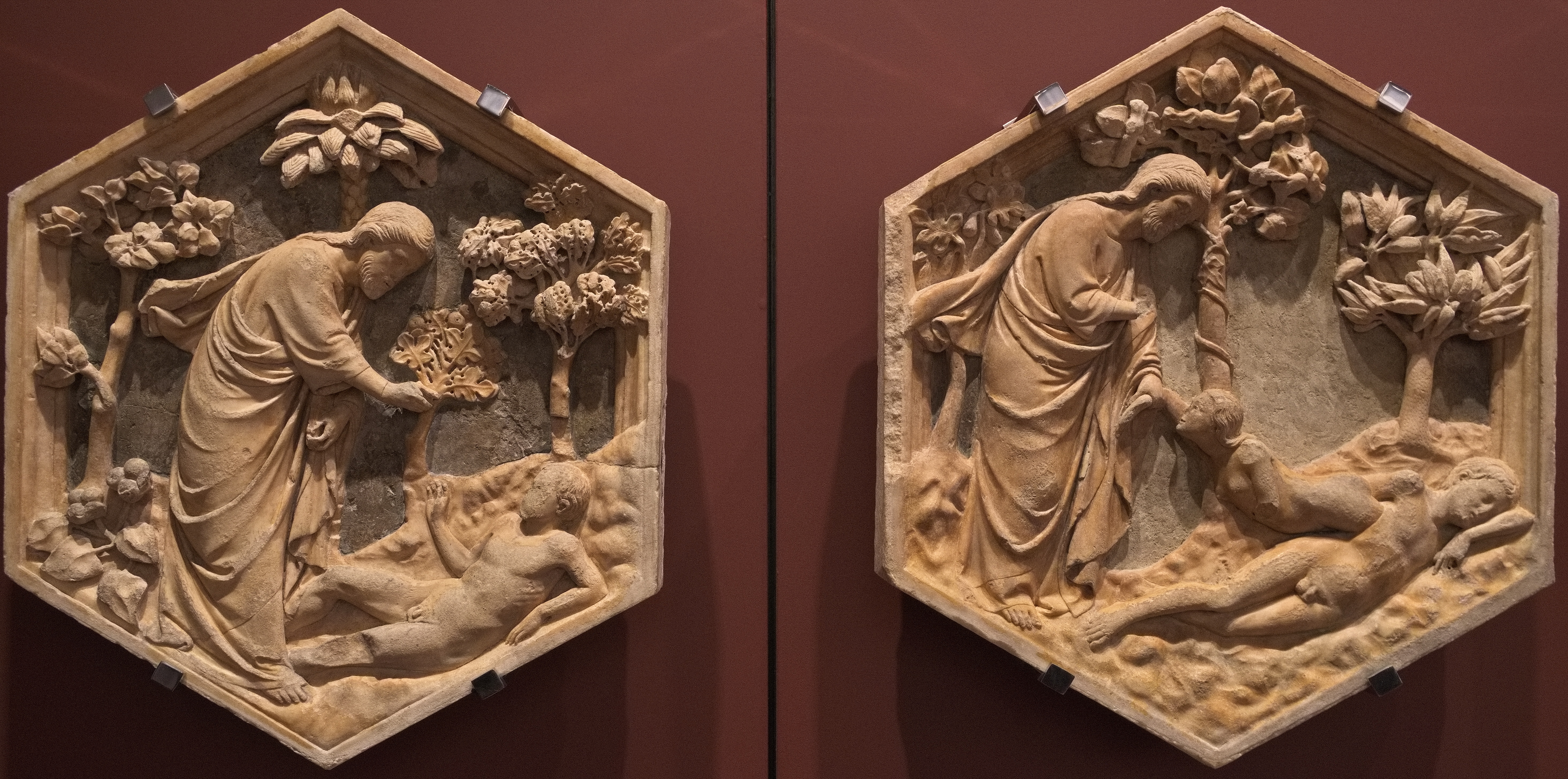
The Creation of Adam and Eve, 1334–43

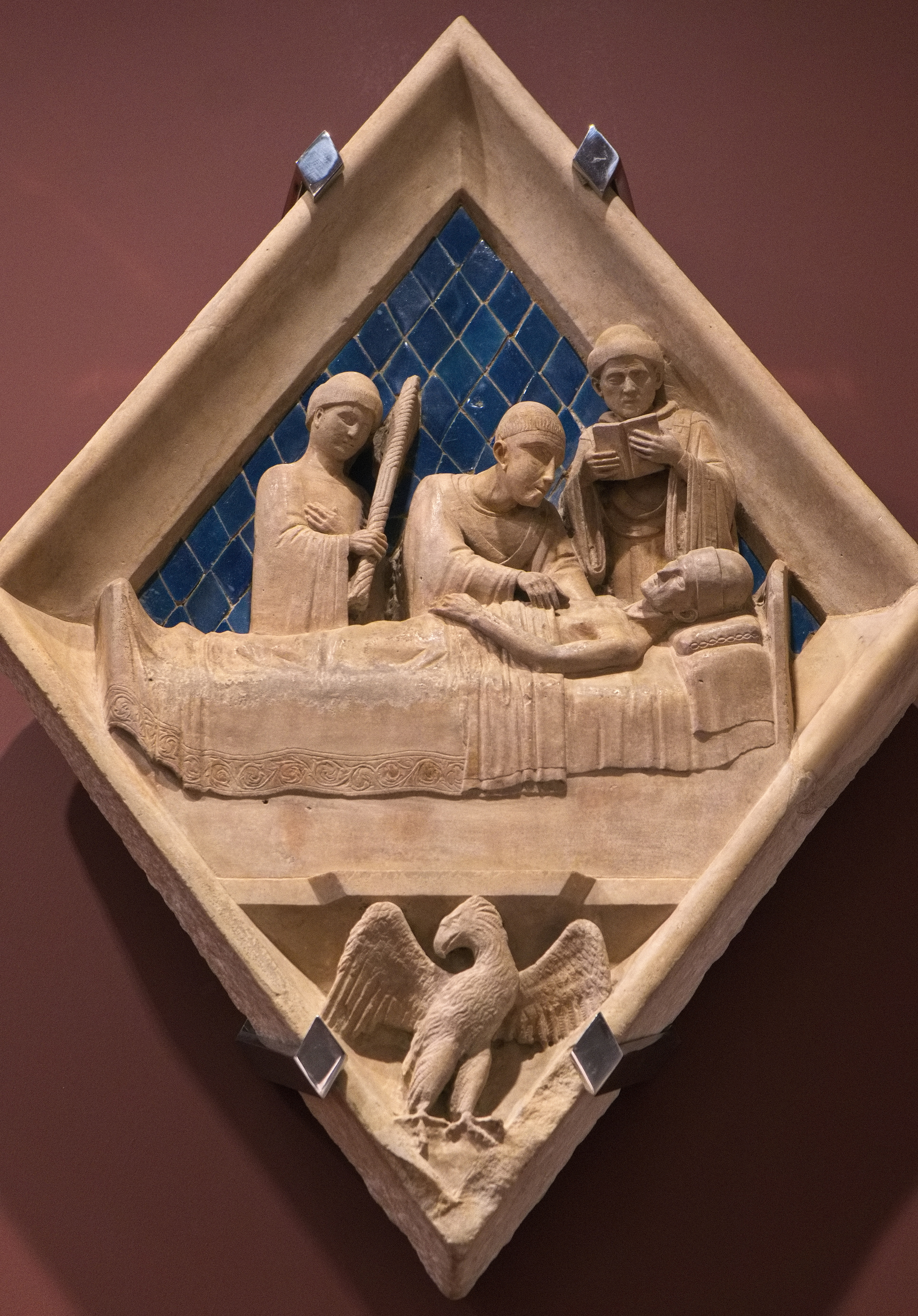
The Sacrament of Extreme Unction, 1343–60

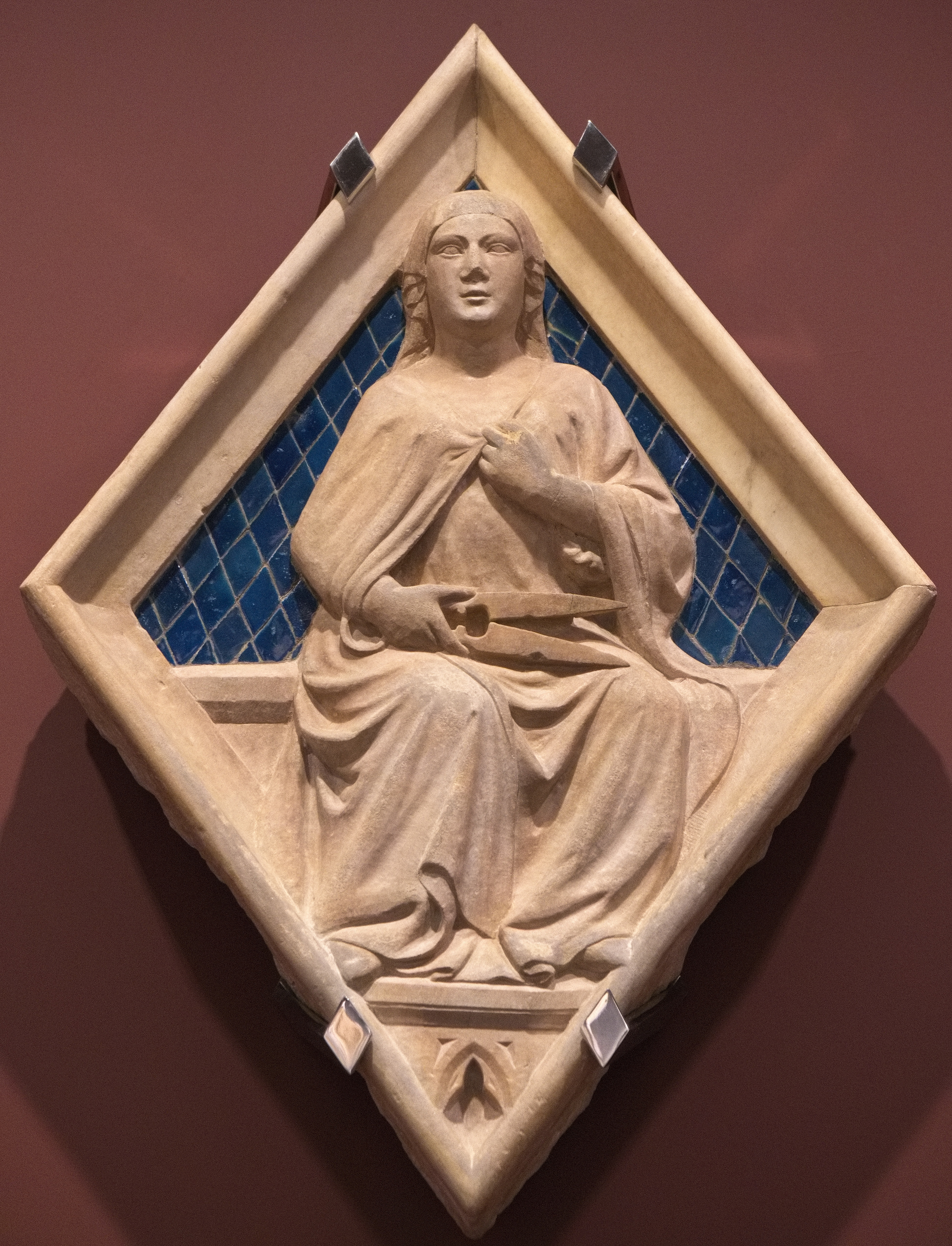
Geometry, c. 1343–60

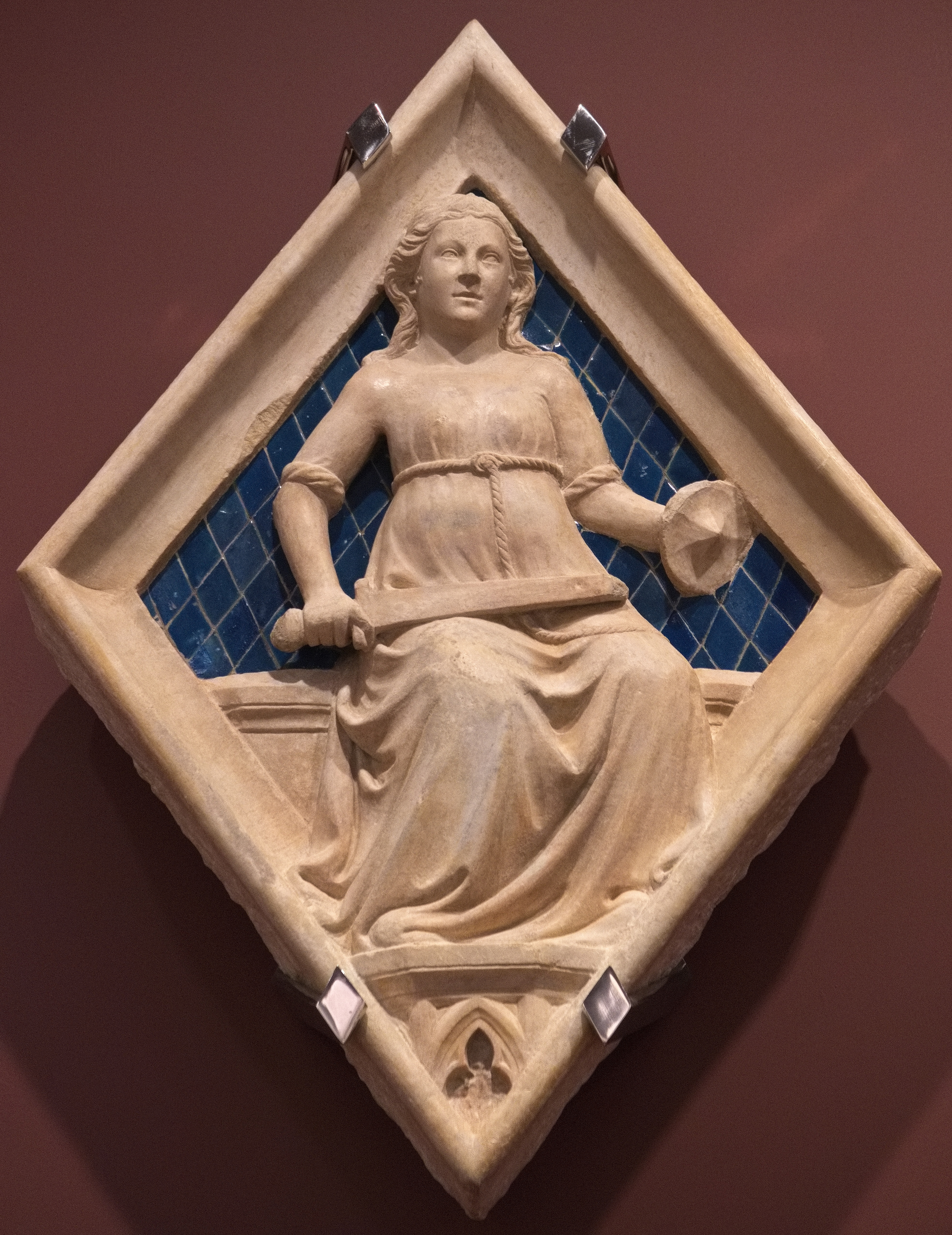
Rhetoric, c. 1343–60

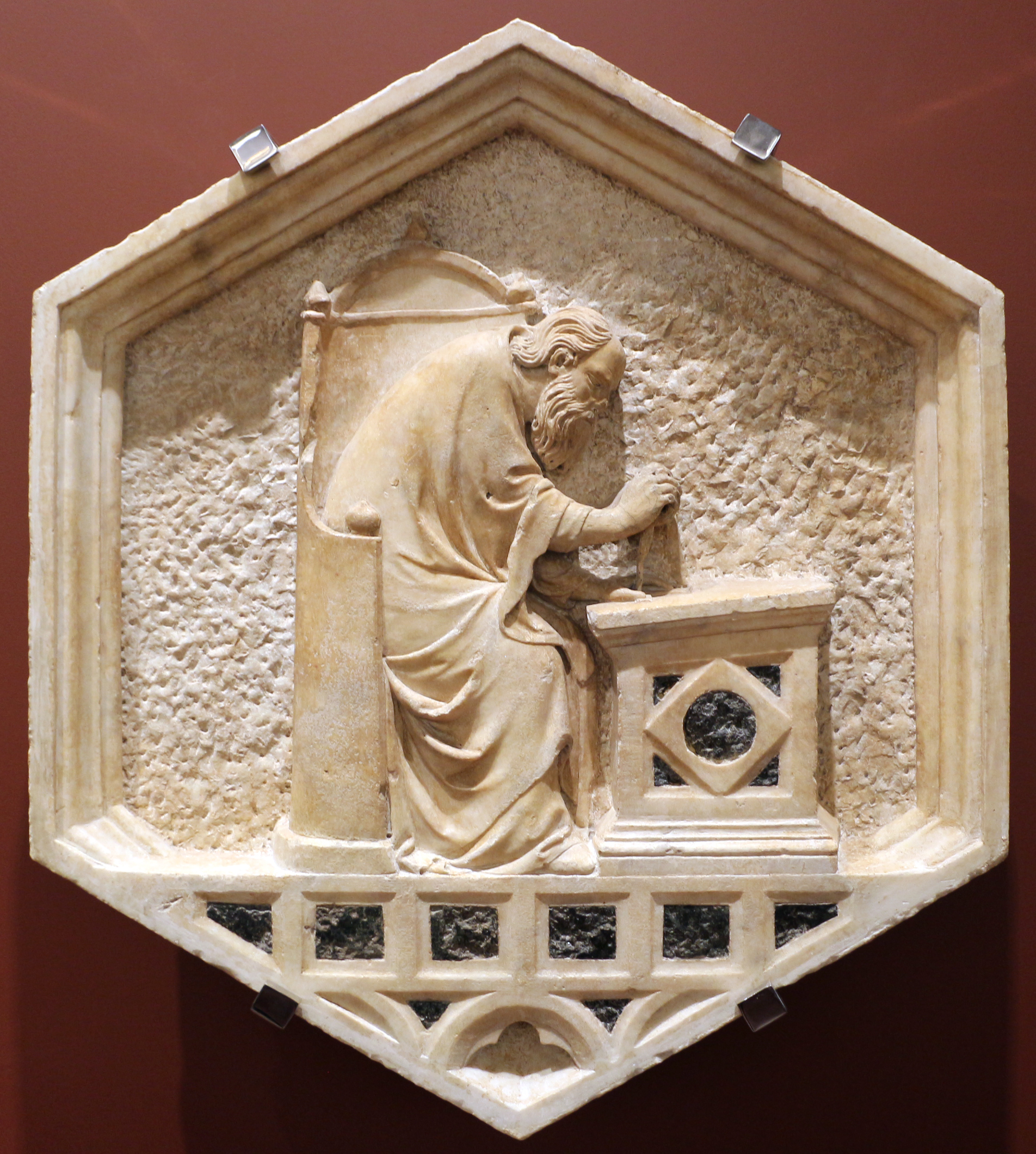
Architecture, 1348–50

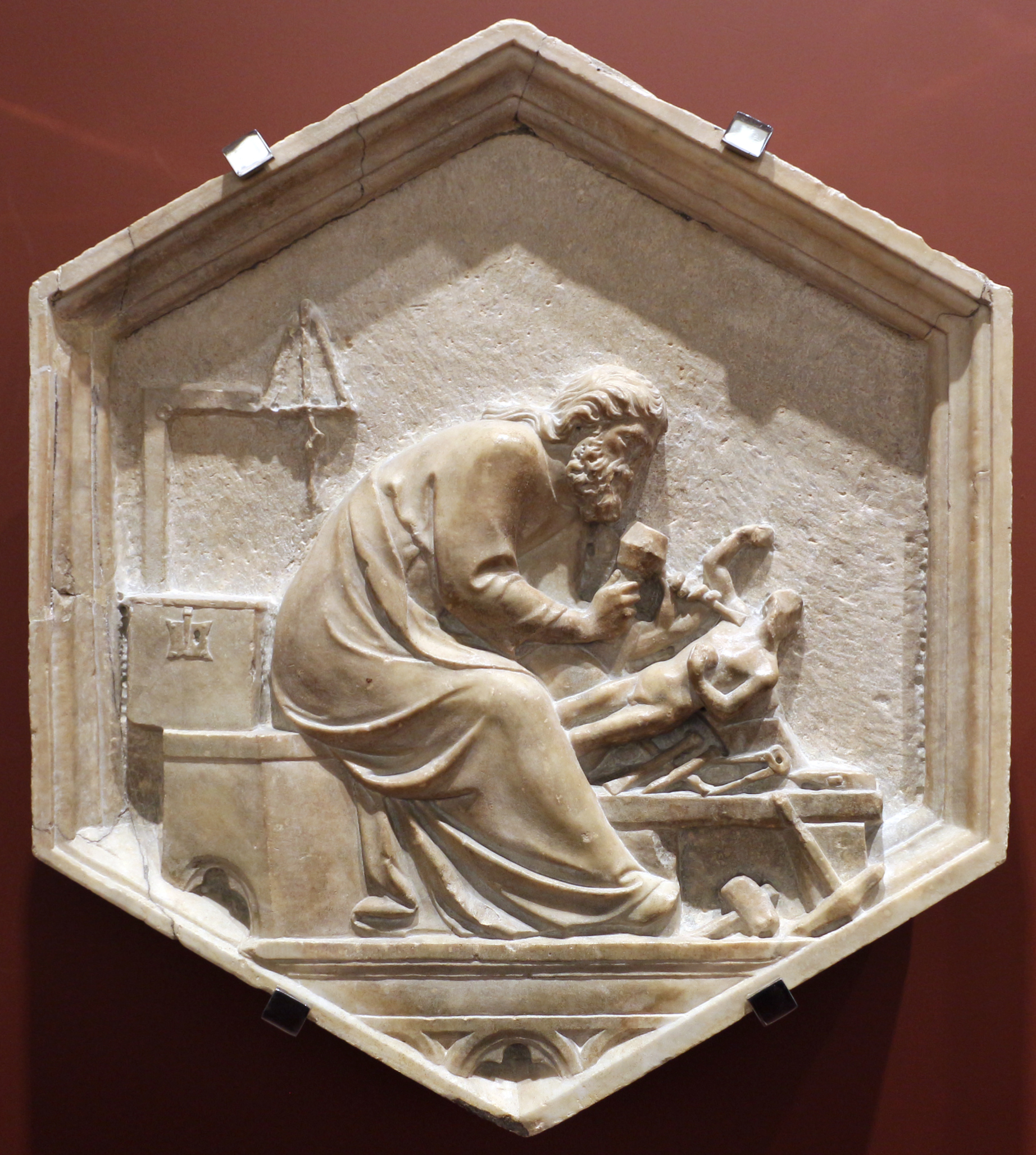
Phidias (sculpture), 1348-50

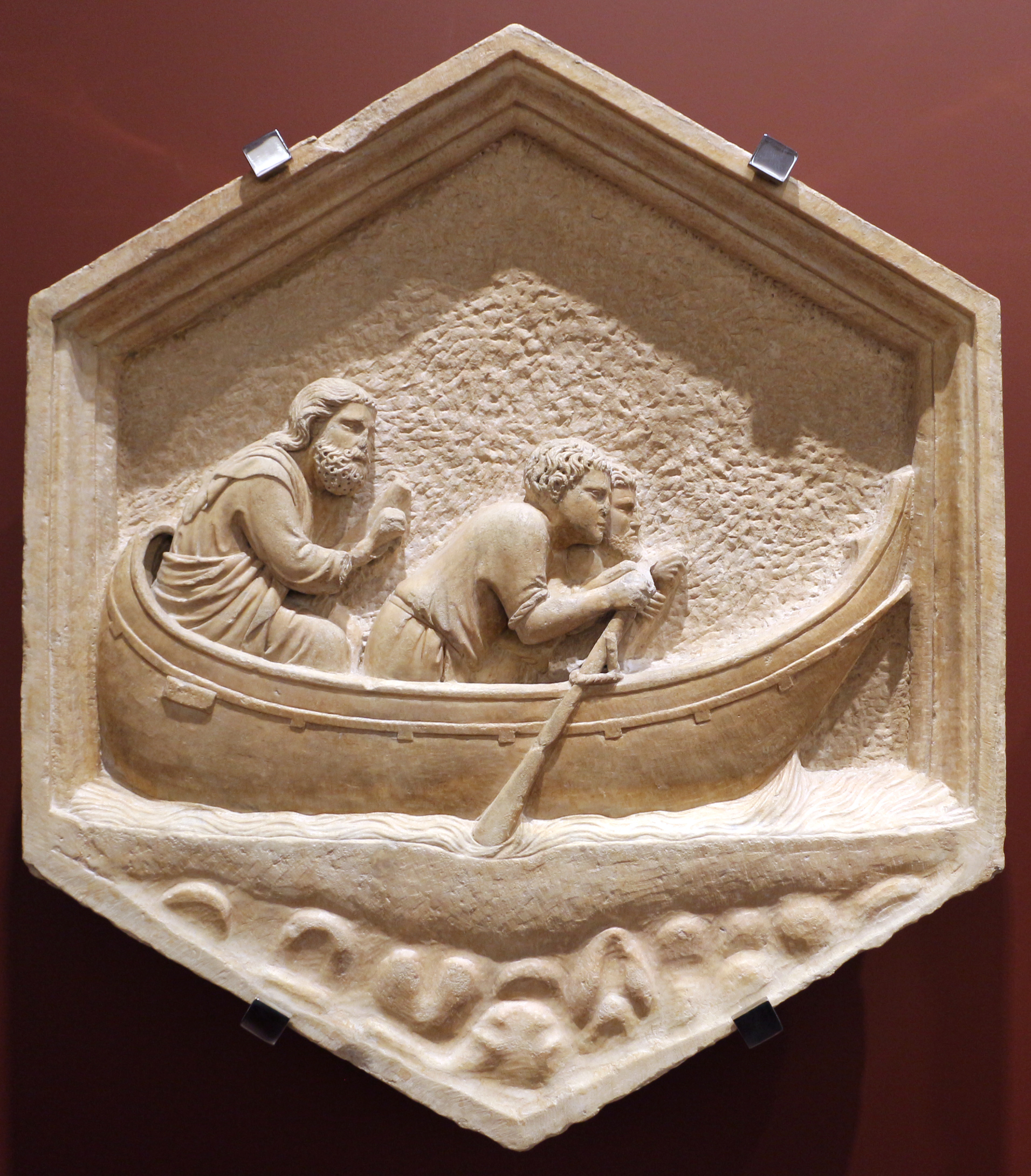
Navigation, c. 1343–60

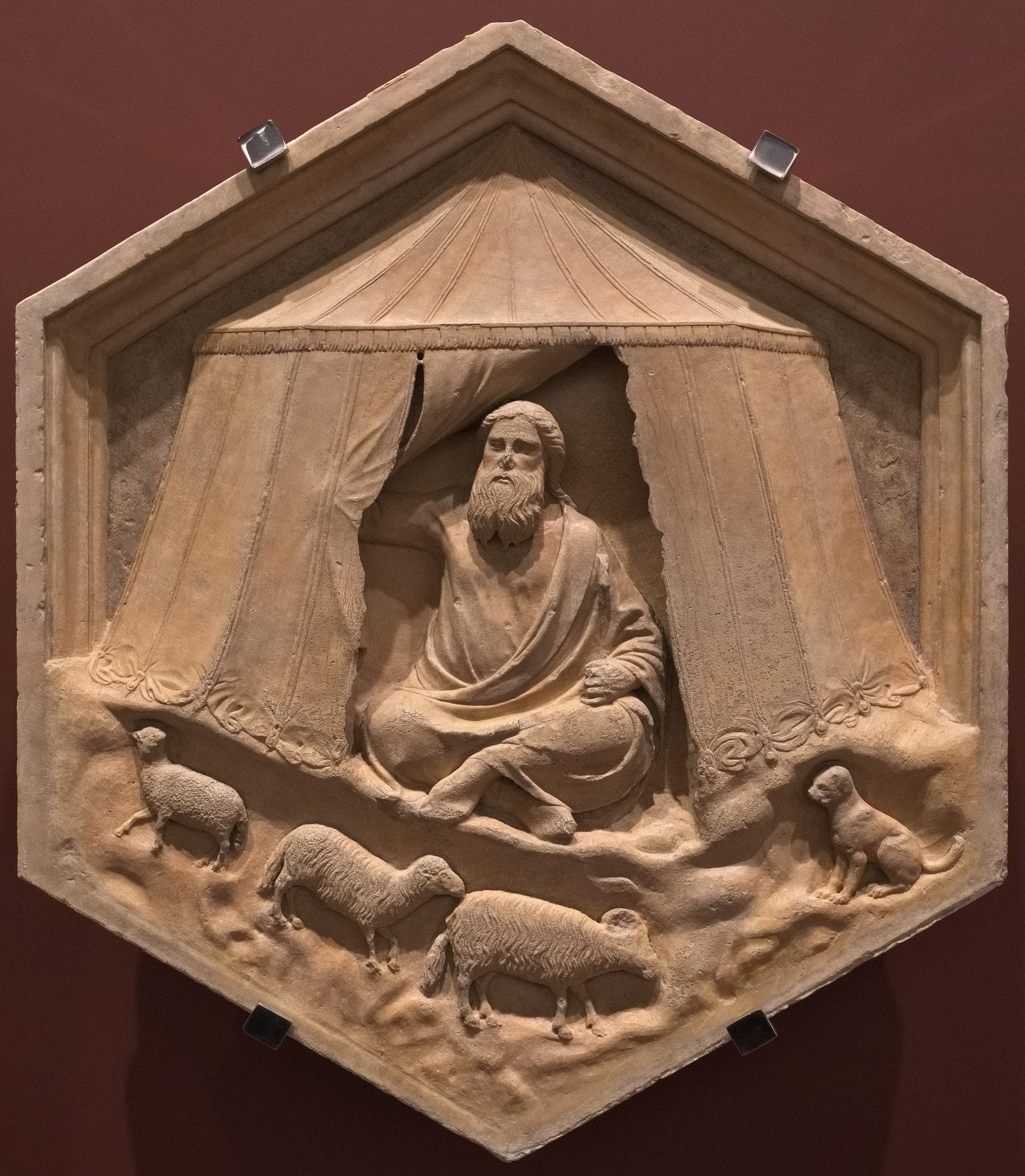
Jabal (sheep herding), 1334–43

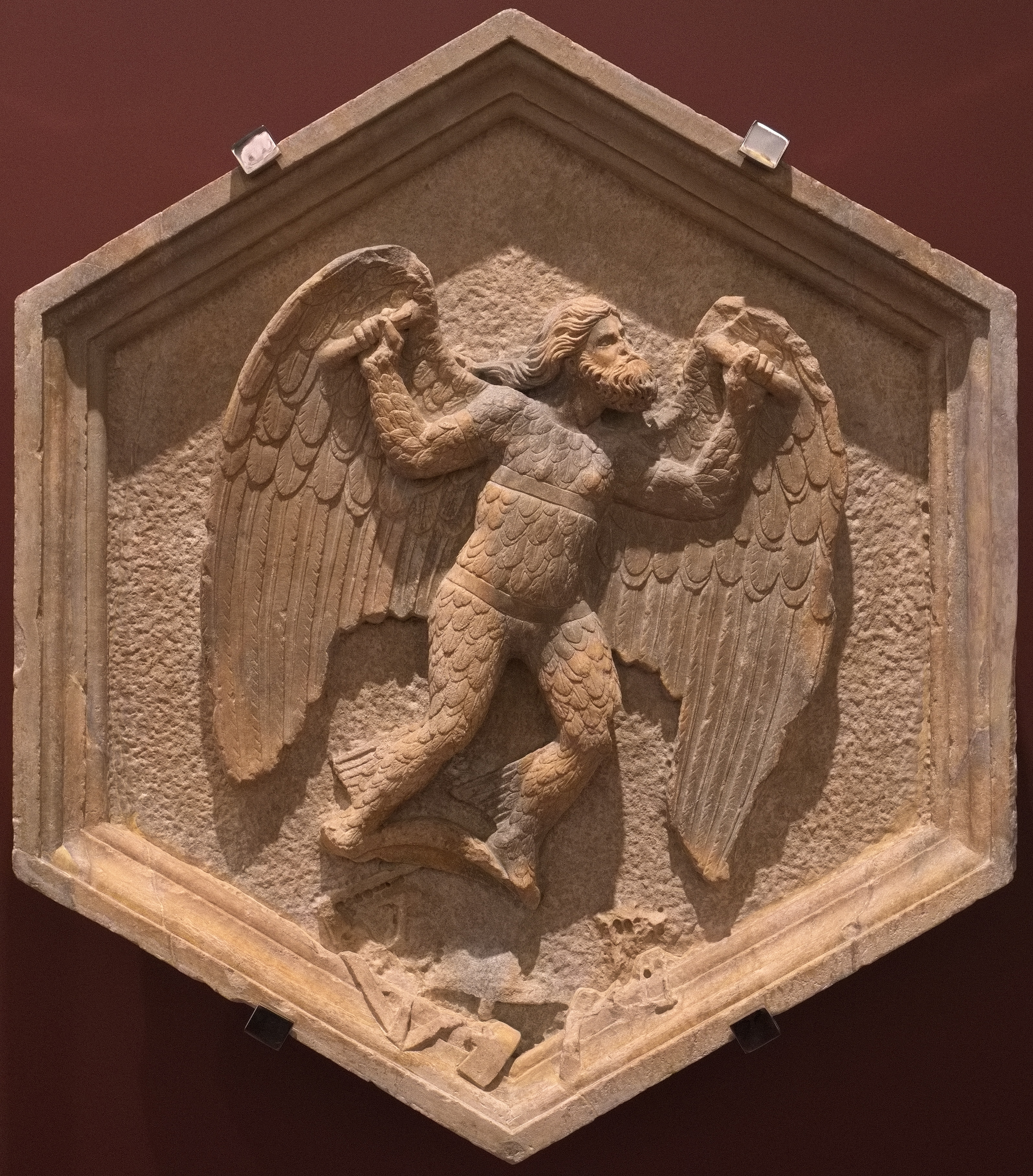
Daedalus, 1348–50

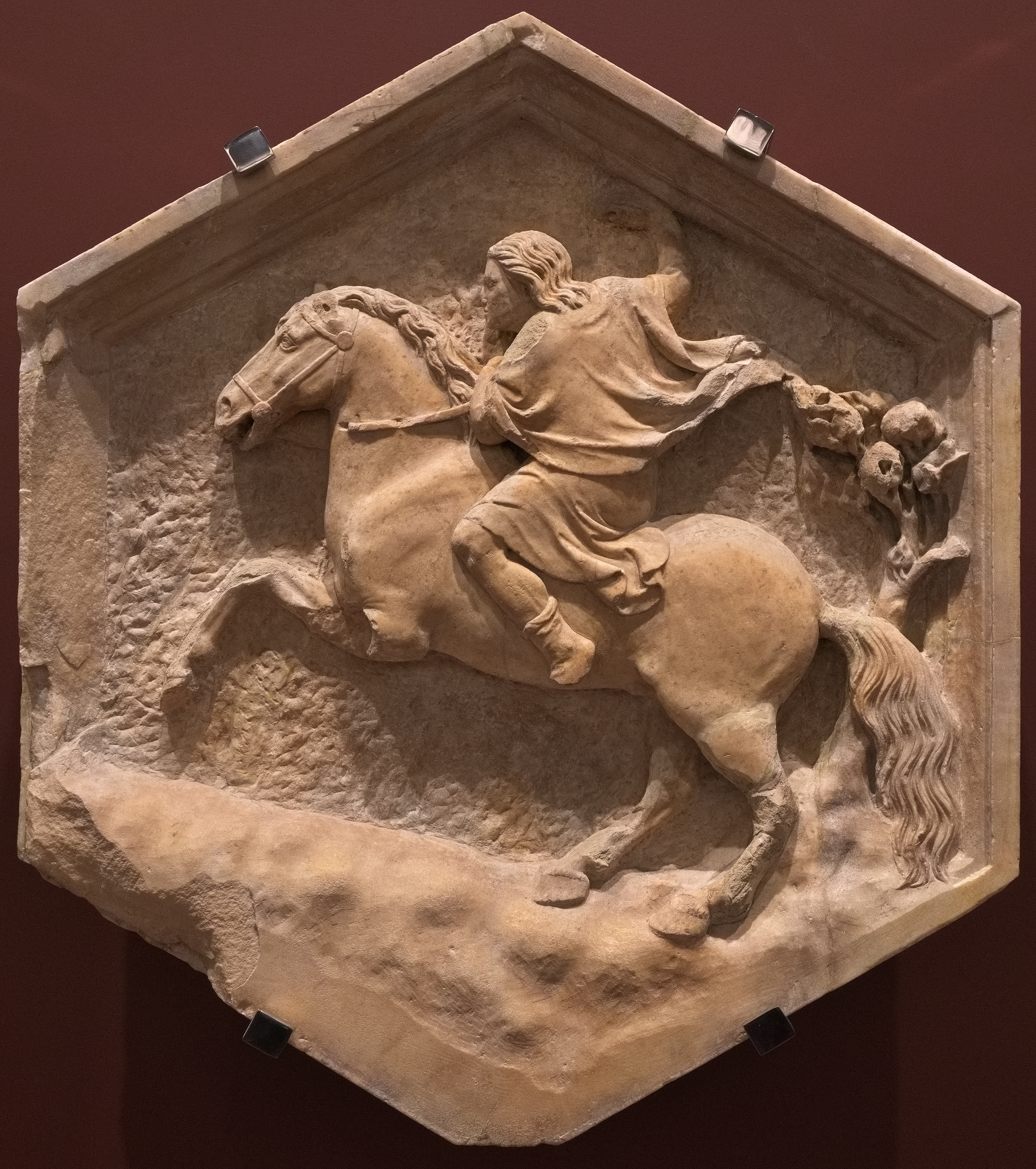
Horse riding, 1348–50

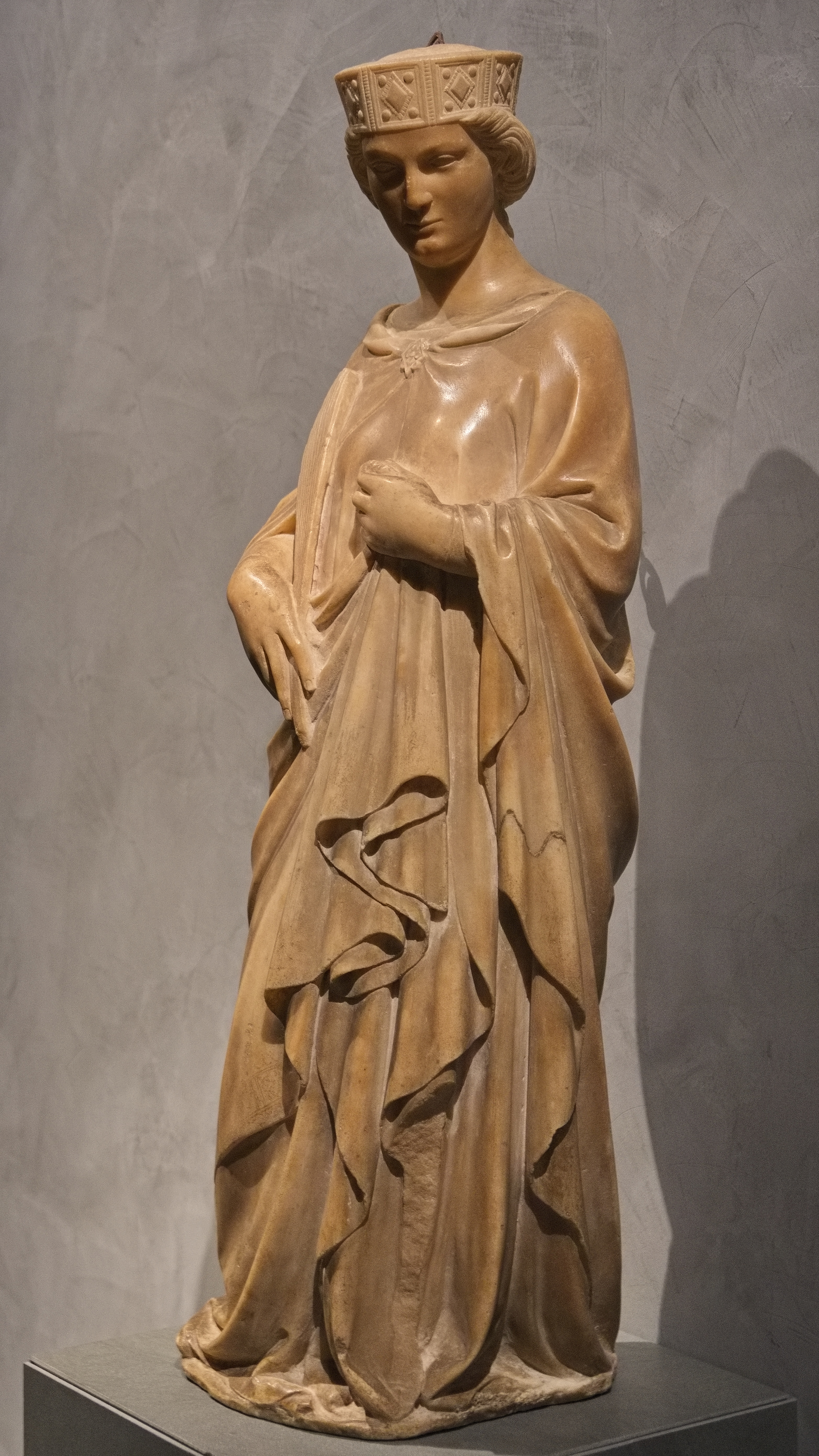
Santa Reparata, 1337–40

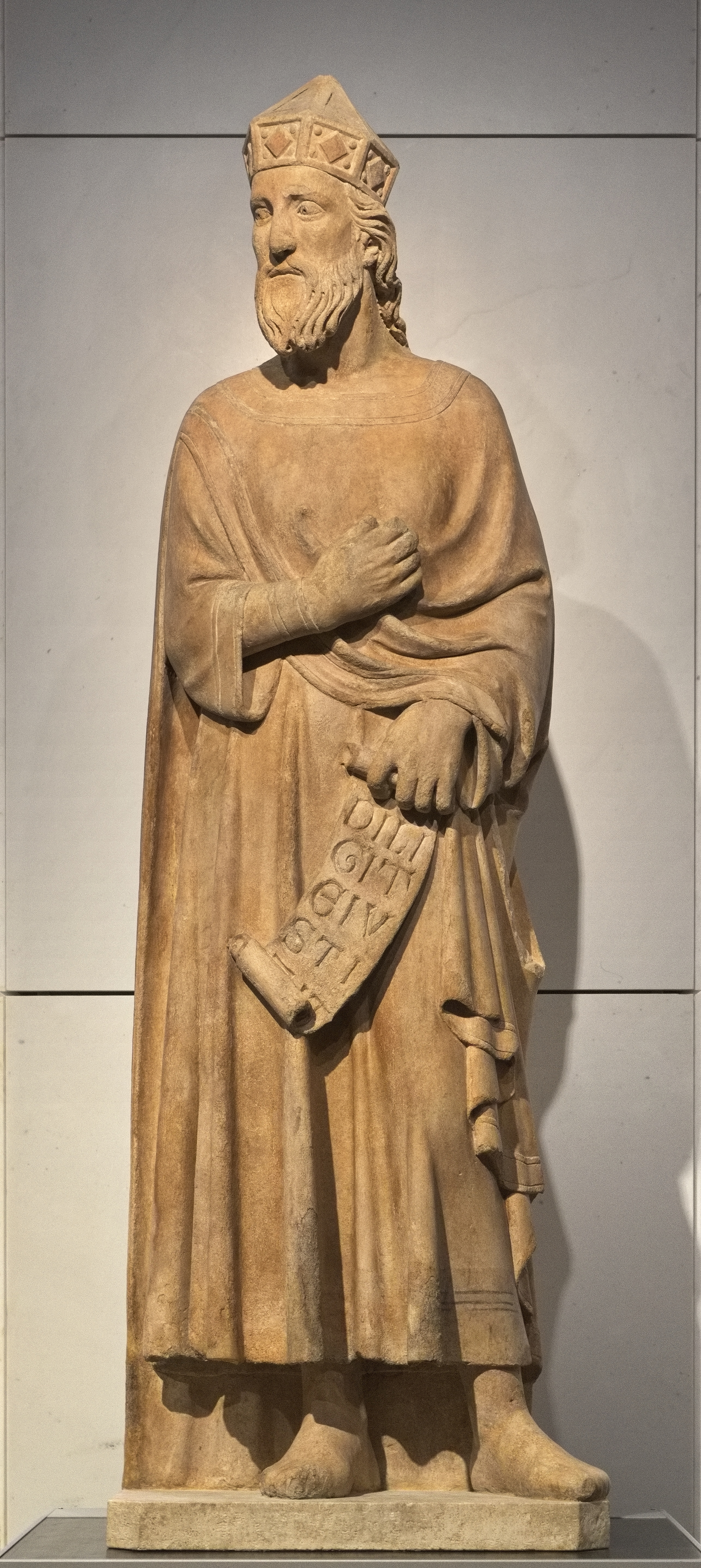
King Salomon, 1337–41
Sculptures from Santa Maria della Spina in Pisa

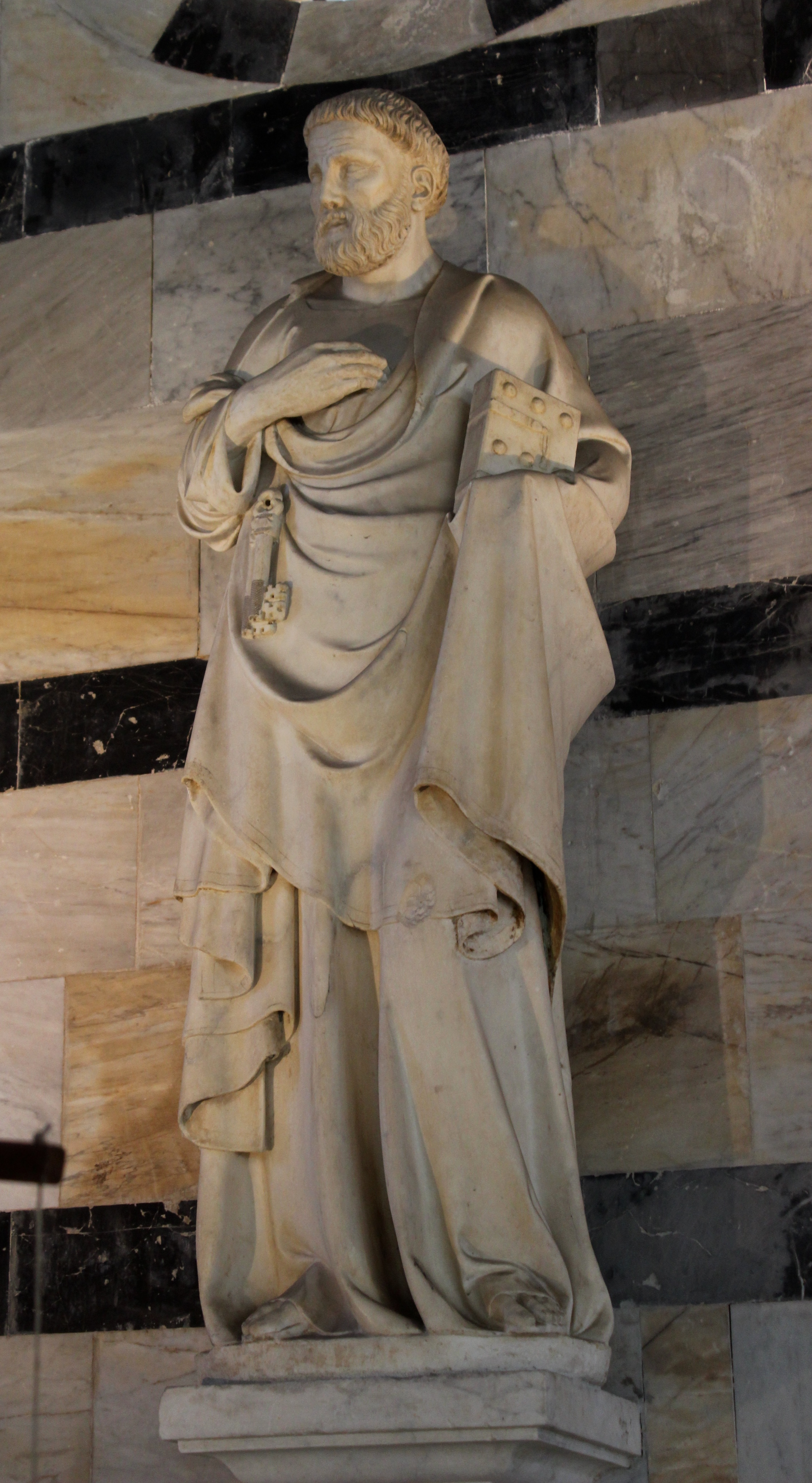
San Pietro

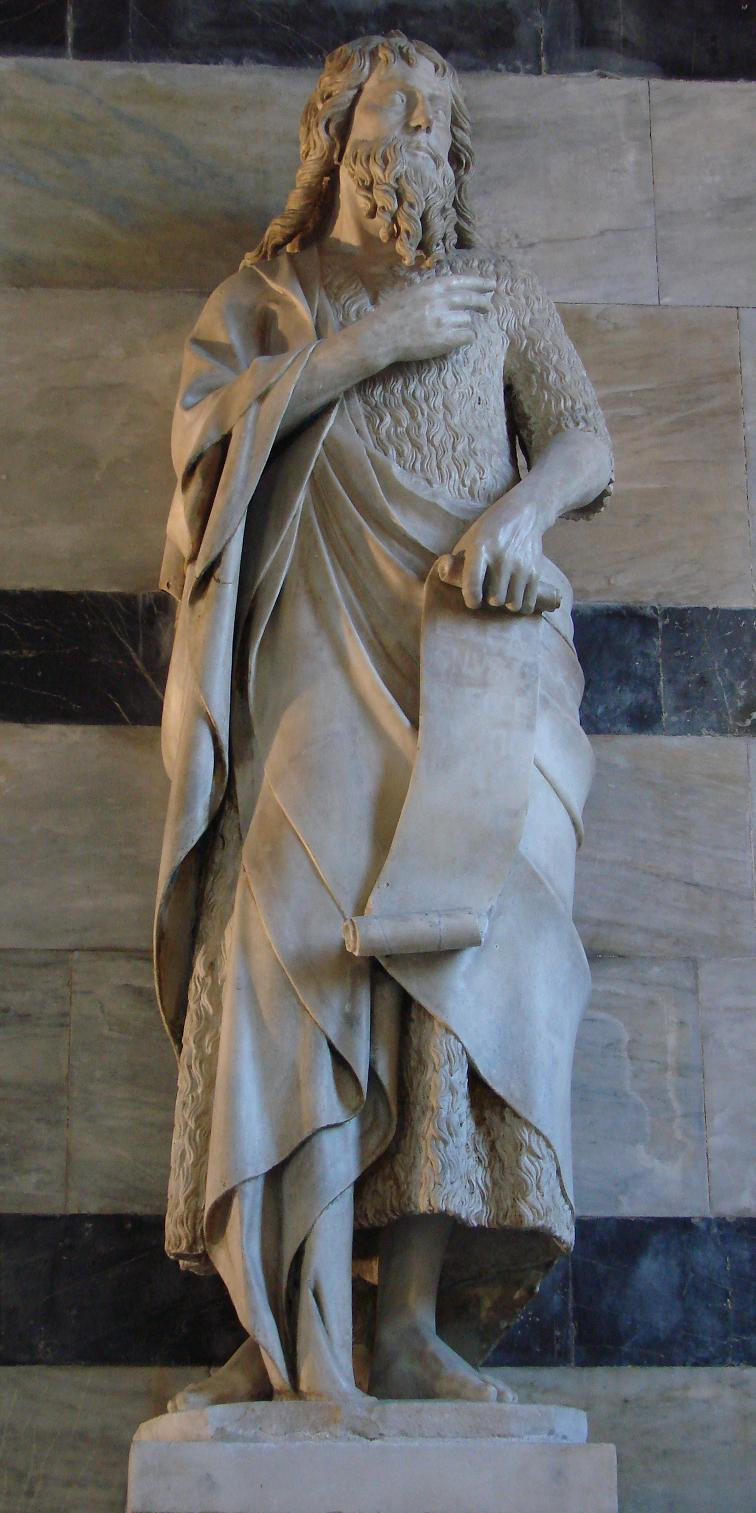
San Giovanni

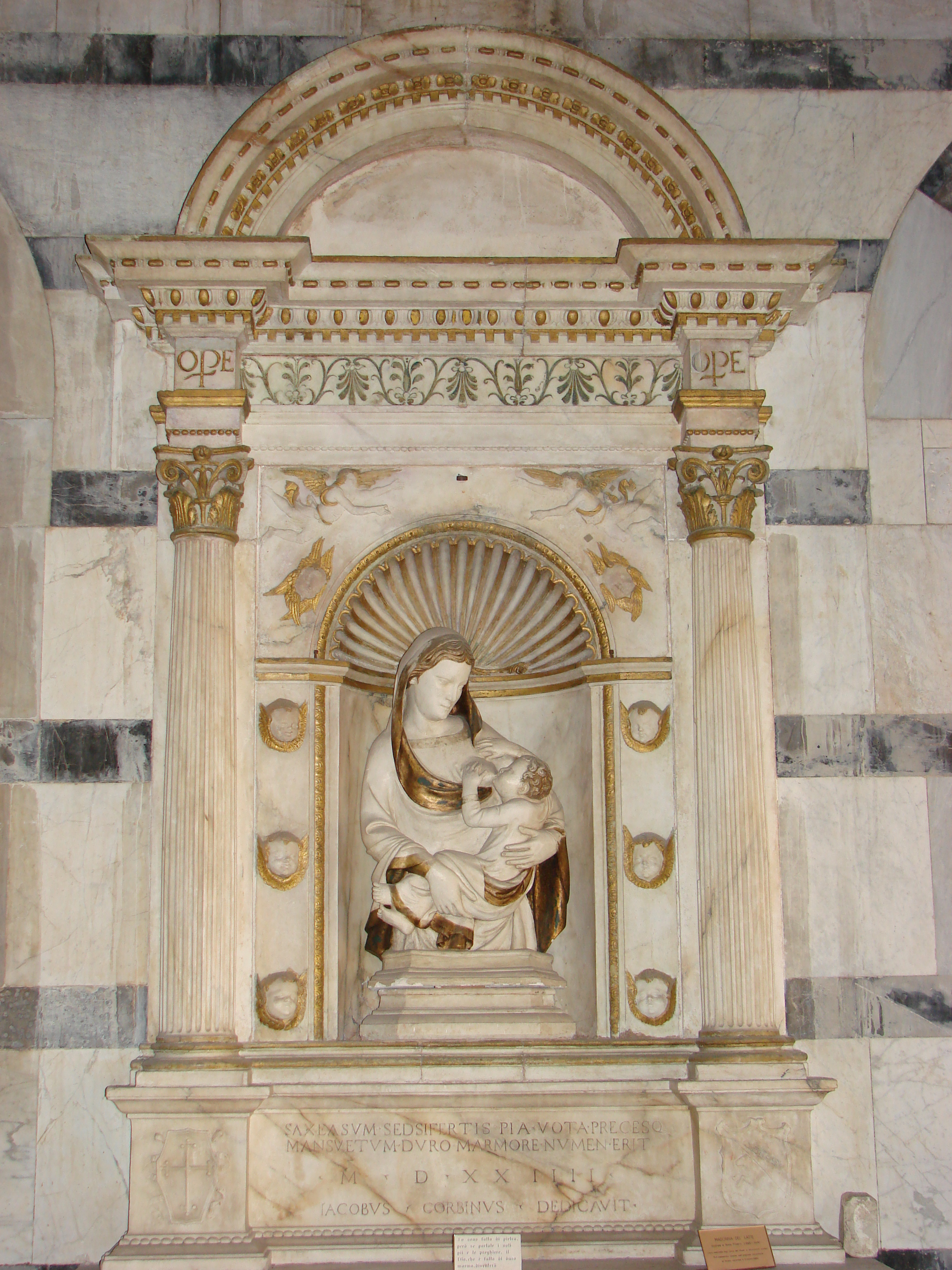
Madonna del Latte (copy)
