= Santa Maria della Spina =

Church in Pisa, Italy

Coordinates: 43°42′55″N 10°23′47″E

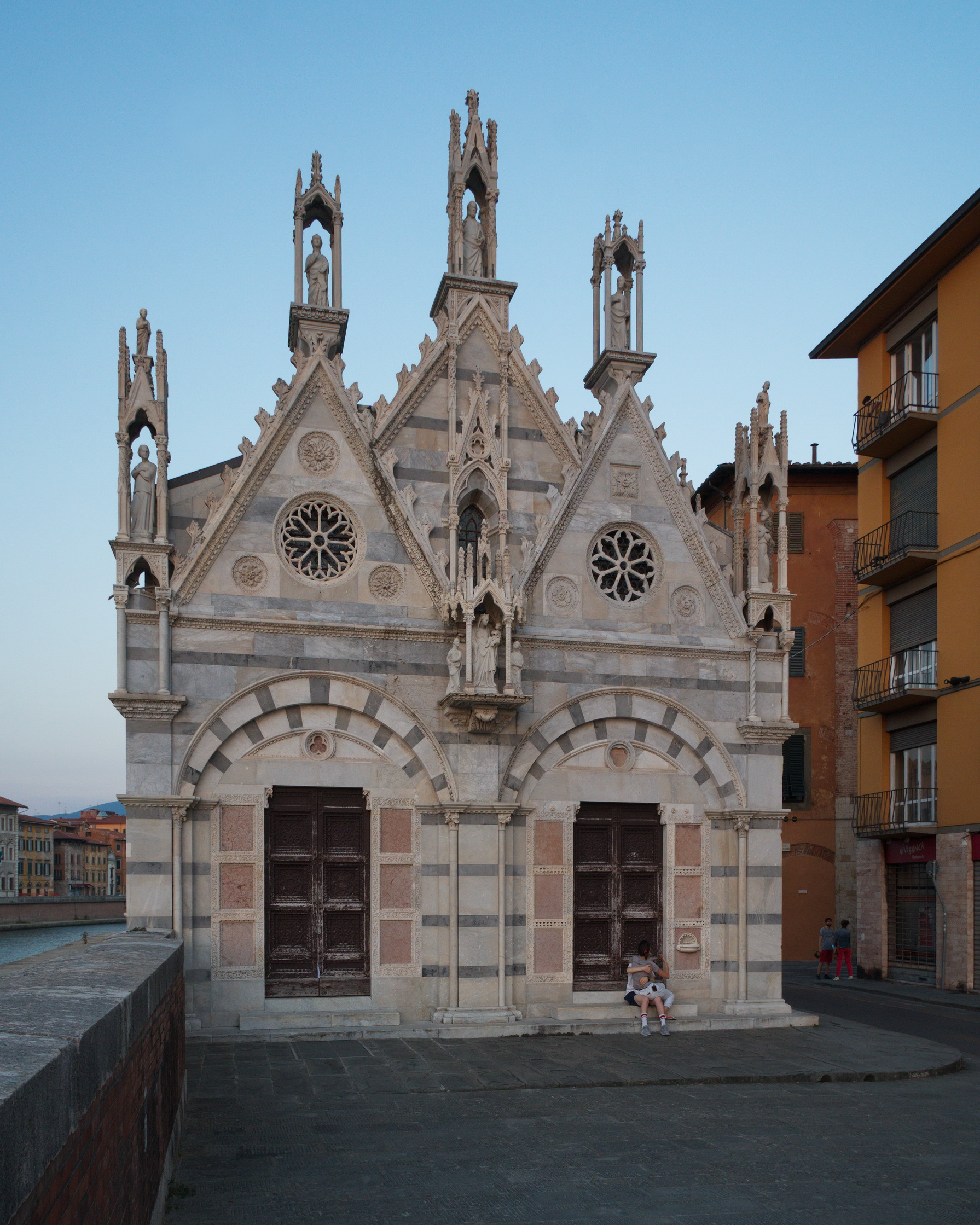
Santa Maria della Spina, west front

Santa Maria della Spina is a small church in the Italian city of Pisa. The church, erected around 1230 in the Pisan Gothic style, and enlarged after 1325, was originally known as Santa Maria di Pontenovo for the newer bridge that existed nearby, collapsed in the 15th century, and was never rebuilt.

The name of della Spina ("of the thorn") derives from the presence of a thorn, putatively part of the crown of thorns placed on Christ during his Passion and Crucifixion. The relic was brought to this church in 1333. In 1871 the church was dismantled and rebuilt on a higher level due to dangerous infiltration of water from the Arno river. The church was altered in the process, however, and John Ruskin, who visited Pisa in 1872, was outraged about the restoration. The church no longer houses the “thorn”, it is now on display in the Chiesa di Santa Chiara on Via Roma.

The church of Santa Maria della Spina has always been administered by the city, except for short interruptions in the seventeenth and eighteenth centuries when it fell to the responsibility of the local hospital.

== Exterior ==
The church is a gem of Gothic architecture in Italy. The small structure has a rectangular ground plan, and is built of marble, laid in polychrome bands. The exterior appearance is marked by cusps, tympani and tabernacles, together with a rich sculptural decoration with tarsiae, rose-windows and numerous statues from the main Pisane artists of the early 14th century. These include Giovanni Pisano, Lupo di Francesco, Andrea Pisano with his sons Nino and Tommaso, and Giovanni di Balduccio.

The façade has two gates with lintelled arches. Among these lies the tabernacle with the statues of Madonna with the Child and two Angels, attributed to Giovanni Pisano. Two niches open in the upper part of the façade: these house the statue of Christ among the two Annunciation ones, and two other angels.

The south façade, alongside the street, is also abundantly furnished with cusps and thirteen statues of the Apostles and Christ by Lupo's workshop. The small sculptures over the tympani portraying Saints and Angels are from Nino Pisano's workshop, while the niche in the right pillar has a Madonna and Child by Giovanni di Balduccio.

The east side has three round arches with simple windows. The tympani are decorated with the Evangelists' symbols, intervalled by niches with the statues of the Saints Peter, Paul and John the Baptist. The high pyramid-like spires end with the statues of the Madonna with Child between two angels, by Nino Pisano.

== Interior ==
If compared to the rich exterior, the interior appears quite simple. It has a single room, with a ceiling painted during the 19th century reconstruction. In the presbytery's centre is one of the highest masterpieces of Gothic sculpture, the Madonna of the Rose by Andrea and Nino Pisano. On the left wall is the tabernacle in which once was the crown's relic, by Stagio Stagi (1534). Another statue by the Pisanos, the Madonna del Latte, was once here, but has been moved to the city's National Museum of San Matteo.

== Gallery ==
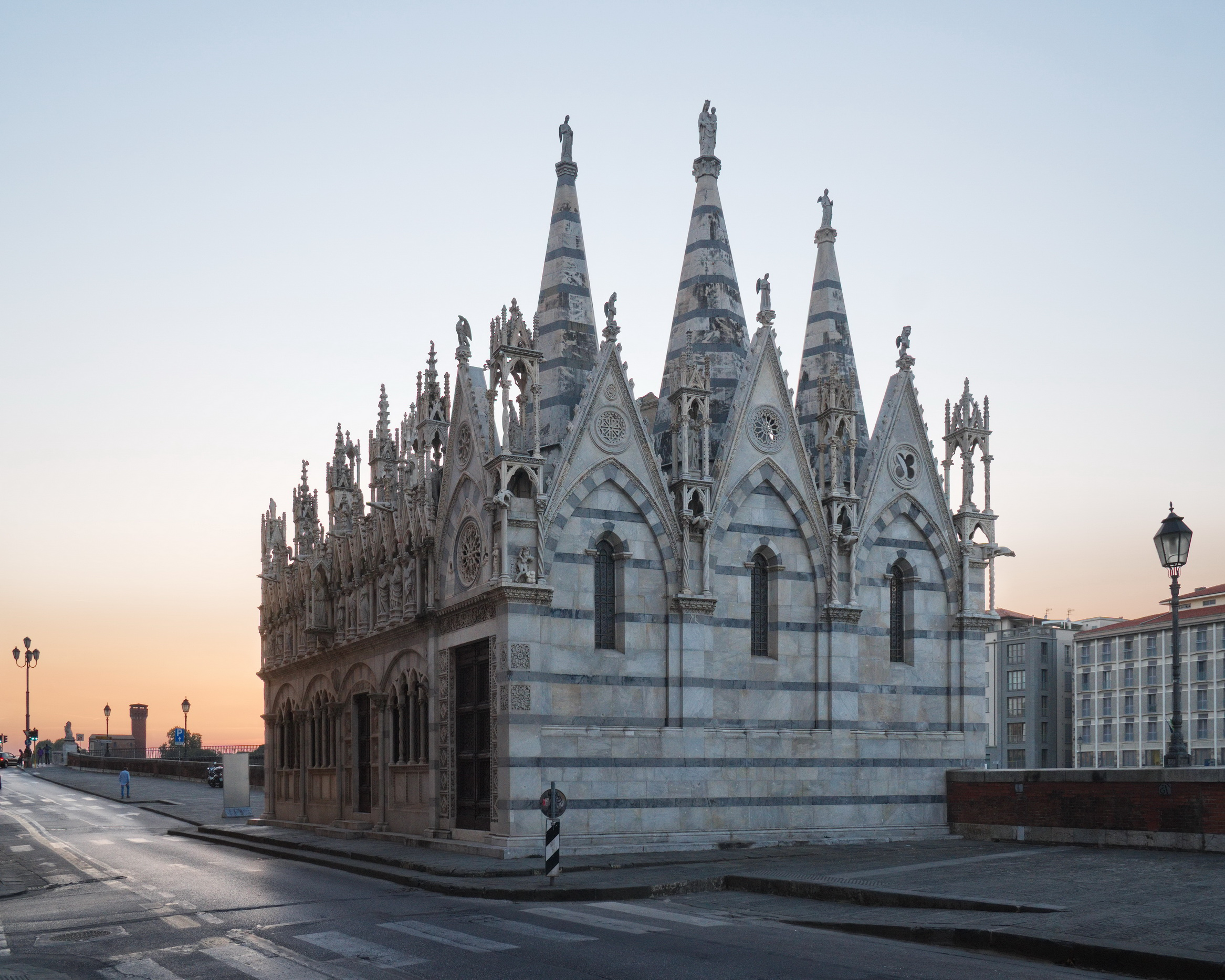
Santa Maria della Spina (from southeast)

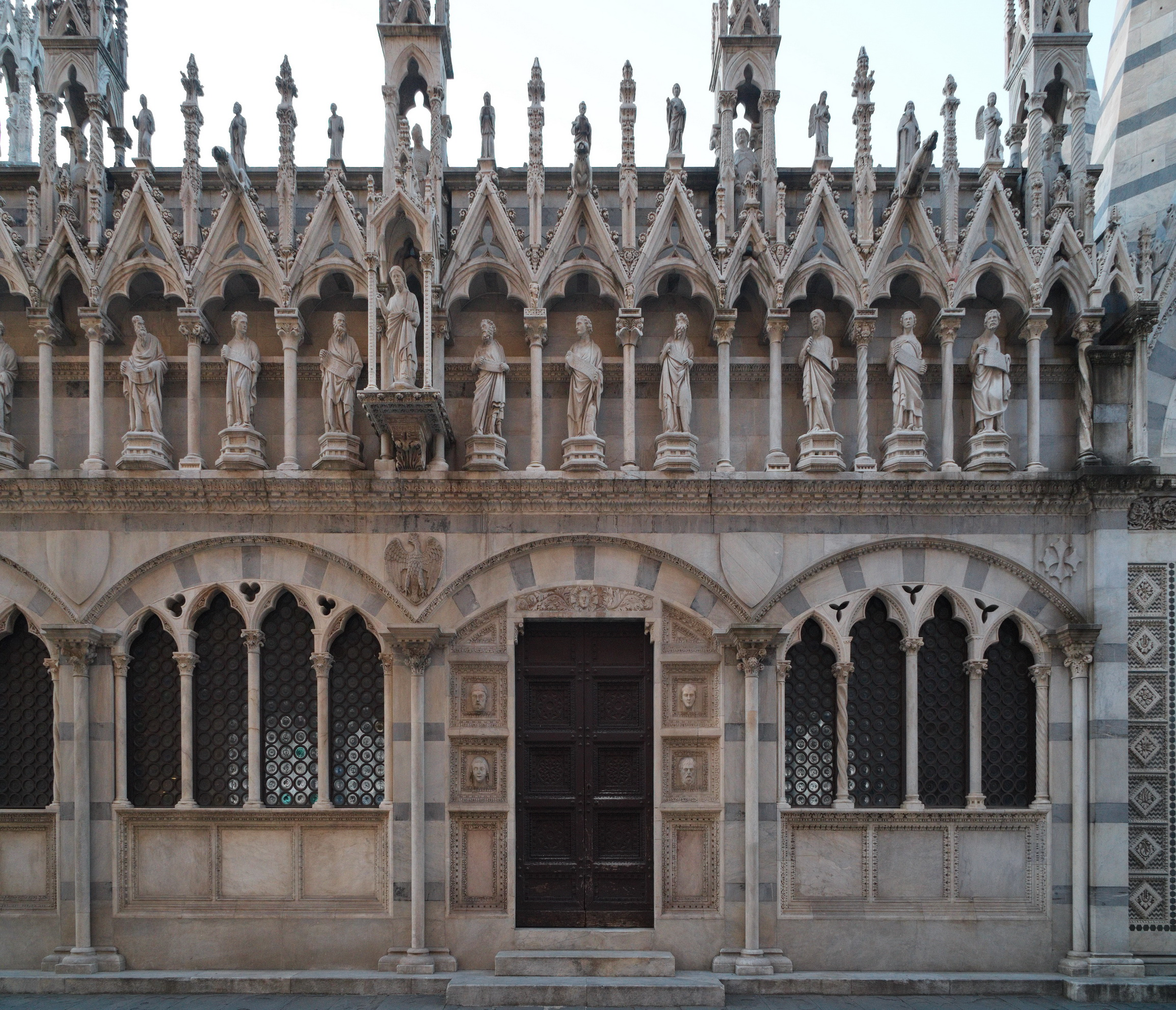
Santa Maria della Spina, Pisa, c.1230, part of south front

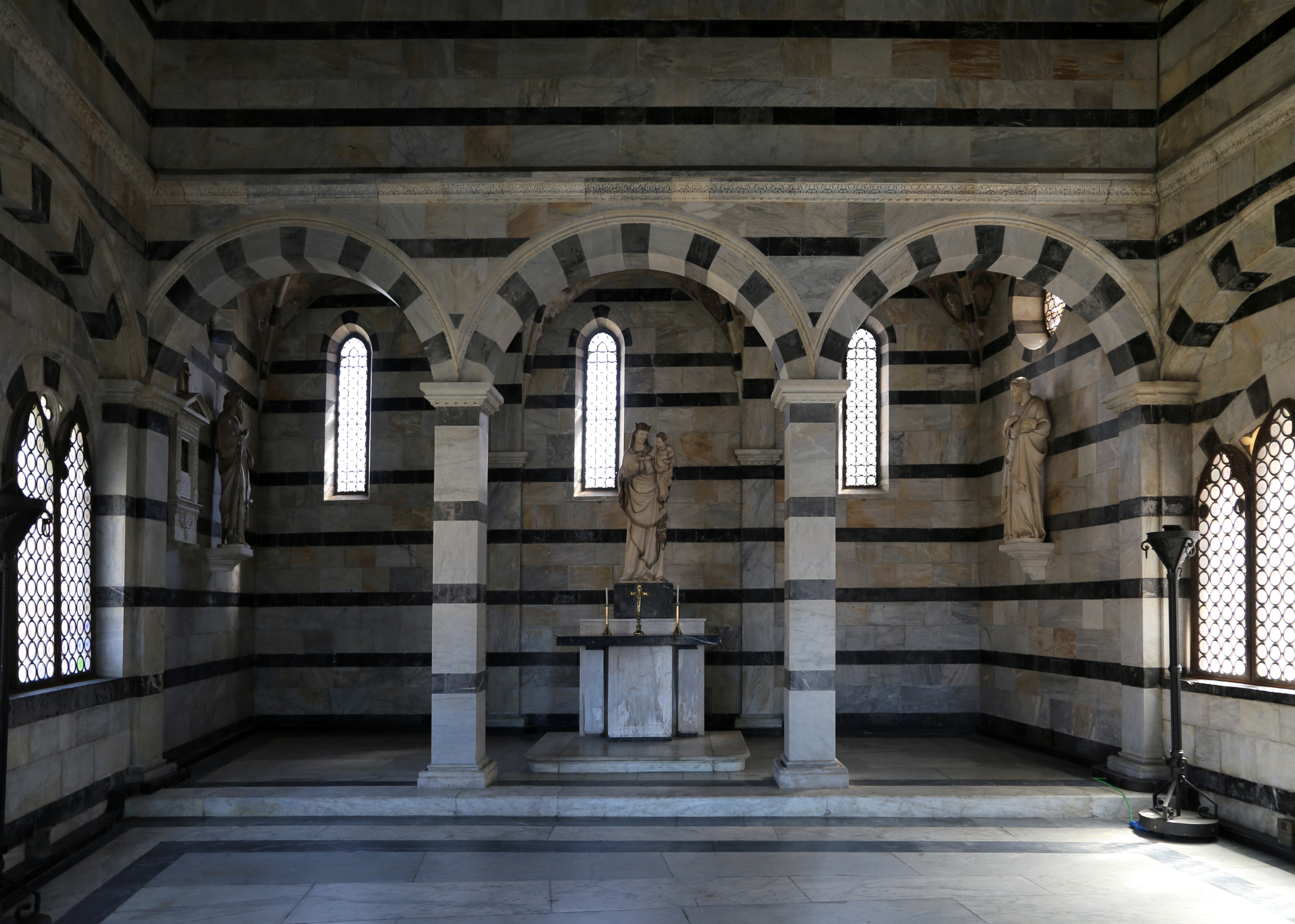
Interior with the Madonna of the Rose

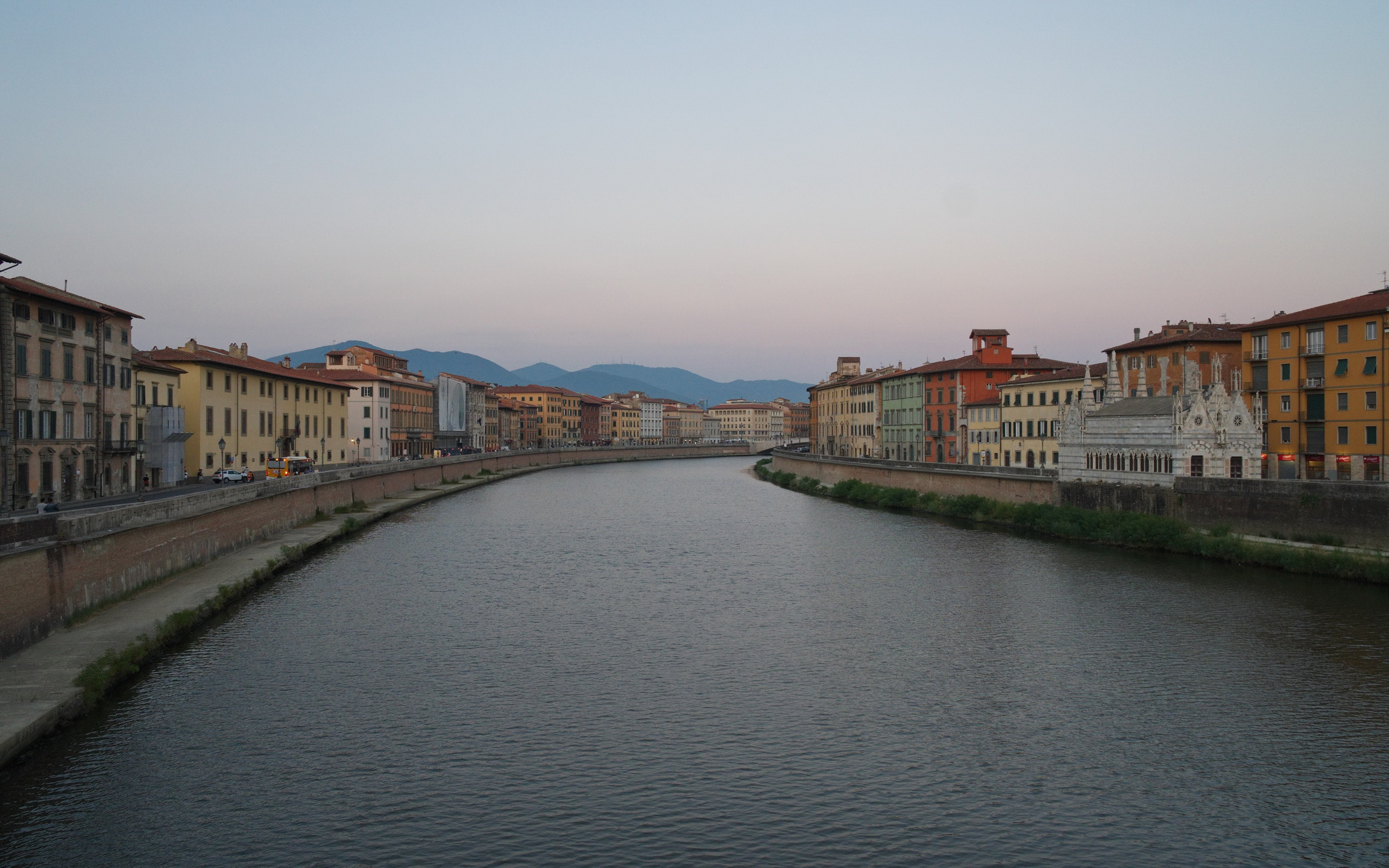
Pisa, Arno river from Ponte Solferino to the east, with Santa Maria della Spina on the south bank to the right

== See also ==
- Gothic architecture in Italy
