= Nino Pisano =

Italian sculptor

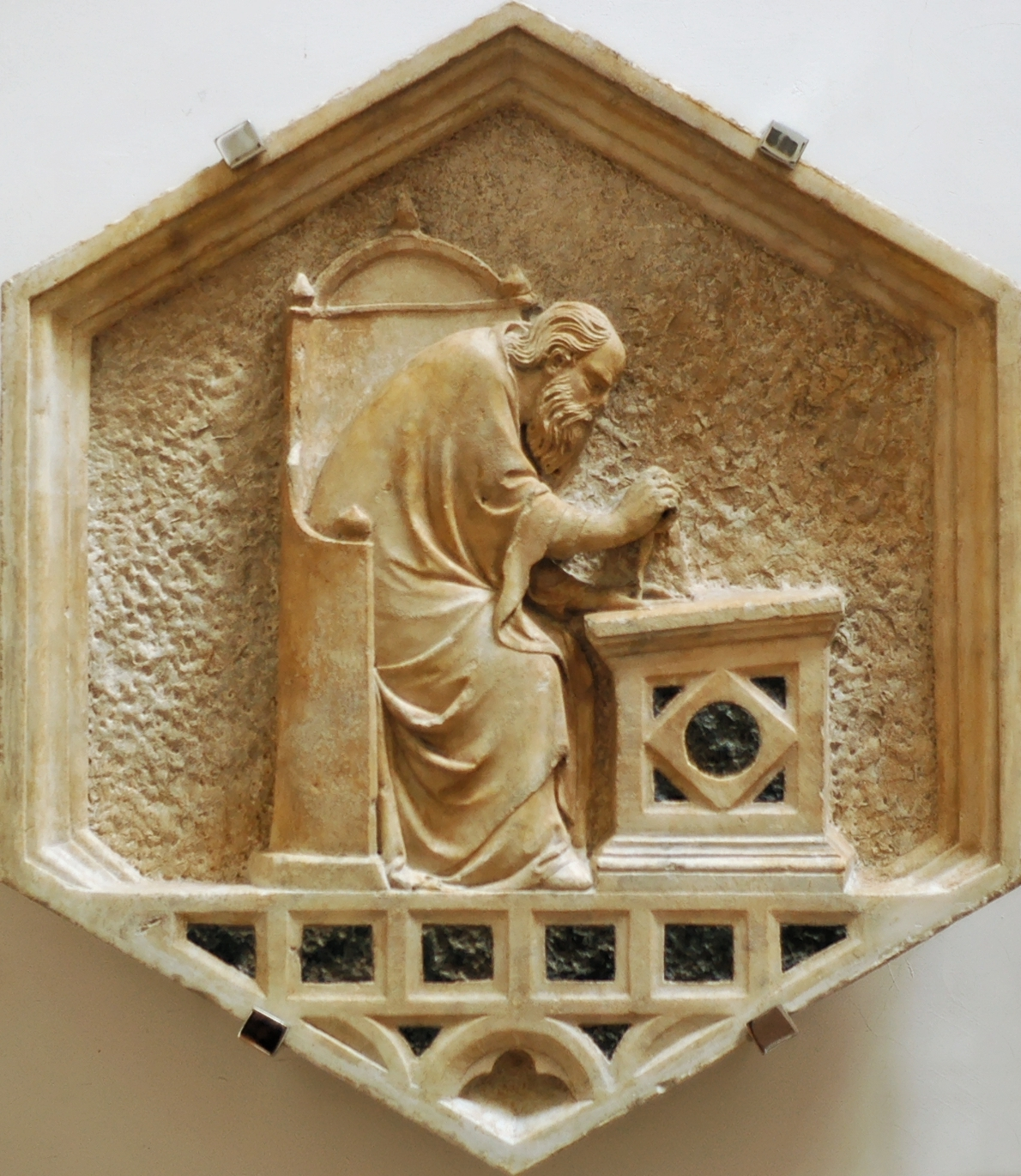
"Euclid", panel from Giotto's Bell Tower, now in the Museo dell'Opera del Duomo, Florence

Nino Pisano (fl. 1349 – 1368) was an Italian sculptor, the son of Andrea Pisano.

He collaborated with his father in sculptures for the churches of San Zanipolo at Venice and in Santa Caterina at Pisa, and provided some panels for the bell tower of Santa Maria del Fiore. Nino succeeded his father in the works of the Orvieto Cathedral in 1349.

Works he made alone include a Madonna with Child in Santa Maria Novella, Florence, a Saint Bishop in the Cathedral of Oristano and a Monument to Bishop Scherlatti now in the Museum of Pisa Cathedral. His other attributed works include a Madonna of the Rose in Santa Maria della Spina, a Madonna with Child in Basilica of Maria S.S. Annunciata in Trapani and a Madonna del Latte in the Museum of St. Matthew, both in Pisa. An Annunciation, once in Santa Caterina, is now in the National Gallery of Art in Washington, D.C.

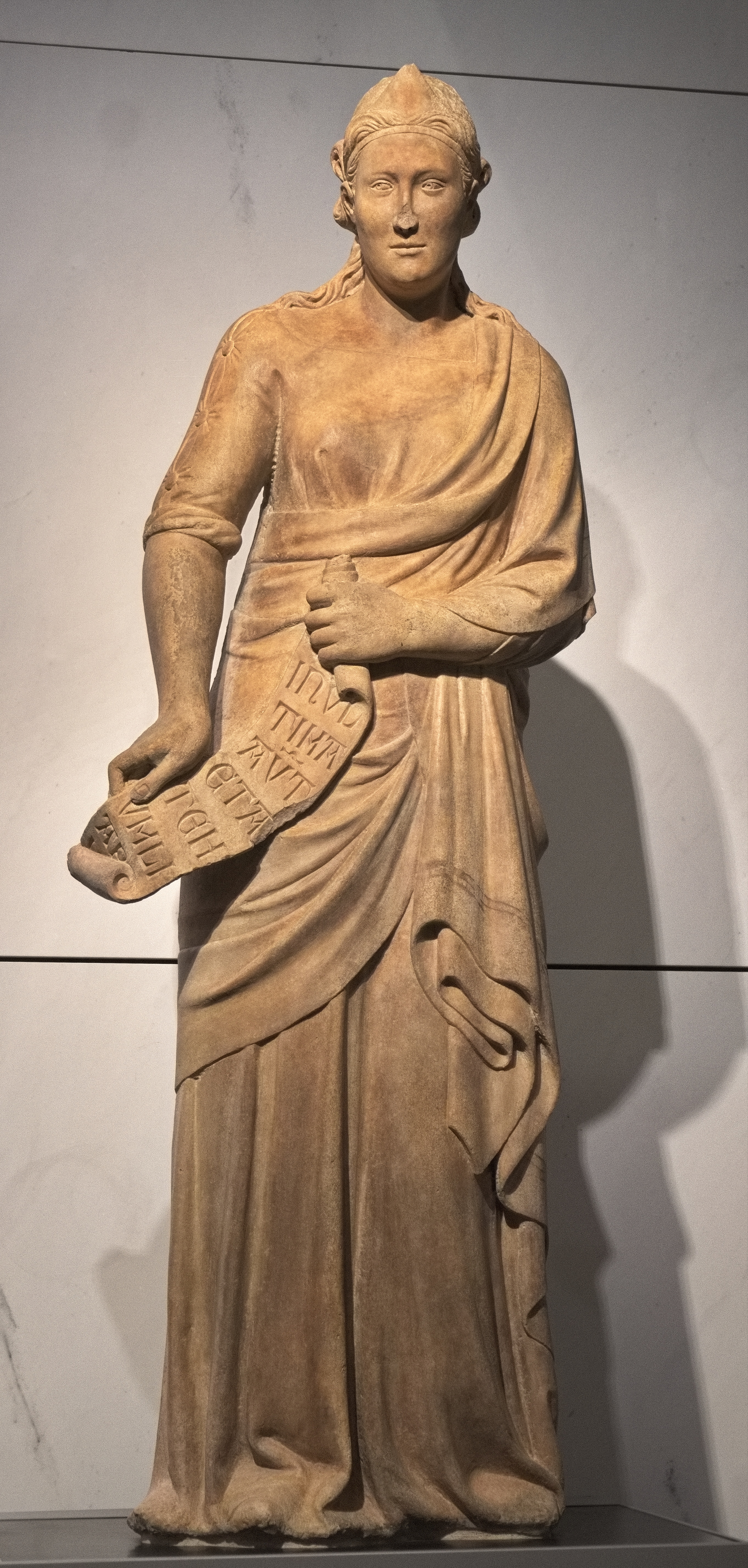
Sibilla Eritrea (1337–41), Museo dell'Opera del Duomo, Florence

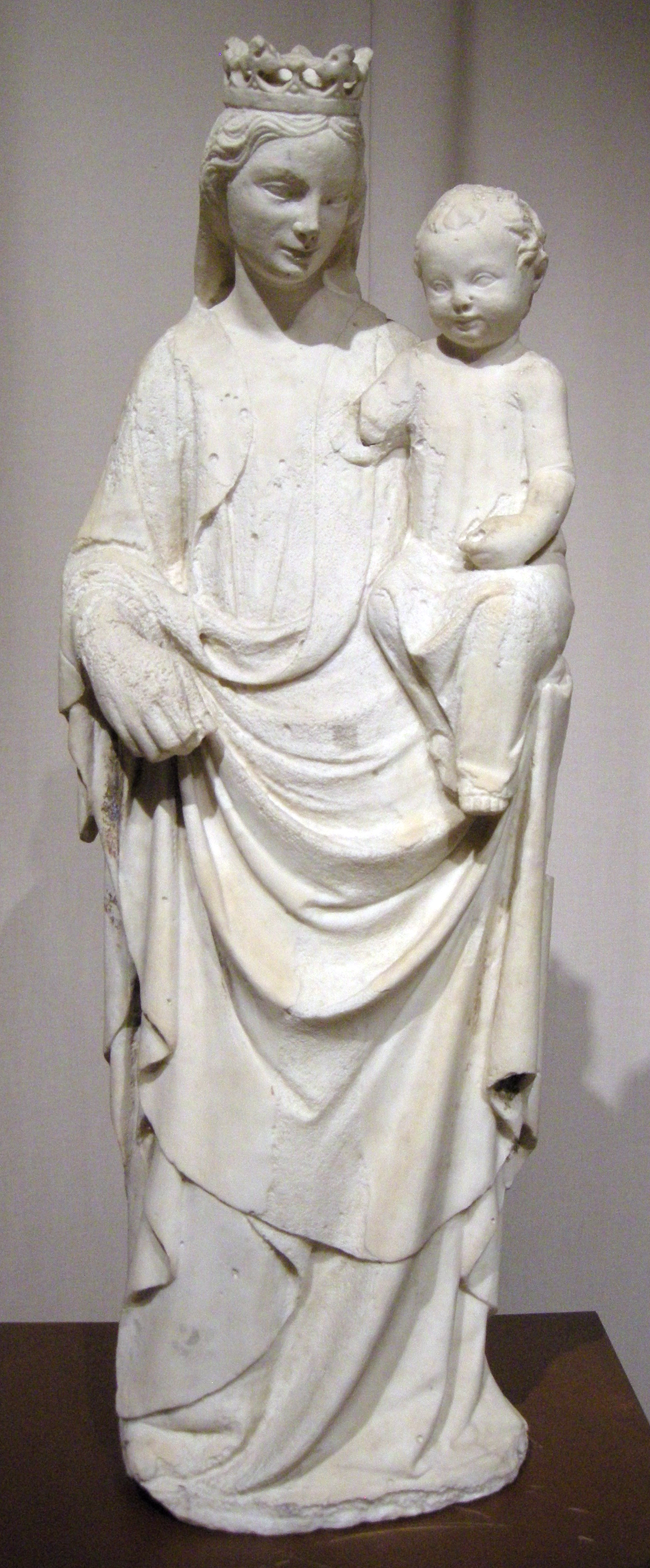
Madonna and Child with two Angels (c. 1360–70) from the west facade of Santa Maria della Spina in the Museo di San Matteo
