= Santa Chiara, Pisa =

Church in Pisa, Italy

Coordinates: 43°43′17.99″N 10°23′43.42″E

Santa Chiara
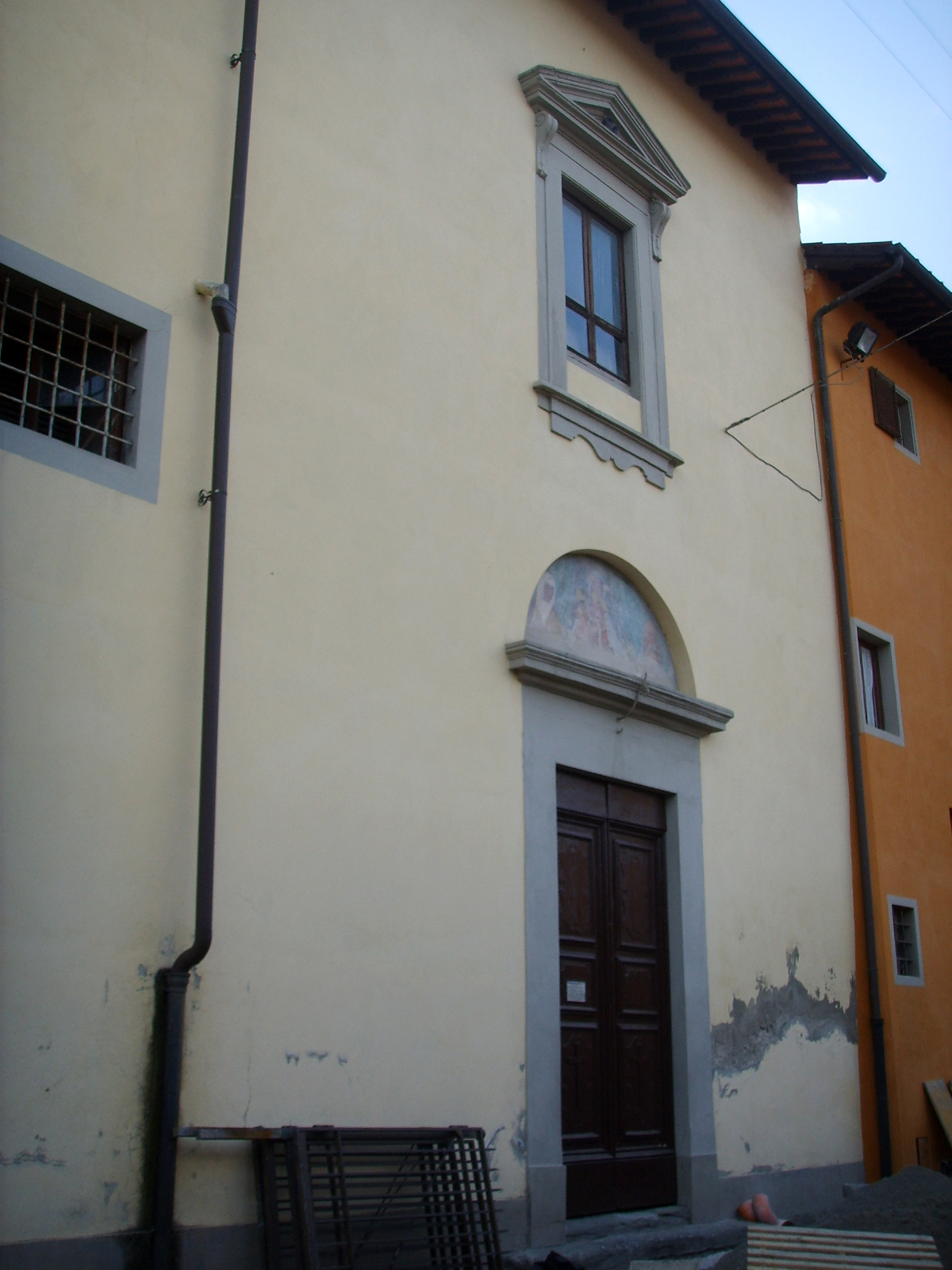
- Façade.

- Location within Italy

Religion
- Affiliation: Roman Catholic
- Province: Pisa

Location
- Location: Pisa, Italy

Architecture
- Type: Church
- Groundbreaking: 1227

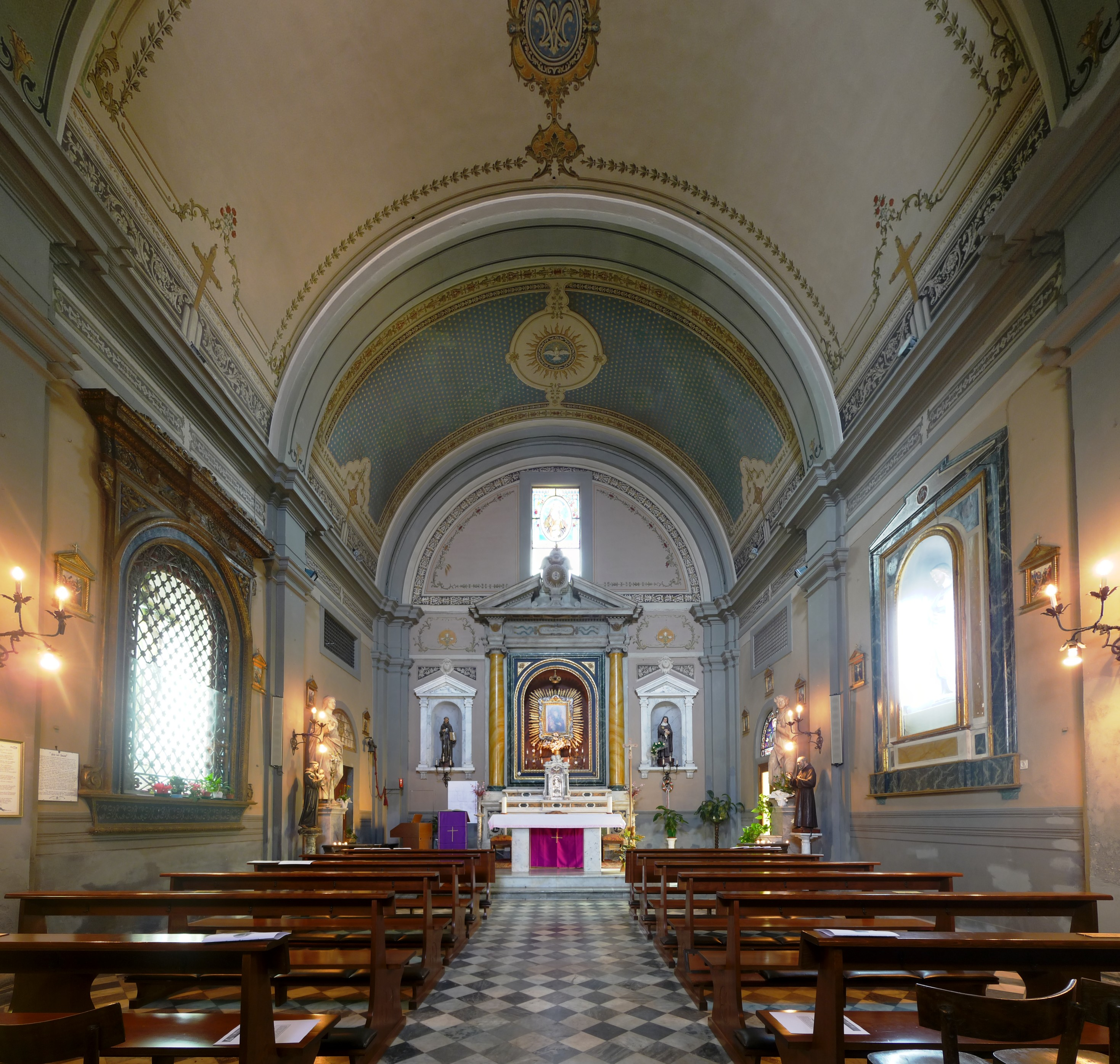
Interior

Santa Chiara is a Roman Catholic church in Pisa, region of Tuscany, Italy, a few paces away from the Piazza dei Miracoli.

== History ==
Originally called the church of Santo Spirito, it was reconstructed in 1227 as the chapel for the adjacent hospital of Santa Chiara (St Clare), later called Spedale Nuovo di Santo Spirito.

The portal fresco of Madonna and child with Saints Clare and Francis dates to the 17th century. One of the relics contained in this church is a supposed spine from the Crown of thorns worn by Christ at the passion, and once held at the church of Santa Maria della Spina. It also contains a 15th-16th century wooden Crucifix and a marble Annunciation (1567) by Stoldo Lorenzi.
