= List of patron saints by occupation and activity =

This is a list of patron saints of occupations and activities, it also encompasses groups of people with a common occupation or activity.

== A ==
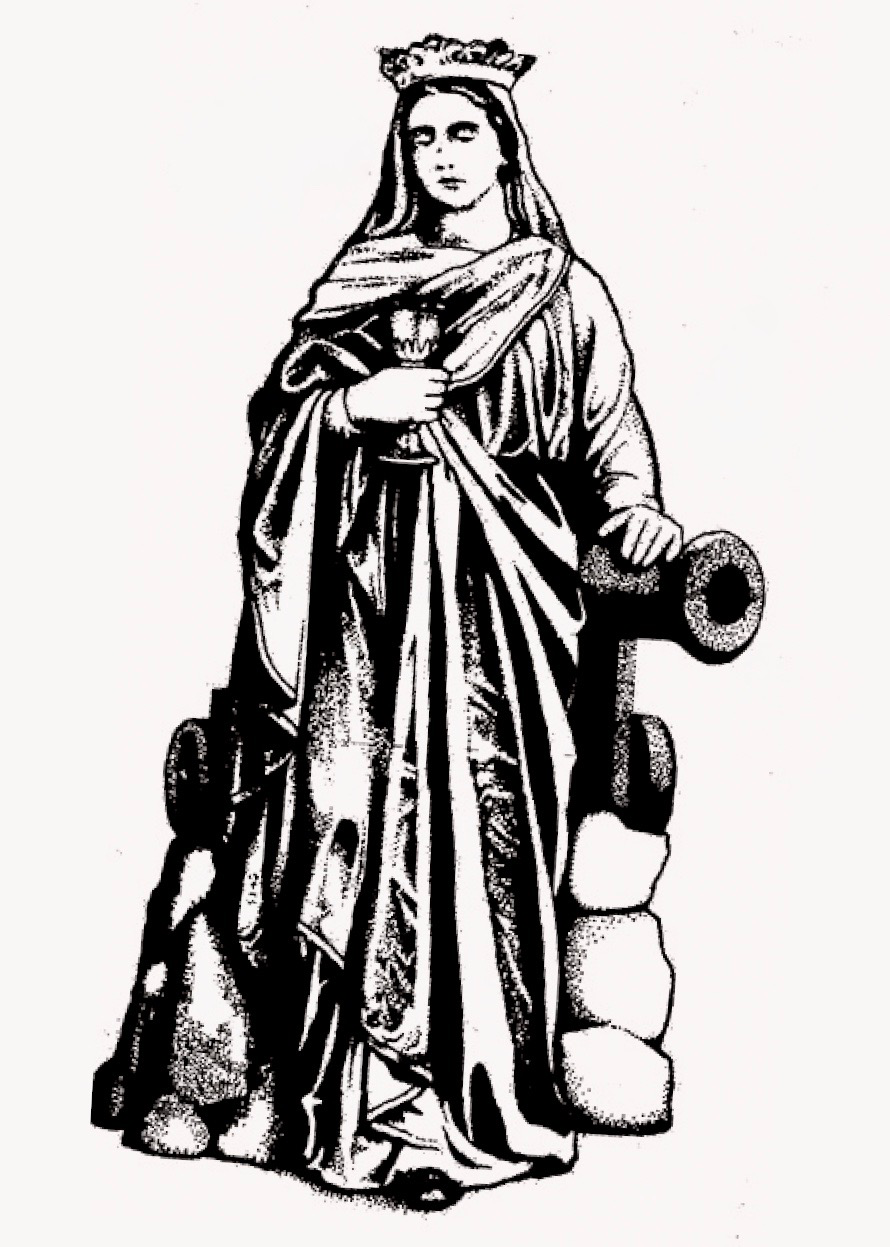
Saint Barbara, patron saint of artillerymen, with a cannon

- Academics - Thomas Aquinas, Albert the Great
- Actors - Genesius
  - Comic actors - Maturinus
- Accountants - Matthew
- Advertisers - Bernardino of Siena
- Air travellers - Joseph of Cupertino
- Altar servers - John Berchmans, Tarcisius, Lorenzo Ruiz, Pedro Calungsod
- Ambassadors - Gabriel the Archangel
- Anesthesiologists - René Goupil
- Apprentices - John Bosco
- Archeologists - Helen of Constantinople
- Archers - George, Nicholas of Myra, Ursula
- Archivists - Lawrence, Catherine of Alexandria
- Architects - Benedict of Nursia, Bernward of Hildesheim, Thomas the Apostle
- Armourers - George
- Arms dealers - Adrian of Nicomedia
- Art dealers - John the Evangelist
- Artillerymen - Barbara
- Artists - Luke the Evangelist, Philip Neri, Eligius
- Astronauts - Joseph of Cupertino
- Astronomers - Dominic
- Athletes - Sebastian, Christopher, St Hyacinth
- Attorneys - Genesius
- Authors - Francis de Sales, John the Evangelist, Lucy
- Aviators - Joseph of Cupertino, Our Lady of Loreto, Thérèse of Lisieux (The Little Flower)

== B ==
- Bakers - Agatha of Sicily, Elizabeth of Hungary, Honorius of Amiens
  - Bakers of altar bread - Honorius of Amiens
- Bankers - Bernardine of Feltre, Matthew, Michael the Archangel
- Barbers - Cosmas, Damian
- Barristers - Genesius
- Bartenders - Amand
- Basket makers - Anthony the Abbot,
- Beekeepers - Ambrose of Milan, Bernard of Clairvaux, Valentine
- Beggars - Ambrose of Milan, Elisabeth of Hungary, Giles, Peter of Saint Joseph de Betancur
- Bell makers - Agatha of Sicily
- Belt makers - Alexius of Rome
- Bird dealers - John the Baptist
- Blacksmiths - Dunstan, Peter the Apostle
- Boatmen - Julian the Hospitaller
- Bookbinders - Christopher, Pope Celestine V
- Bookkeepers - Matthew
- Booksellers - John of God
- Bombardiers - Quentin
- Box makers - Fiacre
- Boy Scouts - George
- Brewers - Amand, Arnold of Soissons, Dorothea of Caesarea, Nicholas of Myra
- Bridge builders - Bénézet, Peter the Apostle
- Bricklayers - Stephen
- Broadcasters - Gabriel the Archangel
- Brush makers - Anthony the Great
- Builders - Barbara, Vincent Ferrer
- Businessmen - Homobonus
- Butchers - Adrian of Nicomedia, Andrew the Apostle, Anthony the Abbot, George, Peter the Apostle

== C ==
- Cabinet makers - Andrew the Apostle, Joseph
- Canon lawyers - Raymond of Penyafort
- Carpenters - Joseph, Matthias, Peter the Apostle
- Casket makers - Stephen
- Cattlemen - Andrew the Apostle
- Catechists - Charles Borromeo, Robert Bellarmine
- Catholic students - Aloysius Gonzaga
- Cavalry - George
- Chandlers - Ambrose of Milan, Bernard of Clairvaux
- Chaplains - Quentin
- Charcoal burners - Alexander of Comana, Theobald of Provins
- Chefs - Francis Caracciolo, Lawrence
  - Pastry chefs - Honorius of Amiens, Philip
- Chemists - Albert the Great
- Chess players - Teresa of Ávila
- Children - Nicholas of Myra
- Chimney sweeps - Erasmus of Formiae, Florian
- Cinema - Genesius
- Civil engineers - Dominic de la Calzada
- Civil servants - Thomas More
- Clergy of Korea - Andrew Kim
- Clerics - Gabriel of Our Lady of Sorrows
- Clock makers - Peter the Apostle
- Clothworkers - Homobonus, Peter the Apostle
- Clowns - Genesius, Maturinus
- Cobblers - Crispin
- Coffee house owners - Drogo of Sebourg
- Comedians - Genesius, Lawrence, Philip Neri, Vitus
- College students - Isabel Cristina
- Communications workers - Gabriel the Archangel
- Computer programmers - Isidore of Seville
- Computer scientists - Isidore of Seville
- Computer technicians - Isidore of Seville
- Computer users - Isidore of Seville
- Confectioners - Honorius of Amiens
- Cooks - Lawrence, Martha
- Coopers - Urban of Langres
- Couriers - Bona of Pisa
- Court clerks - Thomas More
- Craftsmen - Joseph, Macarius of Unzha, Eligius
- Cream clotters - Piran
- Curriers - Bartholomew the Apostle, Crispin
- Customs agents - Matthew
- Cutlers - Lucy
- Cyclists - Sebastian

== D ==
- Dairy workers - Brigid of Ireland
- Dancers - Vitus
- Deacons - Stephen, Marinus
- Dentists - Antipas, Apollonia, Foillan
- Dietitians - Martha
- Diplomats - Gabriel the Archangel
- Doctors - Cosmas, Damian, Luke the Evangelist, Pantaleon, Raphael the Archangel, Gianna Beretta Molla
- Domestic servants - Zita
- Drapers - Severus of Avranches
- Drivers - Christopher, Fiacre, Frances of Rome
- Dyers - Maurice and Lydia

== E ==
- Ecologists - Francis of Assisi, Kateri, Hildegard of Bingen
- Editors - John Bosco, John the Evangelist
- Educators - Ignatius of Loyola, John Baptist de la Salle, Marcellin Champagnat, Scholastica
- Electricians – Virgin of Candelaria
- Embroiderers - Clare of Assisi, Rose of Lima
- Emergency dispatchers - Gabriel the Archangel
- Encyclopedists - Jerome
- Engineers - Benedict of Nursia, Ferdinand III, Patrick
  - Military engineers - Barbara, Eligius
- English writers - Bede
- Environmentalists - Kateri
- Equestrians - Andrew the Apostle, George, James (son of Zebedee)
- Exorcists - Anastasia of Sirmium

== F ==
- Farmers - Benedict of Nursia, Bernard of Vienne, Botolph, Isidore the Farmer, Notburga, Phocas the Gardener, Theobald of Provins, Walstan
- Farm workers - Andrew the Apostle, Benedict of Nursia, Bernard of Vienne, Eligius, George, Isidore the Farmer, Notburga, Phocas the Gardener, Walstan
- Farriers - Eligius, John the Baptist
- Field workers - Medard
- Firefighters - Eustace, Florian
  - Brazilian firefighters - George
  - Military firefighters - Barbara
- Fireworks makers - Barbara
- Fishermen - Andrew the Apostle, Benno, Our Lady of Salambao, Peter the Apostle, Zeno of Verona
- Fishmongers - Andrew the Apostle, Magnus of Avignon, Peter the Apostle
- Flight attendants - Bona of Pisa
- Florists - Dorothea of Caesarea, Fiacre, Honorius of Amiens, Thérèse of Lisieux (The Little Flower)
- Flour merchants - Honorius of Amiens
- Foresters - John Gualbert
- Foundry workers - Barbara
- Fullers - Anastasius the Fuller
- Funeral directors - Joseph of Arimathea
- Furriers - Hubert of Liège, James (son of Zebedee)

== G ==
- Gamblers - Cajetan
- Gamers / Gaming - Carlo Acutis
- Gardeners - Ansovinus, Christopher, Fiacre, Gertrude of Nivelles, Phocas the Gardener, Rose of Lima, Urban of Langres
- Geoscientists - Barbara
- Glass makers - Peter the Apostle
- Glaziers - Lucy
- Gilders - Clare of Assisi
- Goldsmiths - Clare of Assisi, Dunstan, Eligius
- Grave diggers - Anthony the Abbot, Roch
- Grocers - Michael the Archangel
- Guards - Adrian of Nicomedia, Peter of Alcantara
- Guides - Bona of Pisa

== H ==
- Hairdressers - Mary Magdalene
- Harness makers - Eligius
- Harvesters - Peter the Apostle
- Hat makers - Severus of Avranches
- Healers - Anastasia of Sirmium, Brigid of Ireland
- Heralds - Benedict of Nursia
- Herbalists - Fiacre
- Historians - Bede, Isidore of Seville
- The homeless - Peter of Saint Joseph de Betancur, Thérèse of Lisieux
- Homemakers - Andrew the Apostle
- Horsemen - George
- Horticulture - Dorothea of Caesarea, Fiacre
- Hosiers - Fiacre
- Hospital administrators - Basil the Great, Frances Xavier Cabrini
- Hospital public relations - Paul the Apostle
- Hospital workers - Camillus of Lellis, John of God, Jude
- Husbandry - Benedict of Nursia, Bernard of Vienne, Eligius, George, Isidore the Farmer, Phocas the Gardener, Walstan
- Hunters - Eustace, Hubert of Liège

== I ==
- Ice skaters - Lidwina
- Immigrants - Frances Xavier Cabrini
- Infantrymen - Maurice
- Innkeepers - Amand

== J ==
- Janitors - Zita
- Jesters - Maturinus
- Jesuit scholastics - Aloysius Gonzaga
- Jewelers - Eligius
- Jewish Converts - Edith Stein
- Job seekers - Cajetan
- Joiners - Matthew
- Journalists - Francis de Sales
- Jurors - Catherine of Siena
- Jurists - John of Capistrano

== K ==
- Kings - Edward the Confessor
- Knights - George
- Knights Hospitaller - John the Almoner, John the Baptist

== L ==
- Laborers - Joseph, Lucy
- Lace workers - Teresa of Ávila
- Land surveyors - Thomas the Apostle
- Laundry workers - Clare of Assisi, Hunna, Veronica
- Lawyers - Genesius, Thomas More, Yves
- Leatherworkers - Bartholomew the Apostle, Crispin
- Librarians - Catherine of Alexandria, Jerome, Lawrence
- Lighthouse keepers - Verena
- Linguists - Gottschalk
- Locksmiths - Dunstan, Quentin
- Lost things - Saint Anthony of Padua, Saint Phanourios
- Lumberjacks - Gummarus

== M ==
- Marble workers - Clement
- Marines
  - Italian marines - Barbara
- Manual laborers - Isidore the Farmer
- Makers of images of the crucifix - John of Damascus
- Mariners - Brendan the Navigator, Christopher, Clement, Nicholas of Tolentine
- Martyrs - Anastasia of Sirmium, Lucy
- Matchmakers - Raphael the Archangel
- Mathematicians - Barbara, Hubert of Liège
- Mechanics - Catherine of Alexandria, Eligius
- Medical record librarians - Raymond of Penyafort
- Medical social workers - John Regis
- Medical technicians - Albertus Magnus
- Mental health professionals - Dymphna
- Merchants - Amand, Francis of Assisi, Macarius of Unzha, Nicholas of Myra
- Messengers - Gabriel the Archangel
- Metal workers - Eligius
- Meteorologists - Medard
- Midwives - Pantaleon, Raymond Nonnatus, Olga Michael
- Millers - Arnulph, Christina the Astonishing, Leodegar, Winnoc
- Miners - Barbara
- Missionaries - Francis Xavier, Mother Teresa of Calcutta, Thérèse of Lisieux (The Little Flower )
- Motorcyclists - Columbanus
- Motorists - Anthony the Abbot
- Mountaineers - Bernard of Menthon
- Musicians - Cecilia, Dunstan, Hildegard of Bingen

== N ==
- Natural scientists - Albertus Magnus
- Navigators - Brendan the Navigator
- Nomadic travelers - Anthony of Padua
- Numismatists - Eligius
- Notaries - Luke the Evangelist
- Nuns - Brigid of Ireland
  - Benedictine nuns - Scholastica
- Nurses - Agatha of Sicily, Alexius of Rome, Camillus of Lellis, Catherine of Alexandria, John of God, Margaret of Antioch, Raphael the Archangel
  - Children's nurses - Foillan
  - Nursing services - Elisabeth of Hungary
  - Italian nurses - Catherine of Siena
- Nurse anesthetists - René Goupil
- Nursing mothers - Basilissa

== O ==
- Obstetricians - Raymond Nonnatus
- Officers at arms - Benedict of Nursia
- Oil refiners - Honorius of Amiens
- Orphans - Gerolamo Emiliani, Thérèse of Lisieux, Ursula
- Overseas workers - Lorenzo Ruiz

== P ==
- Painters - Luke the Evangelist
- Papal delegates - Pope John XXIII
- Paramedics - Michael the Archangel
- Paralegals - Patrick
- Paratroopers - Michael the Archangel
- Parish clerks - Cassian of Imola
- Pasty crimpers - Piran
- Pawnbrokers - Bernardine of Feltre, Nicholas of Myra
- Peasants - Lucy
- Perfumers - Matthew
- Pewterers - Fiacre
- Pharmacists - Cosmas, Damian, Gemma Galgani, James (son of Alphaeus), James (son of Zebedee), Mary Magdalene, Raphael the Archangel
- Philosophers - Augustine of Hippo, Albertus Magnus, Boethius, Catherine of Alexandria
- Photographers - Veronica
- Physicists - Albertus Magnus
- Pig keepers - Anthony the Abbot, Malo
- Pilgrims - Bona of Pisa, James (son of Zebedee)
- Pilots - Christopher
- Plasterers - Bartholomew the Apostle
- Plowboys - Fiacre
- Plumbers - Maturinus
- Poets - John Henry Newman
- Police dispatchers - Gabriel the Archangel
- Police officers - Jude, Michael the Archangel
  - Brazilian police officers - George
- Politicians - Thomas the Apostle, Thomas More, Marinus
- Polytechnic engineering - Ferdinand III of Castile
- Poor students - Joseph of Cupertino
- Popes - Peter the Apostle
- Porters - Quentin
- Postal workers - Gabriel the Archangel
- Potters - Justa and Rufina, Peter the Apostle
- Preachers - Catherine of Alexandria
- Pregnant women - Gerard Majella
- Priests - John Vianney
  - Diocesan priests - Thomas Becket
- Princes - Gottschalk
- Printers - Augustine of Hippo, John Bosco
- Prison officers
  - Italian prison officers - Basilides
- Psychiatrists - Christina the Astonishing, Dymphna
- Publishers - John Bosco
- Pyrotechnicians - Erasmus of Formiae

== Q ==
- Queens - Jadwiga of Poland

== R ==
- Radio workers - Gabriel the Archangel
- Radiologists - Gabriel the Archangel
- Royal Electrical Mechanical Engineers soldiers - Eligius

== S ==
- Saddle makers - Crispin, George
- Saddlers - Lucy
- Sailors - Botolph, Brendan the Navigator, Elizabeth Seton, Erasmus of Formiae, Nicholas of Myra, Peter the Apostle, Phocas the Gardener
  - Sailors in Brittany - Maturinus
  - French Canadian voyagers and sailors - Andrew the Apostle
- Salespeople - Lucy
- Scholars - Brigid of Ireland
- School children - Isidore of Seville, Madeleine Sophie Barat
- School teachers - Cassian of Imola
- Scientists - Albertus Magnus, Dominic
- Scribes - Catherine of Alexandria
- Sculptors - Claude
- Seafarers - Brendan the Navigator
- Second hand dealers - Roch
- Secretaries - Catherine of Alexandria, Claude
- Security guards - Matthew, Michael the Archangel
- Seminarians - Charles Borromeo, Gabriel of Our Lady of Sorrows
- Service men of the Russian Strategic Rocket Forces - Barbara
- Servers of the sick - Saint Peter of Saint Joseph de Betancur
- Shepherds - Bernadette of Lourdes, Cuthbert, Cuthman, Dominic of Silos, Drogo of Sebourg, George, Germaine Cousin, Julian the Hospitaller, Raphael the Archangel, Regina, Solange
- Shoemakers - Crispin, Gangulphus, Peter the Apostle, Theobald of Provins
- Shorthand writers - Cassian of Imola
- Skiers - Bernard of Menthon
- Silk makers - Severus of Avranches
- Software engineers - Carlo Acutis, Isidore of Seville
- Soldiers - Adrian of Nicomedia, George, Ignatius of Loyola, Joan of Arc, Martin of Tours, Michael the Archangel, Sebastian, Theodore, Heahmund
- Special forces - Philip Neri
- Spectacle makers - Jerome
- Speleologists
  - Italian speleologists - Benedict of Nursia
- Spiritual directors - Ephrem the Syrian
- Spiritual retreats - Ignatius of Loyola
- Spur makers - Giles
- Stablemen - Andrew the Apostle
- Stained glass workers - Lucy
- Statesmen - Thomas More
- Steeplejacks - Erasmus of Formiae
- Stenographers - Cassian of Imola, Catherine of Alexandria
- Stonecutters - Clement
- Stonemasons - Barbara, Blaise, Reinold, Marinus
- Students - Albertus Magnus, Benedict of Nursia, Catherine of Alexandria, Gabriel of Our Lady of Sorrows, Gemma Galgani, Isidore of Seville, Lawrence, Tatiana of Rome, Thomas Aquinas, Ursula, Wolbodo, St Alfred the Great
  - Students in various European cities - Nicholas of Myra
- Surfers - Christopher
- Surgeons - Cosmas, Damian, Foillan, Luke the Evangelist, Quentin, Roch

== T ==
- Tailors - Homobonus, Matthias, Quentin
- Tanners - Bartholomew the Apostle, Catherine of Alexandria, Clement, Crispin, Gangulphus, James (son of Zebedee), John the Apostle, John the Evangelist, Lawrence, Mary Magdalene, Simon
- Tax collectors - Matthew
- Teachers - Andrew the Apostle, Gregory the Great, Marcellin Champagnat, Thomas Aquinas
  - Christian teachers - John Baptist de la Salle
- Television workers - Gabriel the Archangel
- Test takers - Joseph of Cupertino
- Teutonic Knights - George
- Tin miners - Piran
- Tinsmiths - Joseph of Arimathea, Piran
  - Tinsmiths in Paris - Maturinus
- Theater performers - Clare of Assisi, Genesius
- Thieves who repent - Nicholas of Myra
- Theologians - Augustine of Hippo, John the Evangelist
- Therapists - Dymphna
- Thomasites - Kateri
- Those seeking lost items or people - Anthony of Padua
- Those who work at great heights - Erasmus of Formiae
- Tile makers - Fiacre, Roch
- Town criers - Blaise
- Toymakers - Claude La Colombière, Nicholas of Myra
- Translators - Jerome, Gottschalk
- Trappers - Bartholomew the Apostle, Eustachius
- Travellers - Bona of Pisa, Botolph, Christopher, James (son of Zebedee), Joseph, Macarius of Unzha, Raphael the Archangel
- Truss makers - Foillan

== U ==
- Undertakers - Dismas
- Unemployed - Cajetan

== V ==
- Veterinarians - Blaise, Eligius, James the Great
- Vinegar makers - Vincent of Saragossa
- Vine dressers - Urban of Langres
- Vine growers - Amand, Urban of Langres
- Vintners - Amand, Urban of Langres
- Volunteers - Vincent de Paul

== W ==
- Waiters - Zita
- Washer women - Hunna
- Wax melters and refiners - Ambrose of Milan, Bernard of Clairvaux
- Weavers - Anastasia of Sirmium, Anthony Mary Claret
- Wheelwrights - Catherine of Alexandria
- Wine growers - Theobald of Provins
- Wine makers - Vincent of Saragossa
- Working people - Joseph
- Women seeking a husband - Anthony of Padua
- Wood carvers - Wolfgang of Regensburg
- Wood workers - Wolfgang of Regensburg
- Wool combers and weavers - Blaise
- Wool makers - Severus of Avranches
- Writers - Francis de Sales, Philip Neri, Teresa of Ávila, Hildegard of Bingen, Lucy

== Z ==
- Zoology - Albertus Magnus, Francis of Assisi
- Zookeepers - St. Paul

== See also ==
- Patron saints of ailments, illness, and dangers
- Patron saints of places
- Patronage of the Blessed Virgin Mary
- Saint symbolism
