= Saint symbolism: Saints (Q–Z) =

Attribute identifying a saint in artworks

Saint symbolism has been used from the very beginnings of the religion. Each saint is said to have led an exemplary life and symbols have been used to tell these stories throughout the history of the Church. A number of Christian saints are traditionally represented by a symbol or iconic motif associated with their life, termed an attribute or emblem, to identify them. The study of these forms part of iconography in art history. They were particularly used so that the illiterate could recognize a scene, and to give each of the Saints something of a personality in art. They are often carried in the hand by the Saint.

Attributes often vary with either time or geography, especially between Eastern Christianity and the West. Orthodox images more often contained inscriptions with the names of saints, so the Eastern repertoire of attributes is generally smaller than the Western.^{[c]} Many of the most prominent saints, like Saint Peter and Saint John the Evangelist can also be recognised by a distinctive facial type. Some attributes are general, such as the martyr's palm. The use of a symbol in a work of art depicting a Saint reminds people who is being shown and of their story. The following is a list of some of these attributes.

== Saints listed by name ==
Saints (A–H)

Saints (I–P)

=== Q ===
Q
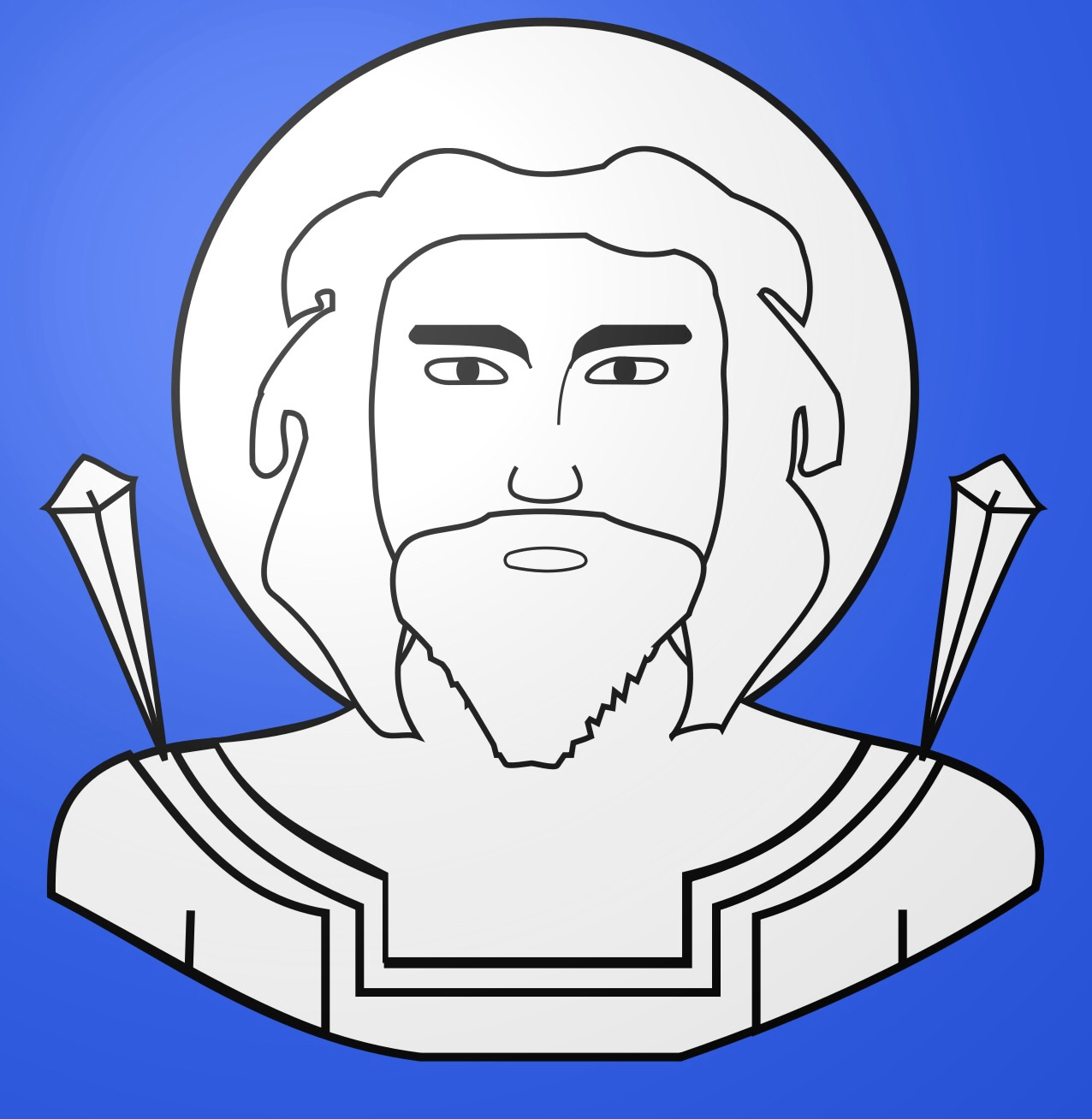
Saint Quentin with two spits

The arms of Roetgen showing the symbol of Quirinus, the patron saint of Rott, who killed a dragon with a crossed-spear

Saint	Symbol
Quentin	two spits; vestments of a deacon; with a broken wheel; with a chair to which he is transfixed; with a sword or beheaded, a dove flying from his severed head^{[a]}
Quiricus	naked child riding on a wild boar^{[a]}
Quirinus of Malmedy	chasuble, dragon
Quirinus of Neuss	military attire; knight with lance, sword, hawk; banner or sign with nine balls^{[a]}
Quirinus of Sescia	millstone hanging from his neck^{[b]}
Quirinus of Tegernsee	orb, scepter
Quiteria	palm of martyrdom, with a dog on a lead, with her head in her hands, emerging from the sea^{[a]}

=== R ===
R
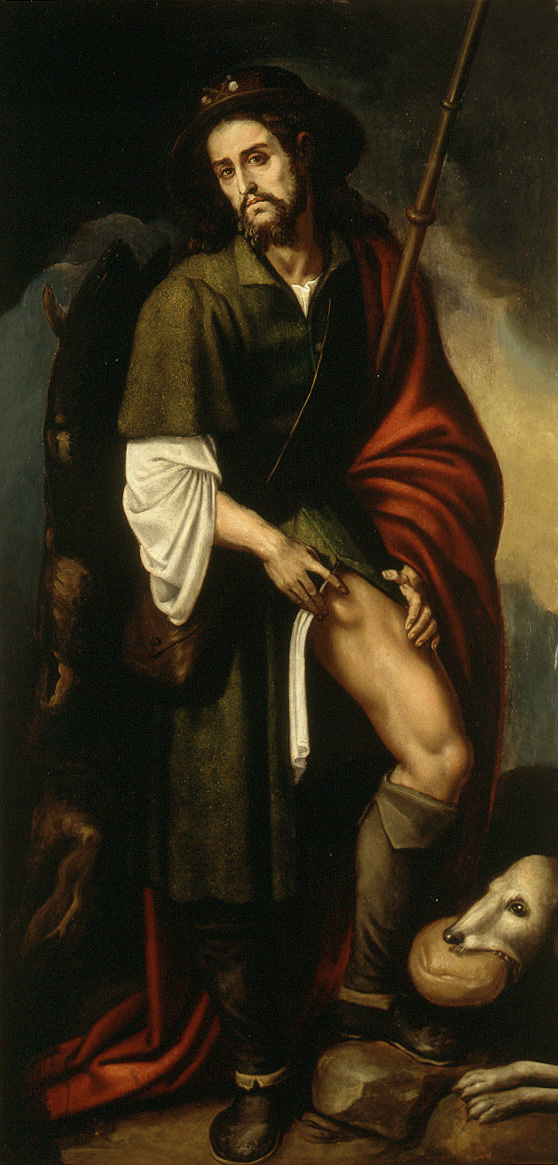
Saint Roch showing his plague mark

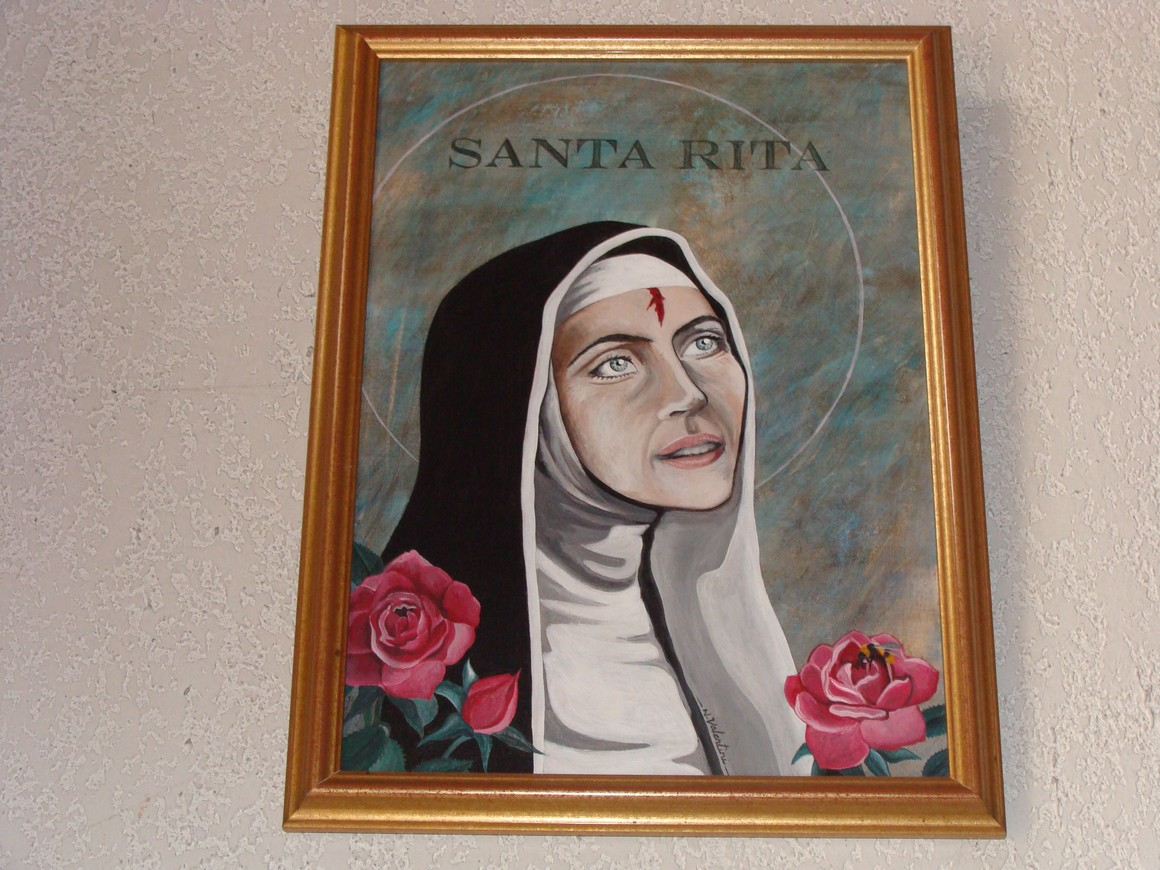
Saint Rita of Cascia with her forehead wound

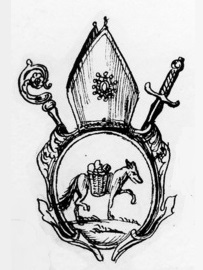
Coat of arms of Stavelot Abbey bearing the wolf that accompanied Saint Remaclus

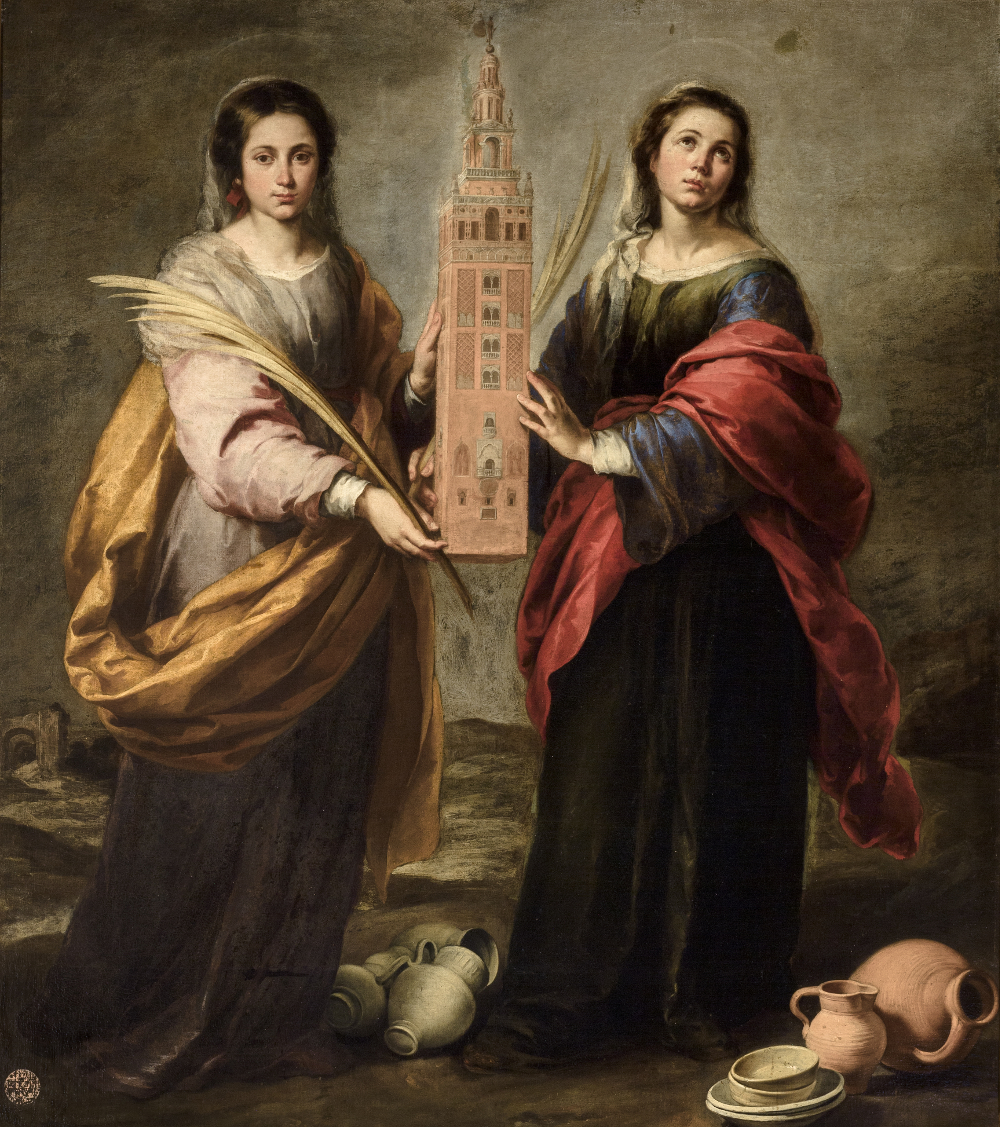
Justa and Rufina

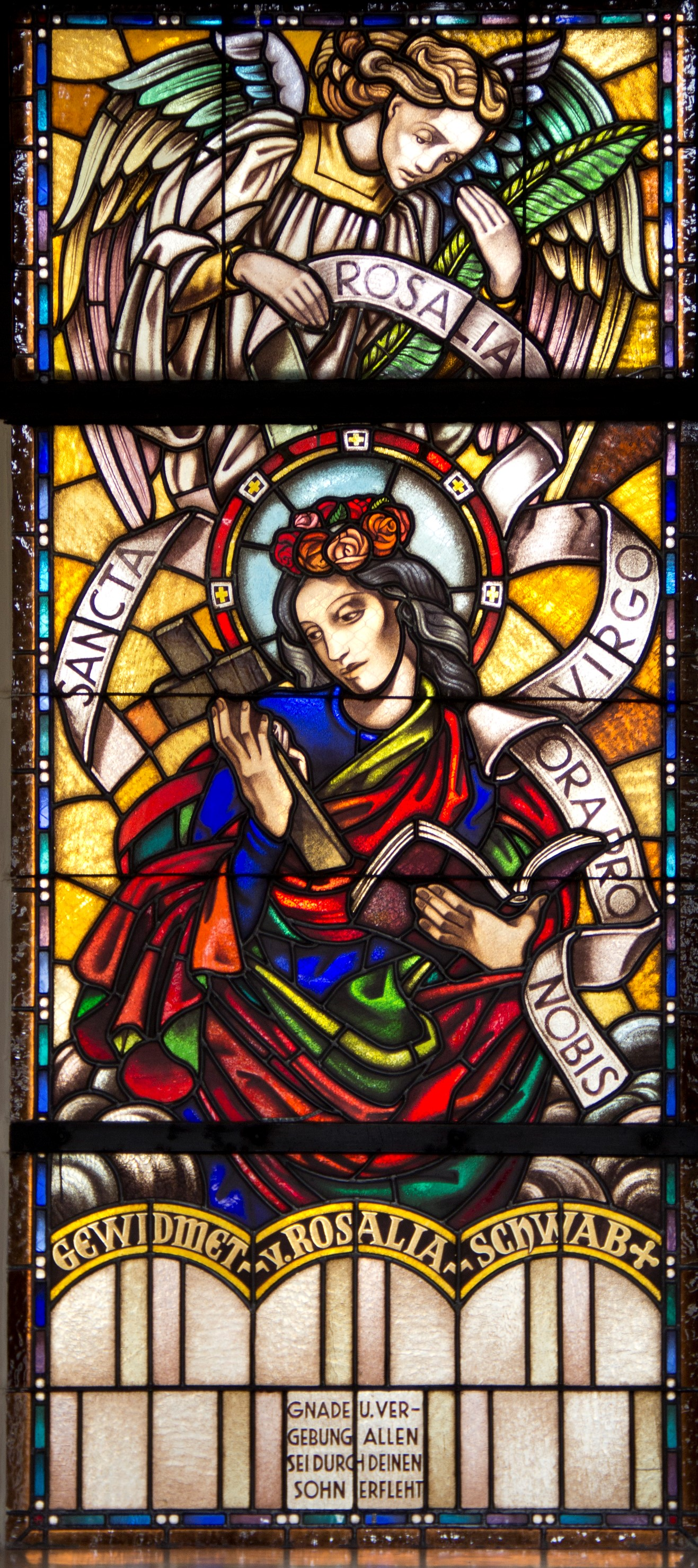
Rosalia

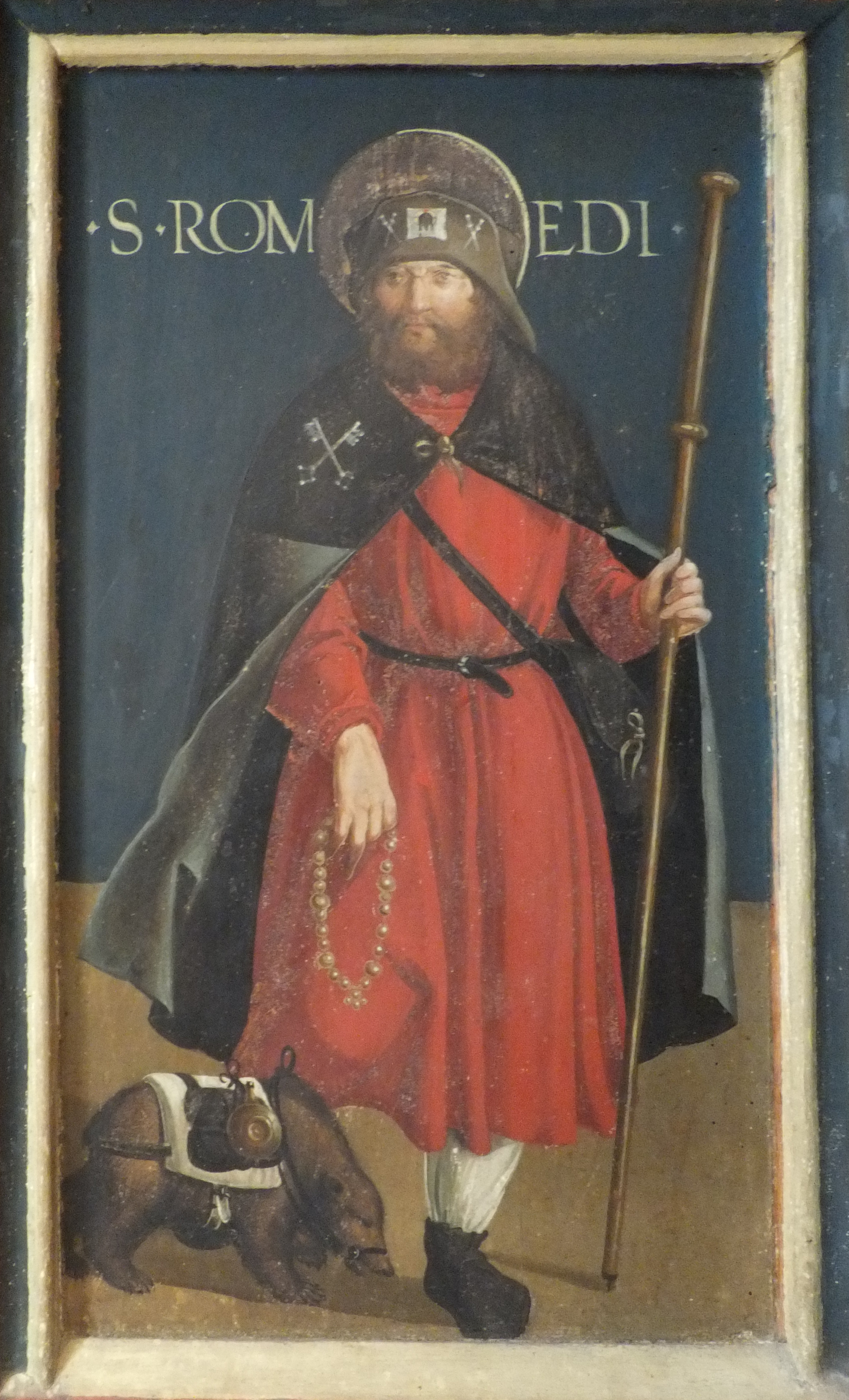
Romedius with a packed bear carrying his luggage

Article title	Attributes
Rachilidis	Habit of a (Benedictine) hermit or anachoress
Radegund	crowned; mantle with fleurs de lys
Rafael Arnaiz Barón	Trappist habit
Rafael Guízar y Valencia	Bishop's attire
Rafaela Porras Ayllón	Religious habit of the Handmaids of the Sacred Heart of Jesus
Randoald of Grandval	Monastic habit of a Benedictine, martyr's palm, spear
Raphael (archangel)	holding a small package; walking with Tobias, carrying a fish; walking staff^{[b]}
Rasso	military attire
Raymond Nonnatus	Mercedarian religious habit, wearing a cardinal's red mozzetta, holding a monstrance and a martyr's palm
Raymond of Capua	Dominican habit, holding the rule of the order
Raymond of Penyafort	skimming across the sea with his cape as both boat and sail
Raynald of Nocera	Bishop's attire over his Benedictine habit
Regina (martyr)	depicted as experiencing the torments of martyrdom, or as receiving spiritual consolation in prison by a vision of a dove on a luminous cross.
Reineldis	Religious habit with the staff and the headgear of a pilgrim, rosary, dragged by her hair in order to be decapitated
Reinold	body armor, holding a shield, beaten to death with hammers
Remaclus	Bishop's attire, accompanied by a wolf
Remigius	dove, book, lamp^{[b]}
Reparata	standing alone or near St. Mary, bearing a martyr's crown and palm; a dove; a banner with a red cross on a white field; sometimes depicted with St. Ansanus
Restituta	pictured with an angel above her
Reverianus	crozier, holding his mitred head in his hands
Richardis	dressed in Imperial robes with crown and palm, and surrounded by flames; as well as a bear
Richard	bishop with overturned chalice^{[a]}
Rictrude	holding a model of a church
Rieul of Senlis	frogs around him
Rita of Cascia	roses, roses and figs, crucifix, thorn, robe of a widow or Augustinian habit sometimes with a wound or the marks of a thorn crown on her forehead^{[a]}
Robert of Newminster	depicted as an abbot holding a church
Roch	Wound on thigh (plague mark), dog offering bread, Pilgrim's hat, Pilgrim's staff, angel^{[a]}
Roger of Cannae	sheltered inder the wings of an eagle
Rolando Rivi	cassock
Romanos the Melodist	deacon's attire, standing on a raised platform in the middle of a church, holding a scroll with his Kontakion of the Nativity written on it. His icon is often a combined with that of The Protection of the Mother of God, which falls on the same day.
Romanus of Rouen	depicted with a Gargouille
Romedius	alongside a packed bear
Romulus of Fiesole	depicted with a wolf due to confusion with the legend of Romulus and Remus; bishop with an arrow broken above his breast; depicted at martyrdom of 4 companions or enthroned among four martyrs
Rosa Maria Benedetta Gattorno Custo	Nun's habit, crucifix, rosary, stigmata
Rosalia	roses, a cross, book, or skull, spray of lilies. Some images show her holding a chisel and hammer with which she carved her own dedication. She is also seen wearing a crown of roses, attended by winged angels, and often with a view through a cave opening of Palermo Harbor., sometimes she is being crowned by the Divine infant^{[b]}
Rose of Lima	crown of thorns, anchor, city, roses, crown of roses, sometimes wearing habit of the Dominican order ^{[a]}, rosids
Rose of Viterbo	crown of roses, holding a crucifix
Róża Czacka	Religious habit
Rudolf Komórek	Cassock
Rufina and Justa	a model of the Giralda; earthenware pots, bowls and platters; books on which are two lumps of potter's clay; martyr's palm; lion^{[b]}, two maidens floating in the Tiber River with weights attached to their necks.
Rumbold of Mechelen	Bishop's attire with a missioner's cross, or with a hoe lying under his feet. He may also be shown murdered near a coffer of money
Rupert of Salzburg	Holding a container of salt; wearing clerical clothes including mitre; holding a crosier

=== S ===
S
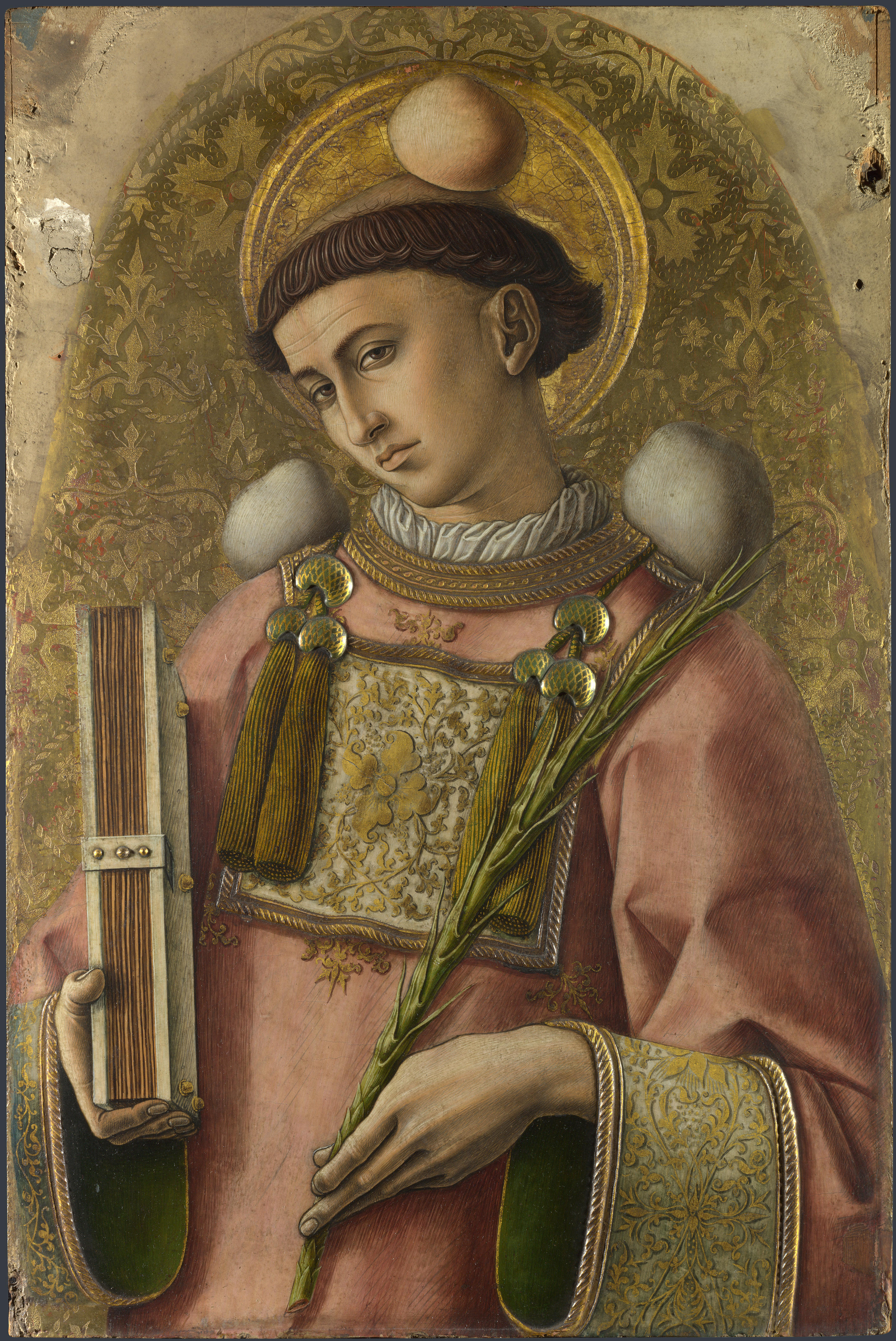
St. Stephen the Martyr depicted in a dalmatic, with three stones and the martyr's palm

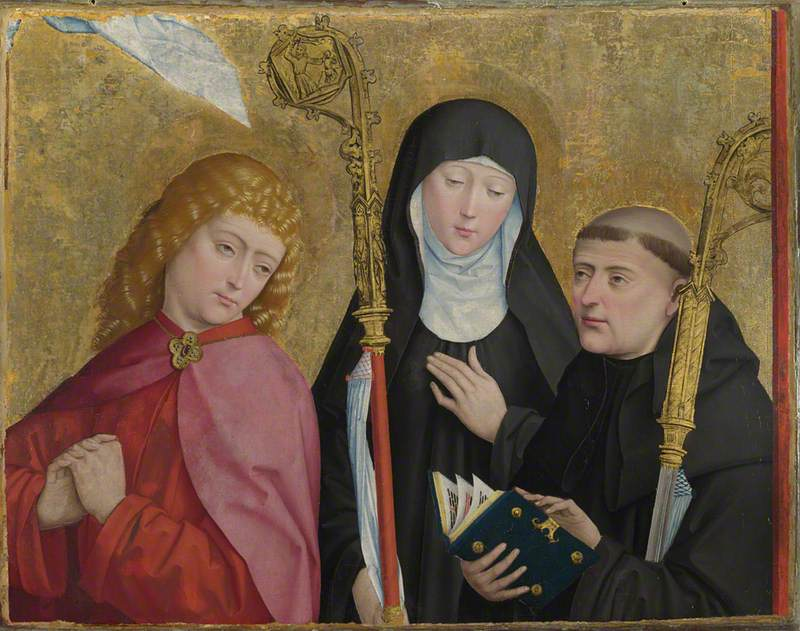
Saints Scholastica, Benedict and John the Evangelist

Article title	Attributes
Sabbas the Sanctified	an apple in his hand
Sabinian of Troyes	With Patroclus of Troyes; man with throat pierced by a sword; with Saint Sabina of Troyes
Salome	vase of ointment
Saturnin	bishop dragged by a bull
Sativola	scythe, well^{[a]}
Sava of Serbia	book^{[a]}
Scholastica	habit of a Benedictine nun, dove, Rule of St. Benedict, crozier of an abbess
Sebaldus	pilgrim with a staff; later represented with the model of a church
Sebastian	Tied to a post, pillar or a tree, shot by arrows, crown^{[a]}
Secundus of Asti	a sword; clouds overhead
Septimius of Iesi	Episcopal attire
Serafino Morazzone	Priest's cassock
Seraphim of Sarov	Wearing peasant clothing, often kneeling with his hands upraised in prayer crucifix worn about his neck, hands crossed over chest^{[a]}
Seraphin of Montegranaro	Franciscan habit
Serapion of Algiers	Palm branch, Mercedarian habit, Crucified in an x-position
Serenidus of Saulges	wearing a cardinal's habit and red galero
Sergius and Bacchus	Roman soldiers bearing palm branches
Sergius of Radonezh	Dressed as a monk, sometimes with paterissa
Servandus and Cermanus	Depicted as young soldiers
Servatius of Tongeren	"Key of Saint Servatius", crozier, dragon (under his feet)
Seventy disciples	Scroll, cross
Severin of Cologne	depicted coming from the cathedral to bless the poor^{[c]}
Severus of Avranches	Bishop with a nearby horse
Severus of Barcelona	bishop with a nail or nails driven into his head
Severus of Ravenna	weaver's loom and tools, a dove
Severus of Vienne	Holding a devil in a chain
Sicarius of Brantôme	Depicted as an infant
Sidonius of Aix	Receiving sight from Jesus
Sidwell	Scythe, and Holy Well
Sigfrid of Sweden	bishop carrying three severed heads; bishop carrying three loaves of bread (misrepresentation of the heads); baptizing King Olof of Sweden; traveling in a ship with 2 other bishops; bishop menaced by devils
Sigolena of Albi	Crosier
Silas	Christian Martyrdom
Silvanus of Ahun	dressed in a dalmatic, bearing a book and a palm.
Simeon	Depicted as an elderly man holding the infant Jesus
Simeon Stylites	Clothed as a monk in monastic habit, shown standing on top of his pillar
Simón de Rojas	Priestly vestments with the Blue and Red cross of the Trinitarian Order
Simon of Cyrene	Carrying Jesus’ Cross before His Crucifixion
Simon of Trent	Youth, martyr's palm
Simon Stock	Carmelite friar holding a scapular
Simon the Apostle	boat; martyr's cross and saw; fish (or two fish); lance; man being sawn in two longitudinally; oar
Simone Ballachi	Dominican habit
Simpliciano of the Nativity	Franciscan habit
Simplicius, Faustinus and Beatrix	Saint Simplicius is represented with a pennant, on the shield of which are three lilies, called the crest of Simplicius; the lilies are a symbol of purity of heart. Saint Beatrix has a cord in her hand, because she was strangled.
Sister Lúcia	Visionary to the Marian apparitions at Fátima
Solange	shepherdess in prayer
Solanus Casey	Franciscan habit
Solutor	Military attire
Sophia of Rome	palm, book, trough, and sword
Sophie-Thérèse de Soubiran La Louvière	Religious habit
Sophronius of Jerusalem	Vested as a bishop, with right hand upheld in blessing, holding a Gospel Book or scroll
Spyridon	Vested as a bishop with omophorion, often holding a Gospel Book, with his right hand raised in blessing. Sometimes the image features a potsherd, or sprig of basil. Iconographically, he is depicted as tall, with a long, white forked beard, and wearing a woven, straw hat on his head – a traditional shepherd's hat and a representation that he was a shepherd of God's people.^{[a]}
Stanislaus of Szczepanów	Bishop's Vestments and insignia, sword^{[a]}
Stanisław Kazimierczyk	Habit of a canon^{[a]}
Stanislaus Kostka	Jesuit habit, an angel giving him Holy Communion
Stanislaus Papczyński	White habit, crucifix, Chaplet of the Ten Virtues of the B.V.M.
Stanislav Nasadil	Martyr's palm
Stanisław Kazimierczyk	Priest's cassock
Stefan Wincenty Frelichowski	Priest's attire, prisoner's uniform
Stefan Wyszyński	Cardinal's attire
Stephen Harding	Dressed in the Cistercian cowl, with miniature church model, holding abbot's crozier, holding the Carta Caritatis ("Charter of Charity"), a founding document for the Cistercian Order
Stephen the Martyr	Red Martyr, stones, dalmatic, censer, miniature church, Gospel Book, martyr's palm.^{[a]}
Stephen of Hungary	Attire of a king, holding an orb or a sceptre with double cross
Stephen Nehmé	Religious habit, prayer rope
Susanna	palm branch, sword
Swithun	Bishop holding a bridge, broken eggs at his feet^{[a]}
Sylvester	often depicted with a dying dragon.
Symeon the Metaphrast	Pen, Scroll, Religious habit
Symphorian and Timotheus	Symphorian is depicted as a young man being dragged to martyrdom while his mother encourages him
Symphorosa	Seven sons, martyr's palm
Syrus of Genoa	A blackbird
Syrus of Pavia	bishop trampling a basilisk (symbol of Arianism) underfoot; bishop enthroned between two deacons; with Saint Juventius
Szilárd Bogdánffy	solideo or bishop's cap and gown, palm
Szymon of Lipnica	Franciscan habit

=== T ===
T
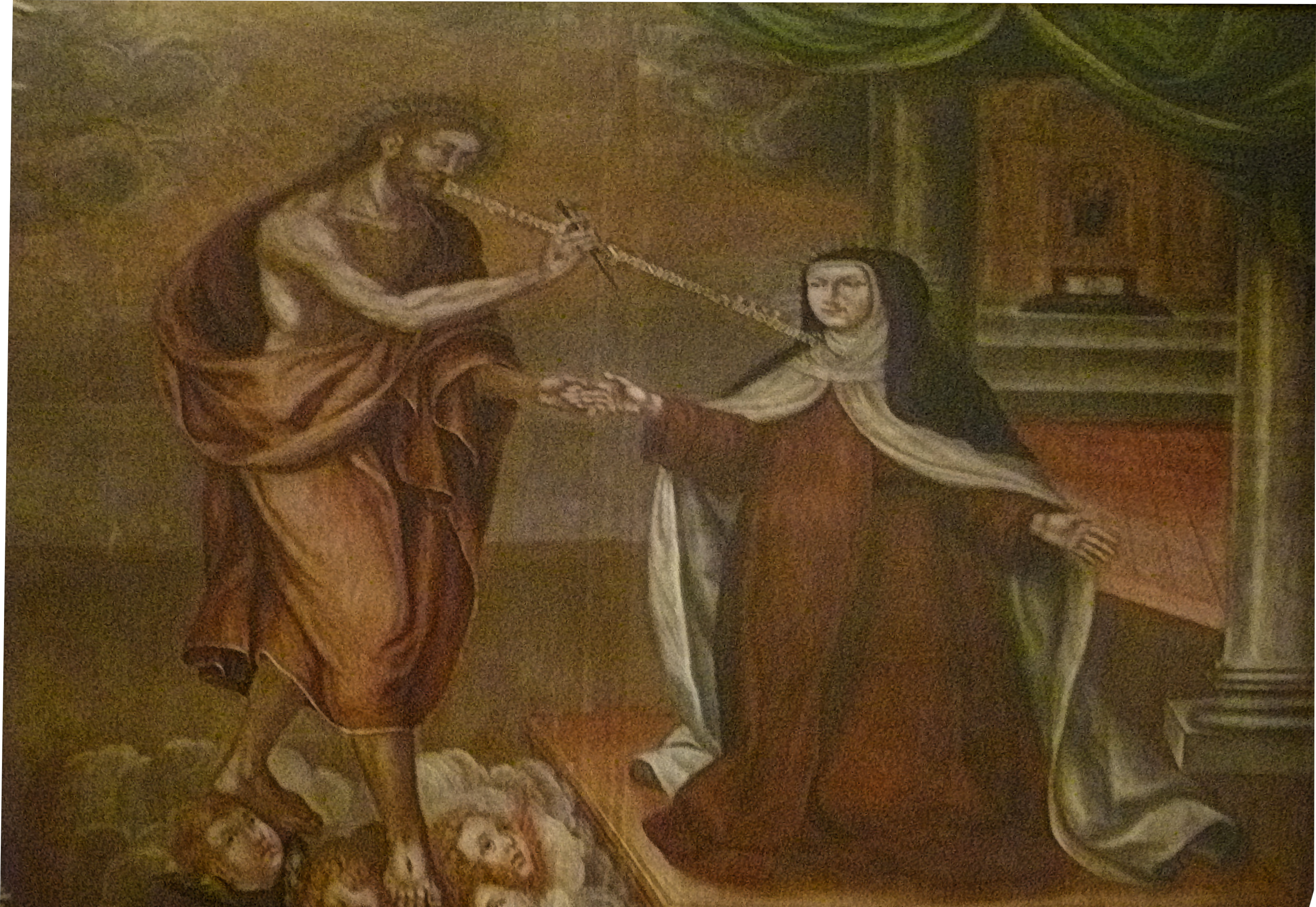
Christ with Saint Teresa of Avila, holding a thorn to pierce her heart

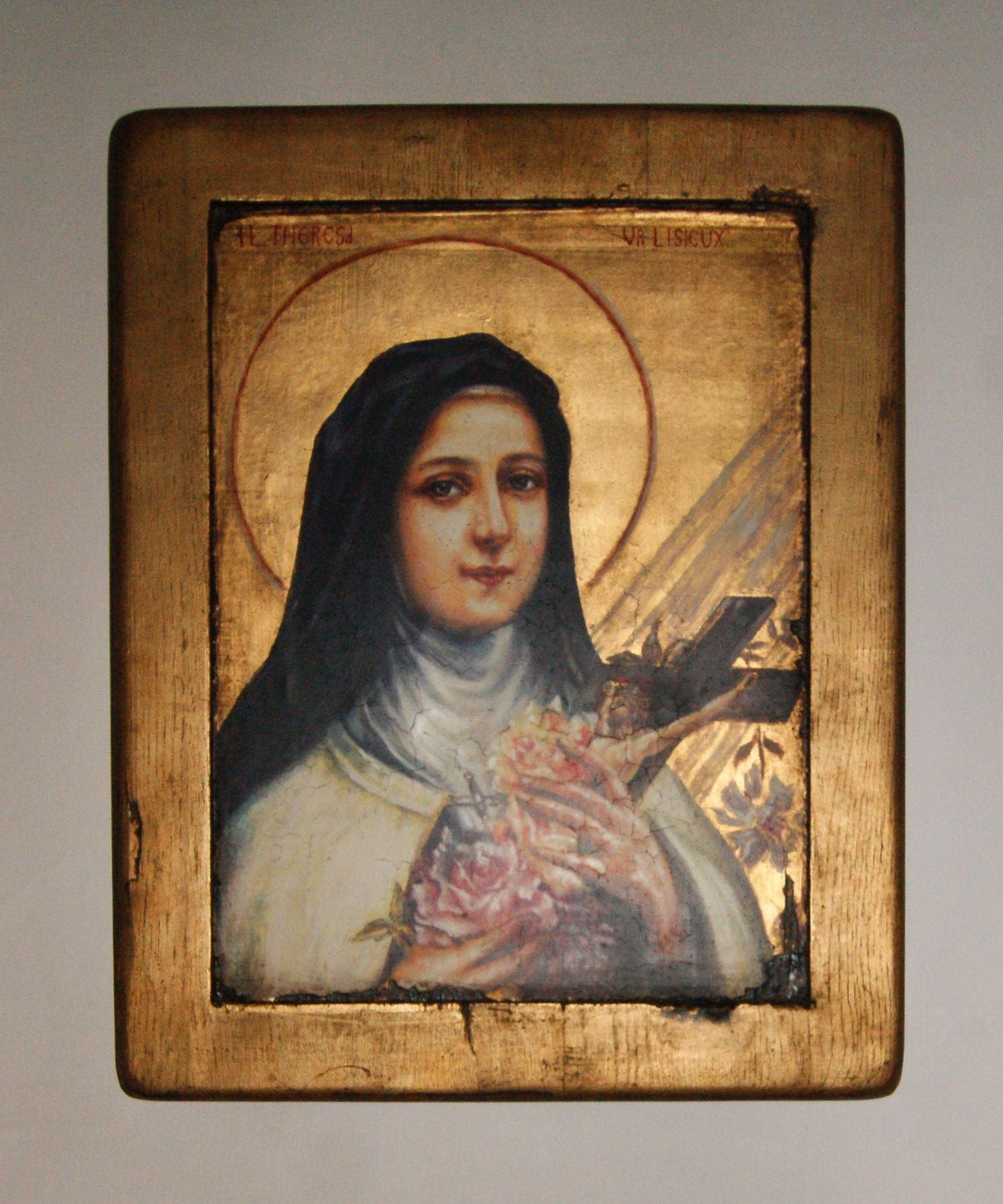
Saint Therese of Lisieux with her attributes

Article title	Attributes
Tadhg Mac Cárthaigh	mitre, pilgrim scallop
Tarasios of Constantinople	Vested as a bishop with omophorion often holding a Gospel book with his right hand raised in blessing
Tarcisius	Host, youth, wounds
Tatiana of Rome	Shown holding a martyr's cross, or a plate with two eyes on it
Tegulus	depicted as a soldier bearing a banner with the Mauritian Cross and the palm of martyrdom; spade
Tekle Haymanot	Man with wings on his back and only one leg visible
Ten thousand martyrs	Crown of martyrdom, Martyr's palm
Teodora Fracasso	Religious habit
Terence of Pesaro	Aging bishop; Young soldier holding a palm of martyrdom and a model of Pesaro
Teresa Benedicta of the cross	habit of a Carmelite nun (sometimes with a yellow badge), cross, martyr's palm, book, Hebrew scroll, holding a tallit, burning bush
Teresa Grillo Michel	Religious habit
Teresa Janina Kierocińska	Religious habit
Teresa Jornet Ibars	Religious habit
Teresa Manganiello	Crucifix, rosary
Teresa of Ávila	habit of a Carmelite nun, holding a (fiery) pen, pierced heart, arrow^{[a]}
Teresa of the Andes	habit of a Carmelite nun, crucifix, crown of flowers^{[a]}
Theban Legion	large group of soldiers
Theobald of Marly	knight bearing the arms of Thann; sometimes depicted wearing armor under his Cistercian habit with his miter at his feet
Theobald of Provins	depicted as a hermit or as a knight
Theodard of Maastricht	sword
Theodore	crocodile^{[a]}
Theodora (wife of Justinian I)	Imperial vestment
Theodore Stratelates	Dressed as a warrior, with spear and shield, or as a civilian
Theodore Tiron	Dressed as a soldier sometimes in court dress, with emblems such as a spear, temple, torch, dragon, pyre, martyr's wreath
Theodorus and Theophanes	Hymnographer
Theodosia of Constantinople	martyr's cross, monastic habit, icon of Christ Pantocrator
Theodosius (son of Maurice)	Imperial attire
Theodosius of Kiev	Clothed as an Eastern Orthodox monk, sometimes with an hegumen's paterissa
Theodotus of Ancyra (martyr)	torches; sword
Theonestus of Vercelli	depicted as a soldier
Theophilus of Corte	Franciscan habit
Thérèse Couderc	Religious habit
Thérèse of Lisieux	Discalced Carmelite habit, many roses, sometimes entwining a crucifix^{[a]}
Thiemo	Spindle
Thillo	Benedictine abbot holding a chalice and a pastoral staff
Thomas Aquinas	The Summa theologiae, a model church, the sun on the chest of a Dominican friar, monstrance, dove, ox^{[a]}
Thomas Becket	sword, and wearing chancellor's robe and neck chain^{[a]}
Thomas Garnet	Jesuit habit, martyr's palm
Thomas More	dressed in the robe of the Chancellor and wearing the Collar of Esses; axe^{[a]}
Thomas of Celano	Crucifix, Franciscan habit
Thomas of Villanova	A bishop distributing alms to the poor
Thomas Saleh	Franciscan habit
Thomas Sherwood (martyr)	holding a scroll
Thomas the Apostle	The Twin, placing his finger in the side of Christ, nelumbo nucifera, spear (means of his Christian martyrdom), square
Three Holy Hierarchs	Vested as bishops, wearing omophoria; raising right hand in blessing; holding Gospel Books or scrolls
Three Martyrs of Chimbote	Franciscan habit, Priest's cassock
Thyrsus	bucksaw
Tiburcio Arnáiz Muñoz	Priest's attire
Tikhon of Zadonsk	Vested as a bishop, often holding a Gospel Book or scroll, with his right hand raised in blessing
Timothy	pastoral staff, three stones and a clubclub and stones; broken image of Diana
Tiridates III of Armenia	Crown, sword, cross, Globus cruciger
Titian of Oderzo	episcopal attire
Titus Brandsma	Calced Carmelite habit, Nazi concentration camp badge, Martyr's palm
Tomasa Ortiz Real	Religious habit
Tommaso Bellacci	Franciscan habit
Tommaso da Cori	Franciscan habit, Crucifix
Tommaso da Olera	Capuchin habit
Tommaso Maria Fusco	Crucifix, Zucchetto
Tommaso Riccardi	Priest's cassock, Crucifix|Bible
Toribio Romo González	Black cassock, martyr's palm, Eucharist
Torpes of Pisa	palm of martyrdom; sword; boat
Trophimus of Arles	bishop carrying his eyes; bishop having his eyes put out; bishop standing with lions
Trudpert	axe,^{[a]} palm of martyrdom
Tryphine	beheaded woman
Tryphon, Respicius, and Nympha	falcon
Tudwal	bishop holding a dragon^{[a]}
Turibius of Astorga	mitre

=== U ===
U
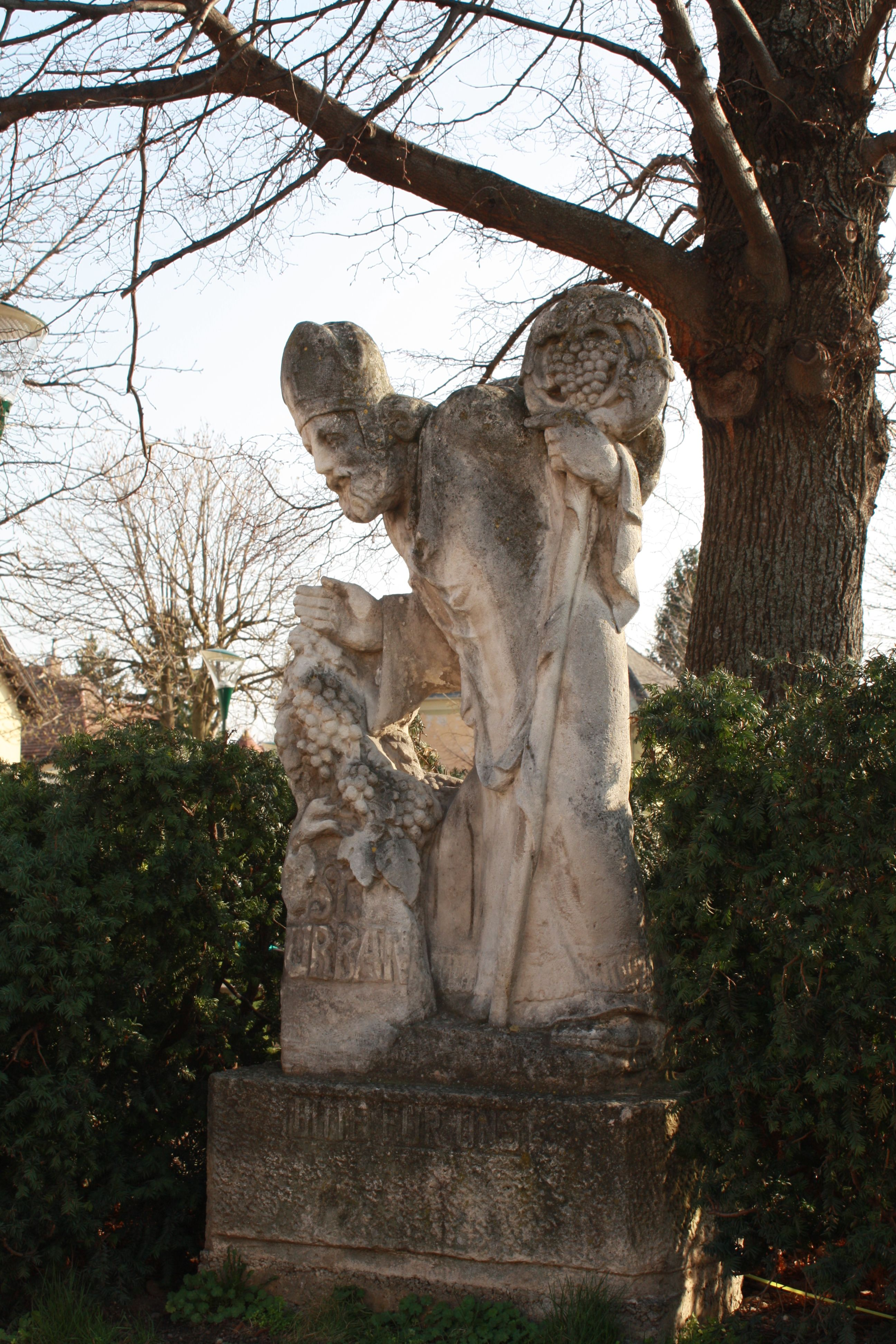
Saint Urban with grapes

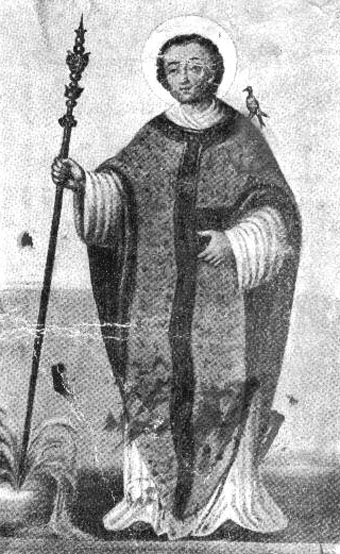
Saint Ursus with birds on his shoulder

Saint	Symbol
Ubald	Bishop giving a blessing as angels carry his crozier; bishop delivering a blessing while a devil flees from it; holding a scale model of Gubbio
Ugolino da Gualdo Cattaneo	Augustinian habit
Ulphia	depicted as a young nun seated in prayer on a rock with a frog in the pool near her
Ulrich of Augsburg	vestments of a bishop, holding a fish; at dinner with Saint Wolfgang; rewarding a messenger with a goose leg; giving a garment to a beggar; with Saint Afra; riding through a river on horseback as his companion sinks; with a cross given him by an angel
Ulrika Nisch	Religious habit of the Sisters of Mercy of the Holy Cross of Ingenbohl
Umiliana de' Cerchi	Franciscan habit
Urban	portrayed in art after his beheading, with the papal tiara near him^{[a]}
Urban V	Papal vestments, Papal tiara
Urban of Langres	vestments of a bishop, with a bunch of grapes or a vine at his side; a book with a wine vessel on it^{[a]}
Uriel	fire in palm, book, scroll, flaming sword, disc of the sun, and a celestial orb or disc of stars and constellations, chalice (only in Ethiopian Orthodox tradition).
Ursicinus	abbot with three lilies in his hand or holding a book and fleur-de-lys, surrounded by fleur-de-lys^{[a]}
Ursula	arrow; banner; cloak; shot with arrows, accompanied by a varied number of virgins who are being martyred in various ways; standing on a ship with her companions^{[a]}
Ursula Ledóchowska	Religious habit
Ursus of Aosta	archdeacon with a staff and book, bearing birds on his shoulder; wearing fur pelisse in a religious habit; striking water from a rock; or giving shoes to the poor.
Ursus of Solothurn	military attire

=== V ===
V
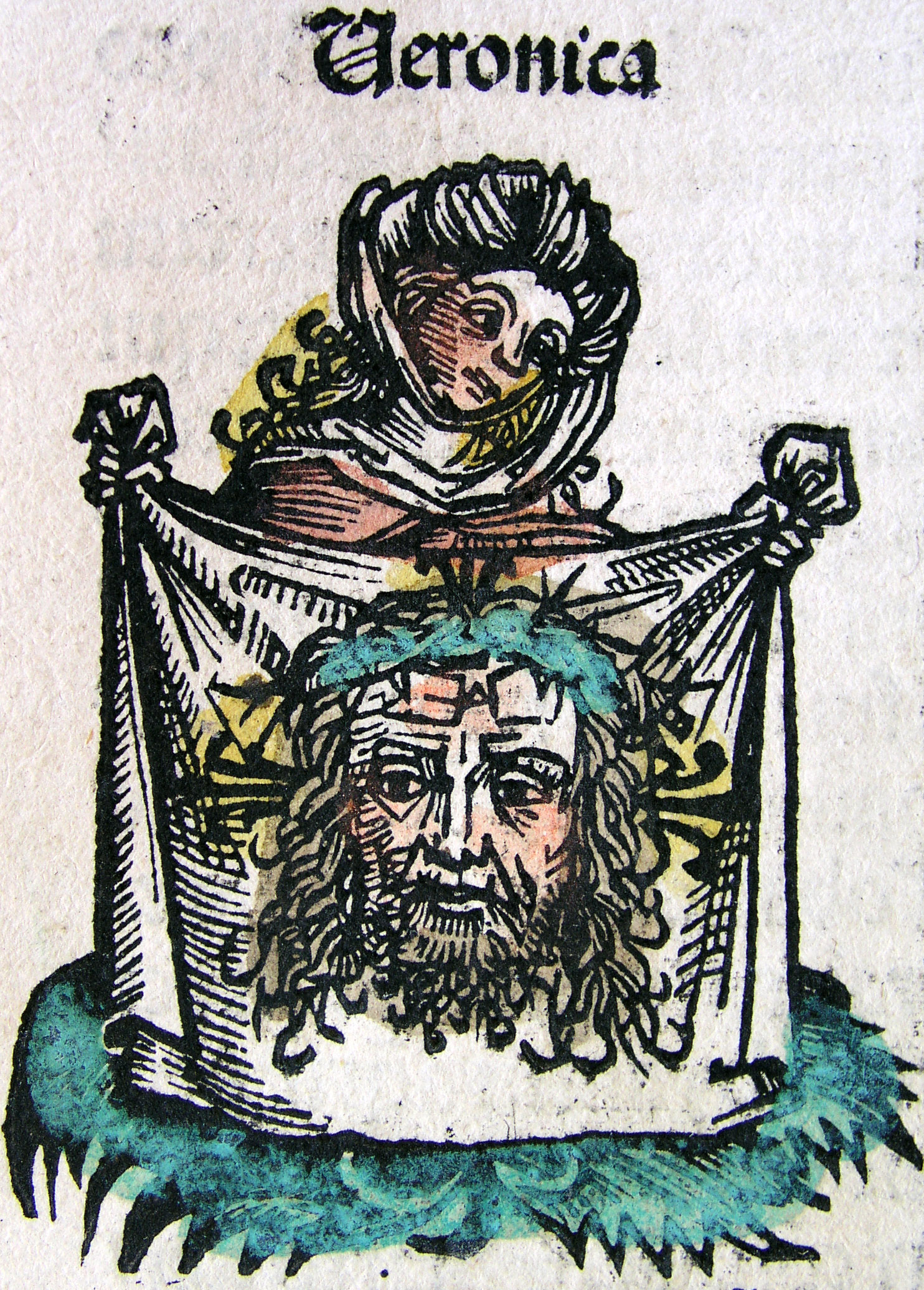
The Veil of Veronica

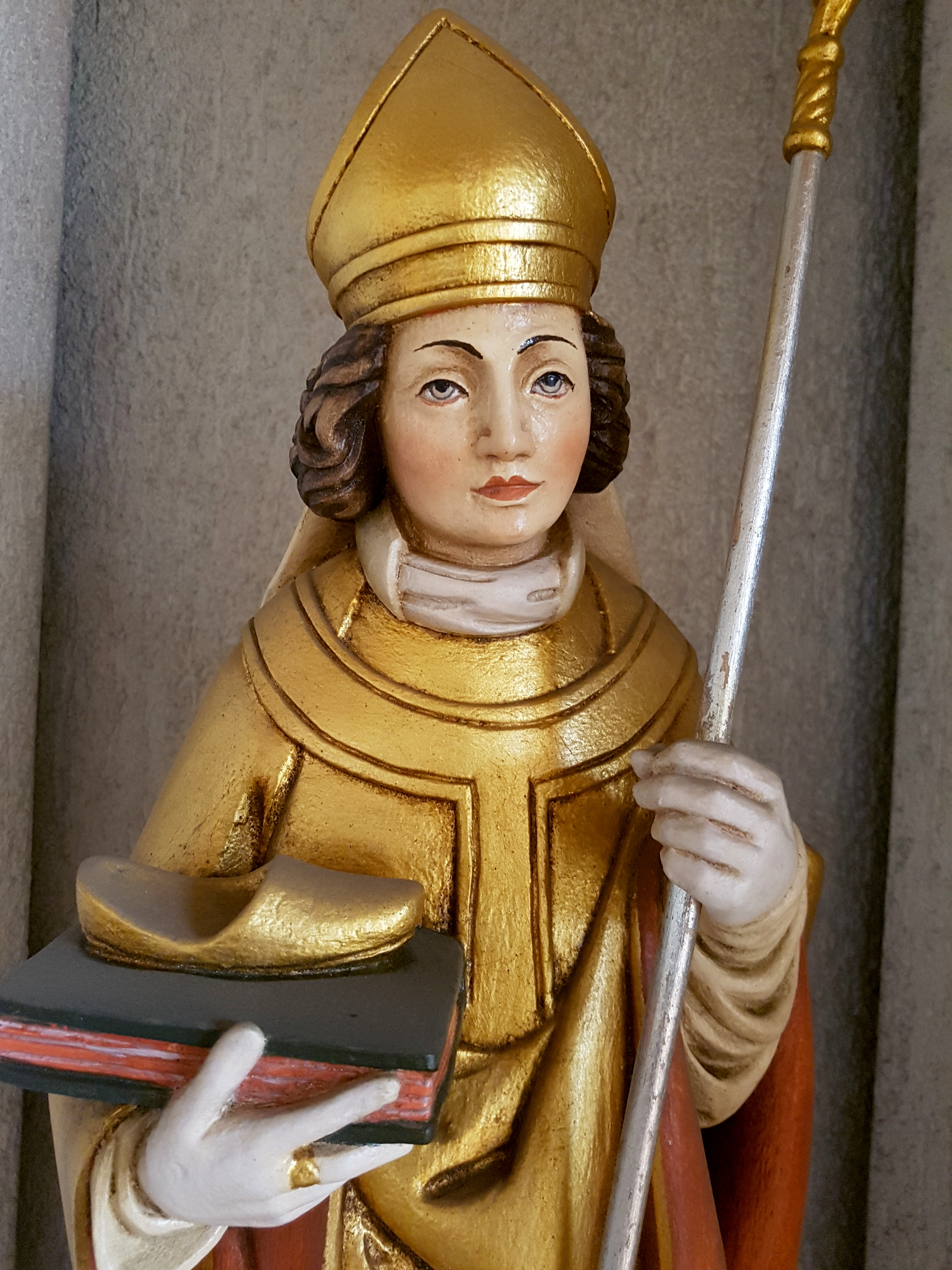
Vigilius with a shoe

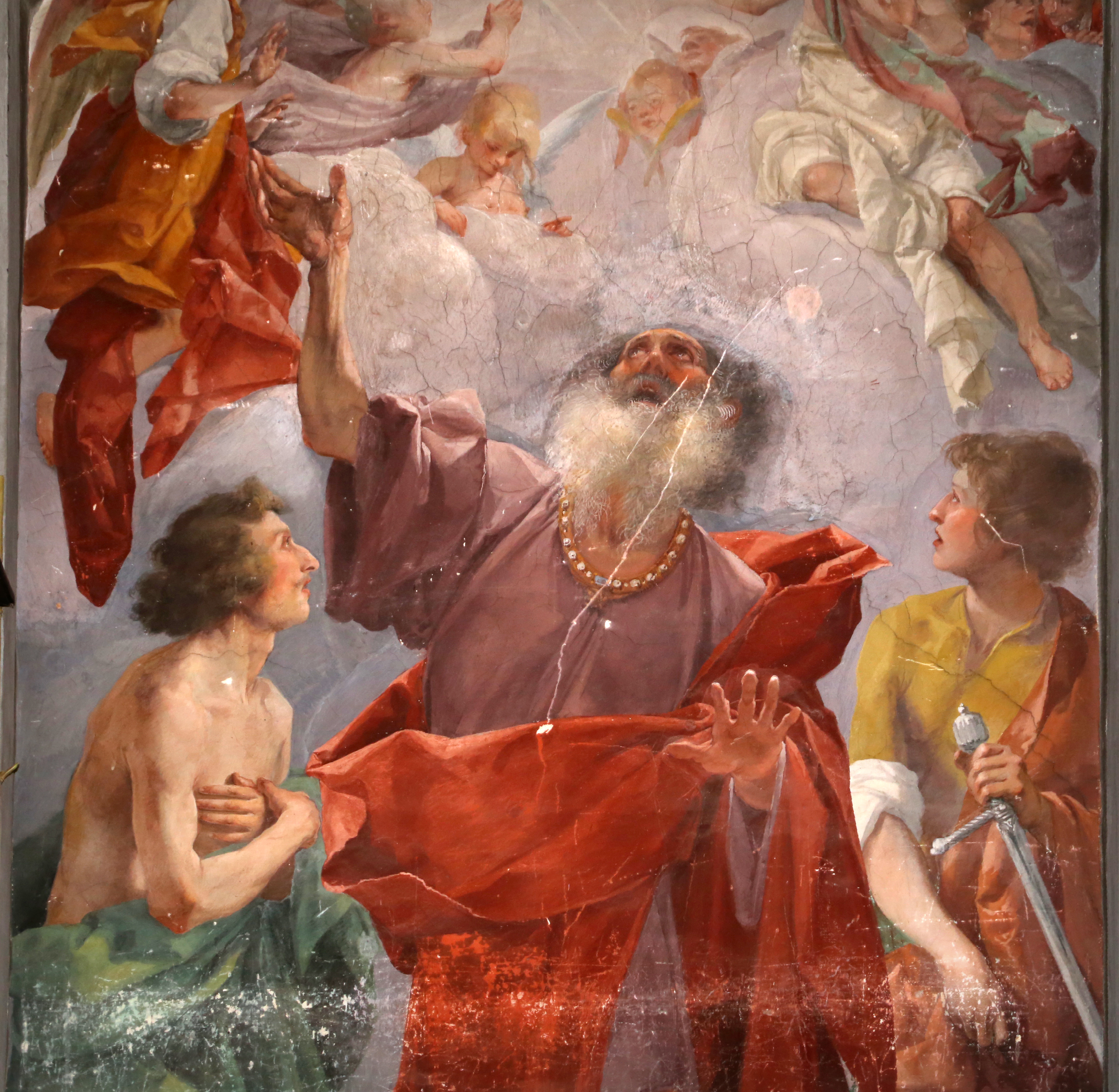
Vitalis of Milan between Saints Gervasius and Protasius

Vitus with a rooster

Article title	Attributes
Valentine	birds; roses; vestments of a priest or a bishop; with a crippled person or a child with epilepsy at his feet; rooster; being beheaded; bearing a sword; holding a sun; giving sight to a blind girl
Valentine of Passau	bishop preaching to pagans
Valeria of Milan	With Saint Vitalis, Saint Gervasius and Saint Protasius; being beaten with clubs
Varghese Payyappilly Palakkappilly	Priest's cassock
Vasyl Velychkovsky	habit of a Redemptorist
Vedast	wolf carrying a goose in its mouth; child; bear^{[a]}
Venantius of Camerino	young man crucified upside-down with smoke coming from his head; young man holding the citadel of Camerino; young man holding the city of Camerino, a palm, and a book; young man with a banner
Venera	crown; book; palm; martyr's cross; martyr's palm interlaced with a triple crown (signifying the fact that she was a Virgin, an Apostle, and a Martyr)
Veranus of Cavaillon	episcopal attire
Verdiana	snakes^{[a]}, depicted as a nun preaching to snakes
Verena of Zurzach	jar and bread, comb
Veronica	Veil of Veronica^{[a]}
Veronica Antal	Palm of martyrdom
Veronica Giuliani	Crowned with thorns and embracing a crucifix
Vicelinus	Church resting on his left arm
Vicenta Chávez Orozco	Religious habit
Vicenta María López i Vicuña	Religious habit
Vicente Garrido Pastor	Priest's cassock
Vicente Liem de la Paz	book, palm, hood, rosary, academic birreta, dalmatic
Victor of Marseilles	windmill^{[a]}
Victoire Rasoamanarivo	Rosary
Victor Emilio Moscoso Cárdenas	Priest's cassock
Victor Maurus	man being thrown into a furnace; man roasted in an oven; Moorish soldier trampling on a broken altar
Victor of Marseilles	Depicted as a Roman soldier with a millstone; depicted overthrowing a statue of Jupiter; in stocks, comforted by angels; scourged and crushed by a millstone; or with his body beheaded and flung into the river, from which the angels take it; depicted with windmill
Victoria	with Saint Acisclus, her brother, crowned with roses, arrow and palm branch
Victorinus of Pettau	Palm, pontifical vestments
Vigilius of Trent	bishop holding a shoe, wooden holzschuh
Viktor of Xanten	Military attire
Villana de' Botti	Dominican habit
Vincent de Paul	children ^{[a]}
Vincent Ferrer	Dominican habit, Tongue of flame, Wings, Bible, pulpit, cardinal's hat, trumpet, captives^{[a]}
Vincent of Saragossa	Usually pontifical, episcopal, etc. insignia, tools of martyrdom and so forth
Vincent Pallotti	Priest's cassock
Vincent Romano	Priest's attire, Crucifix, Book of Hours
Vincenza Gerosa	Religious habit
Vincenza Maria Poloni	Religious habit, Crucifix
Vincenzina Cusmano	Religious habit
Vincenzo Grossi	Cassock
Vincenzo Lipani	Franciscan habit
Vitalis of Milan	with Saint Gervase and Saint Protase
Vitus	book, martyr's cross, rooster, lion, bread, cauldron, eagle, hare; holding a church model^{[a]}
Vladimir the Great	crown, cross, throne

=== W ===
W
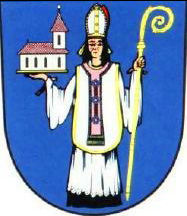
Saint Wolfgang holding a church model with an adze lodged in the roof (Coat of arms of the Czech municipality Hnanice).

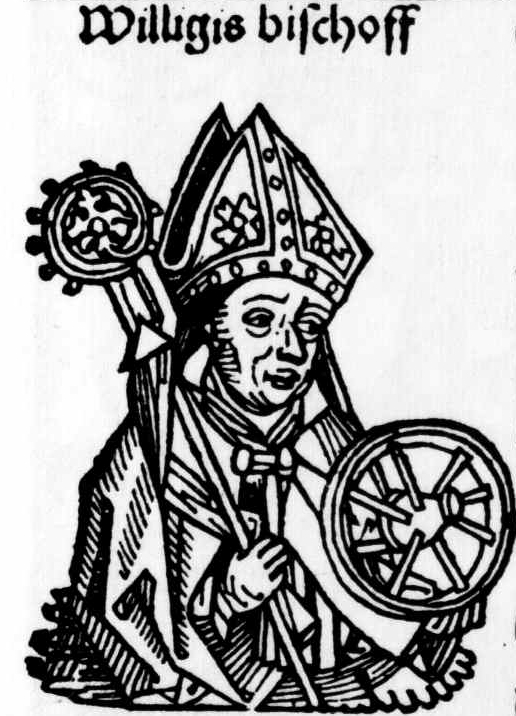
Willigis with the Wheel of Mainz

Article title	Attributes
Wenceslaus of Bohemia	crown, dagger^{[a]}, burning eagle on a banner
Wendreda	Nun, healer
Werenfried of Elst	Priest who holds a ship containing a coffin
Werner of Oberwesel	sickle, shovel, pan
Wiborada	Benedictine habit, book, axe
Wilgefortis	bearded; crucified, often shown with a small fiddler at her feet, and with one shoe off
Willehad	bishop overturning idols
William Firmatus	thrusting his arm into a fire, a raven showing him the way to the Holy Land
William of Maleval	cross, skull
William of Montevergine	wolf and crosier^{[a]}
William of Norwich	holding nails, with nail wounds or undergoing crucifixion
William of Perth	walking staff, palmer's wallet, little dog.
William of York	bishop's vestments, crozier, crossing the River Tweed^{[a]}
Willibrord	dipping staff into cask
Willigis	Wheel of Mainz
Winibald	insignia of an abbot, bricklayer's trowel, with Willibald and Richard the Pilgrim
Saint Winifred	sword, sometimes with her head under her arm
Winnoc	crown and scepter at his feet, turning a hand-mill, often with a church and bridge nearby; in ecstasy while grinding corn^{[a]}; with Saint Bertin
Władysław Bukowiński	Priest's cassock
Władysław Findysz	Priest's attire
Wolfgang of Regensburg	depicted with a church model with an adze lodged in the roof, with a wolf^{[a]}
Wulfram of Sens	Bishop baptizing a young king or with a young king nearby, arriving by ship with monks

=== X ===
X
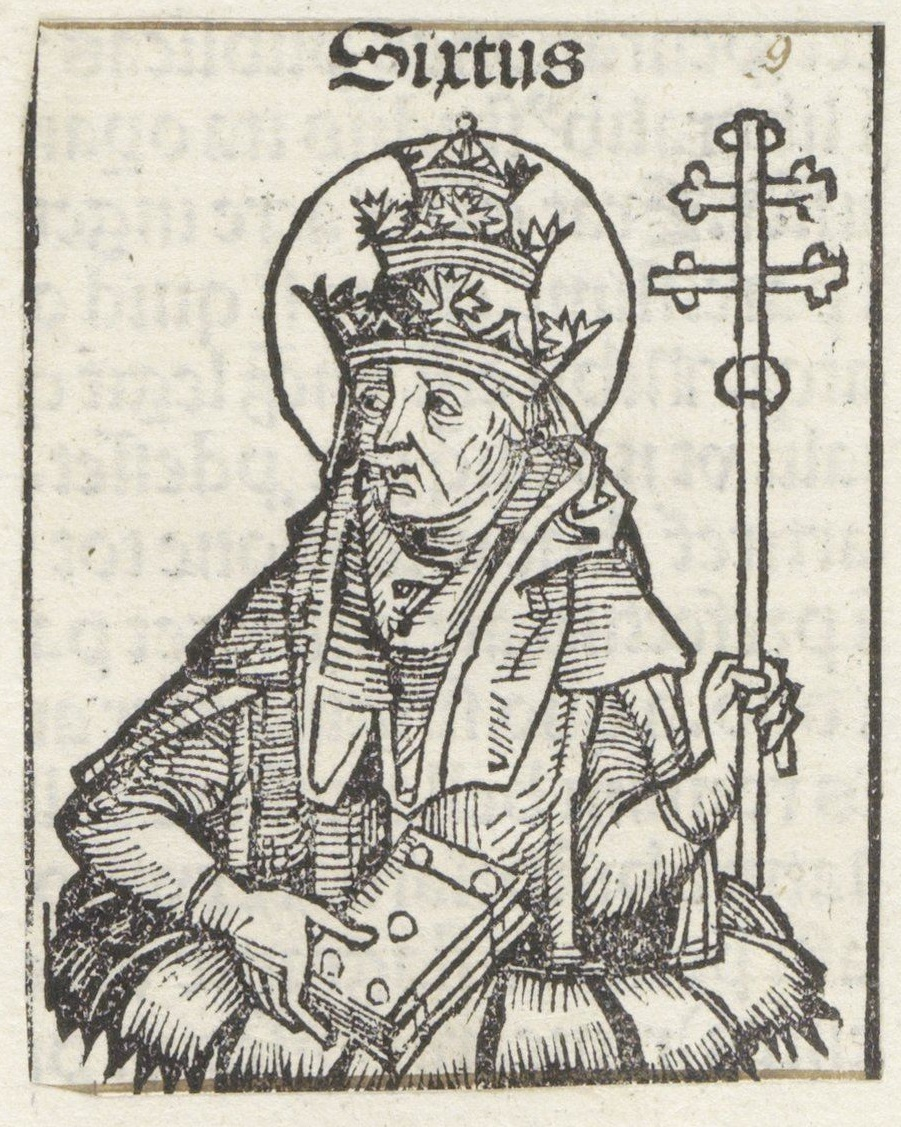
Pope Xystus (Sixtus) with book and papal tiara

Saint	Symbol
Xenia of Saint Petersburg	walking stick^{[a]}
Xystus	book, papal insignia (mostly tiara and papal ferula), martyr's palm, book^{[a]}
Xu Guangqi	Ming Empire court dress holding a crucifix and book.

=== Y ===
Y
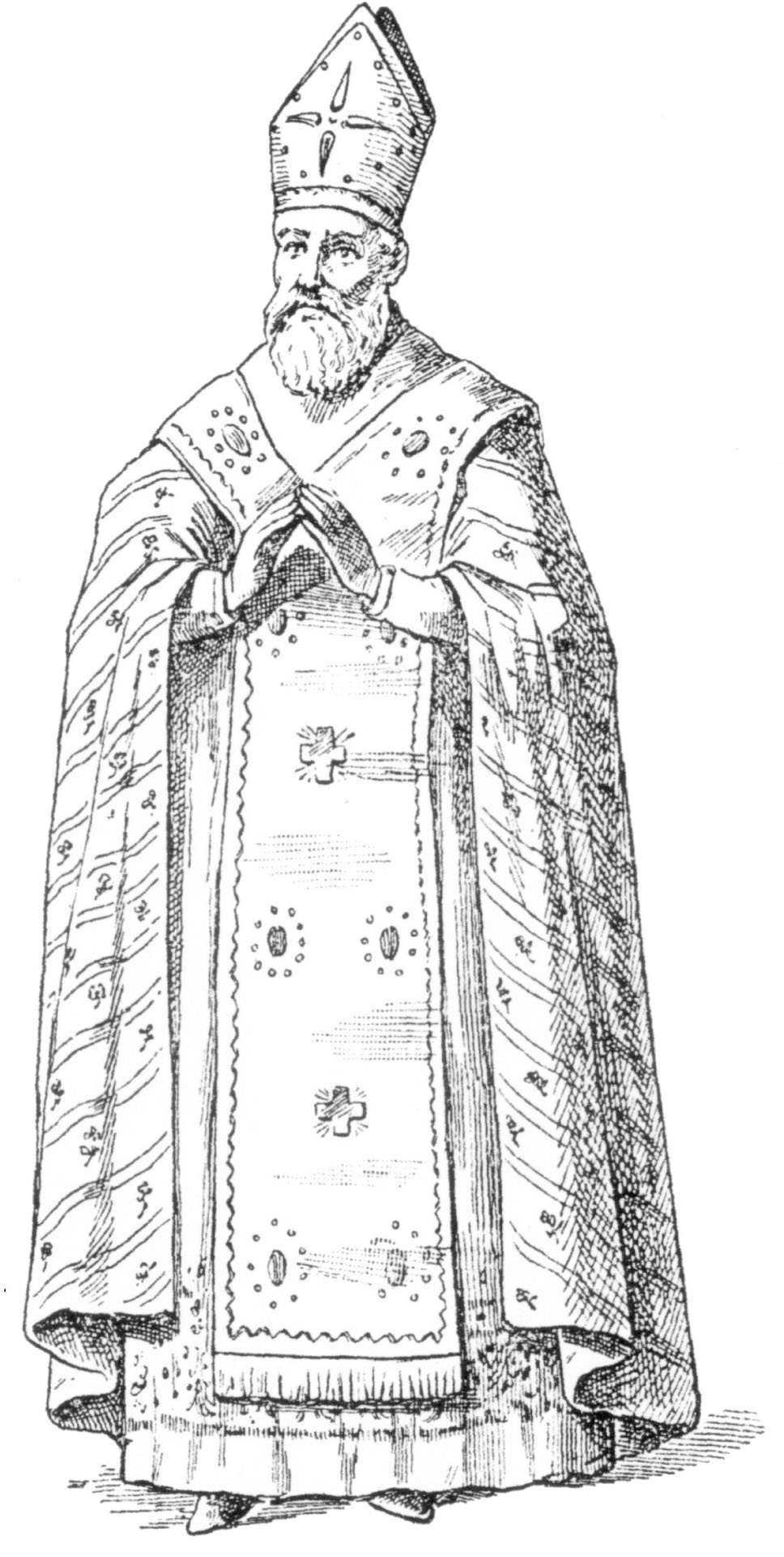
Bishop's vestments

Saint	Symbol
Yrieix	bishop's vestments, crozier^{[a]}
Yaropolk Izyaslavich	royal clothes, holding a three-bar cross in his right hand
Yaroslav the Wise	Grand Prince's robes, sword, church model, book or scroll
Yared	traditional attire, holding a mequamia (prayer stick), tsanatsel (Ethiophian sistrum) in front of Deggua book and three chants: Ge'ez, Ezel and Araray represented in terms of doves
Yevgeny Rodionov	Wearing a military uniform and cross necklace, holding a martyr's cross

=== Z ===
Z
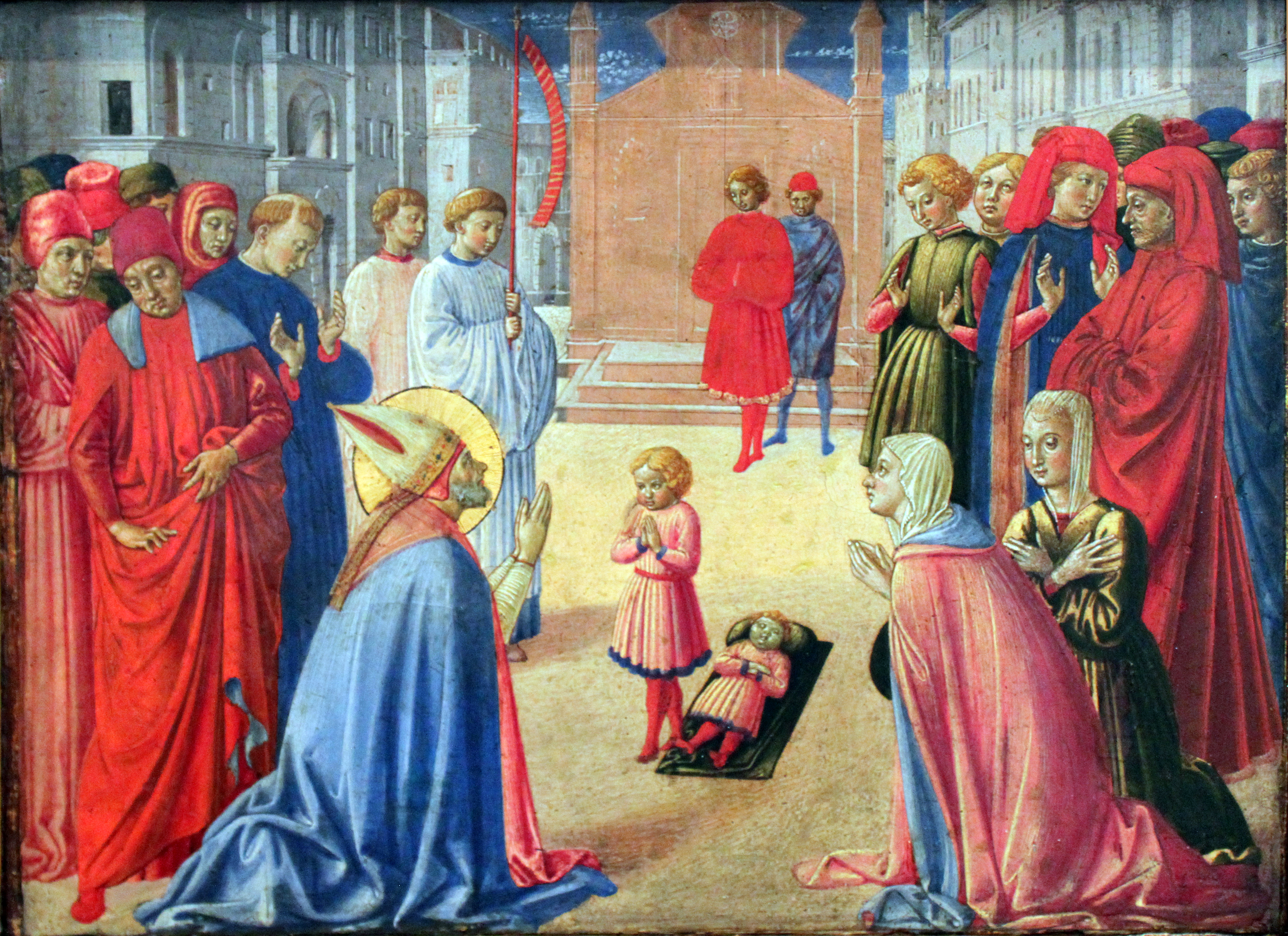
Saint Zenobius resurrects a dead boy

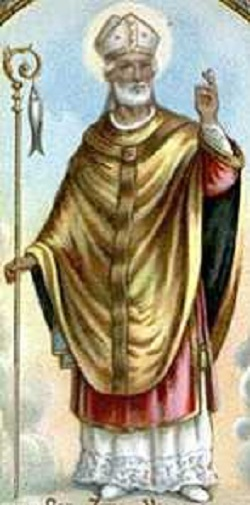
Zeno of Verona with a fish hanging from his crozier

Saint	Symbol
Zachary	with King Luitprand, olive branch, dove]] over him ^{[a]}
Zadkiel	Dagger
Zefirino Agostini	Cassock, breviary
Zeno of Verona	fish, fishing rod, fish hanging from his crozier.
Zenobius of Florence	vestments of a bishop; flowering tree; bringing a dead man or a boy back to life^{[a]}
Zita	bag, keys^{[a]}
Zita of Bourbon-Parma	imperial attire, medals
Zofia Czeska	religious habit
Zoltán Meszlényi	book, palm, mitre
Zygmunt Gorazdowski	priest's attire

== See also ==
- Christian symbolism
- Arma Christi
- Animals in Christian art
- Plants in Christian iconography
