= Eligijus =

Eligijus is a masculine Lithuanian given name. Notable people with the name include:

- Eligijus Jankauskas (born 1998), Lithuanian footballer
- Eligijus Masiulis (born 1974), Lithuanian politician

== See also ==
- Eligius
