= St Peter's Church, Le Crotoy =

St Peter's, Le Crotoy
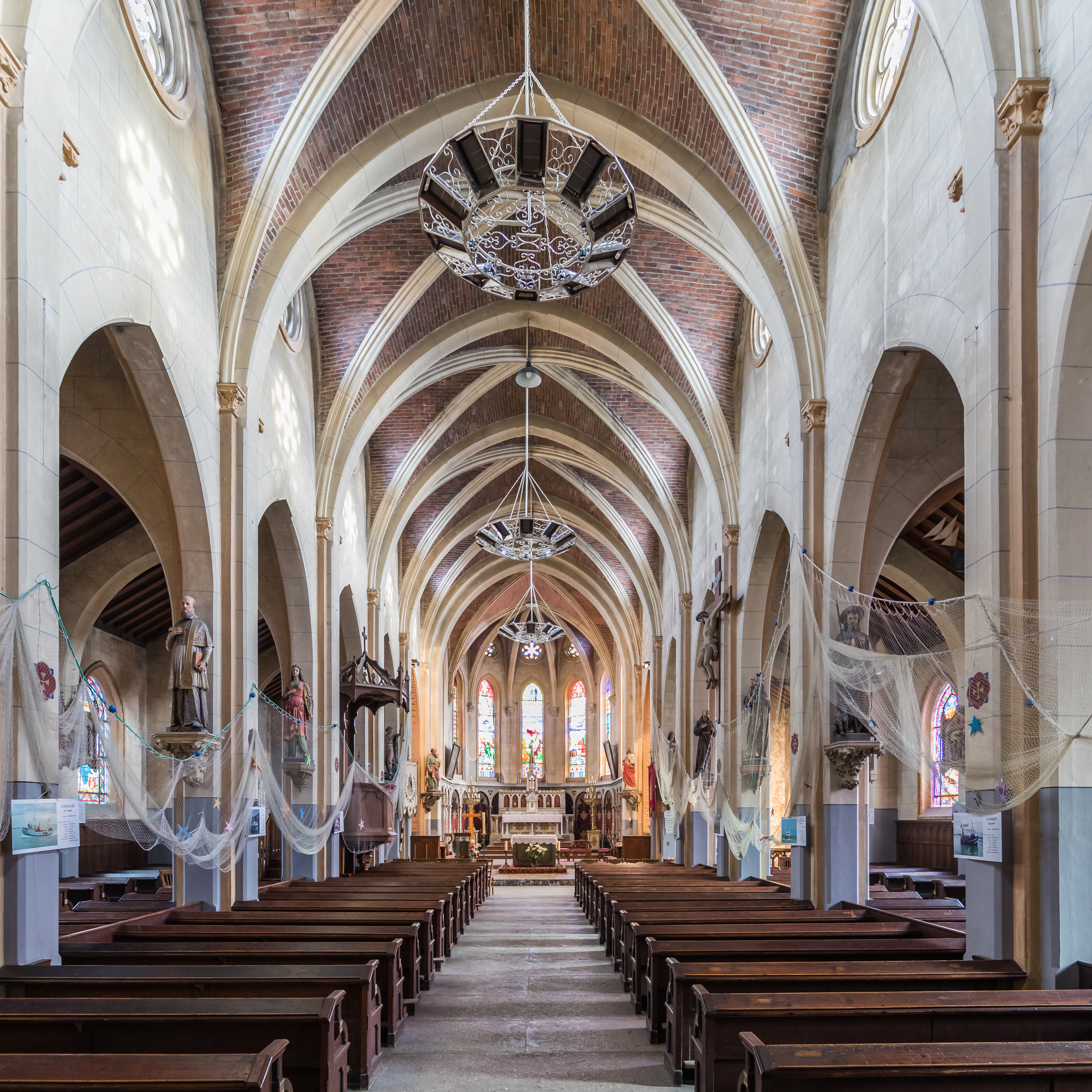
- Interior of the St Peter's Church
- St Peter's, Le Crotoy
- 50.214942°N 1.624975°E
- Location: Le Crotoy, Picardy
- Country: France

Architecture
- Functional status: Active

St Peter's Church is a church in Le Crotoy, a coastal town at the Bay of the Somme river in Picardy in northern France. The church is remarkable for its front tower built in the 13th century and its interior. An ancient map of Le Crotoy and its fortress can be found in the church along with an altarpiece depicting the life of St. Honoré who lived in the 15th century, as well as ex voto ships.

== History ==
The St Peter's Church was formerly called Notre Dame Church and was the parish church of Le Crotoy. This sailors' chapel, dedicated to St Peter, was located in the St Peter Street in Le Crotoy, on the spot were today the St Peter's church can be found. The old church, like the one in Saint-Valery-sur-Somme, had two parallel aisles and was surrounded by the cemetery. The building was such a dilapidated state that in 1850 the mayor and the priest decided to rebuild it. Both ships were destroyed and only the front tower of the 13th century was preserved. The work was completed in February 1865.

== Altarpiece of St. Honoré ==
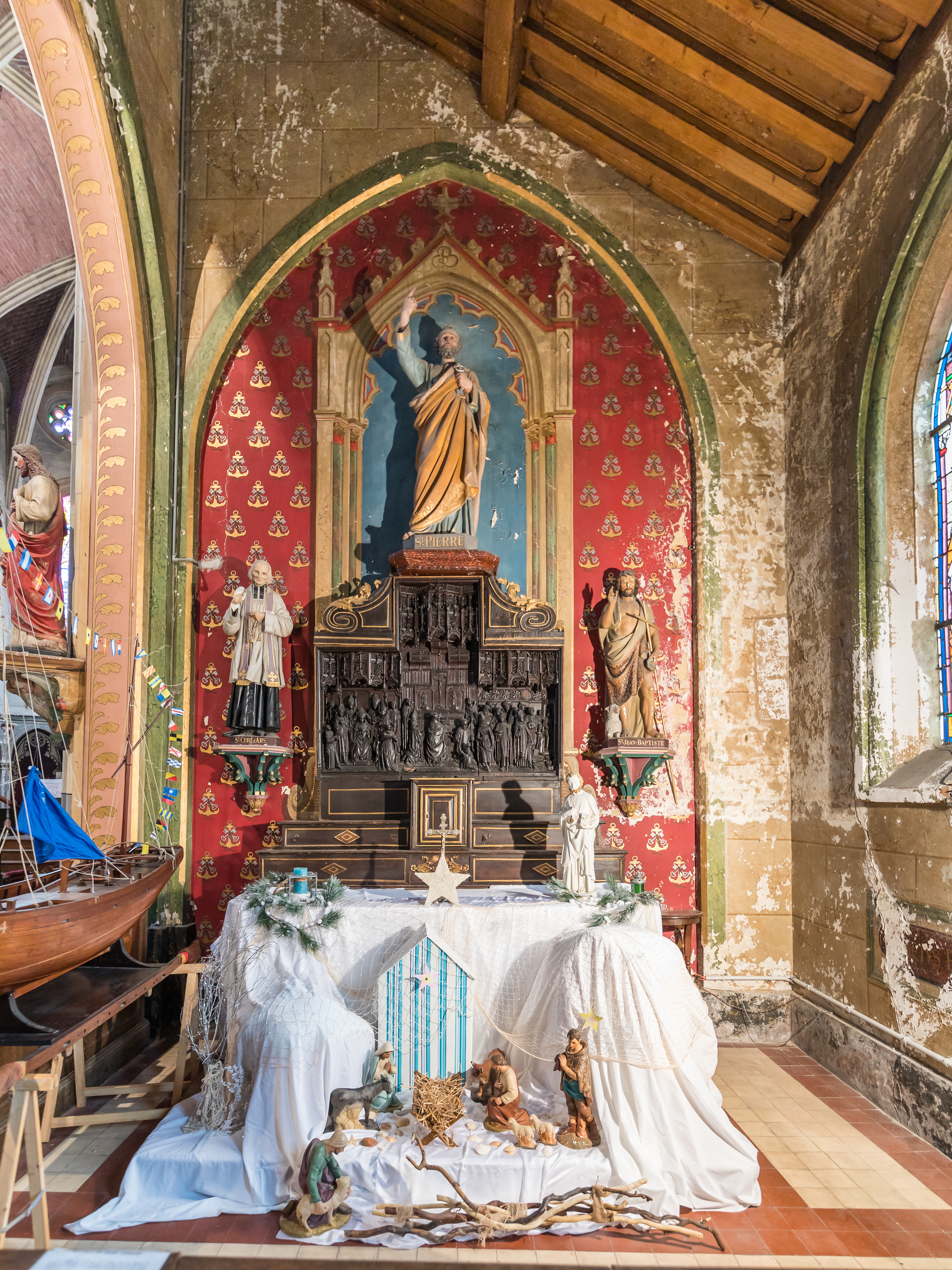
Altarpiece in the St Peter's church, Le Crotoy

The altarpiece dating back to the end of the 15th century was originally part of the Thuison abbey in Abbeville. During the French Revolution in 1789 the altarpiece was sold, just like all other goods of the monastery, and bought by an antique dealer in Abbeville. In 1792 the abbot Delahaye, a refugee at his father in Le Crotoy, noticed the altar and the altarpiece at the antique dealer. Together with his father he purchased the altarpiece and offered it to the parish.

The figures depicted on the altarpiece are dressed in a fashion that was common for the end of the 14th century. The three figures depict:

- Left: St Honoré is ordained bishop
- Center: St Honoré celebrates the mass.
- Right: In the presence of St Honoré, 3 bodies of Picardian martyrs are being discovered: St Fuscien, St Victoric and St Gentien.
