= Hunna =

French Roman Catholic saint

Saint Hunna
- Died: 679
- Venerated in: Roman Catholic Church
- Canonized: 1520 by Pope Leo X
- Feast: 15 April
- Patronage: laundresses, laundry workers, washerwomen

Hunna (also called Huna and Huva, birth unknown, d. 679), is a saint venerated in the Catholic Church. Born in Alsace in eastern France, she is the patroness of laundresses; her feast day is April 15. She was canonized by Pope Leo X in 1520.

Not much is known about her, but she was the daughter of a duke and born into "a privileged life". She married Huno of Hunnaweyer, a nobleman and aristocrat. They had one son. Her family was influenced by the former bishop and hermit Saint Deodatus of Nevers, who inspired her to serve her poor neighbors. In addition to caring for her family, home, and estate while her husband traveled for political and diplomatic reasons, she spent her time in prayer and visited her neighbors daily, caring for the sick and providing them with religious instruction, cooking, cleaning, bathing, and childcare, as well as washing and replacing their clothes, which earned her the name the "Holy Washerwoman". Her son, who was named after Deodatus and was baptized by him, became a monk at the monastery he founded in Ebersheim, Bas-Rhin in northeastern France and also became a saint.

Scholar Jane Tibbetts Schulenburg placed Hunna in the tradition of what she called the "domestic saint" or "holy housekeeper", pious and noble women in the Middle Ages, who like Hunna, conducted public roles such as founders and abbesses of convents, but whose "popular and local fame rested on her pious activity of washing the clothing of the poor", from where she received her nickname.
