= Solange of Bourges =

Frankish saint

Saint Solange of Bourges
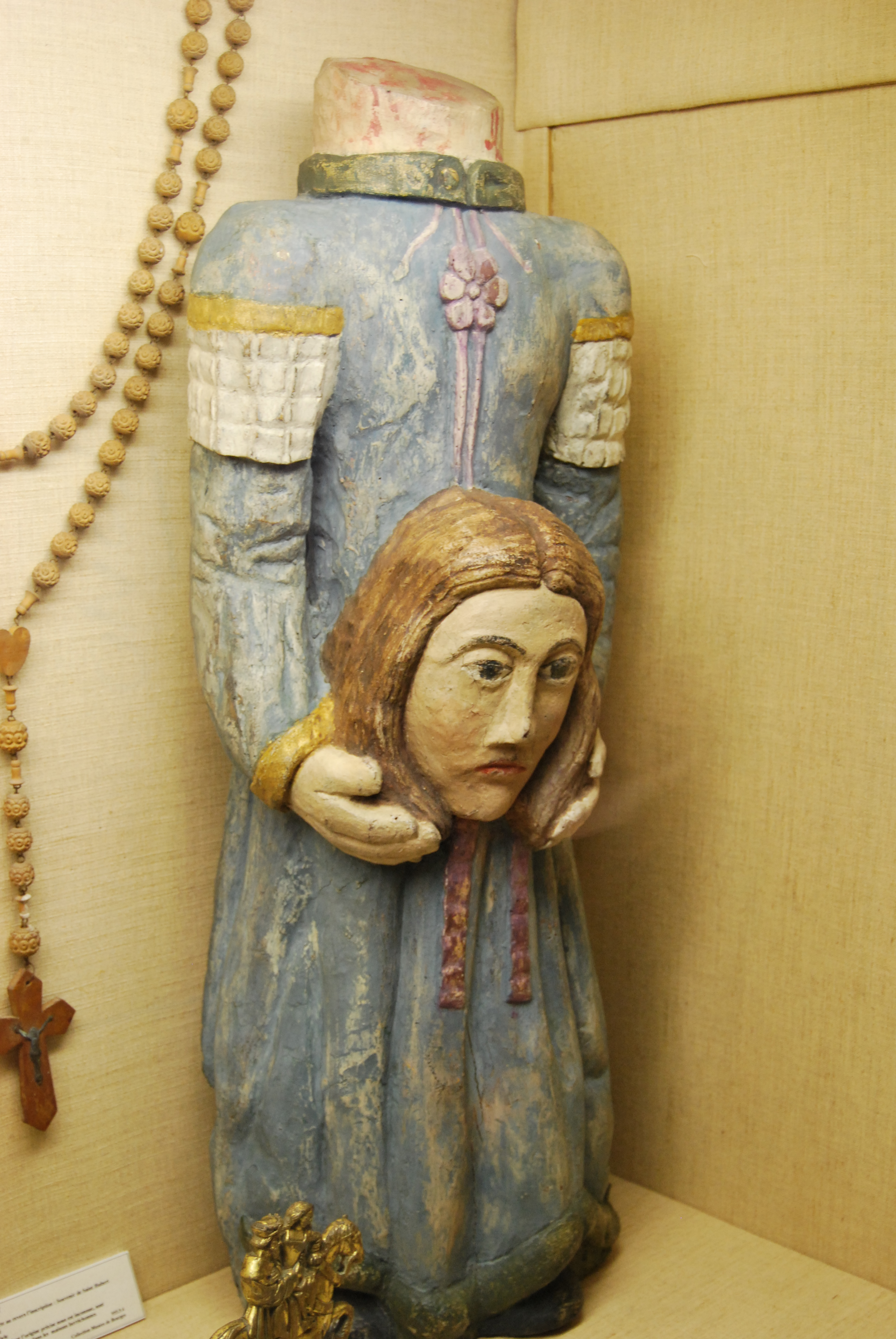

Virgin Martyr
- Born: 9th century near Bourges, France
- Died: c. 880
- Venerated in: Roman Catholic Church, especially in Sainte-Solange, Archdiocese of Bourges
- Feast: 10 May
- Attributes: shepherdess in prayer
- Patronage: Berry, France, Bourges, France, for rain, rape victims, shepherds

Solange (died 10 May, c. 880) was a Frankish shepherdess and a locally venerated Christian saint and cephalophore, whose cult is restricted to Sainte-Solange, Cher. Saint Solange was the patron of the traditional Province of Berry, of which Cher is a part.

Solange was born to a poor, but devout family in the town of Villemont, near Bourges, and consecrated her virginity at the age of seven; according to some, her mere presence cured the sick and exorcised devils. The son of the count of Poitiers was highly taken with the beauty and popularity of Solange and approached her when she was tending to her sheep, but she rejected his suit. He argued with her to no avail, and so he decided to abduct her.

At night, he came and took Solange by force, but she struggled so violently that she fell from his horse while he was crossing a stream. Her abductor grew enraged and beheaded her with his sword. According to the fully-developed legend, Solange's severed head invoked three times the Holy Name of Jesus, and like Saint Denis and other saints in Gaulish territories, Solange picked up her head in her own hands and walked with it as far as the church of Saint-Martin in the village of Saint-Martin-du-Crot (which now bears the name of Sainte-Solange, the only commune in France to bear this name), only dropping truly dead there.

== Veneration ==
Immediately, a cult surrounding her grew. Many miraculous cures were attributed to her intercession. In 1281, an altar was erected in her honour at that church, and it preserved her severed head as a relic and began to call itself the church of St. Solange, while a nearby field where she had prayed began to be referred to as the "Field of St. Solange". It was a habit of the locals, in times of great stress, to form a procession through Bourges with the reliquary head before them and to invoke her against drought.

Solange's feast day in the Roman Catholic Church is 10 May.

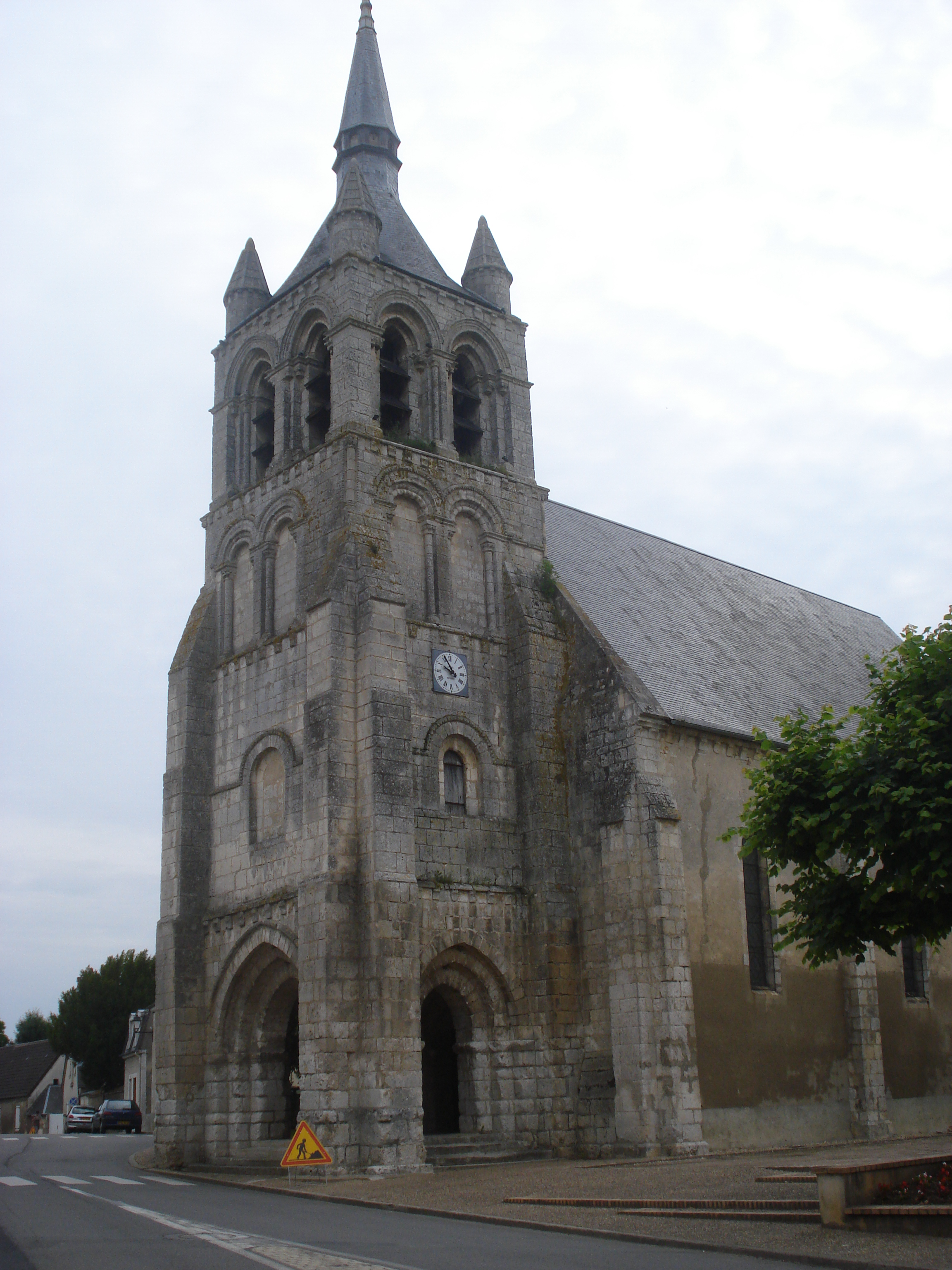
Church of St. Solange. Sainte-Solange, Cher, France.
