= Urban of Langres =

Gallo-Roman saint and bishop (327 – c. 390)

Saint Urban of Langres
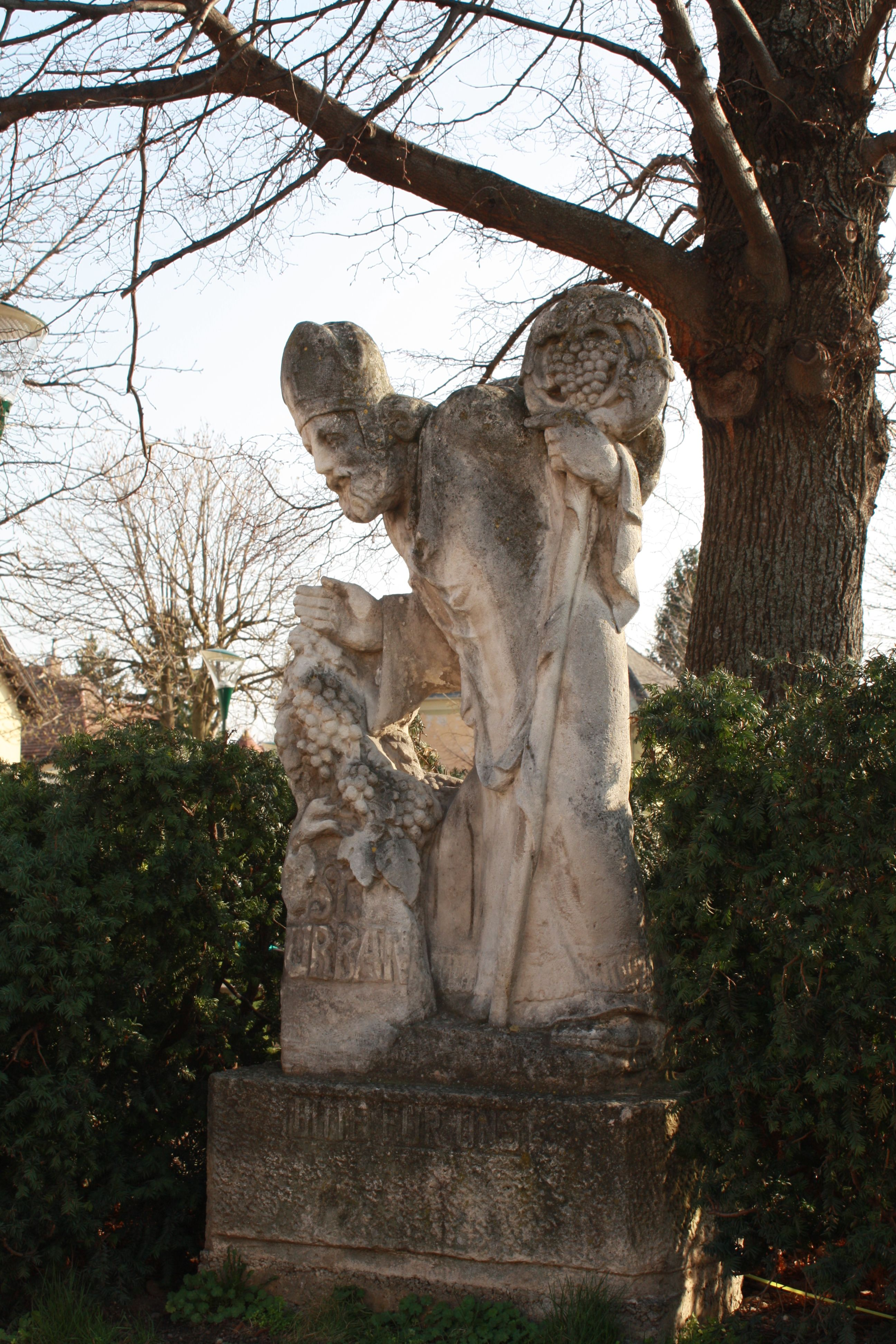

Bishop of Langres
- Born: 327
- Died: c. 390
- Venerated in: Eastern Orthodox Church; Roman Catholic Church
- Canonized: pre-Congregation
- Feast: 2 April; 23 January in Langres
- Attributes: bishop with a bunch of grapes or a vine at his side; a book with a wine vessel on it; grapes on a missal as he holds the triple cross
- Patronage: Langres; Dijon; vine-growers, vine-dressers, gardeners, vintners, and coopers; invoked against blight, frost, storms, alcoholism, and faintness

Urban of Langres (327 – c. 390) was a Gallo-Roman saint and bishop. He served as the sixth bishop of Langres from 374 until his death. Leodegaria was his sister.

== Life ==
Urban was the bishop of Lingonum (now Langres), Gallia Lugdunensis, beginning in 374. Legend states that soon after taking his position, political turmoil erupted, and he was driven from his house. Urban hid from his persecutors in a vineyard. The vine-dressers in the area concealed him, and he took the opportunity to convert them to Christianity. Those same vine-dressers then helped him in his covert ministry, as he moved from one town to another via their vineyards. Urban developed great affection for all the people in the wine industry, and they for him. Urban is thus the patron saint of vine-dressers.

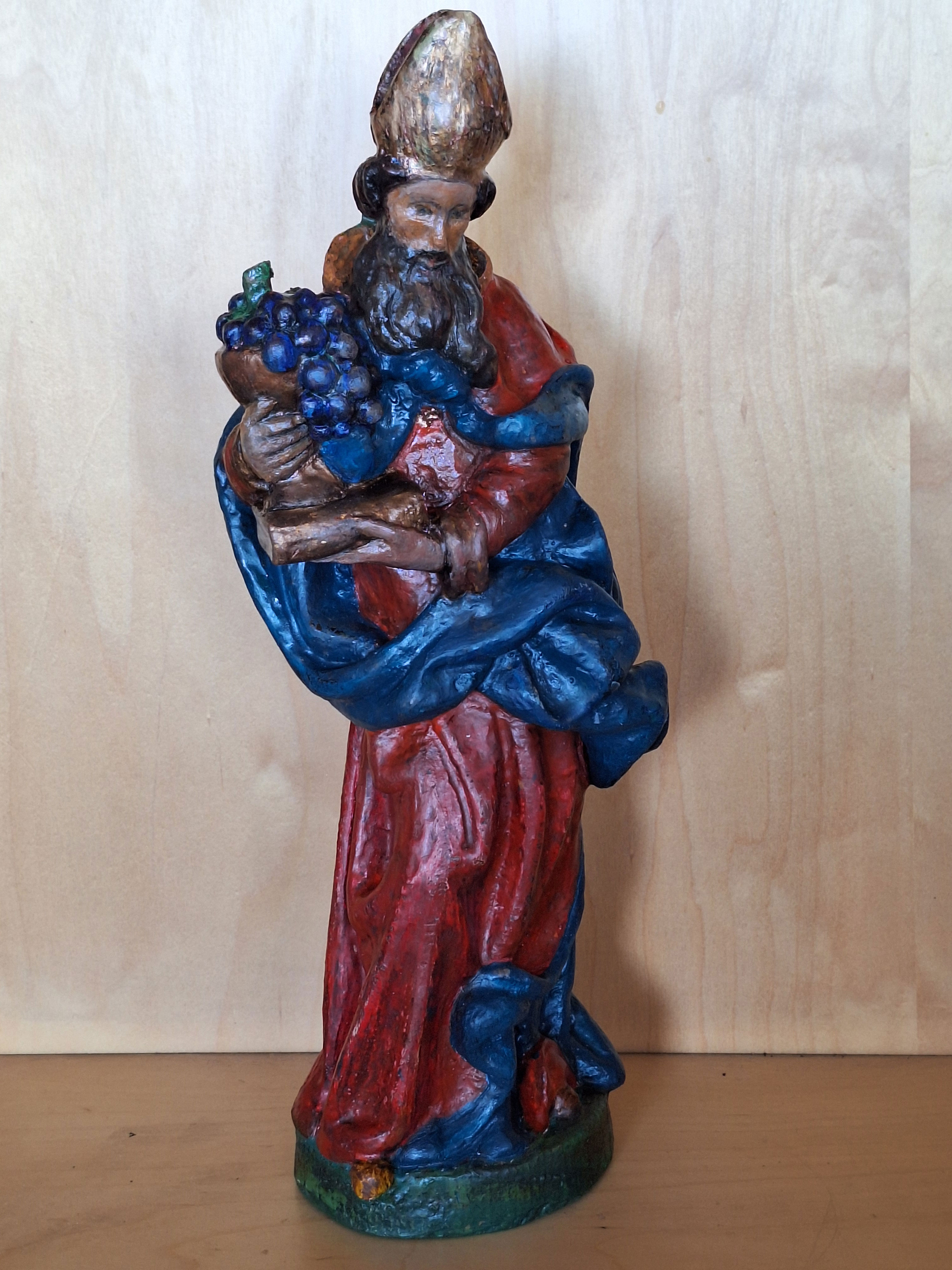
Wooden statue of St. Urban of Langres, 18th century

== Veneration ==
The feast day of Saint Urban is 2 April, or 23 January in Langres, France. The cult of Saint Urban of Langres was closely associated with the weather. Several old German sayings reflect this:

Pankraz und Urban ohne Regen / bringen großen Erntesegen
[The feast days of] Pancras and Urban without rain/ bring big rich harvests.

Pancras, one of the so-called Ice Saints, was a saint closely associated with the weather.

Das Wetter auf St. Urban zeigt des Herbstes Wetter an.
The weather on St. Urban's Day will indicate what the autumn weather will be like.

These are sayings that are similar to those said of the feast days of Swithun, Medardus, Godelieve, and other "weather saints." Another saying ties more closely to Urban's particular patronage of wine growers:

Ist Sonnenschein am Urbanstag / gedeiht der Wein nach alter Sag
If there is sunshine on St. Urban's Day/ the wine thrives afterwards, they say

He is often confused with Pope Urban I, who wears a papal tiara.
