= Eligius =

Eligius may refer to:

- Saint Eligius (c. 588–659), Catholic patron saint of goldsmiths and other metalworkers
- Eligius Pruystinck (died 1544)
- Eligius Fromentin (c. 1767–1822), American politician
- Eligius Franz Joseph von Münch-Bellinghausen (1806–1871), also known as Friedrich Halm, Austrian dramatist, poet and short-story writer
- Eligius Tambornino (born 1986)
