= Severus of Avranches =

Saint Severus of Avranches

Bishop and Abbot
- Born: Cotentin, Normandy, France
- Died: c. 690
- Venerated in: Catholic Church; Eastern Orthodox Church
- Canonized: Pre-Congregation
- Major shrine: Rouen, France
- Feast: 1 February
- Attributes: Bishop with a nearby horse
- Patronage: against fever; against migraine; drapers; fever; hatmakers; hatters; migraine; milliners; silk workers; weavers; wool manufacturers; wool weavers

Severus of Avranches was born to a poor peasant family in France. According to historian Georges Goyau, Severus was a sixth century shepherd, "...who was perhaps Bishop of Avranches"

He was a shepherd in his youth. After joining the priesthood, he rose through the ranks of monk, priest and later abbot. He eventually became bishop of Avranches. It appears that he was dragged by the local clergy from his forest cell to undergo consecration. In his later years, he resigned his bishopric and returned to monastic life.
