= Honoratus of Amiens =

Bishop and Roman Catholic saint

Saint Honoratus (Honorius) of Amiens
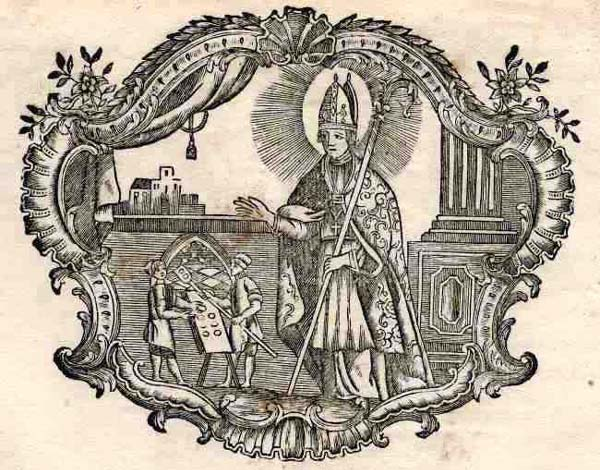

Bishop of Amiens
- Died: c. 600 AD
- Venerated in: Roman Catholic Church; Eastern Orthodox Church
- Feast: 16 May
- Attributes: Baker's peel or shovel; bishop with a large Host; bishop with three Hosts on a baker's shovel; loaves; prelate with a hand reaching from heaven to give him bread for the Mass
- Patronage: Bakers, confectioners, bakers of altar bread, candle-makers, florists, flour merchants, corn chandlers, oil refiners, and pastry chefs

Saint Honoratus of Amiens (Honoré, sometimes Honorius) (died 16 January ca. 600) (Note: Sometimes 653 is given as his date of death due to confusion with Saint Honorius, Archbishop of Canterbury.) was the seventh bishop of Amiens. (Note: The oldest catalogue of Amiens's bishops exists in a late twelfth-century collection of the works of Robert of Torigny (J.S. Ott, "Urban space, memory, and episcopal authority: The bishops of Amiens in peace and conflict, 1073-1164", Viator 31.3, 2000).) His feast day is May 16 (Honoratus of Lérins (c. 350 – 429) was Archbishop of Arles).

== Hagiography ==
Honoratus was born in Port-le-Grand (Ponthieu) near Amiens. Noting his pious inclinations, his family entrusted his education to his predecessor in the bishopric of Amiens, Saint Beatus (Beat). Honoratus resisted being elected bishop of Amiens, believing himself unworthy of this honour.

During his bishopric, he discovered the relics of Victoricus, Fuscian, and Gentian, which had remained hidden for 300 years.

== Legend ==
The Vie de Saint-Honoré was composed towards the end of the 11th century by a canon of Amiens from ancient manuscripts and local legends. According to hagiographic tradition, a ray of light of divine origin descended upon his head upon his election as bishop. There also appeared holy oil of unknown origin on his forehead.

When it was known in his hometown that he had been proclaimed bishop, his nursemaid, who was baking bread for the family, refused to believe that Honoratus had been elevated to such a position. She remarked that she would believe the news only if the peel she had been using to bake bread put down roots and turned itself into a tree. When the peel was placed into the ground, it was transformed into a mulberry tree that gave flowers and fruit. This miraculous tree was still being shown in the sixteenth century.

== Veneration ==
His devotion was widespread in France following reports of numerous miracles when his body was exhumed in 1060.

After his death, his relics were invoked against drought and floods to ensure a good wheat harvest. Bishop Guy, son of Enguerrand I, Count of Ponthieu, ordered that a procession be held, in which an urn holding Honoratus' relics were carried around the walls of the city.

In 1202, a baker named Renold Theriens (Renaud Cherins) donated to the city of Paris some land to build a chapel in honor of the saint. The chapel became one of the richest in Paris, and gave its name to Rue du Faubourg Saint-Honoré.

In 1240, during construction of the cathedral of Amiens, the relics of Honoratus were carried through the surrounding countryside in a quest for funds. (Note: "Such a relic quest is depicted in the tympanum of the south transept" of Amiens, according to Stephen Murray, A Gothic Sermon: Making a Contract with the Mother of God, Saint Mary of Amiens.) A statue of Honoratus stands in the southern portal of Amiens Cathedral.

=== Patronage ===
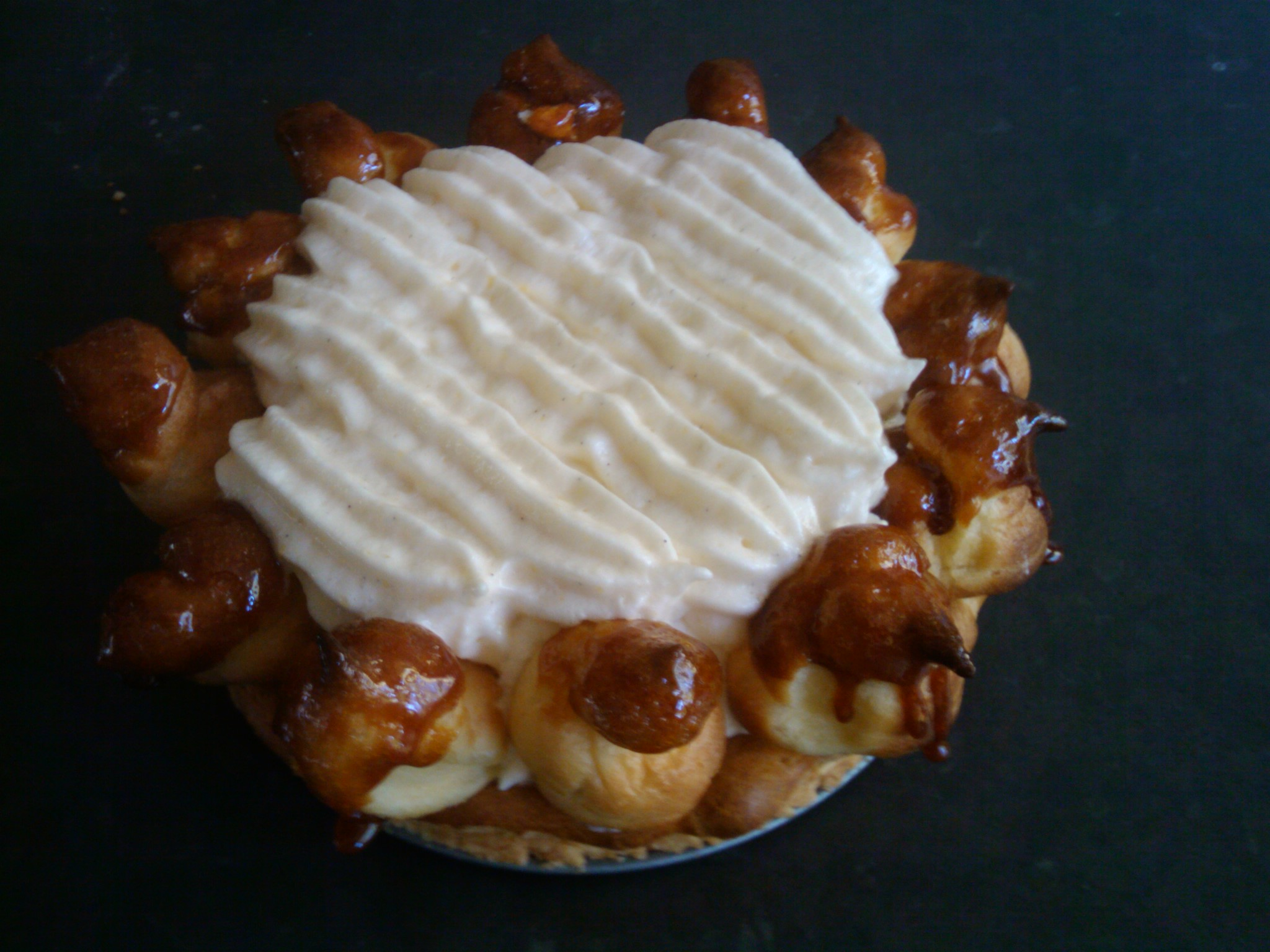
Gâteau Saint-Honoré

Saint Honoré is the patron of a Carthusian establishment at Abbeville, which was founded in 1306.

He is the patron saint of bakers and pastry chefs. In 1400, the bakers of Paris established their guild in the church of Saint Honoratus, celebrating his feast on 16 May. In 1659, Louis XIV ordered that every baker observe the feast of Saint Honoratus, and give donations in honor of the saint and for the benefit of the community. The St. Honoré Cake is named for him.

== Legacy ==
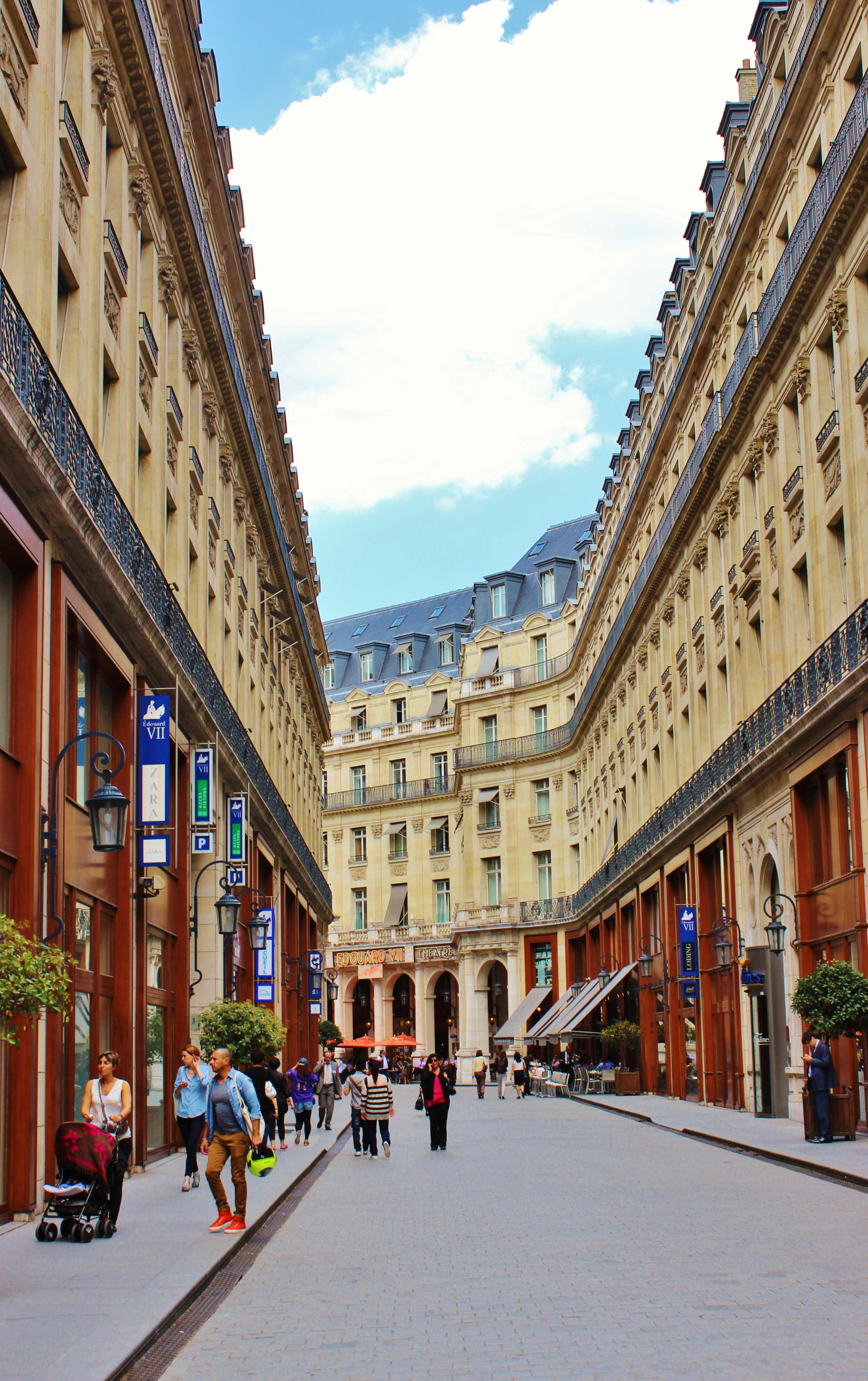
Rue Saint-Honoré, Paris

The former church of Saint-Honoré and the Rue Saint-Honoré in Paris are named after him.
