= Patron saints of places =

In various denominations of Christianity, some deceased Christians are recognized as saints. Some such saints are regarded as patron saints, or heavenly advocates, of certain locations.

== Continents ==
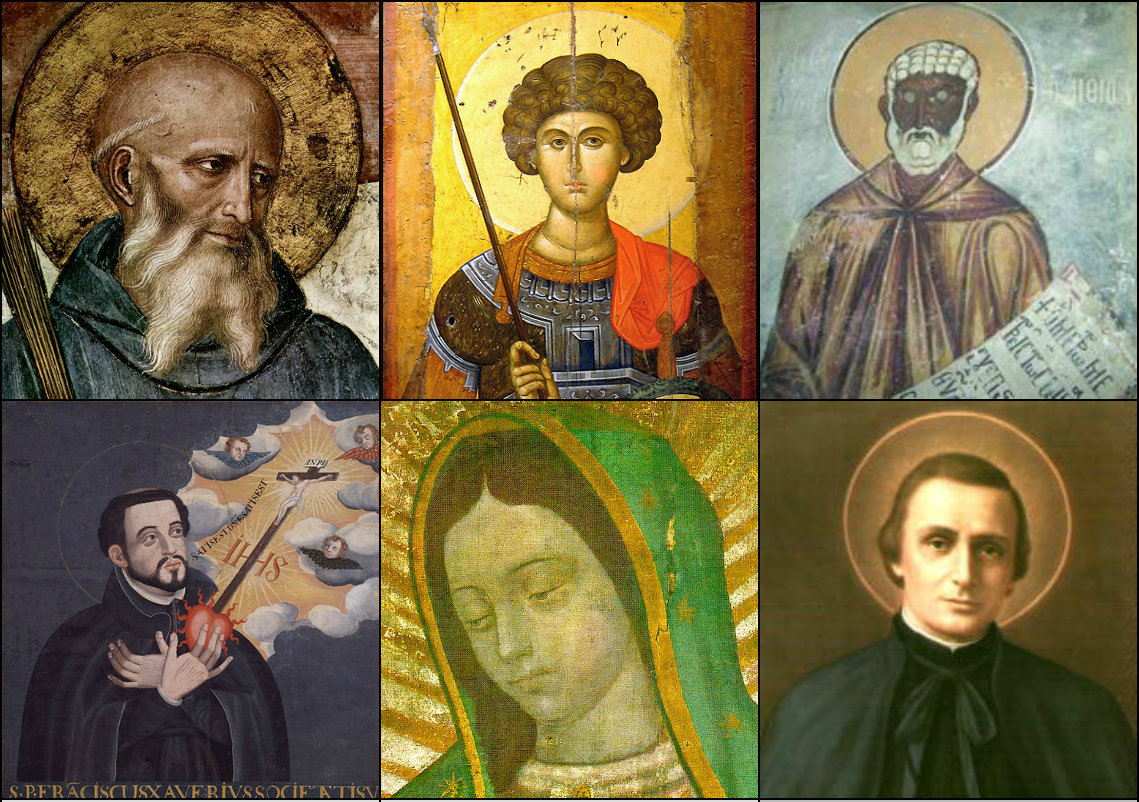
Patron saints by regions

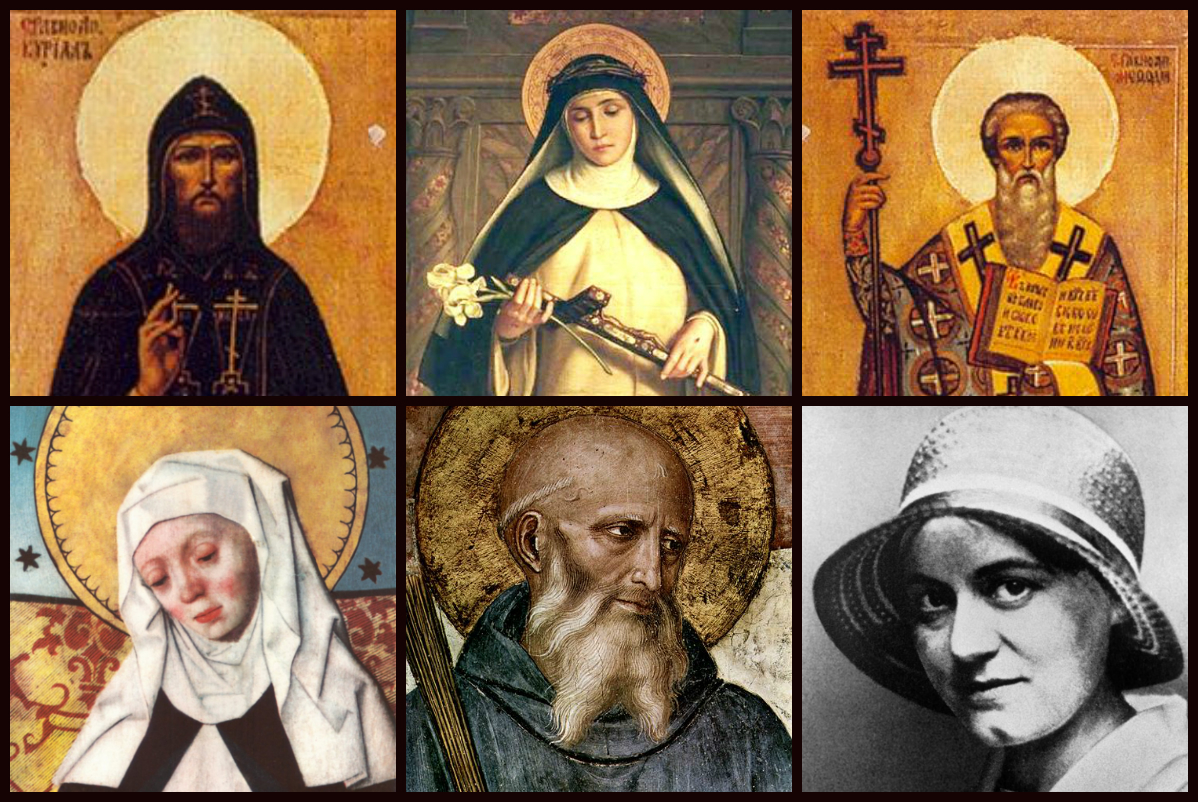
Patron saints of Europe

Continent	Patron saint	Notes
Asia	Francis Xavier	John the Evangelist is the patron saint of Asia Minor, but not the entire continent.
Africa	Moses the Black; Our Lady of Africa	Cyprian is patron saint of Africa, the Roman province (Tunisia), not the entire continent.
The Americas	The Virgin Mary (as Our Lady of Guadalupe); Rose of Lima (Rosa de Lima); Óscar Romero; Herman of Alaska	
Antarctica	The Virgin Mary (as Our Lady of the Snows); John Bosco	
Europe	Benedict of Nursia; Cyril and Methodius; Bridget of Sweden; Catherine of Siena; Edith Stein (Teresa Benedicta of the Cross)	Benedict of Nursia is the main patron saint, the others are considered co-patrons. The Virgin Mary (It is believed the whole of Europe was granted protection under Our Lady of Europe in the 14th century)
Oceania	Saint Paisios of Mount Athos (Australia); Peter Chanel	

== Geographical regions ==
Region	Patron saint
Anatolia	John the Apostle
Australasia	The Virgin Mary (as Mary Help of Christians)
Central Africa	The Immaculate Heart of Mary
Central America	Peter of Saint Joseph de Betancur; Óscar Romero; Rose of Lima
East Indies	Thomas the Apostle
Far East	Francis Xavier
Indies	Rose of Lima
Latin America	The Virgin Mary (as Our Lady of Guadalupe)
North Africa (Libya, Tunisia)	Cyprian
Scandinavia	Ansgar
South America	Rose of Lima
South Asia	Francis Xavier
West Indies	Gertrude the Great; Pope Gregory I

== Countries ==
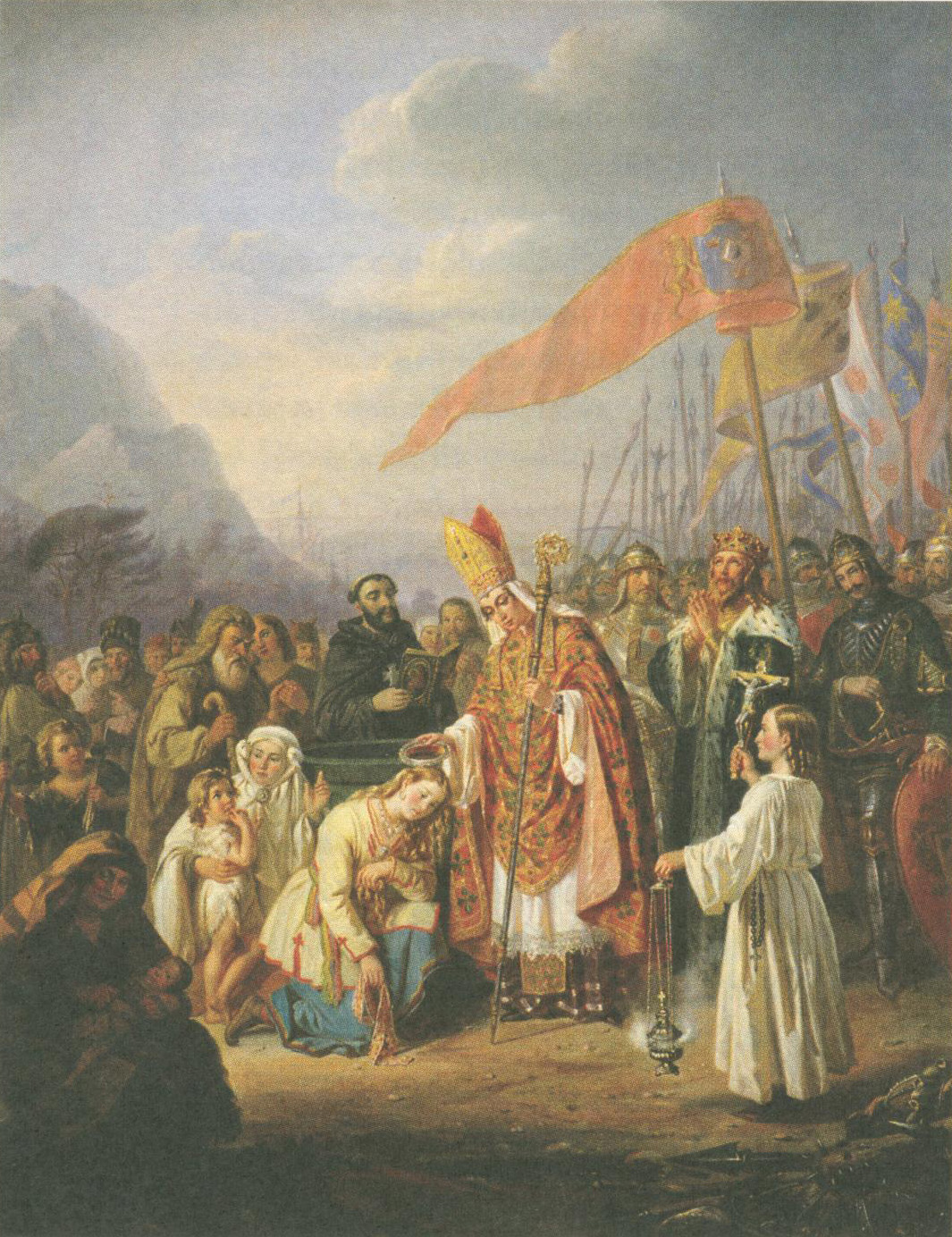
St. Henry the bishop

This list only includes sovereign states. Subdivisions, such as the constituent countries of the United Kingdom, are listed below under "Administrative subdivisions".

Country	Patron saint
Albania	The Virgin Mary (as Our Lady of Good Counsel)
Andorra	The Virgin Mary (as Our Lady of Meritxell)
Angola	The Immaculate Heart of Mary
Argentina	The Virgin Mary (as Our Lady of Luján); Francis Solanus; Laura Vicuña; Martin of Tours
Armenia	Gregory the Illuminator; Bartholomew the Apostle; Jude the Apostle; Mesrop Mashtots
Australia	The Virgin Mary (as Our Lady Help of Christians) Saint Paisios of Mount Athos; Mary of the Cross MacKillop
Austria	Joseph; Colman of Stockerau; Florian; Leopold the Good; Maurice; Severinus of Noricum; Vergilius of Salzburg; The Virgin Mary
Azerbaijan	Bartholomew the Apostle; Elisæus of Albania; The Virgin Mary, Protector of Caucasus; John of Baku
Bahrain	The Virgin Mary (as Our Lady of Arabia)
Bangladesh	Francis Xavier
Barbados	Andrew
Belarus	Cyril of Turov; Euphrosyne of Polotsk
Belgium	Joseph
Belize	George
Bolivia	The Virgin Mary (as Our Lady of Candelaria, Our Lady of Copacabana, and Our Lady of Mount Carmel)
Bosnia and Herzegovina	Elijah
Brazil	Saint Raphael the Archangel (As Protective Angel of the Brazilian Nation) The Virgin Mary (as Our Lady of Aparecida); Peter of Alcantara; Joseph of Anchieta
Brunei	Francis Xavier
Bulgaria	Cyril and Methodius; John of Rila
Cambodia	Joseph
Cameroon	The Blessed Virgin Mary (Immaculate Heart of Mary)
Canada	Jean de Brébeuf; Joseph; Anne; Saint George the Canadian Martyrs; Patrick
Chile	The Virgin Mary (as Our Lady of Mount Carmel); James the Greater; Teresa of Los Andes
China	The Virgin Mary (as Our Lady of Sheshan); Joseph; Francis Xavier; Chinese Martyrs
Colombia	The Virgin Mary (as Our Lady of the Rosary of Chiquinquirá); Louis Bertrand; Peter Claver; Laura of Saint Catherine of Siena
Costa Rica	The Virgin Mary (as Virgen de los Ángeles, also known as La Negrita)
Croatia	Joseph (by the decision of the Croatian Parliament from 1687 he is the official patron saint of Croatia); Jerome; Cyril and Methodius
Cuba	The Virgin Mary (as Our Lady of Charity)
Cyprus	Barnabas; Lazarus; Marina the Martyr
Czech Republic	Adalbert of Prague; Agnes of Bohemia; John of Nepomuk; Ludmila; Cyril and Methodius; Procopius; Sigismund; Wenceslaus; Vitus
Democratic Republic of Congo	The Virgin Mary (as Our Lady of the Immaculate Conception); Joseph
Denmark	Ansgar; Canute IV
Dominican Republic	The Virgin Mary (as Our Lady of Altagracia and Our Lady of Mercy); Dominic
East Timor	Our Lady of Immaculate
Ecuador	The Sacred Heart of Jesus; The Immaculate Heart of Mary; Mary Anne de Paredes (Spanish: Mariana de Paredes y Flores); Our Lady of El Cisne
Egypt	Mark the Evangelist; Maurice
El Salvador	The Virgin Mary (as Our Lady of Peace); The Transfigured Jesus (the Divine Savior of the World)
Equatorial Guinea	The Virgin Mary (as Our Lady of the Immaculate Conception); The Transfiguration of Jesus (as the Divine Savior of the World)
Ethiopia	Frumentius; George
Faroe Islands	Olav the Holy
Fiji	Peter
Finland	Henry of Uppsala
France	The Virgin Mary (as Our Lady of the Assumption); The Archangel Michael; Denis of Paris; Martin of Tours; Louis IX; Joan of Arc; Remi; Thérèse de Lisieux; Petronilla; Radegund; Maurice
Georgia	George; Nino
Germany	Adalbert of Magdeburg; Ansgar; Boniface; Bruno of Cologne; Peter Canisius; Kilian of Würzburg; The Archangel Michael; Suitbert of Kaiserswerdt; George; Maurice
Greece	The Virgin Mary (as the Panagia); George; Andrew; Nicholas of Myra; Paul the Apostle
Greenland	Hans Egede
Guam	The Virgin Mary (as Our Lady of Camarin)
Guatemala	The Virgin Mary (as Our Lady of Rosary); James the Greater; Peter of Saint Joseph de Betancur
Haiti	The Virgin Mary (as Our Lady of Perpetual Succor)
Honduras	The Virgin Mary (as Our Lady of Suyapa)
Hong Kong	The Virgin Mary (as Our Lady of the Immaculate Conception); Joseph; Francis Xavier; Chinese Martyrs
Hungary	The Virgin Mary; Adalbert of Prague; Astricus; Emeric of Hungary (Hungarian: Imre); Cyril; Gerard Sagredo; Stephen of Hungary; Elizabeth of Hungary
Iceland	Ansgar; Thorlac Thorhallsson
India	The Blessed Virgin Mary (Our Lady of the Assumption); Thomas the Apostle; Francis Xavier
Indonesia	The Blessed Virgin Mary (Our Lady of Perpetual Help); Joseph; Thomas; Francis Xavier
Iran	Maruthas; Joseph
Ireland	Patrick; Columba; Brigid of Kildare
Italy	Catherine of Siena; Francis of Assisi; Maurice
Jamaica	The Virgin Mary (as Our Lady of the Assumption); George
Japan	Peter Baptist; Joseph; Francis Xavier; Our Lady of Akita
Jordan	John the Baptist
Kenya	The Virgin Mary (as Mary, Queen of Love); George
Korea	The Virgin Mary (as Our Lady of the Immaculate Conception); Joseph; Andrew Kim Taegon; Paul Chong Hasang; Korean Martyrs
Kuwait	The Virgin Mary (as Our Lady of Arabia)
Latvia	George
Lebanon	The Virgin Mary (as Our Lady of Lebanon); Saint Maron Barbara; Charbel Makhlouf
Lesotho	The Immaculate Heart of Mary
Lithuania	Casimir; George
Luxembourg	Cunigunde of Luxemburg; Willibrord
Macau	The Virgin Mary (as Our Lady of the Immaculate Conception); John the Baptist; Joseph; Francis Xavier; Catherine of Siena
Madagascar	Vincent de Paul
Malaysia	Francis Xavier; George
Malta	The Virgin Mary (as Our Lady of the Assumption and Our Lady of Victories); Paul the Apostle; Agatha of Sicily; Publius; George (patron saint of Gozo, one of the Maltese islands); Ursula (patroness saint of Gozo since the 17th century, the second largest island in the Maltese Archipelago)
Mauritius	Louis IX of France
Mexico	The Virgin Mary (as Our Lady of Guadalupe); Philip of Jesus; Joseph
Moldova	George
Monaco	Devota
Mozambique	Immaculate Conception
Netherlands	Plechelm; Willibrord
New Caledonia	The Virgin Mary (as Our Lady of the Assumption)
New Zealand	The Virgin Mary (as Our Lady of the Assumption); Joseph Peter Chanel; George; Andrew; Patrick
Nicaragua	James the Greater; The Virgin Mary (as Our Lady of the Immaculate Conception)
Nigeria	Patrick
North Macedonia	Clement of Ohrid; Cyril and Methodius
Norway	Olaf II (known as Rex Perpetuus Norvegiae); Magnus of Orkney
Pakistan	Francis Xavier; George
State of Palestine	The Virgin Mary (as Our Lady, Queen of Palestine); George
Panama	The Virgin Mary (as Our Lady of the Antigua)
Papua New Guinea	The Archangel Michael; Andrew; George; Joseph
Paraguay	The Virgin Mary (as Our Lady of Caacupé); Martin of Tours
Peru	Rose of Lima; Turibius of Mogroveio; Joseph
Philippines	The Virgin Mary (as: Our Lady of the Immaculate Conception; Our Lady of Guadalupe; Our Lady of La Naval de Manila; Mary, Help of Christians; Our Lady of Perpetual Help and her Immaculate Heart); Lorenzo Ruíz; Pedro Calungsod; Pudentiana; Rose of Lima; Santo Niño de Cebú
Poland	The Virgin Mary (as The Most Holy Virgin Mary, Queen of Poland and Our Lady of Częstochowa); Adalbert of Prague; Stanislaus of Cracow; Stanislaus Kostka; Andrew Bobola; Jadwiga of Poland; Casimir; Hyacinth; Kinga of Poland; John of Kanty; Florian; Wenceslaus; John of Dukla; Hedwig of Silesia; Pope John Paul II
Portugal	The Virgin Mary (as Our Lady of the Immaculate Conception); Anthony of Padua; The Guardian Angel of Portugal; George
Romania	Virgin Mary; Andrew; Stephen the Great; George; Parascheva; John the New of Suceava
Russia	The Virgin Mary (as Our Lady Derzhavnaya); Alexander Nevsky; Andrew; Basil the Great; Casimir; George; Joseph; Vladimir I of Kiev; Boris and Gleb; Sergius of Radonezh; Thérèse of Lisieux
Rwanda	Christ the King; Andrew; Joseph
San Marino	Marinus; Nicholas of Myra; Agatha
Serbia	Sava; Cyril and Methodius
Singapore	Francis Xavier; Joseph; Anna Wang
Slovakia	The Virgin Mary (as Our Lady of Sorrows); Cyril and Methodius
Slovenia	Joseph; Cyril and Methodius
Solomon Islands	The Archangel Michael
South Africa	George; Martin of Tours
South Sudan	Josephine Bakhita
Spain	The Virgin Mary (as Our Lady of the Immaculate Conception); James the Greater; Teresa of Ávila
Sri Lanka	Francis Xavier; Lawrence; Joseph Vaz; Thomas the Apostle; The Virgin Mary (as Our Lady of Lanka and Our Lady of Madhu); George
Sudan	Josephine Bakhita
Sweden	Bridget of Sweden; Eric IX; Sigfrid of Sweden
Switzerland	Gall; Nicholas of Flue
Syria	Barbara
Taiwan	The Virgin Mary (as Our Lady of the Immaculate Conception); Joseph; Anna Wang
Tanzania	The Virgin Mary (as Our Lady of the Immaculate Conception); George
Thailand	The Virgin Mary (as Our Lady of the Assumption); Joseph
Tunisia	Cyprian of Carthage
Turkey	John the Apostle; George
Uganda	Uganda Martyrs; The Virgin Mary (as Our Lady of Africa)
Ukraine	Andrew; George; Vladimir I of Kiev; The Virgin Mary (as Protecting Veil of the Theotokos)
Uruguay	The Virgin Mary (as Our Lady of the Thirty-Three); James the Less; Philip the Apostle
United States	The Virgin Mary (as Mary of the Immaculate Conception); The Archangel Michael; George; Andrew; Patrick
Venezuela	The Virgin Mary (as Our Lady of Coromoto)
Vietnam	Joseph; Vietnamese Martyrs

=== Former countries ===
Country	Patron saint
Crown of Aragon (kingdoms of Aragon, Mallorca and Valencia, and Principality of Catalonia)	Saint George
Kingdom of Bosnia	Gregory the Miracle-Worker
Duchy of Burgundy	Andrew the Apostle
Czechoslovakia	Adalbert of Prague; John of Nepomuk; Ludmila; Cyril and Methodius; Wenceslaus
Medieval Livonia	Theotokos
Duchy of Lorraine	Nicholas of Myra
Prussia	Adalbert of Prague; Dorothy of Montau; Jutta of Kulmsee; Andrew the Apostle
Moldavia	John the New of Suceava
Kingdom of Serbia	Vitus
Empire of Trebizond	Eugenios of Trebizond
Kingdom of Yugoslavia	Cyril and Methodius
Republic of Genoa	Saint George
Duchy of Milan	Saint Ambrose
Republic of Venice	Saint Mark; Theodore
Republic of Ragusa	Saint Blaise
Holy Roman Empire	Maurice

== Administrative subdivisions ==
Note: Patron saints are likely to be related to fixed traditional regions, and not to the changing boundaries of administrative subdivisions.

Country	Subdivision	Patron saint(s)
Argentina	Buenos Aires	Martin of Tours
Argentina	Buenos Aires Province	Our Lady of the Rosary; Gervasius and Protasius; Mary Help of Christians; Rita of Cascia; Isidore the Laborer; Virgin of Mercy; Pope Pontian; Black Virgin of Oropa; Mary Magdalene; Joseph; Our Lady of Lourdes; Gabriel; Our Lady of the Pillar; Peter
Argentina	Córdoba	Jerome
Argentina	Corrientes	Our Lady of Itatí
Argentina	Misiones	Joseph
Argentina	San Luis	Louis IX of France
Argentina	Santa Fe	Lawrence, Virgin of Mercy, Saint George, Saint Roch, John the Baptist, Our Lady of Itatí, Sacred Heart, Our Lady of the Rosary, Jerome
Argentina	Tucumán	Isidore the Laborer
Argentina	Santa Cruz	Mary (as Virgin of the Valley), Our Lady of the Rosary, Mary Help of Christians
Argentina	Chubut	Our Lady of Guadalupe
Argentina	(La Rioja Province, Argentina) La Rioja	Nicholas of Bari
Austria
Austria	Upper Austria	Florian
Austria	Styria	Joseph
Austria	Carinthia	Joseph
Belgium	Hainaut	Waltrude
Belgium	Flanders	Lutgardis, Amandus
Bosnia and Herzegovina	Republic of Srpska	Stephen
Brazil
Brazil	Acre	Mary (as Our Lady of Immaculate Conception)
Brazil	Alagoas	Mary (as Our Lady of Joy)
Brazil	Amapá	Joseph
Brazil	Amazonas	Mary (as Our Lady of Immaculate Conception)
Brazil	Bahia	Mary (as Our Lady of Immaculate Conception)
Brazil	Ceará	Joseph
Brazil	Distrito Federal	John Bosco
Brazil	Espírito Santo	Holy Spirit
Brazil	Goiás	Mary ( as Our Lady of Abadia)
Brazil	Maranhão	Saint Joseph (as Saint Joseph of Ribamar)
Brazil	Mato Grosso	Jesus Christ (as Our Lord, the Good Jesus)
Brazil	Mato Grosso do Sul	Mary, as Our Lady of the Abbey
Brazil	Minas Gerais	Mary (as Our Lady of Piety)
Brazil	Pará	Mary (as Our Lady of Nazareth)
Brazil	Paraíba	Mary (as Our Lady of Snows)
Brazil	Paraná	Mary (as Our Lady of Rocio)
Brazil	Pernambuco	Mary (as Our Lady of Mount Carmel)
Brazil	Piauí	Mary (as Our Lady of Victory)
Brazil	Rio de Janeiro	Sebastian
Brazil	Rio Grande do Norte	Saint Martyrs of Cunhaú and Uruaçu
Brazil	Rio Grande do Sul	Peter
Brazil	Rondônia	Mary (as Our Lady of Nazareth)
Brazil	Roraima	Mary (as Our Lady of Mount Carmel)
Brazil	Santa Catarina	Catherine of Alexandria
Brazil	São Paulo	Paul
Brazil	Sergipe	Mary (as Our Lady of Immaculate Conception)
Brazil	Tocantins	Mary (as Our Lady of Nativity)
Canada	Newfoundland and Labrador	John the Baptist
Canada	Nova Scotia	Ninian
Canada	Quebec	Anne; John the Baptist
Croatia	Dalmatia	Blaise
Czech Republic	Bohemia	Wenceslaus, Ludmila, Vitus, Adalbert of Prague, Agnes of Bohemia, Procopius, Sigismund of Burgundy, Norbert of Xanten, Joseph, John of Nepomuk
Czech Republic	Moravia	Cyril and Methodius, Wenceslaus, Jan Sarkander
France	Alsace	Odile of Alsace
France	Auvergne	Gerald Aurillac
France	Brittany	Dedicated: Anna, Ivo of Kermartin; Seven Founders: Corentin of Cornwall; Tudwal of Landreger; Pol-Aorelian of Leon, Padarn of Gwened; Samson of Dol; Brioc; Malo.
France	Corsica	Julia of Corsica, Devota, Alexander Sauli
France	Île-de-France (Paris)	Denis, Genevieve
France	Lorraine	Saint Nicholas, Joan of Arc
France	Northern Catalonia	George, Saint John
Germany	Bavaria	St. Mary Patroness of Bavaria (feast on 1 May); St. Rupert and St. Emmeram (Bavaria proper); St. Kilian and St. Sebaldus (Franconia); St. Hedwig of Andechs
Germany	Saxony	Willehad of Bremen
Greece	Aegina	Saint Nectarios
Greece	Cephalonia	Saint Gerasimos
Greece	Chios	Saint Markella
Greece	Crete	Saint Titus
Greece	Corfu	Saint Spyridon, Saint Arsenius of Corfu
Greece	Euboea	Saint Paraskevi
Greece	Laconia	Saint Nikon the Metanoeite
Greece	Patmos	Saint John the Theologian
Greece	Rhodes	Saint Phanourios
Greece	Skyros	Saint George
Greece	Tinos	Saint Pelagia, Mary (as Our Lady of Tinos)
Greece	Zakynthos	Saint Dionysios of Zakynthos
Indonesia	Borneo	Francis Xavier
Italy	Cremona	Homobonus
Italy	Lombardy	Charles Borromeo
Italy	Piedmont	Saint Maurice
Italy	Sicily	Andrew Avellino, Nicholas of Myra, Rosalia
Kenya	Nyeri	Irene Stefani
Lebanon	North Lebanon	Awtel
Lebanon	South Lebanon	Christina of Bolsena
Malaysia	Penang	Anne; Francis Xavier
Malaysia	Malacca	Francis Xavier
Malaysia	Sabah; Labuan	Joseph; Mary (Our Lady of Mount Kinabalu)
Malaysia	Sarawak	Joseph
Mexico	Chihuahua	Our Lady of La Soledad de Parral
Mexico	Veracruz	Rafael Guizar y Valencia
Philippines	Albay	Mary (Our Lady of Salvation)
Philippines	Batangas	Saint Joseph, Our Lady of Caysasay
Philippines	Bicol (region)	Mary (as Our Lady of Peñafrancia)
Philippines	Cagayan	Mary (Our Lady of Piat)
Philippines	Laguna	James the Apostle
Philippines	Pampanga	Mary (as Virgen de los Remedios)
Philippines	Quezon	Isidore the Laborer
Philippines	Rizal	Mary (Our Lady of Peace and Good Voyage), Clement of Rome
Philippines	Western Visayas (region)	Mary (as Our Lady of Candelaria)
Portugal	Lisbon	Saint Vincent, Saint Anthony, Mary (as Saint Mary Major)
Portugal	Oporto	Mary (as Nossa Senhora de Vandoma, Our Lady of Assumption), Saint John
Portugal	Coimbra	Saint Augustine, Saint Elizabeth, Thomas of Villanova
Portugal	Braga	Saint Martin of Braga, Saint Gerald, Mary (as Our Lady of Assumption), Saint John
Russia	Kaliningrad Oblast	Adalbert of Prague
Serbia	Vojvodina	Cyril and Methodius
Spain	Andalusia	John of Avila, Virgin of Hope of Macarena
Spain	Aragon	Our Lady of the Pillar, Agathoclia, Braulio, George
Spain	Asturias	Our Lady of Covadonga
Spain	Castile	Emilian of Cogolla
Spain	Canary Islands	Our Lady of Candelaria, Peter of Saint Joseph de Betancur
Spain	Cantabria	Our Lady of Aparecida,
Spain	Catalonia	George, Virgin of Montserrat
Spain	Ceuta	Our Lady of Africa
Spain	Euskadi	Saint Ignatius of Loyola, Saint Prudentius
Spain	Extremadura	Our Lady of Guadalupe in Extremadura, John the Baptist
Spain	Galicia	James the Greater
Spain	La Rioja	Our Lady of Valvanera
Spain	Leonese Country	Marcellus of Tangier
Spain	Madrid	Isidore the Laborer, Virgin of Almudena
Spain	Navarre	Fermin, Francis Xavier, Saturnin, Santa María the Royal of Pamplona, Raymond of Penyafort
Spain	Valencia	Vincent Ferrer, Our Lady of the Forsaken
United Kingdom †Crown dependencies	England	George; Gregory the Great; Augustine of Canterbury; Edmund the Martyr; Edward the Confessor; Michael the Archangel; Our Lady of Walsingham
United Kingdom †Crown dependencies	Berkshire	Birinus
United Kingdom †Crown dependencies	Cornwall	Piran, Michael the Archangel, Petroc
United Kingdom †Crown dependencies	Cumbria	Bega
United Kingdom †Crown dependencies	Devon	Boniface
United Kingdom †Crown dependencies	Dorset	Wite
United Kingdom †Crown dependencies	East Anglia	Edmund the Martyr; Suffolk
United Kingdom †Crown dependencies	Essex	Cedd
United Kingdom †Crown dependencies	The English Fens	Guthlac
United Kingdom †Crown dependencies	Herefordshire	Dubricius
United Kingdom †Crown dependencies	Kent	Augustine of Canterbury
United Kingdom †Crown dependencies	London	Saint Paul
United Kingdom †Crown dependencies	Mercia	Chad of Mercia, Bertelin, Alban
United Kingdom †Crown dependencies	Northumbria	Cuthbert of Lindisfarne, Oswald
United Kingdom †Crown dependencies	Sussex	Richard of Chichester, Wilfrid
United Kingdom †Crown dependencies	Wessex	Aldhelm, Swithun
United Kingdom †Crown dependencies	West Riding of Yorkshire	Wilfrid
United Kingdom †Crown dependencies	Wiltshire	Osmund
United Kingdom †Crown dependencies	Northern Ireland	Saint Patrick (also see Ireland (above))
United Kingdom †Crown dependencies	Scotland	Andrew the Apostle, Margaret of Scotland, Columba, Palladius
United Kingdom †Crown dependencies	Barra	Finbarr
United Kingdom †Crown dependencies	Eigg	Donnán
United Kingdom †Crown dependencies	Galloway	Ninian
United Kingdom †Crown dependencies	Lennox	Kessog
United Kingdom †Crown dependencies	Orkney	Magnus
United Kingdom †Crown dependencies	Wales	David
United Kingdom †Crown dependencies	Gibraltar (territory)	Bernard of Clairvaux, Mary (as Our Lady of Europe)
United Kingdom †Crown dependencies	Guernsey†	Samson of Dol
United Kingdom †Crown dependencies	Isle of Man†	Maughold
United Kingdom †Crown dependencies	Jersey†	Helier
United States	Alabama	Our Lady of the Gulf
United States	Alaska	St. Herman of Alaska, St. Thérèse of Lisieux, Our Lady of the Kodiak and the Islands
United States	Arizona	Our Lady of the Highways
United States	Arkansas	Our Lady of the Holy Souls
United States	California	St. Junipero Serra, Our Lady of the Refuge, Our Lady of the Wayside
United States	Colorado	St. Francis of Assisi, Our Lady of the Immaculate Conception
United States	Connecticut	Notre Dame of Easton
United States	Delaware	Our Lady of Mercy
United States	Florida	Our Lady of La Leche
United States	Georgia	Immaculate Heart of Mary
United States	Hawaii	Father Damien, St. Marianne Cope, Our Lady, Star of the Sea, Our Lady Queen of Peace
United States	Idaho	Our Lady of Limerick
United States	Illinois	Our Lady of the Universe
United States	Indiana	St. Théodore Guérin, Our Lady of Providence
United States	Iowa	Mary of Nazareth
United States	Kansas	Mary Queen of Angels
United States	Kentucky	Mary Mother of God
United States	Louisiana	Our Lady of Prompt Succor
United States	Maine	Our Lady of Peace
United States	Maryland	St. Elizabeth Ann Seton, Our Lady of the Assumption
United States	Massachusetts	St. Patrick, Our Lady of the Incarnation
United States	Michigan	Our Lady Gate of Heaven
United States	Minnesota	Our Lady Mother of the Church
United States	Mississippi	Our Lady of Sorrows
United States	Missouri	Our Lady of Calvary
United States	Montana	Our Lady of the Pines
United States	Nebraska	Our Lady of the Presentation
United States	Nevada	Our Lady of Las Vegas
United States	New Hampshire	Our Lady of Perpetual Help
United States	New Jersey	Our Lady of Fatima
United States	New Mexico	Our Lady of Guadalupe
United States	New York	St. Nicholas, Our Lady Help of Christians
United States	North Carolina	Our Lady of the Holy Rosary
United States	North Dakota	Mary Queen of Peace
United States	Ohio	Our Lady of Consolation
United States	Oklahoma	Our Lady, Queen of all Saints
United States	Oregon	Our Lady of the Woods
United States	Pennsylvania	Our Lady of the Miraculous Medal
United States	Puerto Rico	Our Lady of Providence
United States	Rhode Island	Our Lady of Mount Carmel
United States	South Carolina	Mary the Virgin Mother
United States	South Dakota	Our Lady of the Prairie
United States	Tennessee	Our Lady of Lourdes
United States	Texas	Our Lady of the Annunciation
United States	Utah	Our Lady of the Snows
United States	Vermont	Our Lady of Grace
United States	Virginia	Our Lady Queen of the Apostles
United States	Washington	Our Lady of Good Help
United States	West Virginia	Our Lady of Victory
United States	Wisconsin	Our Lady of the Americas
United States	Wyoming	Our Lady of the Valley

== Cities and towns ==
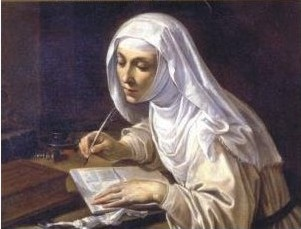
Catherine of Siena writing

=== Argentina ===
- Junín – Ignatius of Loyola
- Mar del Plata – Cecilia

=== Australia ===
- Brisbane – Mary MacKillop
- Melbourne – Patrick
- Sydney – Mary MacKillop

=== Austria ===
- Graz – Giles
- Linz – Florian
- Salzburg – Rupert of Salzburg, Vergilius
- Vienna – Clemens Maria Hofbauer

=== Azerbaijan ===
- Baku – Bartholomew the Apostle

=== Bangladesh ===
- Dinajpur – Francis Xavier

=== Belgium ===
- Affligem – Michael
- Anderlecht – Guy of Anderlecht
- Antwerp – Walburga
- Brecht – Michael
- Bruges – Andrew the Apostle
- Brussels – Gudula, Michael
- Ghent – Bavo, Macarius of Antioch, Pharaildis
- Lier – Gummarus
- Mons – Waltrude
- Oudenarde – Walburga
- Temse – Amalberga

=== Bosnia and Herzegovina ===
- Grude – St. Catherine of Alexandria

=== Brazil ===
- Arraial do Cabo – Virgin of Los Remedios
- Brasília – John Bosco
- Belo Horizonte – Our Lady of Good Voyage, Ignatius of Loyola
- Florianópolis – Catherine of Alexandria
- Fortaleza – Our Lady of Assumption
- Niterói – John the Baptist
- Ouro Preto – Our Lady of the Pillar
- Paraty – Virgin of Los Remedios
- Ribeirão Preto – Sebastian
- Rio de Janeiro – Sebastian
- São Gonçalo do Sapucaí – Gundisalvus of Amarante
- São João del-Rei – Our Lady of the Pillar
- São Paulo – Paul the Apostle
- São Thomé das Letras – Thomas the Apostle
- Tiradentes – Anthony of Padua
- Ubatuba – Our Lady of the Conception
- Vitória – Our Lady of Victory

=== Canada ===
- Calgary – Demetrios
- Deschambault, Quebec – Joseph
- Halifax – John the Baptist
- Montreal – Mary
- Ottawa – Humbert of Maroilles
- St. John's, Newfoundland and Labrador – John the Baptist
- Toronto – Michael
- Vancouver – Our Lady of the Rosary
- Winnipeg – Boniface

=== Colombia ===
- Barranquilla – Nicholas of Tolentino, Saint Roch
- Bogotá – Elizabeth of Hungary
- Bucaramanga – Immaculate Conception
- Buenaventura – Bonaventure
- Cali – James the Greater
- Cartagena – Peter Claver
- Cúcuta – Saint Joseph
- El Guamo – Saint Lucy
- Envigado – Gertrude the Great
- Ibagué – Saint Boniface
- Ipiales – Our Lady of Las Lajas
- Medellín – Virgin of Candelaria and Lawrence of Rome
- Mocoa – Michael
- Montería – Jerome
- Neiva – Immaculate Conception
- Pasto – Virgin of Mercy and John the Baptist
- Santa Fe de Antioquia – Saint Barbara
- Santa Marta – Martha
- Soacha – Bernardino of Siena
- Tunja – James the Greater

=== Croatia ===
- Dubrovnik – Blaise
- Losinj – Gaudentius of Ossero
- Rab – Christopher
- Rijeka – Vitus
- Šibenik – Michael
- Sisak – Quirinus
- Split – Duje
- Zadar – St. Chrysogonus
- Zagreb – Mary, Francis Xavier

=== Cuba ===
- Caraballo – Paul the Apostle's Conversion
- Havana, Cuba – Christopher

=== Czech Republic ===
- Brandýs nad Labem-Stará Boleslav – Wenceslaus
- Březnice – Vitus
- Brušperk – George
- Brno – Saint Primitivus and Saint Constantius
- Česká Lípa – Peter and Paul
- České Budějovice – Saint Auratianus
- Český Brod – Gotthard of Hildesheim
- Český Těšín – Melchior Grodziecki
- Chomutov – Michael
- Davle – John the Baptist
- Dobřany – Vitus
- Frenštát pod Radhoštěm – Martin of Tours
- Hradec Králové – Clement of Rome
- Husinec – Nicholas
- Jindřichův Hradec – Hippolytus of Rome
- Jiřetín pod Jedlovou – George
- Moravský Krumlov – Florian
- Nepomuk – John of Nepomuk
- Olomouc – Paulina of Rome
- Písek – Pope Pius V
- Plzeň – Bartholomew
- Polná – Saint Ligorius
- Prague – John of Nepomuk, Wenceslaus
- Sázava – Procopius of Sázava

=== Denmark ===
- Odense – Saint Alban
- Slagelse – Michael
- Aarhus – Saint Clement of Rome

=== Ecuador ===
- Guayaquil – James the Greater
- Loja – Sebastian
- Quito – Francis of Assisi

=== Egypt ===
- Alexandria – Cyril of Alexandria

=== France ===
- Abbeville – Wulfram of Sens
- Albi – Cecilia
- Autun – Symphorian
- Avignon – Agricola of Avignon, Benezet
- Baume-les-Messieurs, Fleury-sur-Loire – Drogo
- Besançon – Ferreolus and Ferrutio
- Dijon – Benignus of Dijon, Urban of Langres
- Saint-Fiacre – Fiacre
- Gap, Hautes-Alpes – Arnulph
- Limoges – Martial
- Lourdes – Bernadette of Lourdes
- Orléans – Joan of Arc
- Paris – Denis, Genevieve
- Ploërmel – Saint Armel
- Plourin – Budoc
- Saint-Sève – Severus of Vienne
- Toulouse – Saturnin
- Tours – Gatianus of Tours, Martin of Tours
- Vannes – Paternus

=== Germany ===
- Aachen – Mary, Matthias
- Augsburg – Afra, Ulric
- Berlin – Saint Peter, Otto of Bamberg, Hedwig of Silesia
- Bonn – Cassius of Narni, Adelaide
- Bremen – Oscar
- Brunswick – Andrew, Auctor, Blaise, Christopher
- Cologne – Cunibert, Ursula
- Dresden – Benno
- Düsseldorf – Apollinaris of Ravenna
- Dormagen – Michael
- Hamburg – Oscar
- Hanover – Matthias
- Frankfurt am Main – Helen
- Freiburg im Breisgau – George
- Freising – Francis Xavier
- Koblenz – Mary
- Konstanz – Pelagius of Constance
- Lübeck – Nicholas
- Mainz – Alban of Mainz, Boniface
- Munich – Benno
- Münster – Ludger of Utrecht
- Nuremberg – Sebaldus
- Regensburg – Wolfgang, Emmeram
- Stuttgart – Christopher
- Trier – Maximinus, Peter
- Würzburg – Burchard of Würzburg
- Zeitz – Michael

=== Greece ===
- Agios Nikolaos, Crete – Nicholas
- Athens – Dionysius the Areopagite
- Cephallonia – Gerasimus of Cephallonia
- Corfu – Arsenius of Corfu, Spyridon
- Corinth – Dionysius of Corinth
- Giannitsa – St. Peter and St. Paul
- Heraklion – Menas
- Katerini – St. Catherine of Alexandria
- Larissa – Achillius of Larissa
- Lefkada – Spyridon
- Patras – Andrew
- Piraeus – Spyridon
- Skiathos – Mary
- Skopelos – Riginos
- Sparta – Nikon the Metanoeite
- Syros – Nicholas
- Thessaloniki – Demetrius of Thessaloniki
- Tinos – Pelagia
- Zakynthos – Dionysios of Zakynthos

=== Haiti ===
- Port-au-Prince – Our Lady of the Assumption
- Cap-Haïtien – Our Lady of the Assumption
- Les Cayes – Our Lady of the Assumption
- Jacmel – James the Less, Philip the Apostle

=== Honduras ===
- Tegucigalpa – Theophilus of Antioch

=== Hungary ===
- Baja – Anthony of Padua
- Buda – Francis Xavier
- Budapest – Gerard of Csanád, Our Lady of Hungary
- Dunakeszi – Archangel Michael
- Eger – Donatus, John the Apostle
- Esztergom – Stephen of Hungary
- Győr – Stephen, The Weeping Madonna of Győr
- Kecskemét – Nicholas
- Keszthely – Martin of Tours
- Nagykanizsa – John of Nepomuk
- Pannonhalma – Martin of Tours
- Pécs – Maurus of Pécs, Peter the Apostle
- Pest – Roch, Rosalia, Sebastian
- Sopron – Archangel Michael
- Szeged – Demetrius, Catherine of Alexandria
- Szekszárd – Our Lady of the Assumption, Wendelin of Trier
- Szentendre – Andrew the Apostle
- Szentgotthárd – Gotthard
- Szombathely – Martin of Tours
- Veszprém – Gisella of Hungary, Archangel Michael
- Zalaegerszeg – Mary Magdalene

=== India ===
- Agartala – Francis Xavier
- Ahmedabad – Francis Xavier
- Bengaluru – Francis Xavier
- Bombay – Francis Xavier, Gonsalo Garcia
- Calcutta – Saint Teresa of Calcutta
- Kollam – Francis Xavier
- Kottar – Francis Xavier
- Madras – St.George
- Goa – Francis Xavier, Joseph Vaz
- Sivagangai – John de Britto

=== Ireland ===
- Clonmacnoise – Ciaran the Younger
- Cloyne – Colman of Cloyne
- Cork – Finbarr
- Dublin – Laurence O'Toole
- Fahan – Mura
- Ferns – Aeden of Ferns
- Kilbarry/Tarmonbarry – Saint Berach
- Kilmallock, County Limerick – Mochelloc
- Limerick – Munchin
- Ross – Fachanan

=== Italy ===
- Abruzzi – Saint Gabriel of Our Lady of Sorrows
- Amalfi – Andrew the Apostle
- Ancona – Judas Cyriacus
- Aosta – Gratus of Aosta
- Aquila – Maximus of Aquila
- Assisi – Francis of Assisi
- Bari – Nicholas, Sabinus
- Benevento – Arthelais, Barbatus of Benevento, Bartholomew
- Bergamo – Alexander of Bergamo
- Bologna – Saint Petronius
- Brescia – Faustinus and Jovita
- Brindisi – Lawrence of Brindisi
- Caltanissetta – Michael
- Capriate San Gervasio – Alexander of Bergamo
- Castellabate – Constabilis
- Castelplanio – Joseph
- Catania – Agatha, Aloysius Gonzaga
- Cervignano d'Adda – Alexander of Bergamo
- Colliano – Pope Leo X
- Como – Abundius
- Corato – Saint Catald
- Craco – Vincenzo Martyr
- Cuneo – Michael
- Fabriano – Adrian of Nicomedia
- Ferrara – George
- Florence – John the Baptist, Joseph, Zenobius
- Fonte Nuova – Joseph
- Genoa – George, John the Baptist, Syrus of Genoa
- Grosseto – Adrian and Natalia of Nicomedia
- Imperia – Leonard of Port Maurice
- La Spezia – Joseph
- Ladispoli – Joseph
- Lecce – Bernardino Realino
- Lecco – Nicholas
- Macchia Valfortore – Nicholas
- Matelica – Adrian and Natalia of Nicomedia
- Messina – Aloysius Gonzaga
- Milan – Ambrose
- Modica, Sicily – George
- Muro Lucano – Saint Gerard Majella
- Naples – Agnellus, Aloysius Gonzaga, Alphonsus Maria de Liguori, Andrew Avellino, James of the Marches, Januarius, John IV, Bishop of Naples, Patricia of Naples
- Nocera Inferiore – Prisque of Nocera
- Nocera Umbra – Raynald of Nocera
- Orvieto – Joseph
- Otranto – Antonio Primaldo and his Companion Martyrs
- Pagani, Campania – Our Lady of the Hens, Alphonsus Liguori
- Palermo – Agatha of Sicily, Benedict the Black, Rosalia
- Pavia, Italy – Syrus of Pavia (Siro), Theodore of Pavia
- Padua – Anthony of Padua
- Pescia – Abdon and Sennen
- Pisa – Rainerius
- Ponza – Silverius
- Querceta, Seravezza – Joseph
- Randazzo – Joseph
- Reggio Calabria – George
- Reggio Emilia – Prosper of Reggio
- Ripacandida – Donatus
- Rome – Lawrence, Martina of Rome, Philip Neri, Paul, Peter, Sebastian, Ignatius of Loyola
- Sant'Agata de' Goti – Alphonsus Maria de Liguori
- Salerno – Matthew the Apostle
- Siena – Ansanus the Baptizer, Ambrose Sansedoni of Siena
- Sorrento – Antoninus of Sorrento
- Spadafora – Joseph
- Syracuse – Lucy of Syracuse
- Taranto – Catald
- Trapani – Albert of Trapani
- Trieste – Justus of Trieste
- Turin – John the Baptist, Joseph, Maximus of Turin, Octavius, Solutor
- Urbino – Crescentinus
- Venice – Mark the Evangelist George, Theodore of Amasea
- Veroli – Mary Salome
- Verona – Zeno of Verona
- Volperino, Foligno – Maro

=== Kenya ===
- Kisumu – Thérèse of Lisieux

=== Lebanon ===
- Beirut – George
- Zahlé – Prophet Elias
- Zgharta – Virgin Mary, Saydet Zgharta

=== Lithuania ===
- Kaunas – Nicholas
- Vilnius – Antony of Vilnius, Christopher, Eustace of Vilnius, John of Vilnius

=== Madagascar ===
- Antananarivo – Joseph
- Antsiranana – Francis Xavier

=== Malta ===
- Birgu – Lawrence
- Birkirkara – Anthony of Padua, Saint Helena, Joseph, Our Lady of Mount Carmel
- Birzebbugia – Peter
- Isla – Santa Maria Bambina, Christ the Redeemer
- Kalkara – Joseph
- Luqa – Andrew
- Marsaskala – Anne
- Mdina – Paul the Apostle's Conversion
- Msida – Joseph
- Qala – Joseph
- Qormi – Saint George
- Siġġiewi – Nicholas
- Ta' Xbiex – St. John of the Cross
- Valletta – Saint Augustine, Saint Dominic, Our Lady of Mount Carmel, Paul the Apostle
- Victoria, Gozo – George
- Xewkija, Gozo – John the Baptist
- Zejtun – Catherine of Alexandria
- Zurrieq – Catherine of Alexandria

=== Mexico ===
- Cuauhtitlan – Juan Diego
- Mexico City – Our Lady Of Guadalupe, Philip Of Jesus
- Santiago de Querétaro – James the Greater

=== Montenegro ===
- Bar – Jovan Vladimir

=== Netherlands ===
- Aalsum – St. Catherine of Alexandria
- Alkmaar – Lawrence
- Amersfoort – George
- Amsterdam – Nicholas
- Dordrecht – Mary
- Gouda – John the Baptist
- Groningen – Walburga, Martin of Tours
- Haarlem – Bavo
- Kerkrade – Barbara
- Maastricht – Servatius of Tongeren, Amand of Maastricht
- Nijmegen – Stephen
- The Hague – Gabriel
- Utrecht – Martin of Tours
- Winschoten – Vitus
- Zutphen – Walburga

=== Nicaragua ===
- Managua – Theophilus of Antioch

=== Norway ===
- Oslo – Hallvard

=== Peru ===
- Arequipa – Theophilus of Antioch
- Cusco – Anthony of Padua, Sebastian
- Piura – John Bosco
- Pucallpa – Sebastian

=== Philippines ===
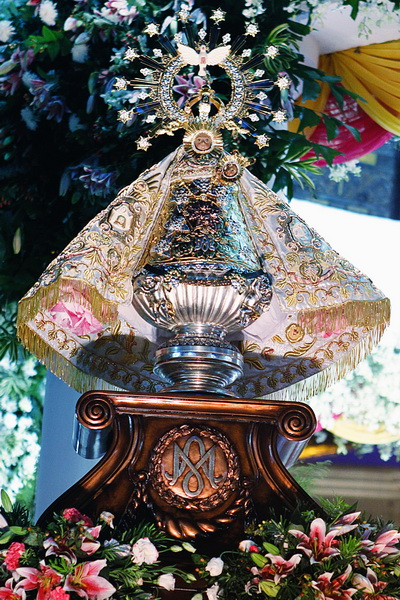
Our Lady of Peñafrancia, enshrined in Naga City, Philippines

- Abuyog – Francis Xavier
- Alegria – Francis Xavier
- Antipolo – Our Lady of Peace and Good Voyage, Thérèse of Lisieux
- Arayat – Catherine of Alexandria
- Bagac – Catherine of Alexandria
- Bacolod – Sebastian
- Baguio – Our Lady of Atonement
- Bantay – Augustine of Hippo, Our Lady of Charity
- Borbon, Cebu – Sebastian
- Bulacan – Paschal Baylón, Claire of Assisi, Our Lady of Salambáo
- Cabatuan, Iloilo – Nicholas of Tolentino
- Cabuyao – Polycarp, Joseph the Worker
- Cagayan de Oro – Augustine of Hippo
- Calatagan – Dominic of Silos
- Calamba, Laguna – John the Baptist
- Caloocan – Roch
- Capas – Nicholas of Tolentino
- Carcar – Catherine of Alexandria
- Catbalogan – Philip Neri
- Cavite City – Our Lady of Solitude of Porta Vaga, Roch
- Cebu – Our Lady of Guadalupe, Pedro Calungsod
- Davao City – Peter the Apostle
- Dumaguete – Catherine of Alexandria
- Gerona – Catherine of Alexandria
- Indang – Gregory the Great
- Iloilo City – Our Lady of the Candles
- Las Piñas – Joseph, Our Lady Of the Pillar
- Lemery, Batangas – Roch
- Leon – Catherine of Alexandria
- Lian, Batangas – John the Baptist
- Lumban – Sebastian
- Makati – Peter and Paul the Apostles, Our Lady of Guadalupe, John Bosco
- Malabon – Bartholomew the Apostle, Immaculate Conception
- Mandaluyong – Philip Neri, Dominic Savio
- Manila – Immaculate Conception, Lorenzo Ruiz, Our Lady of Montserrat, Andrew the Apostle
- Marikina – Our Lady of the Abandoned
- Muntinlupa – Our Lady of the Abandoned
- Noveleta – Holy Cross, Helena of Constantinople, Our Lady of Peace and Good Voyage
- Naga, Camarines Sur – Our Lady of Peñafrancia
- Nasugbu – Francis Xavier
- Obando, Bulacan – Our Lady of Salambáo, Pascal Baylón, Clare of Assisi
- Pagbilao – Catherine of Alexandria
- Parañaque – Andrew the Apostle, Our Lady of the Good Event, Mary, Help Of Christians, John Bosco, Santo Niño de Parañaque, Dominic Savio, Laura Vicuña, Francis of Assisi
- Pasay – Clare of Assisi, Thérèse of Lisieux
- Pasig – Immaculate Conception
- Pateros – Martha, Roch
- Porac – Catherine of Alexandria
- Pulilan – Isidore the Laborer
- Quezon City – Our Lady of La Naval de Manila
- Santa – Catherine of Alexandria
- Santa Catalina – Catherine of Alexandria
- Santa Catalina – Catherine of Alexandria
- San Juan, Batangas – John of Nepomuk
- San Juan City – John the Baptist
- San Marcelino, Zambales – Isidore the Laborer
- Santa Teresita, Batangas – Thérèse of Lisieux
- Sulat – Ignatius of Loyola
- Surigao City – Nicholas of Tolentino
- Tanza – Holy Cross, Augustine of Hippo
- Taal, Batangas – Martin of Tours
- Tagaytay– Our Lady of Lourdes
- Taguig – Anne
- Tagum – Christ the King
- Tandag – Nicholas of Tolentino
- Tarlac City – Sebastian
- Taytay – John the Baptist
- Tayum – Catherine of Alexandria

=== Poland ===
- Bydgoszcz – Martin of Tours
- Cracow – Faustina, Stanislaus of Szczepanów
- Markowa – Dorothy, Józef and Wiktoria Ulma with Seven Children
- Częstochowa – Mary
- Jastrzębie-Zdrój – John of Nepomuk
- Łódź – Faustina
- Poznań – Peter, Paul
- Warsaw – Andrew Bobola, Faustina, Władysław of Gielniów
- Wrocław – John the Baptist

=== Portugal ===
- Funchal – James the Less, Saint Roch
- Lisbon – Anthony of Lisbon, Vincent of Saragossa
- Porto – John the Baptist
- Póvoa de Varzim – Peter

=== Romania ===
- Bucharest, Romania – Demetrius of Basarab
- Curtea de Argeș – Nicholas, Philophteia
- Iași – Parascheva of the Balkans, George
- Oradea – Ladislaus I of Hungary
- Sfântu Gheorghe – George
- Suceava – John the New of Suceava, George

=== Russia ===
- Arkhangelsk – Michael (archangel)
- Murom – Peter and Fevronia
- Moscow – Boris, George, Saint Peter of Moscow
- Pskov – Vsevolod of Pskov
- Saint Petersburg – Peter, Xenia
- Samara – Alexius of Moscow

=== Rwanda ===
- Kigali – Stephen

=== Serbia ===
- Belgrade – Jesus (as the Holy Saviour), Demetrius, Theophilus of Antioch
- Sremska Mitrovica – Demetrius and Methodius
- Kragujevac – George
- Leskovac – Holy Trinity
- Niš – Procopius
- Novi Sad – George
- Prizren – George
- Arilje – Achillius
- Požarevac – Holy Trinity
- Svilajnac – Constantine, Helena

=== Slovakia ===
- Košice – Elizabeth of Hungary
- Kysucké Nové Mesto – James, son of Alphaeus
- Nitra – Andrew Zorard
- Svätý Jur – George

=== Slovenia ===
- Celje – Maximilian of Lorch
- Koper – Nazarius of Koper
- Ljubljana – George
- Maribor – John the Baptist, Mary Magdalene
- Ptuj – George

=== South Africa ===
- Cape Town – Francis Xavier
- Witbank – Thérèse of Lisieux

=== Spain ===
- Alcalá de Henares – Justus, Pastor
- Andalusia – Saint Luke
- Barakaldo – Our Lady of Mount Carmel, Vincent of Saragossa
- Barcelona – Eulalia, Raymond of Penyafort
- Calahorra – Emeterius and Celedonius
- Candeleda – Bernard of Valdeiglesias
- Cartagena – Modestus
- Cordoba – Acisclus
- Extremadura – Peter of Alcantara
- Granada, Spain – Caecilius of Elvira
- Jaén – Saint Luke
- Las Palmas de Gran Canaria (Canary Islands) – Anne
- Madrid – Eustace, Isidore the Laborer, Justus, Pastor
- Mallorca – Alphonsus Rodriguez -
- Sahagun – Abdon
- San Cristóbal de La Laguna (Canary Islands) – Christopher
- Santa Cruz de Tenerife (Canary Islands) – James the Greater
- Santander – Emeterius and Celedonius
- Santiago de Compostela – James the Greater
- Segovia – St. John of the Cross
- Sestao – Peter
- Seville, Spain – Ferdinand III of Castile, Justa
- Tarragona – Santa Tecla Gloriosa, mare dels tarragonins, Saint Maginus
- Toledo – Leocadia
- Valencia – Vincent Martyr
- Zamarramala – Agatha of Sicily
- Zaragoza – La Pilarica, Saint Valerius

=== Sri Lanka ===
- Colombo – Lawrence
- Negombo – Sebastian

=== Sweden ===
- Stockholm – Eric of Sweden
- Växjö – Sigfrid of Sweden

=== Syria ===
- Damascus – John of Damascus

=== Tanzania ===
- Dodoma – Stephen

=== Turkey ===
- Antioch – Barnabas, Theophilus of Antioch
- Constantinople – John Chrysostom, Constantine the Great, George
- Smyrna – Polycarp

=== Ukraine ===
- Kyiv – Michael

=== United Kingdom ===
- Aberdeen – Machar, Nicholas, Our Lady of Aberdeen
- Abingdon-on-Thames – Edmund of Abingdon, Helen
- Bampton, Oxfordshire – Beornwald
- Bodmin – Petroc
- Boston – Botulph
- Bristol – Jordan of Bristol
- Buckingham – Rumwold
- Caerleon – Cadog
- Canterbury – Augustine of Canterbury, Thomas Becket
- Cardiff – Teilo, Piran
- Chester – Werburgh
- Chichester – Richard of Chichester
- Colchester – Helen of Constantinople
- Crowland – Guthlac
- Derby – Alcmund of Derby
- Dorchester-on-Thames – Birinus
- Droitwich – Richard of Chichester
- Dumfries – Michael
- Dundee – Mary
- Durham – Cuthbert of Lindisfarne
- Edinburgh – Giles
- Ely – Etheldreda
- Exeter – Sidwell
- Glasgow – Kentigern (St Mungo), Theneva (St Enoch)
- Greenwich – Alfege
- Hereford – Thomas Cantilupe
- Holywell – Winifred
- Jarrow – Bede
- Leicester – Martin of Tours
- Lichfield – Chad of Mercia
- Lincoln – Mary, Hugh of Lincoln
- Linlithgow – Michael
- Liverpool – Nicholas
- Llandeilo Fawr – Teilo
- Llantwit Major – Illtud
- London – Erkenwald, George, Mellitus, Michael, Paul the Apostle
- Malmesbury – Aldhelm
- Northampton – Crispin
- Newport – Gwynllyw the Bearded
- Oxford – Frideswide
- Padstow – Piran
- Paisley – Mirin, James the Greater, Our Lady of Paisley
- Perranporth – Piran
- Perth – John the Baptist
- Portsmouth – Thomas Becket, Nicholas
- Preston, Lancashire – St Wilfrid
- Reading – James the Greater
- Ripon – Wilfrid
- St. Albans – Alban
- St Andrews – Andrew
- St. Brides Wentloog – Brigit of Kildare (Welsh: Ffraid)
- St. Davids – David (Dewi Sant)
- St. Helier, Jersey – Helier
- St. Peter Port, Guernsey – Peter
- Salisbury – Osmund
- Shrewsbury – Winifred
- Stafford – Beorhthelm
- Steyning – Cuthman
- Sunderland – Benedict Biscop
- Tyne and Wear – Bede
- Winchcombe – Kenelm
- Winchester – Swithun
- Worcester – Oswald of Worcester, Wulfstan
- Wrexham – Richard Gwyn
- York – Peter, William of York

=== United States ===
- Acoma Pueblo – James the Greater
- Arlington, Virginia – Thomas More
- Baltimore, Maryland – Immaculate Conception
- Boston, Massachusetts – Patrick
- Cheyenne, Wyoming – Thérèse of Lisieux
- Detroit, Michigan – Anne
- Fresno, California – Thérèse of Lisieux
- Green Bay, Wisconsin – Francis Xavier
- Indianapolis, Indiana – Francis Xavier
- Joliet, Illinois – Francis Xavier
- Kalamazoo, Michigan – Augustine of Hippo
- Key West, Florida – Francis Xavier
- Las Vegas, Nevada – Paul the Apostle
- Los Angeles, California– Our Lady, Queen of Angels
- New Orleans, Louisiana – Joan of Arc
- New York City – Nicholas
- Pueblo, Colorado – Thérèse of Lisieux
- Ruskin, Florida – Anne
- Saint Paul, Minnesota – Paul the Apostle
- San Antonio, Texas – Anthony of Padua
- San Diego, California – Didacus of Alcalá
- San Francisco, California – Francis of Assisi
- Santa Fe, New Mexico – Francis of Assisi
- Santa Rosa, California – Rose of Lima
- Seattle, Washington – James the Greater
- St. Augustine, Florida – Augustine of Hippo
- St. Louis, Missouri – Louis
- St. Petersburg, Florida – Saint Jude
- Superior, Wisconsin – Augustine of Hippo
- Taos, New Mexico – Anne, John the Apostle
- Thibodaux, Louisiana – Valeria of Milan
- Tucson, Arizona – Augustine of Hippo

=== Venezuela ===
- Maracay – Saint Joseph

== Extraterrestrial locations ==
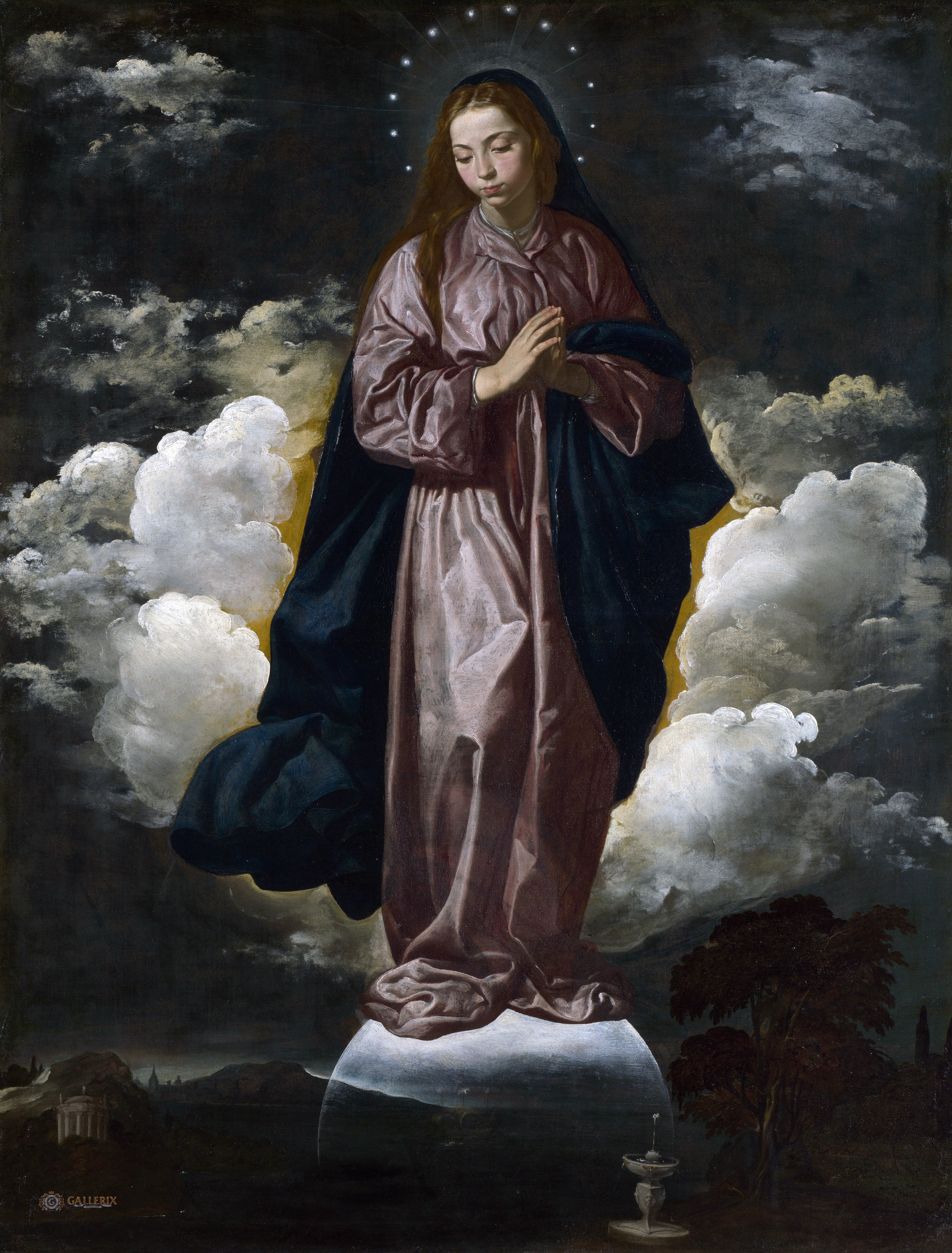
Mary is the patroness saint of the Roman Catholic Diocese of Orlando, which the Bishop claimed included the moon.

Location	Patron saint	Notes
Outer space	Joseph of Cupertino	Because of his ability to levitate, Joseph of Cupertino is the patron saint of astronauts.
Moon	Mary, mother of Jesus	Mary is the patroness saint of the Roman Catholic Diocese of Orlando, which Bishop William Donald Borders claimed included the moon due to a technicality in the 1917 Code of Canon Law which supposedly expanded the diocese's territory to include the moon following the flight of Apollo 11.

== See also ==
- Patron saints of ailments, illness, and dangers
- Patron saints of occupations and activities
- Patronage of the Blessed Virgin Mary
- Patron day
- Patron saints of ethnic groups
