= Patronage of the Blessed Virgin Mary =

Spiritual protection attributed to Mary

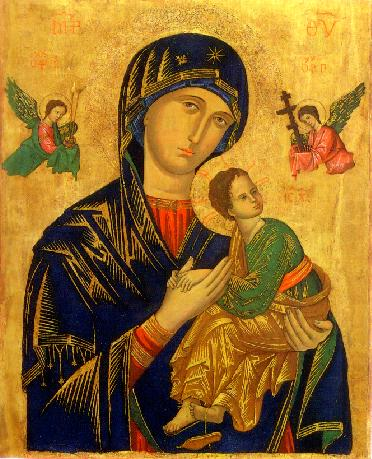
Our Lady of Perpetual Help

A patronage of the Blessed Virgin Mary is a form of spiritual protection attributed to Mary, mother of Jesus, in favor of some occupations, activities, religious orders, congregations, dioceses, and geographic locations.

== Occupations and activities ==
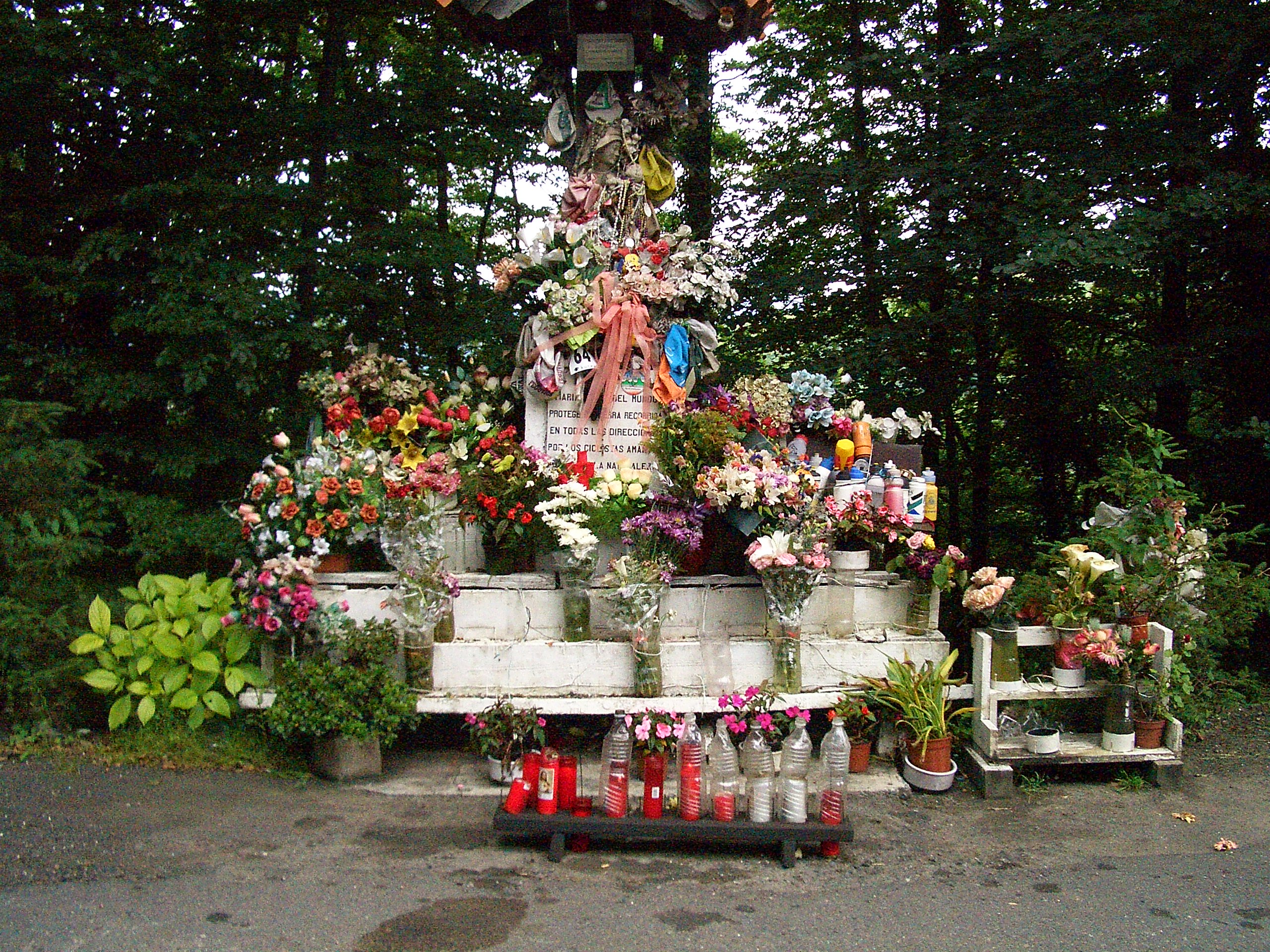
Virgin Mary, venerated as the patron saint of bicyclists, near Leintz-Gatzaga in the Basque Country

The Blessed Virgin is cited as the patroness of all humanity. However, certain occupations and activities are more closely associated with her protection.

- Bicyclists - Madonna del Ghisallo
- Brothers Hospitallers of Saint John of God
- Carmelites and Discalced Carmelites - Our Lady of Mount Carmel
- Cistercians
- Fishmongers (Assumption of the Blessed Virgin)
- Overseas Filipino Workers - Our Lady of Guidance
- Harness makers (Assumption of the Blessed Virgin)
- Seafarers - Our Lady, Star of the Sea
- Spanish Civil Guard - Our Lady of the Pillar
- Pilots/Aviators - Our Lady of Loreto

== Dioceses indicating the Blessed Virgin Mary as patroness ==
- Maronite Catholic Eparchy of Our Lady of Lebanon of Los Angeles
- Albany, New York (Immaculate Conception)
- Altoona-Johnstown, Pennsylvania
- Antipolo, Philippines (Our Lady of Peace and Good Voyage)
- Austin, Texas
- Baltimore, Maryland
  - Apostleship of the Sea, Baltimore - Stella Maris (Our Lady Star of the Sea)
- Bismarck, North Dakota
- Burlington, Vermont- the Immaculate Conception
- Camden, New Jersey
- Cebu, Philippines - Our Lady of Guadalupe
- Charlotte, North Carolina
- Cologne, Germany (Immaculate Conception)
- Colorado Springs, Colorado
- Crookston, Minnesota
- Denver, Colorado
- Des Moines, Iowa
- Dodge City, Kansas
- Duluth, Minnesota
- Essen, Germany (Our Lady of Good Counsel)
- Evansville, Indiana
- Fargo, North Dakota - the Immaculate Conception
- Fort Wayne-South Bend, Indiana - the Immaculate Conception
- Gallup, New Mexico
- Gaylord, Michigan
- Grand Island, Nebraska
- Greensburg, Pennsylvania - Our Lady of the Assumption
- Guadalajara, Jalisco
- Halifax, Nova Scotia
- Hildesheim, Germany
- Honolulu, Hawaii - Our Lady of Peace
- Ho Chi Minh City, Vietnam - Immaculate Conception
- Huế, Vietnam - Our Lady of La Vang
- Imus, Philippines - Our Lady of the Pillar
- Issele-Uku, Nigeria - Our Lady of Perpetual Help
- Jefferson City, Missouri - Immaculate Heart of Mary
- Lancaster, England - Our Lady of Lourdes
- Malaga, Spain - Our Lady of the Victory
- Malang, Indonesia - Our Lady of Mount Carmel
- Manila, Philippines (Immaculate Conception)
- Miami, Florida
- Middlesbrough, England - Our Lady of Perpetual Help
- Monterey, California
- Montreal, Canada (dioecesis Marianopolitanis)
- Nashville, Tennessee
- Archdiocese of Caceres, Naga, Camarines Sur (Our Lady of Peñafrancia)
- New Orleans, Louisiana - Our Lady of Prompt Succor
- New Ulm, Minnesota
- Ogdensburg, New York
- Orange County, California - Our Lady of Guadalupe
- Parañaque, Philippines (Our Lady of the Good Success)
- Philadelphia, Pennsylvania
- Phoenix, Arizona
- Pittsburgh, Pennsylvania
- Portland, Maine
- Portland, Oregon
- Providence, Rhode Island (Our Lady of Providence)
- Pueblo, Colorado
- Raleigh, North Carolina
- Reno, Nevada
- Rockford, Illinois
- Sacramento, California - Our Lady of Guadalupe
- Salina, Kansas - Our Lady of Perpetual Help
- San Cristóbal de La Laguna, Canary Islands - Virgin of Los Remedios
- Santander, Spain - Our Lady of Aparecida
- Savannah, Georgia
- Seattle, Washington
- Shreveport, Louisiana
- Sioux City, Iowa
- Spokane, Washington
- Steubenville, Ohio - Immaculate Heart of Mary
- Sydney, Australia - Our Lady Help of Christians
- Syracuse, New York
- Toowoomba, Queensland - Mary of the Southern Cross
- Tyler, Texas
- Venice, Florida - Our Lady of Mercy
- Wichita, Kansas
- Zamboanga, Philippines - Our Lady of the Pillar
- Territorial Prelature of Marawi - Our Lady Help of Christians

== Places ==
A large number of countries, places and groups claim the Blessed Virgin Mary as a patroness, though usually under a specific title or apparition while only a select few retains its patronage by Pontifical decree from Rome.

=== Africa ===
- Algeria - Our Lady of Africa
- Angola - Immaculate Heart of Mary
- Cameroon - Immaculate heart of Mary
- Ethiopia - Mother of light
- Uganda - Mary, Queen of Africa

=== Asia ===
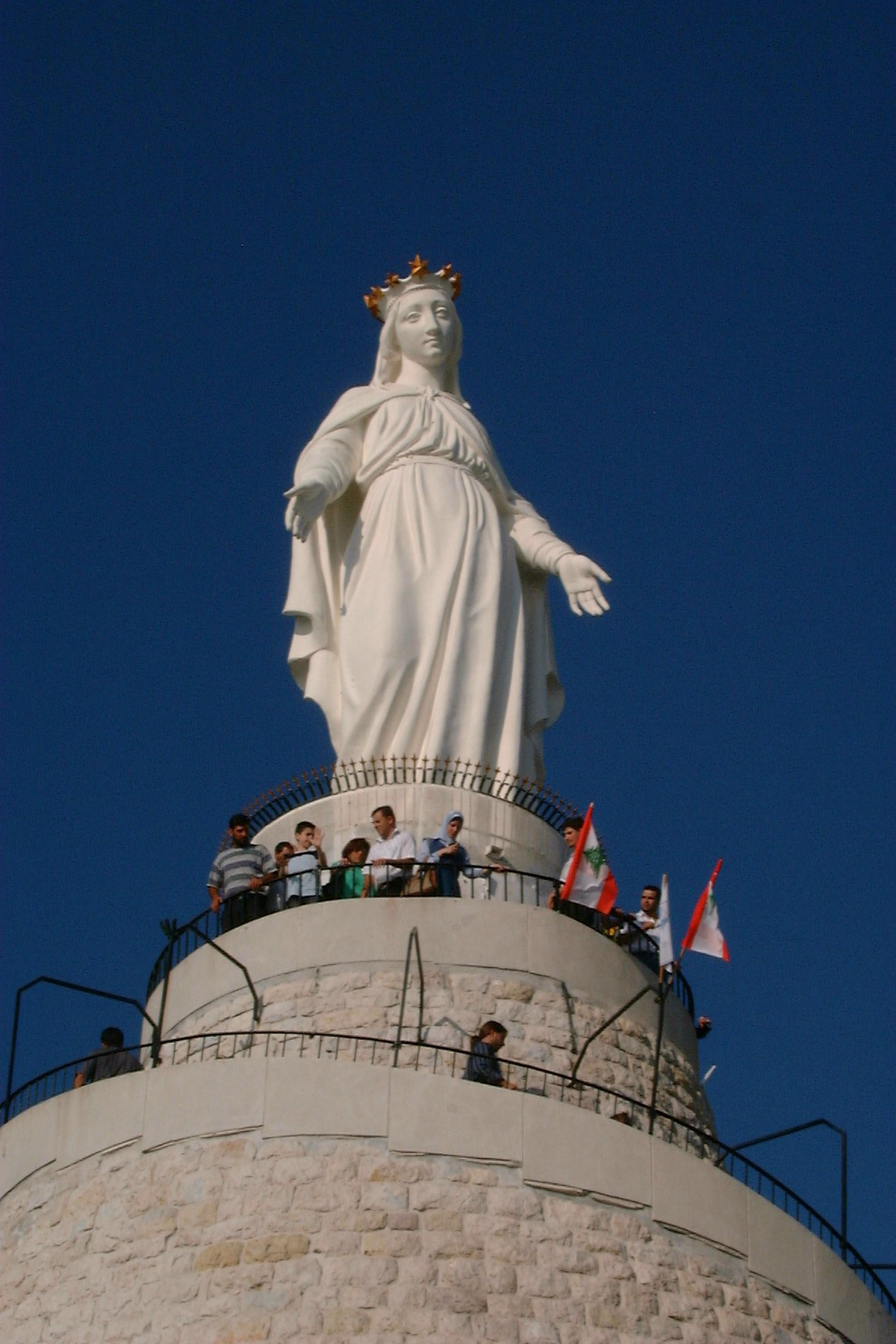
Statue of Our Lady of Lebanon or Notre Dame du Liban

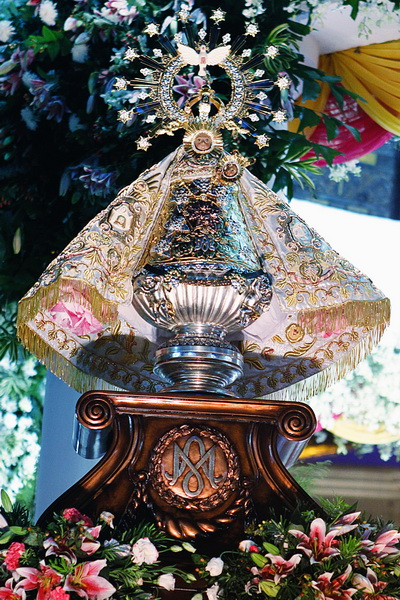
Our Lady of Peñafrancia in Naga City, Philippines

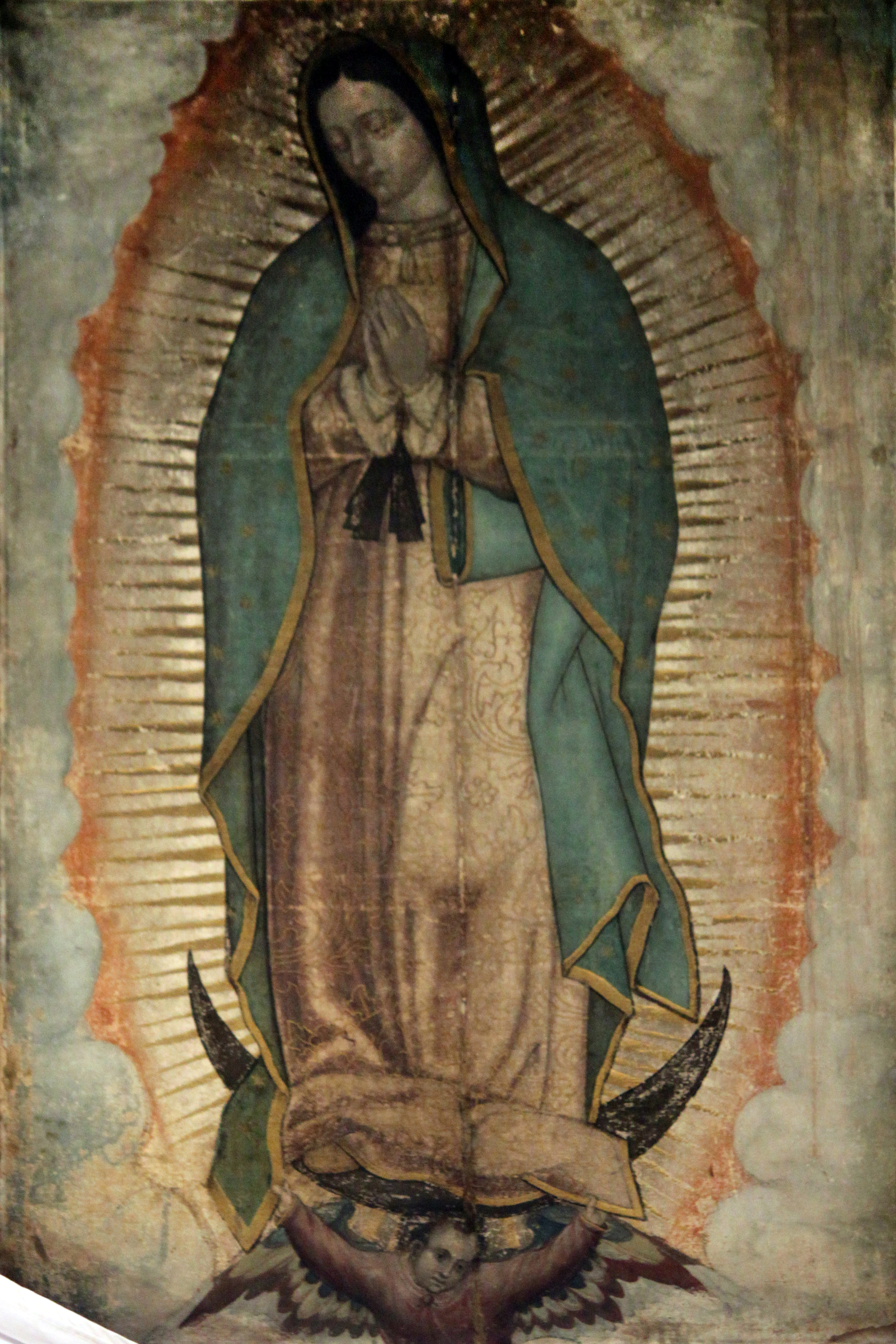
Nuestra Señora de Guadalupe

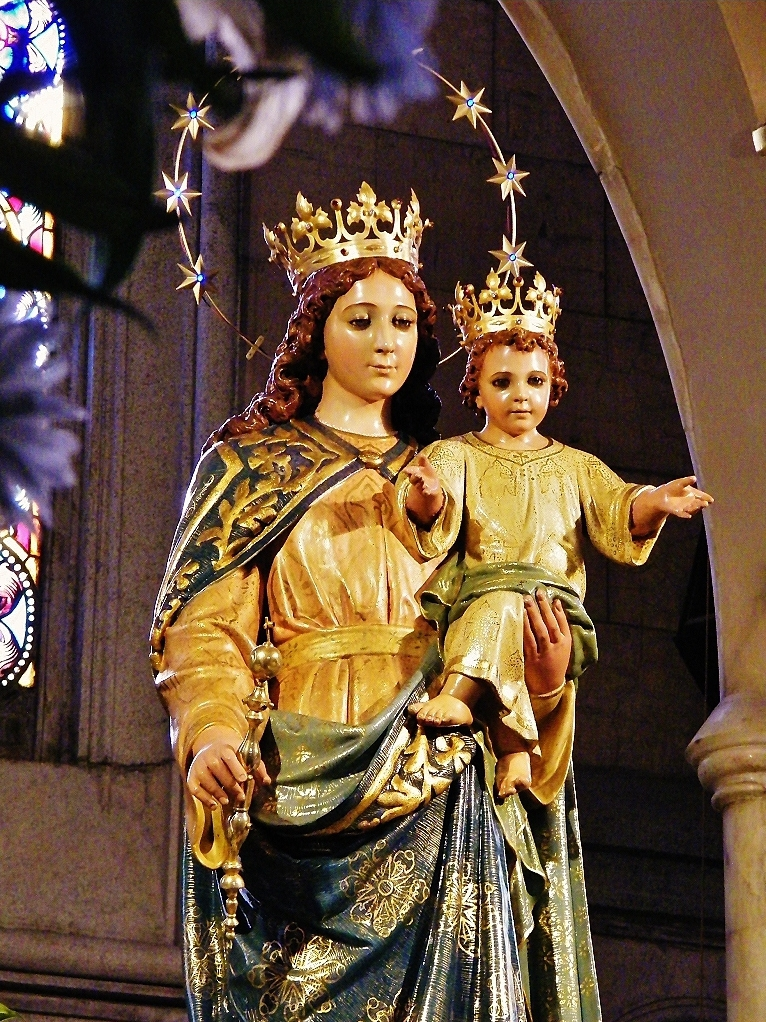
Our Lady Help of Christians

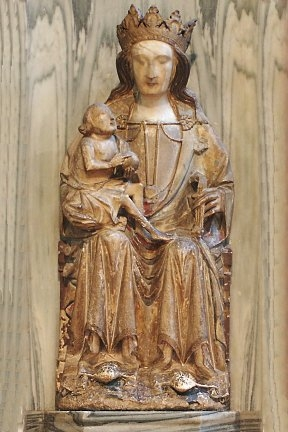
Our Lady of Westminster

- Apostolic Vicariate of Northern Arabia - Our Lady of Arabia
  - Kuwait - Our Lady of Arabia
- China - Mary Help of Christians
- India - Our Lady of the Assumption
- Korea - Immaculate Conception
  - Andong - Immaculate Conception
  - Busan - Our Lady of Rosary
  - Incheon - Our Lady, Star of the Sea
  - Seoul - Immaculate Conception
  - Suwon - Our Lady of Peace
  - Daegeon - Our Lady of Lourdes
  - Daegu - Our Lady of Lourdes
  - Jeju - Immaculate Conception
- Lebanon - Our Lady of Lebanon
- Philippines - Immaculate Conception - Principal patroness of the Philippines
  - Baguio - Our Lady of Atonement
  - Santa Maria, Ilocos Sur - Our Lady of the Assumption
  - Manaoag, Pangasinan - Our Lady of Manaoag
  - Bicol Region - Our Lady of Peñafrancia (Ina ng Peñafrancia)
  - Cavite province - Our Lady of Porta Vaga
    - Imus City and the Diocese - Nuestra Señora del Pilar de Imus
    - Silang - Our Lady of Candelaria
    - Dasmariñas - Immaculate Conception
  - Loboc, Bohol - Our Lady of Guadalupe in Extremadura
  - Manila - Our Lady of Guidance
    - Santa Ana - Nuestra Señora de los Desamparados de Manila (Our Lady of the Abandoned)
  - Obando, Bulacan - Our Lady of the Immaculate Conception of Salambao
  - Pampanga - Virgen de los Remedios de Pampanga (Our Lady of Remedies)
  - Parañaque - (Nuestra Senora del Buen Suceso)
  - Piat, Cagayan - Our Lady of Piat
  - Vietnam - Our Lady of La Vang
  - Quezon City - Our Lady of Hope
  - Western Visayas - Our Lady of the Candles
  - Cebu Province and the Archdiocese - Our Lady of Guadalupe
  - Zamboanga City - Our Lady of the Pillar
- Syria - Our Lady of Damascus

=== The Americas ===
- Our Lady of Guadalupe

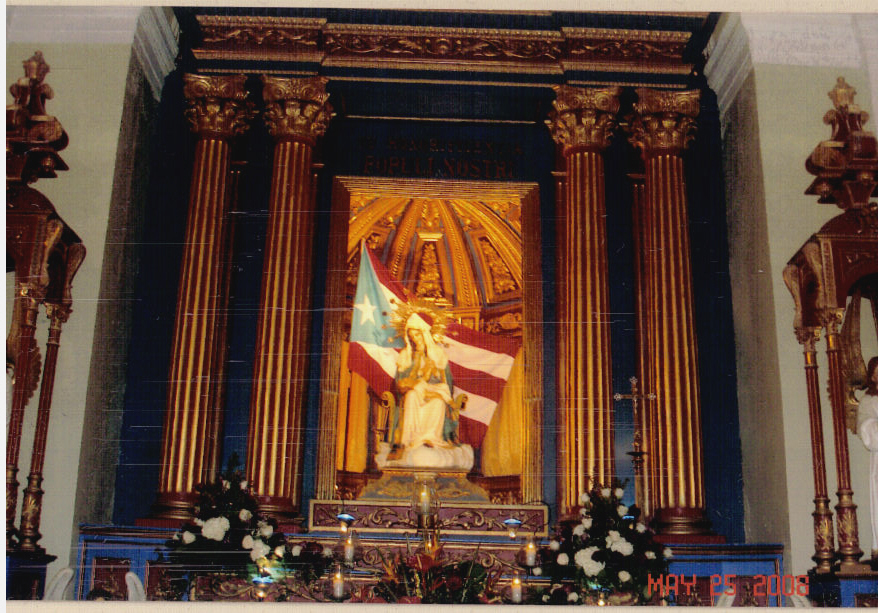
Virgen de la Providencia in the Cathedral of San Juan

==== Caribbean ====
- Jamaica - Our Lady of the Blue Mountains and Our Lady of the Assumption.
- Cuba - Our Lady of Charity of El Cobre (Nuestra Señora de la Caridad del Cobre)
- Dominican Republic - Our Lady of Altagracia
- Haiti - Our Lady of Perpetual Help
- Puerto Rico - Our Lady of Divine Providence

==== Central America ====
- Costa Rica - Our Lady of the Angels
- El Salvador - Our Lady of Peace (Nuestra Seňora de la Paz)
- Guatemala - Our Lady of the Rosary -
- Honduras - Our Lady of Suyapa
- Nicaragua - Our Lady of the Immaculate Conception of El Viejo
- Panama - Our Lady of La Antigua

==== North America ====
- Mexico - Our Lady of Guadalupe
  - Jalisco - Our Lady of Expectation (Our Lady of Zapopan)
- United States - Patroness of the United States under her title of the Immaculate Conception
  - Louisiana - Our Lady of Prompt Succor
  - Mississippi - Our Lady of Sorrows
  - Guam - Santa Marian Kamalen
- Canada - Notre-Dame-du-Cap

==== South America ====
- Argentina - Our Lady of Luján
- Bolivia - Virgin of Copacabana
- Brazil - Our Lady of Aparecida
- Chile - Our Lady of Carmel of the Maipú
- Colombia - Our Lady of the Rosary of Chiquinquirá
- Ecuador - Our Lady of the Presentation of El Quinche
- Paraguay - Our Lady of the Miracles of Caacupé
- Peru - Our Lady of Mercy
- Uruguay - The Virgin of the Thirty Three (La Virgen de los Treinta y Tres)
- Venezuela - Our Lady of Coromoto
  - Zulia - Our Lady of the Rosary of Chiquinquirá

=== Australia/Oceania ===
- Our Lady Help of Christians
- New Zealand - Our Lady of the Assumption
- Samoa - Our Lady Star of the Sea

=== Europe ===
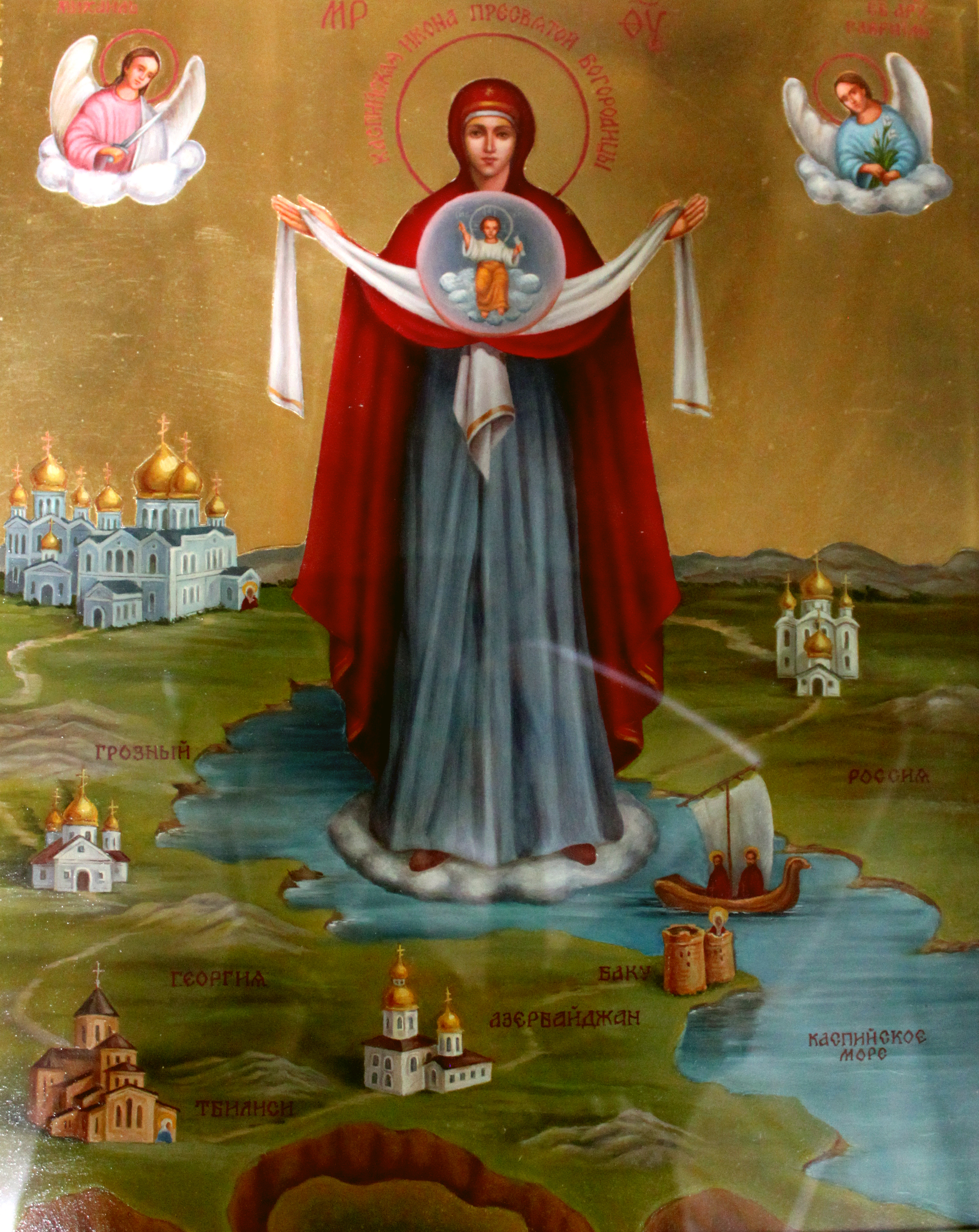
The Virgin Mary, Protector of the Caucasus, patron saint of Azerbaijan

- Albania - Our Lady of Good Counsel
- Andorra - Our Lady of Meritxell
- Austria - Our Lady of Mariazell
- Azerbaijan - The Virgin Mary, Protector of Caucasus
- Belgium - Our Lady of Beauraing
- Croatia - Mother of Goodness
- England - Our Lady of Walsingham (England has also been referred to as the Dowry of Mary)
- Germany
  - Bavaria - Our Lady of Altötting
- Greece
  - Tinos - Our Lady of Great Grace or Evangelistria (Our Lady of Good Tidings)
- Hungary - Queen of Hungary, Great Lady of the Hungarians
- Ireland - Our Lady of Knock
- Italy
  - Castellammare del Golfo, Sicily - Our Lady of Prompt Succor
  - Rome - Salus Populi Romani
- Lithuania - Our Lady of the Gate of Dawn
- Luxembourg - Our Lady, Comforter of the Afflicted
- Malta - Blessed Virgin of Ta' Pinu
- Netherlands - Our Lady, Star of the Sea
- Poland - The Most Holy Virgin Mary, Queen of Poland (also as Our Lady of Częstochowa or Bogurodzica)
- Portugal - Our Lady of Fátima
- Republic of Macedonia
  - Skopje - Mother of God
- Russia - Our Lady of Kazan
- Slovakia - Our Lady of Sorrows
- Spain - Our Lady of the Pillar
  - Almoradí - Our Lady of Perpetual Help
  - Asturias - Our Lady of Covadonga
  - Barcelona - Our Lady of Ransom
  - Biscay - Our Lady of Begoña
  - Catalonia - Virgin of Montserrat
  - Canary Islands - Virgin of Candelaria
  - Extremadura - Our Lady of Guadalupe (Extremadura)
  - Trujillo, Cáceres - Virgen de la Victoria (Our Lady of Victory)
- Switzerland - Our Lady of the Hermits
- United Kingdom
  - Gibraltar - Our Lady of Europe

=== Outer space ===
- Moon - Mary is the patroness of the Roman Catholic Diocese of Orlando, which Bishop William Donald Borders claimed included the moon because of a technicality in the 1917 Code of Canon Law.

== Religious groups ==
- Benedictines
- Carmelites and Discalced Carmelites - Our Lady of Mount Carmel
- Congregation of Holy Cross - Our Lady of Sorrows
  - Sisters of the Holy Cross - Immaculate Heart of Mary
- Congregation of the Holy Ghost - Immaculate Heart of Mary
- Congregation of the Sacred Hearts of Jesus and Mary - Our Lady of Peace
- Franciscan Sisters of the Immaculate Heart of Mary - Immaculate Heart of Mary
- Missionary Sisters of Saint Peter Claver Our Lady of Good Counsel
- Order of Preachers (Dominicans)
- Order of the Blessed Virgin Mary of Mercy - Our Lady of Ransom
- Servite Order - Our Lady of Sorrows
- Jesuits - Madonna Della Strada
- Schoenstatt Apostolic Movement - Mother Thrice Admirable
- Order of the Brothers of Our Lady of Bethlehem (Bethlehemite)

== See also ==
- Our Lady of the Thirty-Three
- Patron saints of ailments, illness and dangers
- Patron saints of occupations and activities
- Patron saints of places
- Titles of Mary
