= Patron saints of ailments, illness, and dangers =

Saints invoked for protection from, or aid struggling with, various troubles

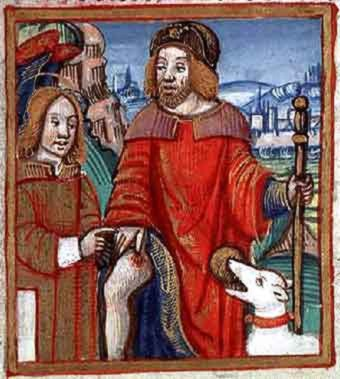
Saint Roch is invoked against the bubonic plague.

Saints have often been prevailed upon in requests for intercessory prayers to protect against or help combatting a variety of dangers, illnesses, and ailments. This is a list of saints and such ills traditionally associated with them. In shorthand, they are called the patron saints of (people guarding against or grappling with) these various troubles.

== A ==
- Against abortion, miscarriage – Catherine of Vadstena
- Alcoholism – Martin of Tours
- Arthritis – Alphonsus Liguori
- Auditory conditions and diseases – Ovidius

== B ==
- Victims of betrayal and of torture – Epipodius
- Against motorcycle/bicycle accidents – Denise
- Invoked against blight, frost, storms, alcoholism, and faintness – Urban of Langres
- Blind and the lame – Abel of Reims
- The blind – Aloysius Gonzaga
- Blindness, eye disease, eye problems, sore eyes – Leodegar
- Protectress of blind people – Paraskevi of Rome
- Protector of sufferers from broken bones and hernias – Mammes
- Bodybuilders - Hyacinth, Sebastian
- Against bullies and verbal abuse – Kentigern, Therese of Lisieux, Galileo Nicolini

== C ==
- Cancer – Peregrine Laziosi
- Breast cancer – Agatha
- Stomach cancer, youth, people who suffer from shyness – Alfie Lambe
- Invoked against cattle diseases – Berlinda of Meerbeke
- Chest problems, lung problems, gambling addictions – Bernardino of Siena
- Invoked during childbirth and against diseases of the eye – Hemma of Gurk
- Childbirth, sickness – Juliana of Nicomedia
- Women in difficult labor – John of Bridlington
- Difficult pregnancy and safe child birth – Peter and Fevronia of Murom
- Invoked by pregnant women for safe delivery of children – Silvia
- Childhood illnesses – Deicolus
- Childhood diseases; difficult marriages; victims of abuse – Pharaildis
- Convulsive children; invoked against storms and rain – Scholastica
- Invoked against cholera, epidemics, knee problems, plague, skin diseases – Roch
- Choreas (Sydenham's chorea, Huntington's disease), epilepsy, seizures, oversleeping – Vitus
- Invoked against cirrhosis and other liver diseases – Giuseppe Benedetto Cottolengo
- Riot, civil disorder – Andrew Corsini
- Against cold and cold weather – Sebaldus
- Against colic – Agapitus of Palestrina
- Invoked against colic in children, intestinal ailments and diseases, cramps and the pain of women in labour – Erasmus of Formiae (St Elmo) Saint Bonaventure
- Convulsions, epilepsy, epileptics – Willibrord
- Coughs, sneezes, and dropsy – Quentin
- Invoked against cramps, afflictions associated with the nerves and ears – Cornelius
- Cramp, headache, bearing false witness, perjury – Pancras
- Involved against criminals – Saint Peter
- Crohns disease and IBS – Carlos Manuel Rodríguez Santiago

== D ==
- Deafness – Audoin (Ouen)
- Dying people, expectant mothers, hesitation, happy death, holy death, interior souls, people in doubt, pioneers, pregnant women, travellers, and fetuses – Joseph
- Demons, fever – Patroclus of Troyes
- Diabetics – Pauline of the Agonizing Heart of Jesus
- Invoked against dropsy, childhood sicknesses, hailstones, the pain of childbirth, and gout – Gotthard of Hildesheim
- Invoked against drought – Reverianus
- Against drought – Trophimus of Arles
- Those in danger of drowning – Hyacinth
- Drug addiction – Maximilian Kolbe

== E ==
- Earache, dysentery – Polycarp
- Invoked against earthquakes – Emygdius of Ascoli
- Epidemics, diseases – Four Holy Marshals
- Invoked against epilepsy and headaches – Gerard of Lunel
- Epilepsy, against rabies, against infantile convulsions – Guy of Anderlecht
- Invoked against erysipelas, lightning, horse theft, wildfires, and drowning – Castulus
- Invoked against evil spirits, leprosy, thunderstorms, bacterial diseases, and bacterial infections – Agrippina of Mineo
- Sore eyes – Augustine of Hippo
- Eye disease – Cyriacus
- Eye and skin conditions; knee pains; invoked against adultery and marital difficulties – Gangulphus
- Eye problems, eye disease – Harvey

== F ==
- Fainting, plague, epilepsy – Valentine
- Against diseases in the feet – Saint Alphonsa
- Invoked against foot troubles, lameness, rheumatism, rats, and mice – Servatius
- Invoked against fever, rats, and mice, particularly field-mice – Gertrude of Nivelles
- Fever – Hugh of Cluny
- Invoked against fever; afflictions associated with the eyes; Dry cough; infertility; panic attacks – Theobald of Provins
- Invoked against fire, floods and drowning – Florian
- Invoked against flooding, and for the good success of Caesarean section – Caesarius of Terracina

== G ==
- Against gallstones, colic – Liborius of Le Mans
- Invoked against illegal gambling – Cajetan
- Diseases and sicknesses affecting the genitals – Vitalis of Assisi
- Gout, sore throat, fever, whooping cough – Andrew the Apostle
- Gout – Apollinaris

== H ==
- Pathologies of the hands and the feet – Julia of Corsica
- Against hanging – Coloman
- Hangovers – Bibiana
- Against headache – Agathius, Teresa of Ávila, Bibiana, Crescentinus, Denis of Paris, William Firmatus,
- Heart disease – John of God
- Haemorrhage, eye complaints – Lucy of Syracuse
- Against hernias – Conrad of Piacenza
- The homeless – Benedict Joseph Labre, Nicholas of Trani, Peter of Saint Joseph de Betancur
- Sick horses – Hippolytus of Rome

== I ==
- Patron of immigrants, migrant workers, separated families – Lorenzo Ruiz
- Invoked against infertility – Maturinus
- Female infertility (in Syria) – Abd-al-Masih
- Against infestations of bedbugs, rodents and locusts – Tryphon
- Against insanity, mental disorders – Bibiana, Christina the Astonishing
- Against insomnia and other sleep disorders and difficulties – Peter Damian

== K ==
- Against kidnapping, illness – Arthelais
- Kidney disease, and rheumatism – Ursus of Aosta
- Diseases of the kidneys, invoked against physical defects, back pains, and school-related students' crises – Nonnosus

== L ==
- Leprosy, HIV and AIDS – Damien of Molokai, Evmenios Saridakis
- Against lightning; fear of insects – Gratus of Aosta
- Invoked against lightning – Victor of Marseilles
- Lost causes, desperate situations – Jude Thaddaeus
- Lost causes or impossible cases, marital problems, abuse – Rita of Cascia
- Missing people and lost things – Anthony of Padua

== M ==
- Difficult marriage – Olaf, Godelieve
- Mental illness – Bibiana, Fillan, Hermes, Dymphna
- Migraine – Aspren, Gereon

== N ==
- Invoked as a protector from natural disasters, plague, invasion – Leoluca
- Invoked against stiff neck – Ursicinus of Saint-Ursanne
- Neuralgia, sick children, obsessive compulsive disorder – Ubald
- Nyctophobia – Cannera

== P ==
- Chronic pain – Pacificus of San Severino
- Patron saint against pandemics – Edmund the Martyr of East Anglia
- Invoked as protection against perjury, loss at sea and destructive rains – Maximin of Trier
- Against pirate attack – Albinus of Angers
- Plague, epilepsy – Adrian of Nicomedia
- Against plague – Sebastian
- Plague, epilepsy – Natalia of Nicomedia
- Bubonic plague, misfortunes – Agricola of Avignon
- Bubonic plague or the Black Death – Fourteen Holy Helpers
- Invoked against the bubonic plague, smallpox, and gout – Quirinus of Neuss
- Pneumonia - Casimiro Barello Morello
- Poverty – Macrina the Elder
- Against poverty, impoverishment, torture victims – Regina
- Pregnancy – Gerard Majella
- Invoked against procrastination – Expeditus
- The souls in purgatory – John Macias

== R ==
- Rabies – Domninus of Fidenza
- Rabies – Hubert of Liège
- Against rabies – Quiteria –
- Invoked against rabies – Sithney
- Victims of rape – Clementina Nengapeta
- Victims of rape, crime victims, invoked against pedophiles – Maria Goretti
- Rape victims – Potamiana
- Against venomous reptiles – Abhai
- Invoked against snakes, and snake bites; also invoked against demonic possession, mental illness, poison, wild beasts – Amabilis of Riom
- Against snake bites – Peregrine of Auxerre
- Respiratory diseases – Dositheus of Gaza
- Rheumatism – James the Great
- Maurus – rheumatism, gout, epilepsy
- Against rheumatism – Miliau
- People ridiculed for their piety, repentance, temptation – Mary Magdalene
- Politicians, athletes, road safety – Alberto Marvelli

== S ==
- Invoked against sciatica – Dometius of Persia
- Those who suffer scoliosis, against animal attacks – Joseph of Anchieta
- Scrofula – Saint Balbina
- Scrofula, diseases of the skin – Marculf
- Against danger at sea, against temptations, sick people, storms at sea, police officers – Michael the Archangel
- For protection against the dangers of the sea – Wulfram of Sens
- Against sepsis – John Henry Newman
- The sick, asthma sufferers, nurses and carers – Bernadette
- Those who serve the sick – Peter of Saint Joseph de Betancur
- Skin disease, Saint Anthony's fire – Anthony
- Skin diseases, victims of child abuse – Germaine Cousin
- Sleepwalking, epilepsy, insanity, mental illness – Dymphna
- Smallpox – Matthias
- Invoked against stomach pains, especially in children – Rasso
- Invoked against storms, hail storms, lightning – Eurosia
- Stress relief and New year blues – Saint Pio of Pietrelcina
- Invoked against stress – Walter of Pontoise
- Students, youth – John Berchmans
- Sudden death – Andrew Avellino
- Syphilis, eye troubles – Symphorian

== T ==
- Ailments of the throat – Blaise
- Throat trouble – Godelina
- Against thunderstorm, evil spirits, and plague – Deodatus of Nevers
- Toothache – Apollonia
- Invoked against toothache – Engelmund of Velsen
- Toothache – Medard
- Stenographers, printers, lawyers, epileptics, thieves, torture victims – Genesius of Rome
- Travelers facing hardships -- Saint Raphael
- People seeking relief from tribulations, in particular by women who wished to be liberated from abusive husbands – Wilgefortis

== V ==
- Venereal disease sufferers, hemorrhoids – Fiacre

== W ==
- Protector of soldiers against the dangers of war; also invoked for fertility – St. Bessus
- Whooping cough – Winnoc
- Invoked against wolves and fires – Defendens
- Invoked to cure wounds – Marciana of Mauretania
- Curing of wounds – Marciana of Toledo
- To cure open wounds, against eye diseases – Reinildis

== See also ==
- Patron saints of occupations and activities
- Patron saints of places
- Patronage of the Blessed Virgin Mary
