= Severus of Vienne =

Indian-born French saint

Saint Severus of Vienne
- Born: India
- Died: c. 455 A.D. Italy
- Feast: 8 August
- Attributes: Holding a devil in a chain
- Patronage: Vienne, Saint-Sève

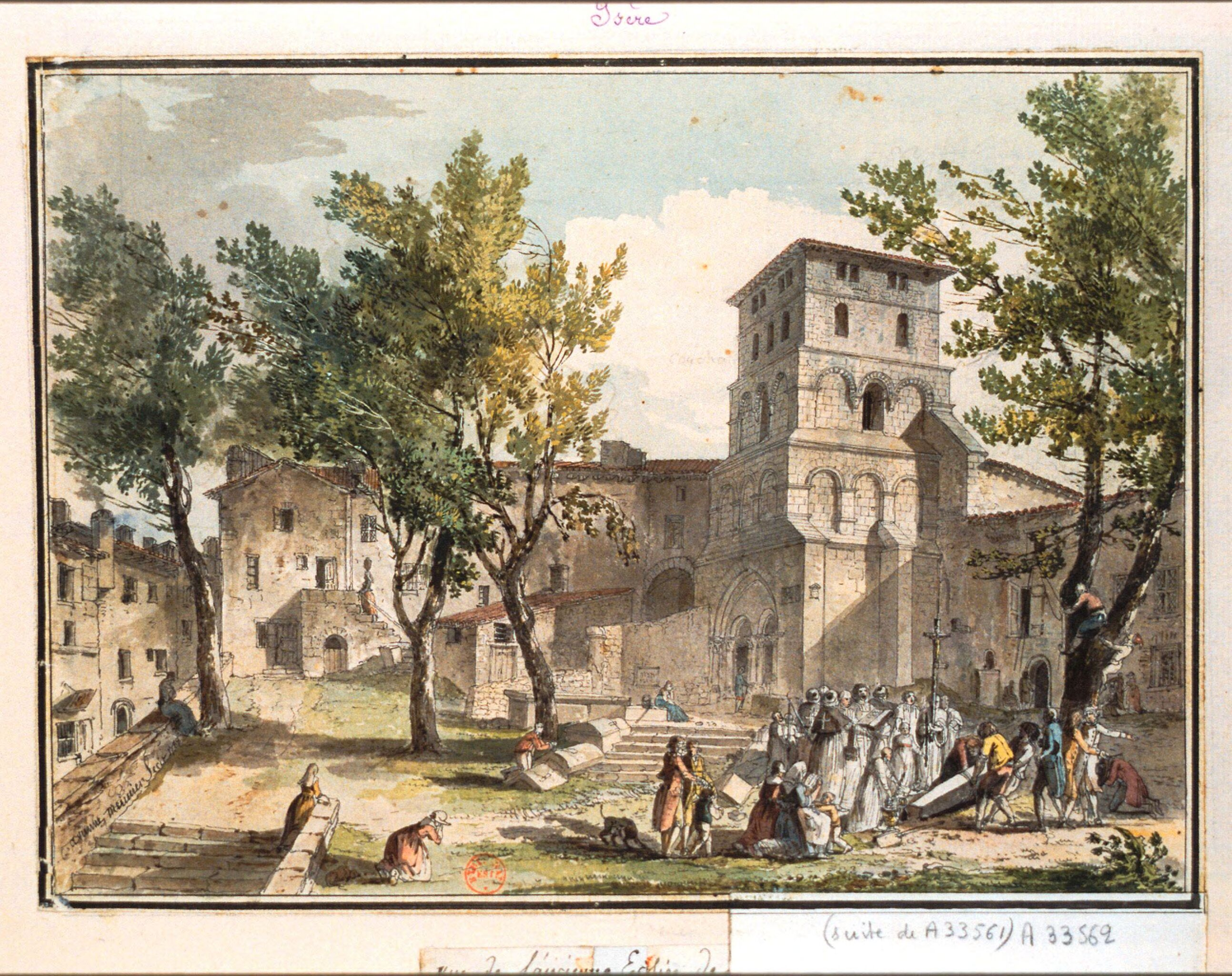
A painting of the old church of St. Severus of Vienne from 1788

Severus of Vienne (died c. 455) was a priest who evangelised in Vienne, France. He is venerated as a saint in the Catholic Church as well as in other denominations. (Note: In principle, those recognised as saints prior to 1050 are common to the Catholic and Orthodox churches, so Severus of Vienne is an Orthodox saint too.) Severus was reportedly Indian by birth and of wealthy origins. His entry in the Roman Martyrology reads:

"At Vienne, in France, St. Severus, priest and confessor, who undertook a painful journey from India in order to preach the Gospel in that city, and converted a great number of Pagans to the faith of Christ by his labors and miracles."

— The Roman Martyrology (1916), p. 237

Severus settled in Vienne around 430. He founded a church in honour of Saint Alban (now the church of Saint-Alban-du-Rhône) near Vienne. He died in Italy, but his body was brought back to Vienne and buried in the church dedicated to the protomartyr Saint Stephen, which he himself had constructed.
