= Anna Wang =

Catholic Saint

Saint Anna Wang 王亞納

Martyr
- Born: 1886; Majiazhuang, Hebei, China
- Died: 22 July 1900 (aged 13–14); Majiazhuang, Hebei, China
- Venerated in: Roman Catholic Church
- Beatified: 17 April 1955, Saint Peter's Square, Vatican City by Pope Pius XII
- Canonized: 1 October 2000, Saint Peter's Square, Vatican City by Pope John Paul II
- Feast: 22 July
- Patronage: China, Hong Kong, Singapore, Taiwan, Youth, Innocent, Chinese diaspora

Anna Wang (Chinese: 王亞納) was a Catholic lay girl who was martyred during the Boxer Rebellion. She was declared a saint by John Paul II. She is one of the Martyrs of China.

== Early life ==
Anna was born in 1886 in Majiazhuang, Hebei, China, to a poor Christian family. She lost her mother at five years old and was given a religious education by nun Lucy Wang. She was set to be married at eleven, but refused. She was a devout Catholic.

== Martyrdom ==
On July 21, 1900, a group of armed members of the Boxer Rebellion came to Anna's village to kill the Christians and burn down the church. The Boxers told each Christian to renounce their faith or die. Anna, along with a few other Christians, refused to renounce their faith. Anna and her companions were beheaded, and her body was dumped together with others in a mass grave. She was 14 years old. Her body was exhumed and given proper burial on November 6, 1901.

== Canonization ==
She was venerated by Pope Pius XII on 22 February 1955 and beatified on 17 April. She was canonized and declared a saint by Pope John Paul II along with other Martyrs of China on 1 October 2000.
