= Barbatus of Benevento =

Lombard Christian bishop, c. 610–682

Saint Barbatus of Benevento

Apostle of the Lombards
- Born: c. 610; Cerreto Sannita, Italy
- Died: 682
- Venerated in: Roman Catholic Church; Eastern Orthodox Church
- Major shrine: The Cathedral of Benevento, where his relics have been preserved beneath the main altar since 1687
- Feast: February 19
- Attributes: Crozier
- Patronage: Benevento

Barbatus of Benevento (Italian: San Barbato) (c. 610 – February 19, 682), also known as Barbas, was a bishop of Benevento from 663 to 682. He succeeded Ildebrand in this capacity. He assisted in a church council called by Pope Agatho in Rome in 680 and in 681 attended the Third Council of Constantinople against the Monothelites.

== Biography ==
He was born in the village of Vandano, near Cerreto Sannita, then part of the Duchy of Benevento, toward the end of the papacy of Gregory the Great. At that time, Benevento had recently (in 590) been captured by Arian Lombards from the Trinitarian Romans.

According to the ninth century vitae, he received a Christian education, and spent a good deal of time studying the Christian scriptures. He took holy orders as soon as allowed to do so, and was immediately employed by the local bishop as a preacher, a task for which he had considerable talent. Shortly thereafter, he was made the curate of St. Basil's Church in nearby Morcone, where his preaching was not well received by indifferent parishioners only nominally Christian. He continued his calls for reform but eventually returned to Benevento, where he was welcomed back by those who remembered him from earlier.

At the time, the people of Benevento still entertained some idolatrous superstitions, including veneration of a golden viper and a local walnut tree. The local Lombard prince, Romuald I son of the Arian Lombard King Grimoald I, was himself involved in these activities. Barbatus regularly preached against them only to be ignored. Later, he warned the people of the city of the great trials they would soon suffer at the hands of the East Roman Emperor Constans II and his army, who shortly thereafter landed in the area and laid siege to Benevento. The people, in their fear, renounced the practices Barbatus had criticized. He then cut down the tree the locals had worshipped, and melted the viper into a chalice for use in the church.

Barbatus himself was responsible for a practical form of resistance to Constans. In 1903 the foundations of the Temple of Isis were discovered close to the Arch of Trajan in Benevento, and many fragments of fine sculptures in both the Egyptian and the Greco-Roman style belonging to it were found. They had apparently been used as the foundation of a portion of the city wall, reconstructed in 663 under the fear of an attack by Constans, the temple having been destroyed by order of Barbatus to provide the necessary material.

The presiding bishop of Benevento, Ildebrand, died during the siege, which ended as Barbatus had foretold, with the defeat of Constans. After the withdrawal of the invaders, Barbatus was made bishop on March 10, 663 and continued his efforts to eliminate superstition. In 673 Duke Romuald placed the grotto of St. Michael at Gargano under the care of Barbatus.

In 680, he assisted in a council held by Pope Agatho, and took part in the sixth general council held in Constantinople in 681 regarding the Monothelites. He died shortly after the end of the council, on 19 February 682, at about seventy years of age.

Barbatus is commemorated on February 19. The Roman Martyrology lists Barbatus as one of the chief patrons of the city of Benevento. He is also the patron of Cicciano, Castelvenere, Casalattico and Valle dell'Angelo.

== See also ==
- Arthelais
- Saint Barbatus of Benevento, patron saint archive

== Sources ==
- Nicholas Everett, Patron Saints of Early Medieval Italy AD c.350-800 (PIMS/ Durham University Press, 2016), pp.39-59
