= Arthelais =

Christian child saint (544–560)

Saint Arthelais
- Born: 544 AD; Constantinople (modern-day Istanbul, Turkey)
- Died: 560 AD
- Venerated in: Roman Catholic Church
- Feast: 3 March
- Patronage: Benevento; kidnap victims, illness, people in exile, sick people, sickness

Arthelais (Italian: Sant' Artellaide) (544–560) is venerated as a Christian saint. She is one of the patron saints of Benevento, with Barbatus of Benevento and Bartholomew being the others. Her feast day is 3 March.

== Narrative ==
A legend has Arthelais as a native of Constantinople, the daughter of an imperial proconsul named Lucius and his wife Anthusa. She is said to have been pursued by Justinian, who desired her; however, Arthelais had taken a vow of chastity. At her own request, she was sent with three servants to her uncle Narses in Italy, but was kidnapped by robbers along the way. Her servants had recourse to the Church of Saint Eulalia, where they prayed for their mistress' safe return, and gave alms to the poor from their expense money.

The robbers intended to sell their captive for immoral purposes, but an angel slew the gaoler (jailer) and freed her. The devil seized the rest of the robbers. Arthelais soon met her servants, and they proceeded to Siponto. From there she went to the Sanctuary of Monte Sant'Angelo to make an offering in thanksgiving. Her uncle Narses went to meet her and brought her back to Benevento. Here she settled and lived in prayer and piety exercises, working many miracles. Stricken by fever, she was transported to the church of San Luca, where she died at the age of seventeen. Her relics were later transferred to the Cattedrale metropolitana di Santa Maria de Episcopio.
