= Patron saints of ethnic groups =

== Europe ==
- Andalusians: St. John of Ávila, Virgin of Hope of Macarena.
- Austrians: St. Leopold the Good, Saint Joseph.
- Basques: St. Ignatius of Loyola.
- Bosnians: St. Elijah.
- Bretons: St. Ivo of Kermartin.
- Bulgarians: St. John of Rila.
- Canarians: Our Lady of Candelaria, St. Peter of Saint Joseph de Betancur.
- Catalans: St. George.
- Cornish: St. Piran, St Petroc.
- Croats: St. Joseph.
- Czechs: St. Wenceslas.
- Danes: St. Canute.
- Dutch: St. Willibrord.
- English: St. George; Our Lady of Walsingham; Edward the Confessor; Edward the Martyr; Michael the Archangel.
- Finns: St. Henry bishop of Finland.
- French: St. Joan of Arc; St. Denis, St. Martin of Tours.
- Flemings: Saint Walpurga.
- Gaels: St Columba, St. Brigid of Kildare
- Galicians: St. James the Great.
- Germans: Archangel Michael.
- Greeks: St. Nicholas.
- Greek Cypriots: Barnabas, and Lazarus of Bethany.
- Hungarians: St. Stephen of Hungary.
- Irish: St. Patrick, St Bridget.
- Italians: St. Francis of Assisi and St. Catherine of Siena.
- Lithuanians: St. Casimir.
- Macedonians: St. Clement of Ohrid.
- Maltese: St. Paul.
- Manx: St. Maughold.
- Monégasques: St. Devota.
- Norwegians: St. Olaf.
- Poles: St. Stanislaus Kostka. St. Andrew Bobola.
- Portuguese: St. Anthony of Padua, Our Lady of Fatima.
- Romanians: St. Andrew.
- Romani people: Saint Sarah, Blessed Ceferino Giménez Malla.
- Russians: St. Andrew, St. Nicholas.
- Sardinian: St. Antiochus of Sulcis, Our Lady of Bonaria
- Scots: St. Andrew. St. Margaret, St. Columba
- Serbs: St. Sava, Stefan Nemanja.
- Sicilians: Agatha of Sicily, Saint Rosalia.
- Spaniards: St. James the Great.
- Spanish Romani: Virgin of Hope of Macarena, Blessed Ceferino Giménez Malla.
- Swedes: St. Bridget.
- Ukrainians: Vladimir the Great.
- Walloons: Saint Michael the Archangel.
- Welsh: St. David.

== Africa ==
- Amharas and Tigrayans: St. George.
- Berbers: St. Cyprian.
- Copts: St. Mark.
- Dafurian: St. Josephine Bakhita
- Kongo people: St. Anthony of Padua.
- Maghrebis: St. Cyprian.
- Malagasy people: Vincent de Paul.
- Sudanese and South Sudanese: St. Josephine Bakhita

== Asia ==
- Arabs: St. Sergius and Bacchus.
- Armenians: St. Gregory the Illuminator.
- Assyrians: St. Ephrem the Syrian, St. Zayya, Saint Mari, Addai of Edessa, Ephrem the Syrian.
- Bicolanos: Our Lady of Peñafrancia.
- Chinese Christians: Saint Joseph.
- Chinese Filipinos: St. Lorenzo Ruiz.
- Druze people: Jethro, Elijah or St. George (identified as Al-Khidr).
- Georgians: St. George.
- Goan Catholics: Francis Xavier.
- Japanese Christians: Francis Xavier.
- Jewish Christians: James the Just.
- Korean Christians: Saint Joseph.
- Maronites: St. Maron.
- Kapampangans: Virgen de los Remedios de Pampanga.
- Lebanese Christians: Saint George.
- Lebanese people: St. Charbel Makhlouf, Rafqa Pietra Choboq Ar-Rayès, Nimatullah Kassab.
- Palestinian Christians: Saint George.
- Pangasinense: Our Lady of Manaoag.
- Persian people: Addai of Edessa, Saint Mari.
- Singaporean Christians: Francis Xavier.
- Syrian Christians: Saint George.
- Syrian Christians of Kerala: Saint Thomas the Apostle.
- Turks: John the Apostle.
- Vietnamese Christians: Saint Joseph.

== America ==
- African Americans: Saint Benedict the Moor.
- Afro-Caribbeans: Peter Claver.
- Argentines: Our Lady of Luján.
- Bolivians: Virgen de Copacabana.
- Brazilians: Our Lady of Aparecida.
- Chileans: Our Lady of Mount Carmel.
- Colombians: Our Lady of the Rosary of Chiquinquirá, Peter Claver.
- Costa Ricans: Virgen de los Ángeles.
- Cubans: Our Lady of Charity.
- Dominicans: Virgin of Altagracia, Saint Dominic.
- Ecuadorians: Mariana de Jesús de Paredes.
- Euro-Americans: the Immaculate Conception, (unofficial:) Our Lady of America.
- French Canadians: St. John the Baptist.
- Guatemalans: Our Lady of the Rosary.
- Haitians: Our Lady of Perpetual Help.
- Hispanic people and the Hispanic world: Our Lady of the Pillar.
- Hondurans: Our Lady of Suyapa.
- Indigenous peoples of the Americas: St. Juan Diego.
- Mexicans: Our Lady of Guadalupe.
- Nicaraguans: Immaculate Conception.
- Panamanians: Virgen de la Antigua.
- Paraguayans: Our Lady of Caacupé.
- Peruvians: Lord of Miracles, Rose of Lima.
- Puerto Ricans: St. John the Baptist, Our Lady of Providence.
- Salvadorans: Our Lady of Peace.
- Uruguayans: Virgin of the Thirty-Three.
- Venezuelans: Our Lady of Coromoto, José Gregorio Hernández.

== Oceania ==
- Australians: Mary MacKillop, Our Lady Help of Christians
- Hawaiians: Father Damien, Malia O Ka Malu (Our Lady of Peace)
- New Zealanders: Our Lady Help of Christians
- Rapa Nui: Santa María de Rapa Nui (Our Lady of Rapa Nui)

== See also ==
- Patron saints of places
