= Saint-Sève =

- Commune
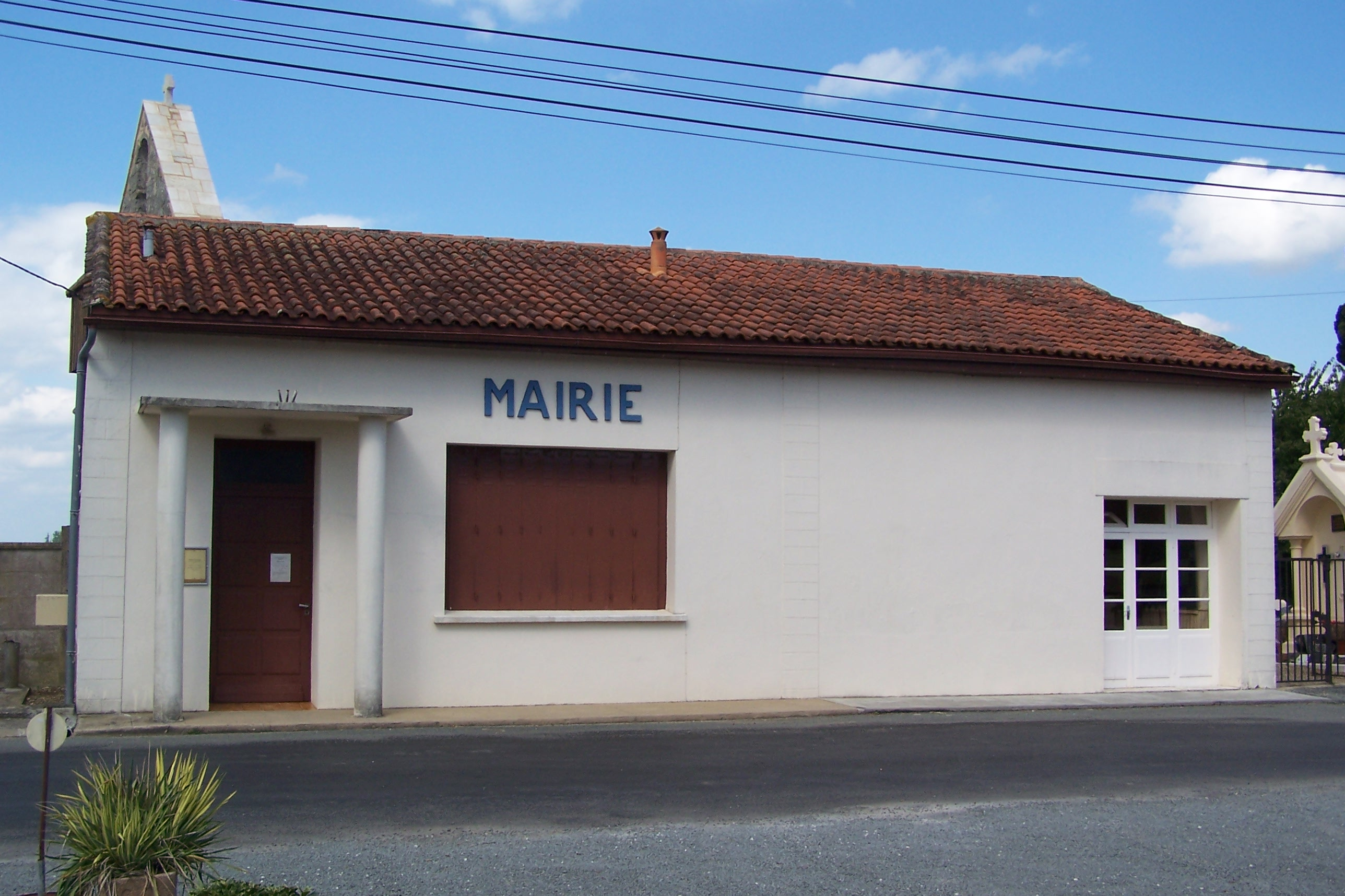
- Town hall

- Coat of arms
- Location of Saint-Sève
- Location within France Location within Nouvelle-Aquitaine
- Coordinates: 44°36′38″N 0°01′41″W
- Country: France
- Region: Nouvelle-Aquitaine
- Department: Gironde
- Arrondissement: Langon
- Canton: Le Réolais et Les Bastides
- Intercommunality: Réolais en Sud Gironde

Government
  - Mayor (2020–2026): Eliam Ardouin
- Area^{1}: 4.8 km^{2} (1.9 sq mi)
- Elevation: 54 m (177 ft)
- Highest elevation: 122 m (400 ft)
- Lowest elevation: 29 m (95 ft)
- Population (2023): 251
  - Density: 52/km^{2} (140/sq mi)
- Time zone: UTC+01:00 (CET)
  - Summer (DST): UTC+02:00 (CEST)
- INSEE/Postal code: 33479 /33190
- ^{1} French Land Register data, which excludes lakes, ponds, glaciers > 1 km^{2} (0.386 sq mi or 247 acres) and river estuaries.

Saint-Sève (French pronunciation: [sɛ̃ sɛv]; Gascon: Sent Sèver) is a commune in the Gironde department in Nouvelle-Aquitaine in southwestern France.

== Population ==
Historical population
Year	Pop.	±% p.a.
1968	175	—
1975	130	−4.16%
1982	150	+2.07%
1990	177	+2.09%
1999	193	+0.97%
2007	207	+0.88%
2012	224	+1.59%
2017	254	+2.55%
2023	251	−0.20%
Source: INSEE

== See also ==
- Communes of the Gironde department
