= Patron saint =

Saint regarded as a heavenly advocate

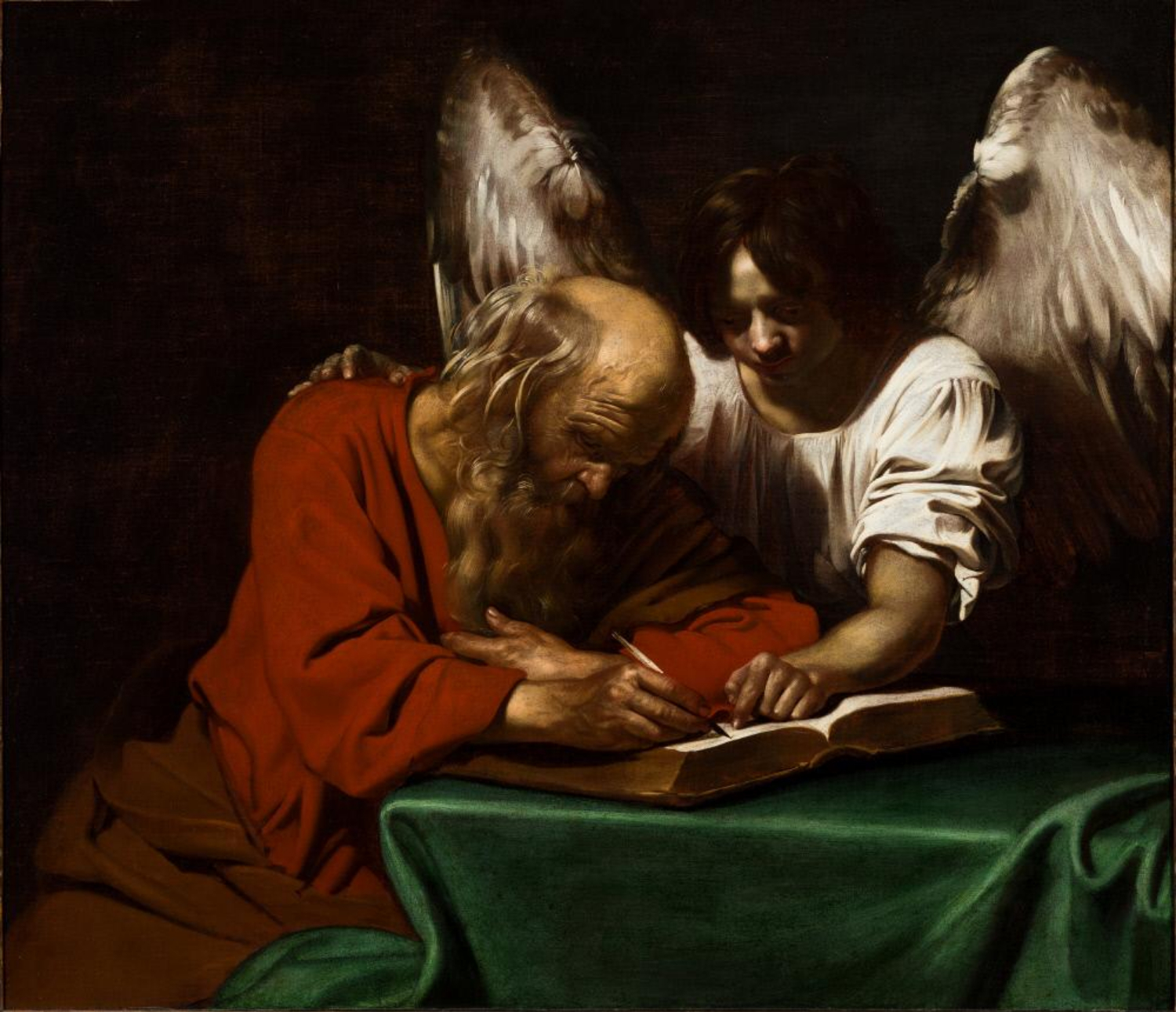
Saint Matthew the Apostle, depicted by Nicolas Régnier, is the patron saint of Salerno, Italy, bankers, and tax collectors.

A patron saint, patroness saint, patron hallow or heavenly protector is a saint who in Catholicism, Anglicanism, Eastern Orthodoxy or Oriental Orthodoxy is regarded as the heavenly advocate of a nation, place, craft, activity, class, clan, family, or person.

The term may be applied to individuals to whom similar roles are ascribed in other religions.

== In Christianity ==
Saints often become the patrons of places where they were born or had been active. However, there were cases in medieval Europe where a city which grew to prominence obtained for its cathedral the remains or some relics of a famous saint who had lived and was buried elsewhere, thus making them the city's patron saint – such a practice conferred considerable prestige on the city concerned. In Latin America and the Philippines, Spanish and Portuguese explorers often named a location for the saint on whose feast or commemoration day they first visited the place, with that saint naturally becoming the area's patron.

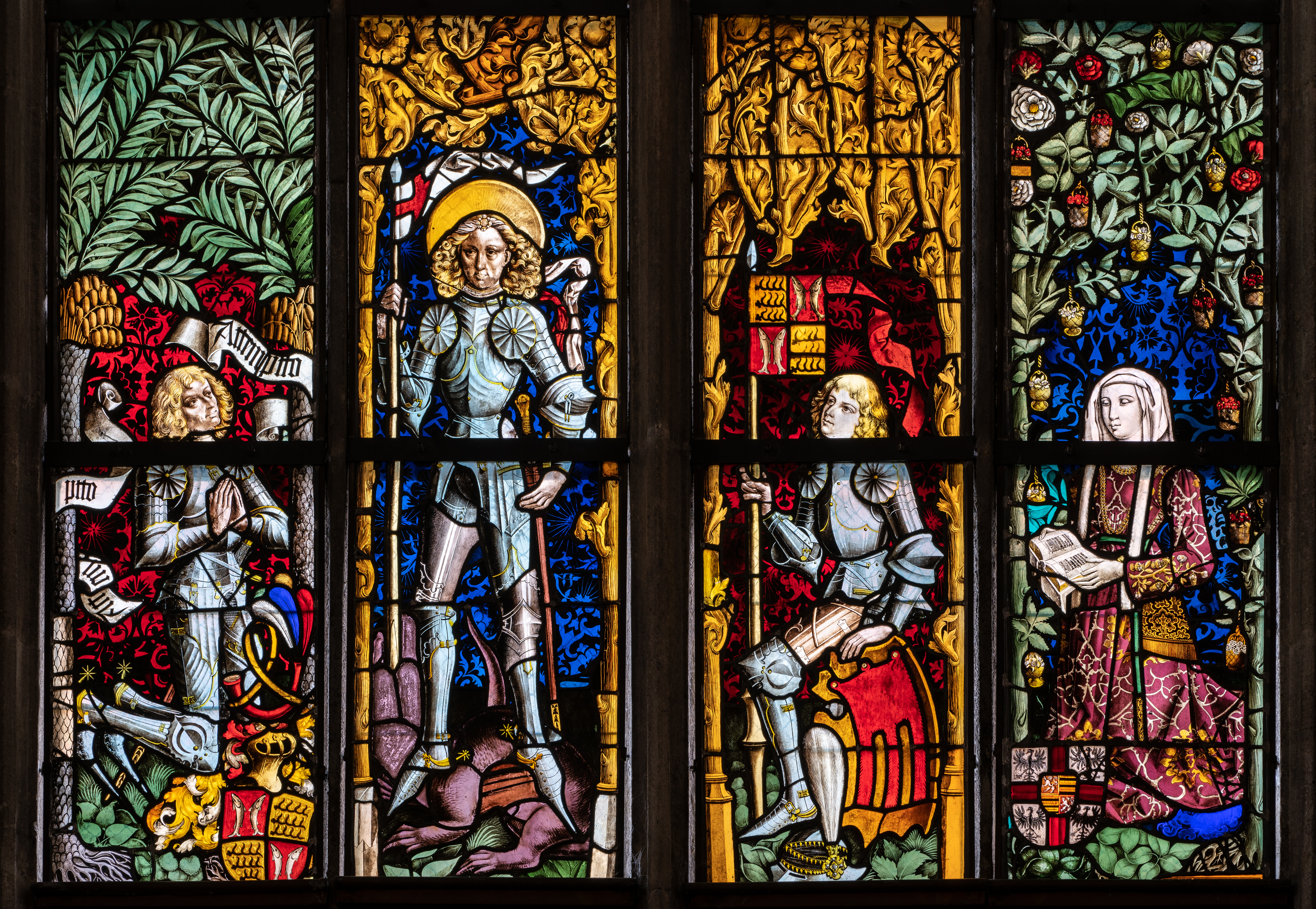

Some occupations have a patron saint associated with them whose acts or miracles in some way recall the profession. For example, when photography emerged in the 19th century, Saint Veronica became its patron saint, owing to how her veil miraculously received the imprint of Christ's face after she wiped off the blood and sweat.

The veneration or commemoration and recognition of patron saints or saints in general is found in Catholicism (including Eastern Catholicism), Eastern Orthodoxy, Oriental Orthodoxy, and among some Lutherans and Anglicans. According to the Catholic catechism a person's patron saint, having already attained the beatific vision, is able to intercede with God for their needs.

Apart from Lutheranism and Anglicanism, it is, however, generally discouraged in other Protestant branches, such as Reformed Christianity, where the practice is considered a form of idolatry.

=== Catholicism ===
A saint can be assigned as a patron by a venerable tradition, or chosen by election. The saint is considered a special intercessor with God and the proper advocate of a particular locality, occupation, etc., and merits a special form of religious observance. A term in some ways comparable is "titular", which is applicable only to a church or institution.

== In Islam ==
Although Islam has no codified doctrine of patronage on the part of saints, it has nevertheless been an important part of both Sunni and Shia Islamic traditions that particularly important classical saints have served as the heavenly advocates for specific Muslim empires, nations, cities, towns, and villages. Martin Lings wrote: "There is scarcely a region in the empire of Islam which has not a Sufi for its Patron Saint." As the veneration accorded saints often develops purely organically in Islamic climates, in a manner different from Catholic and Eastern Orthodox Christianity, "patron saints" are often recognized through popular acclaim rather than through official declaration. Traditionally, it has been understood that the patron saint of a particular place prays for that place's wellbeing and for the health and happiness of all who live therein.

However, the Wahhabi and Salafi movements have latterly attacked the veneration of saints (as patron or otherwise), which they claim are a form of idolatry or shirk. More mainstream Sunni clerics have critiqued this argument since Wahhabism first emerged in the 18th century.

== In Druze faith ==
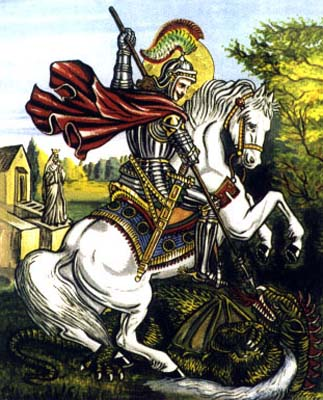
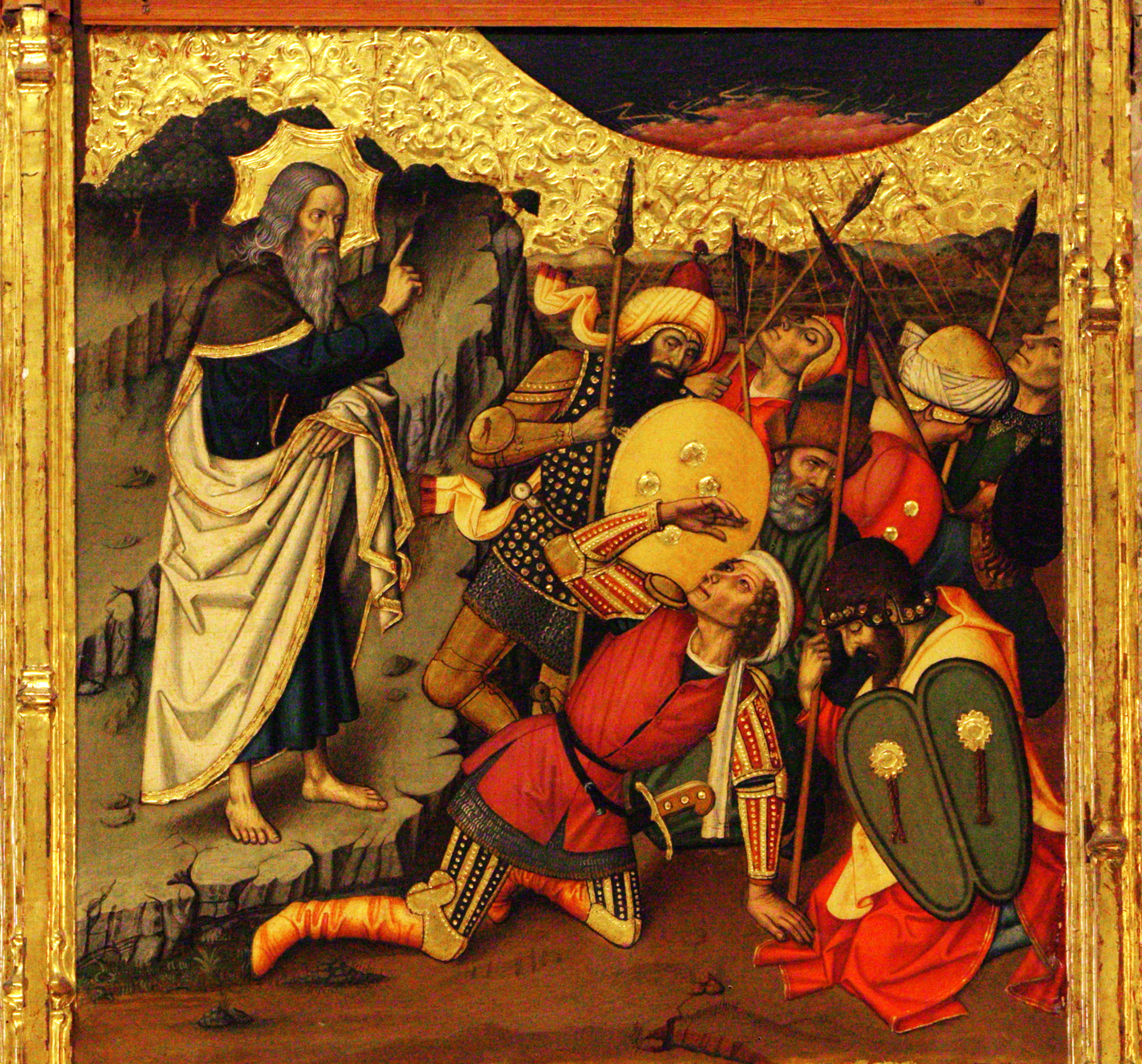
Patron saints of the Druze: Saint George (left) and Saint Elijah (right)

Elijah and Jethro (Shuaib) are considered patron saints of the Druze people. In the Old Testament, Jethro was Moses' father-in-law, a Kenite shepherd and priest of Midian. Muslim scholars and the Druze identify Jethro with the prophet Shuaib, also said to come from Midian. Shuaib or Jethro of Midian is considered an ancestor of the Druze who revere him as their spiritual founder and chief prophet.

Druze identify Elijah as "al-Khidr". Druze believe that the Prophet Elijah came back as Saint John the Baptist, since they believe in reincarnation and the transmigration of the soul, Druze believe that El Khidr and Saint John the Baptist are one and the same; along with Saint George.

Due to the Christian influence on the Druze faith, two Christian saints become the Druze's favorite venerated figures: Saint George and Saint Elijah. Thus, in all the villages inhabited by Druzes and Christians in central Mount Lebanon a Christian church or Druze maqam is dedicated to either one of them. According to scholar Ray Jabre Mouawad the Druzes appreciated the two saints for their bravery: Saint George because he confronted the dragon and the Prophet Elijah because he competed with and defeated the pagan priests of Baal. In both cases the explanations provided by Christians is that Druzes were attracted to warrior saints that resemble their own militarized society.

== In Eastern religions ==
In Hinduism, certain sects may devote themselves to the veneration of a saint, such as the Balmiki sect that reveres Valmiki.

Buddhism also includes the idea of protector deities, which are called "Dharma protectors" (Dharmapala).

== See also ==
- Calendar of saints
- Dedication of churches
- City God (China)
- Guardian angel
- List of blesseds
- List of saints
- Patron saints of ailments, illness, and dangers
- Patron saints of occupations and activities
- Patron saints of places
- Patron saints of ethnic groups
- Military saints
- Saint symbolism
- Tutelary deity
