= August 19 =

August 19 this year in various calendars
- Wednesday, 19 August 2026
Akan	Kwawukuo
Armenian	30 Nawasardi 1476
Aztec	Atemoztli 1, 1 Ātl
Babylonian	5 Abu, 2337 SE
Balinese pawukon	Menga, Beteng, Jaya, Pon, Was, Buda of Medangkungan, Kala, Tulus, Sri
Bengali	4 Bhadro, BS 1433
Chinese	Yin Wood Ox・Chariot Mansion; Fire Horse Year, Month 7, Day 7 (Liqiu, 4 days until Chushu)
Common Era	19 August 2026 CE
Coptic	13 Mesori, AM 1742
Egyptian	5 Tybi, 2775 NE
Ethiopian	13 Naḥasē, 2018 Amätä Məhrät
French Republican	Décade I, Duodi de Fructidor de l'Année 234 de la République
Gregorian	19 August, AD 2026
Hebrew	6 Elul, AM 5786
Hindu	Svātī・Śukla; Solar: 3 Bhādrapada, 1948 SE; Lunisolar: Saptamī, Śukla pakṣa of Śrāvaṇa, 2083 VE; Rāudra・5127 KY・1,872,806
Icelandic	Miðvikudagur, 25 Heyannir 2026
Islamic	5 Rabi' al-awwal, AH 1448 (using tabular method)
ISO week date	2026-W34-3
Japanese	7 Fumizuki, Reiwa 8 (Risshū, 4 days until Shosho)
Julian	6 August, AD 2026 (AM 7534)
Julian day	2461272
Korean	7 Wonsungidal, 4359 DE
Maya	13.0.13.15.9; 2 Mol, 1 Muluc
Roman	ante diem VIII Idus Augustas, MMDCCLXXIX AUC
Solar Hijri	28 Mordad, SH 1405
Tibetan	7 gro bzhin, me pho rta 2153 or 1772 or 1000

<<	August					>>
Su	Mo	Tu	We	Th	Fr	Sa
						1
2	3	4	5	6	7	8
9	10	11	12	13	14	15
16	17	18	19	20	21	22
23	24	25	26	27	28	29
30	31
2026

August 19 in recent years
2026 (Wednesday)
2025 (Tuesday)
2024 (Monday)
2023 (Saturday)
2022 (Friday)
2021 (Thursday)
2020 (Wednesday)
2019 (Monday)
2018 (Sunday)
2017 (Saturday)

August 19 is the 231st day of the year (232nd in leap years) in the Gregorian calendar; 134 days remain until the end of the year.

== Events ==
=== Pre-1600 ===
- 295 BC – The first temple to Venus, the Roman goddess of love, beauty and fertility, is dedicated by Quintus Fabius Maximus Gurges during the Third Samnite War.
- 43 BC – In the wake of the murder of Julius Caesar, his nephew and heir, Octavian, uses the threat of military force to compel the Roman Senate to elect him Consul.
- 797 – Byzantine Emperor Constantine VI is seized by supporters of his mother Irene, deposed and blinded.
- 947 – Abu Yazid, a Kharijite rebel leader, is defeated and killed in the Hodna Mountains in modern-day Algeria by Fatimid forces.
- 1153 – After a six-month siege, Baldwin III of Jerusalem captures Ascalon, obtaining a vast amount of plunder and securing the southern border of the Kingdom of Jerusalem.
- 1274 – Coronation of Edward I of England.
- 1458 – Pope Pius II is elected the 211th Pope.
- 1504 – In Ireland, the Hiberno-Norman de Burghs (Burkes) and Cambro-Norman Fitzgeralds fight in the Battle of Knockdoe.
- 1561 – Mary, Queen of Scots, aged 18, returns to Scotland after spending 13 years in France.

=== 1601–1900 ===
- 1604 – Eighty Years War: a besieging Dutch and English army led by Maurice of Orange forces the Spanish garrison of Sluis to capitulate.
- 1659 – Parliamentarian forces under John Lambert defeat Royalist forces under George Booth in the battle of Winnington Bridge, ending Booth's Uprising.
- 1666 – Second Anglo-Dutch War: Rear Admiral Robert Holmes leads a raid on the Dutch island of Terschelling, destroying 116 to 160 merchant ships, an act later known as "Holmes's Bonfire".
- 1691 – An Imperial army under Ludwig of Baden defeats the Ottomans in the battle of Slankamen.
- 1692 – Salem witch trials: In Salem, province of Massachusetts Bay, Martha Carrier, George Jacobs Sr., John Proctor, John Willard, and clergyman George Burroughs are executed after being convicted of witchcraft.
- 1725 – J. S. Bach leads the first performance of Lobe den Herren, den mächtigen König der Ehren, BWV 137, a cantata setting the unchanged text of Neander's hymn.
- 1745 – Prince Charles Edward Stuart raises his standard in Glenfinnan: The start of the Second Jacobite Rebellion, known as "the 45".
- 1745 – Ottoman–Persian War: In the Battle of Kars, the Ottoman army is routed by Persian forces led by Nader Shah.
- 1759 – Battle of Lagos: Naval battle during the Seven Years' War between Great Britain and France.
- 1772 – Gustav III of Sweden stages a coup d'état, in which he assumes power and enacts a new constitution that divides power between the Riksdag and the King.
- 1782 – American Revolutionary War: Battle of Blue Licks: The last major engagement of the war, almost ten months after the surrender of the British commander Charles Cornwallis following the Siege of Yorktown.
- 1787 – Sultan Abdul Hamid I declares war against the Russian Empire in an effort to regain territories lost in previous conflicts, starting the Russo-Turkish War of 1787–1792.
- 1812 – War of 1812: American frigate USS Constitution defeats the British frigate HMS Guerriere off the coast of Nova Scotia, Canada earning the nickname "Old Ironsides".
- 1813 – Gervasio Antonio de Posadas joins Argentina's Second Triumvirate.
- 1839 – The French government announces that Louis Daguerre's photographic process is a gift "free to the world".
- 1848 – California Gold Rush: The New York Herald breaks the news to the East Coast of the United States of the gold rush in California (although the rush started in January).
- 1854 – The First Sioux War begins when United States Army soldiers kill Lakota chief Conquering Bear and in return are massacred.
- 1861 – First ascent of Weisshorn, fifth highest summit in the Alps.
- 1862 – Dakota War: During an uprising in Minnesota, Lakota warriors decide not to attack heavily defended Fort Ridgely and instead turn to the settlement of New Ulm, killing white settlers along the way.

=== 1901–present ===
- 1903 – The Transfiguration Uprising breaks out in East Thrace, resulting in the establishment of the Strandzha Commune.
- 1909 – The Indianapolis Motor Speedway opens for automobile racing. William Bourque and his mechanic are killed during the first day's events.
- 1920 – The Tambov Rebellion breaks out, in response to the Bolshevik policy of Prodrazvyorstka.
- 1927 – Patriarch Sergius of Moscow proclaims the declaration of loyalty of the Russian Orthodox Church to the Soviet Union.
- 1934 – The first All-American Soap Box Derby is held in Dayton, Ohio.
- 1934 – The German referendum of 1934 approves Adolf Hitler's appointment as head of state with the title of Führer.
- 1936 – The Great Purge of the Soviet Union begins when the first of the Moscow Trials is convened.
- 1940 – First flight of the B-25 Mitchell medium bomber.
- 1941 – Germany and Romania sign the Tiraspol Agreement, rendering the region of Transnistria under control of the latter.
- 1942 – World War II: Operation Jubilee (The Dieppe Raid): The 2nd Canadian Infantry Division leads an amphibious assault by allied forces on Dieppe, France and fails.
- 1944 – World War II: Liberation of Paris: Paris, France rises against German occupation with the help of Allied troops.
- 1945 – August Revolution: Viet Minh led by Ho Chi Minh take power in Hanoi, Vietnam.
- 1953 – Cold War: The CIA and MI6 help to overthrow the government of Mohammad Mosaddegh in Iran and reinstate the Shah Mohammad Reza Pahlavi.
- 1955 – In the Northeast United States, severe flooding caused by Hurricane Diane, claims 200 lives.
- 1960 – Cold War: In Moscow, Russia, Soviet Union, downed American U-2 pilot Francis Gary Powers is sentenced to ten years imprisonment by the Soviet Union for espionage.
- 1960 – Sputnik program: Korabl-Sputnik 2: The Soviet Union launches the satellite with the dogs Belka and Strelka, 40 mice, two rats and a variety of plants.
- 1964 – Syncom 3, the first geostationary communication satellite, is launched. Two months later, it would enable live coverage of the 1964 Summer Olympics.
- 1965 – Japanese prime minister Eisaku Satō becomes the first post-World War II sitting prime minister to visit Okinawa Prefecture.
- 1978 – In Iran, the Cinema Rex fire causes more than 300 deaths.
- 1980 – Saudia Flight 163, a Lockheed L-1011 TriStar burns after making an emergency landing at Riyadh International Airport in Riyadh, Saudi Arabia, killing 301 people.
- 1980 – Otłoczyn railway accident: In Poland's worst post-war railway accident, 67 people lose their lives and a further 62 are injured.
- 1981 – Gulf of Sidra Incident: United States F-14A Tomcat fighters intercept and shoot down two Libyan Sukhoi Su-22 fighter jets over the Gulf of Sidra.
- 1981 – Silvio Santos launches a new Brazilian television channel in São Paulo, Sistema Brasileiro de Televisão.
- 1987 – Hungerford massacre: In the United Kingdom, Michael Ryan kills sixteen people with a semi-automatic rifle and then commits suicide.
- 1989 – Polish president Wojciech Jaruzelski nominates Solidarity activist Tadeusz Mazowiecki to be the first non-communist prime minister in 42 years.
- 1989 – Several hundred East Germans cross the frontier between Hungary and Austria during the Pan-European Picnic, part of the events that began the process of the Fall of the Berlin Wall.
- 1991 – Dissolution of the Soviet Union: The August Coup begins when Soviet President Mikhail Gorbachev is placed under house arrest while on holiday in the town of Foros, Ukraine.
- 1991 – Crown Heights riot in New York City begins.
- 1999 – In Belgrade, Yugoslavia, tens of thousands of Serbians rally to demand the resignation of Federal Republic of Yugoslavia President Slobodan Milošević.
- 2002 – Khankala Mi-26 crash: A Russian Mil Mi-26 helicopter carrying troops is hit by a Chechen missile outside Grozny, killing 118 soldiers.
- 2003 – A truck-bomb attack on United Nations headquarters in Iraq kills the agency's top envoy Sérgio Vieira de Mello and 21 other employees.
- 2003 – Shmuel HaNavi bus bombing: A suicide attack on a bus in Jerusalem, planned by Hamas, kills 23 Israelis, seven of them children.
- 2004 – Google Inc. has its initial public offering on Nasdaq.
- 2005 – The first-ever joint military exercise between Russia and China, called Peace Mission 2005 begins.
- 2009 – A series of bombings in Baghdad, Iraq, kills 101 and injures 565 others.
- 2010 – Operation Iraqi Freedom ends, with the last of the United States brigade combat teams crossing the border to Kuwait.
- 2013 – The Dhamara Ghat train accident kills at least 37 people in the Indian state of Bihar.
- 2017 – Tens of thousands of farmed non-native Atlantic salmon are accidentally released into the wild in Washington waters in the 2017 Cypress Island Atlantic salmon pen break.

== Births ==
=== Pre-1600 ===
- 232 – Marcus Aurelius Probus, Roman emperor (died 282)
- 1342 – Catherine of Bohemia, duchess of Austria (died 1395)
- 1398 – Íñigo López de Mendoza, 1st Marquis of Santillana, Spanish poet and politician (died 1458)
- 1570 – Salamone Rossi, Italian violinist and composer (probable; (died 1630)
- 1583 – Daišan, Chinese prince and statesman (died 1648)
- 1590 – Henry Rich, 1st Earl of Holland, English soldier and politician, Lord Lieutenant of Berkshire (died 1649)
- 1596 – Elizabeth Stuart, queen of Bohemia (died 1662)

=== 1601–1900 ===
- 1609 – Jan Fyt, Flemish painter (died 1661)
- 1621 – Gerbrand van den Eeckhout, Dutch painter, etcher, and poet (died 1674)
- 1631 – John Dryden, English poet, literary critic and playwright (died 1700)
- 1646 – John Flamsteed, English astronomer and academic (died 1719)
- 1674 – František Maxmilián Kaňka, Czech architect (died 1766)
- 1686 – Eustace Budgell, English journalist and politician (died 1737)
- 1689 (baptized) – Samuel Richardson, English author and publisher (died 1761)
- 1700 – Bajirao I, 7th Peshwa of the Maratha Empire. (died 1740)
- 1711 – Edward Boscawen, English admiral and politician (died 1761)
- 1719 – Charles-François de Broglie, marquis de Ruffec, French soldier and diplomat (died 1781)
- 1743 – Madame du Barry, French mistress of Louis XV (died 1793)
- 1777 – Francis I, king of the Two Sicilies (died 1830)
- 1815 – Harriette Newell Woods Baker, American editor and children's book writer (died 1893)
- 1819 – Julius van Zuylen van Nijevelt, Luxembourger-Dutch politician, Prime Minister of the Netherlands (died 1894)
- 1830 – Julius Lothar Meyer, German chemist (died 1895)
- 1835 – Tom Wills, Australian cricketer and pioneer of Australian rules football (died 1880)
- 1843 – C. I. Scofield, American minister and theologian (died 1921)
- 1846 – Luis Martín, Spanish religious leader, 24th Superior General of the Society of Jesus (died 1906)
- 1848 – Gustave Caillebotte, French painter and engineer (died 1894)
- 1849 – Joaquim Nabuco, Brazilian politician and diplomat (died 1910)
- 1858 – Ellen Willmott, English horticulturalist (died 1934)
- 1870 – Bernard Baruch, American businessman and philanthropist (died 1965)
- 1871 – Orville Wright, American engineer and pilot, co-founded the Wright Company (died 1948)
- 1873 – Fred Stone, American actor and producer (died 1959)
- 1878 – Manuel L. Quezon, Filipino soldier, lawyer, and politician, 2nd President of the Philippines (died 1944)
- 1881 – George Enescu, Romanian violinist, pianist, composer, and conductor (died 1955)
- 1883 – Coco Chanel, French fashion designer, founded the Chanel Company (died 1971)
- 1883 – José Mendes Cabeçadas, Portuguese admiral and politician, 9th President of Portugal (died 1965)
- 1885 – Grace Hutchins, American labor reformer and researcher (died 1969)
- 1887 – S. Satyamurti, Indian lawyer and politician (died 1943)
- 1895 – C. Suntharalingam, Sri Lankan lawyer, academic, and politician (died 1985)
- 1899 – Colleen Moore, American actress (died 1988)
- 1900 – Gontran de Poncins, French author and adventurer (died 1962)
- 1900 – Gilbert Ryle, English philosopher, author, and academic (died 1976)
- 1900 – Dorothy Burr Thompson, American archaeologist and art historian (died 2001)

=== 1901–present ===
- 1902 – Ogden Nash, American poet (died 1971)
- 1903 – James Gould Cozzens, American novelist and short story writer (died 1978)
- 1906 – Philo Farnsworth, American inventor, invented the Fusor, key figure in the invention of television (died 1971)
- 1907 – Hazari Prasad Dwivedi, Indian historian, author, and scholar (died 1979)
- 1909 – Ronald King, New Zealand rugby player (died 1988)
- 1910 – Saint Alphonsa, first woman of Indian origin to be canonized as a saint by the Catholic Church (died 1946)
- 1911 – Anna Terruwe, Dutch psychiatrist and author (died 2004)
- 1912 – Herb Narvo, Australian rugby league player, coach, and boxer (died 1958)
- 1913 – John Argyris, Greek engineer and academic (died 2004)
- 1914 – Lajos Baróti, Hungarian footballer and manager (died 2005)
- 1914 – Fumio Hayasaka, Japanese composer (died 1955)
- 1914 – Rose Heilbron, British barrister and judge (died 2005)
- 1915 – Ring Lardner, Jr., American journalist and screenwriter (died 2000)
- 1915 – Peter Kemp, British soldier, mercenary, and writer (died 1993)
- 1916 – Dennis Poore, English racing driver and businessman (died 1987)
- 1919 – Malcolm Forbes, American publisher and politician (died 1990)
- 1921 – Gene Roddenberry, American screenwriter and producer (died 1991)
- 1922 – Jack Holland, Australian rugby league player (died 1994)
- 1923 – Edgar F. Codd, English computer scientist, inventor of relational model of data (died 2003)
- 1924 – Willard Boyle, Canadian physicist and academic, Nobel Prize laureate (died 2011)
- 1924 – William Marshall, American actor, director, and opera singer (died 2003)
- 1925 – Claude Gauvreau, Canadian poet and playwright (died 1971)
- 1926 – Angus Scrimm, American actor and author (died 2016)
- 1928 – Shiv Prasaad Singh, Indian Hindi writer (died 1998)
- 1929 – Ion N. Petrovici, Romanian-German neurologist and academic (died 2021)
- 1930 – Frank McCourt, American author and educator (died 2009)
- 1931 – Bill Shoemaker, American jockey and author (died 2003)
- 1932 – Thomas P. Salmon, American lawyer and politician, 75th Governor of Vermont
- 1932 – Banharn Silpa-archa, Thai politician, Prime Minister (1995–1996) (died 2016)
- 1933 – Bettina Cirone, American model and photographer (died 2026)
- 1933 – David Hopwood, English microbiologist and geneticist
- 1933 – Debra Paget, American actress
- 1935 – Bobby Richardson, American baseball player and coach
- 1937 – Richard Ingrams, English journalist, founded The Oldie
- 1938 – Diana Muldaur, American actress
- 1938 – Nelly Vuksic, Argentine conductor and musician
- 1939 – Alan Baker, British mathematician known for his work on transcendental number theory (died 2018)
- 1939 – Ginger Baker, English drummer and songwriter (died 2019)
- 1940 – Roger Cook, English songwriter, singer, and producer
- 1940 – Johnny Nash, American singer-songwriter (died 2020)
- 1940 – Jill St. John, American model and actress
- 1941 – John Cootes, Australian rugby league player, priest, and businessman
- 1941 – Mihalis Papagiannakis, Greek educator and politician (died 2009)
- 1942 – Fred Thompson, American actor, lawyer, and politician (died 2015)
- 1943 – Sid Going, New Zealand rugby player (died 2024)
- 1943 – Billy J. Kramer, English pop singer
- 1944 – Jack Canfield, American author
- 1944 – Stew Johnson, American basketball player
- 1944 – Bodil Malmsten, Swedish author and poet (died 2016)
- 1944 – Eddy Raven, American country music singer-songwriter
- 1944 – Charles Wang, Chinese-American businessman and philanthropist, co-founded Computer Associates International (died 2018)
- 1945 – Dennis Eichhorn, American author and illustrator (died 2015)
- 1945 – Charles Wellesley, 9th Duke of Wellington, English politician
- 1945 – Ian Gillan, English singer-songwriter
- 1946 – Charles Bolden, American general and astronaut
- 1946 – Bill Clinton, American lawyer and politician, 40th and 42nd Governor of Arkansas, 42nd President of the United States
- 1946 – Dawn Steel, American film producer (died 1997)
- 1947 – Gerald McRaney, American actor
- 1947 – Anuška Ferligoj, Slovenian mathematician
- 1948 – Jim Carter, English actor
- 1948 – Tipper Gore, American activist and author, former Second Lady of the United States
- 1948 – Christy O'Connor Jnr, Irish golfer and architect (died 2016)
- 1949 – Michael Nazir-Ali, Pakistani-English bishop
- 1950 – Jennie Bond, English journalist and author
- 1950 – Sudha Murty, Indian author and teacher, head of Infosys Foundation
- 1951 – John Deacon, English bass player and songwriter
- 1951 – Gustavo Santaolalla, Argentinian singer-songwriter, guitarist, and producer
- 1952 – Jonathan Frakes, American actor and director
- 1952 – Gabriela Grillo, German equestrian (died 2024)
- 1952 – Jimmy Watson, Canadian ice hockey player
- 1953 – Luis Muñoz, Costa Rican jazz percussionist and bandleader
- 1954 – Oscar Larrauri, Argentinian racing driver
- 1955 – Mary-Anne Fahey, Australian actress
- 1955 – Peter Gallagher, American actor
- 1955 – Patricia Scotland, Baroness Scotland of Asthal, Dominica-born English lawyer and politician, Attorney General for England and Wales
- 1956 – Adam Arkin, American actor, director, and producer
- 1956 – José Rubén Zamora, Guatemalan journalist
- 1957 – Paul-Jan Bakker, Dutch cricketer
- 1957 – Gary Chapman, American singer-songwriter and guitarist
- 1957 – Martin Donovan, American actor and director
- 1957 – Cesare Prandelli, Italian footballer and manager
- 1957 – Christine Soetewey, Belgian high jumper
- 1957 – Gerda Verburg, Dutch trade union leader and politician, Dutch Minister of Agriculture
- 1958 – Anthony Muñoz, American football player and sportscaster
- 1958 – Brendan Nelson, Australian physician and politician, 47th Minister for Defence for Australia
- 1958 – Rick Snyder, American politician and businessman, 48th Governor of Michigan
- 1958 – Darryl Sutter, Canadian ice hockey player and coach
- 1959 – Chris Mortimer, Australian rugby league player
- 1959 – Ivan Neville, American singer-songwriter
- 1960 – Morten Andersen, Danish-American football player
- 1960 – Ron Darling, American baseball player and commentator
- 1961 – Jonathan Coe, English author and academic
- 1963 – John Stamos, American actor
- 1965 – Kevin Dillon, American actor
- 1965 – Kyra Sedgwick, American actress and producer
- 1965 – James Tomkins, Australian rower
- 1966 – Lee Ann Womack, American singer-songwriter
- 1967 – Satya Nadella, Indian-American business executive, chairman and CEO of Microsoft
- 1969 – Douglas Allen Tunstall Jr., American professional wrestler and politician
- 1969 – Nate Dogg, American rapper (died 2011)
- 1969 – Matthew Perry, American actor, producer, and screenwriter (died 2023)
- 1969 – Kazuyoshi Tatsunami, Japanese baseball player and coach
- 1969 – Clay Walker, American singer-songwriter and guitarist
- 1970 – Fat Joe, American rapper
- 1971 – Mary Joe Fernández, Dominican-American tennis player and coach
- 1971 – João Vieira Pinto, Portuguese footballer
- 1972 – Roberto Abbondanzieri, Argentinian footballer and manager
- 1972 – Chihiro Yonekura, Japanese singer-songwriter
- 1973 – Marco Materazzi, Italian footballer and manager
- 1973 – Roy Rogers, American basketball player and coach
- 1973 – Tasma Walton, Australian actress
- 1975 – Tracie Thoms, American actress
- 1976 – Régine Chassagne, Canadian singer-songwriter
- 1977 – Iban Mayo, Spanish cyclist
- 1978 – Jakub Dvorský, Czech game designer
- 1978 – Thomas Jones, American football player
- 1979 – Oumar Kondé, Swiss footballer
- 1980 – Darius Campbell, Scottish singer-songwriter, guitarist, and actor (died 2022)
- 1980 – Craig Frawley, Australian rugby league player
- 1980 – Jun Jin, South Korean singer
- 1980 – Paul Parry, Welsh footballer
- 1981 – Nick Kennedy, English rugby player
- 1981 – Taylor Pyatt, Canadian ice hockey player
- 1982 – Erika Christensen, American actress
- 1982 – Melissa Fumero, American actress
- 1982 – Kevin Rans, Belgian pole vaulter
- 1982 – Stipe Miocic, American professional mixed martial artist
- 1982 – Steve Ott, Canadian ice hockey player
- 1983 – Missy Higgins, Australian singer-songwriter
- 1983 – Tammin Sursok, South African-Australian actress and singer
- 1984 – Simon Bird, English actor and screenwriter
- 1984 – Alessandro Matri, Italian footballer
- 1984 – Ryan Taylor, English footballer
- 1985 – Lindsey Jacobellis, American snowboarder
- 1986 – Sotiris Balafas, Greek footballer
- 1986 – Saori Kimura, Japanese volleyball player
- 1986 – Christina Perri, American singer and songwriter
- 1987 – Patrick Chung, Jamaican-American football player
- 1987 – Manny Jacinto, Canadian actor
- 1987 – Nick Driebergen, Dutch swimmer
- 1987 – Nico Hülkenberg, German racing driver
- 1988 – Kirk Cousins, American football player
- 1988 – Veronica Roth, American author
- 1989 – Romeo Miller, American basketball player, rapper, actor
- 1991 – Salem Al-Dawsari, Saudi Arabian footballer
- 1992 – David Rittich, Czech ice hockey player
- 1993 – Pio Seci, Fijian rugby league player
- 1994 – Nafissatou Thiam, Belgian pentathlete and heptathlete
- 1994 – Fernando Gaviria, Colombian cyclist
- 1996 – Jung Ye-rin, South Korean singer and actress
- 1996 – Lachlan Lewis, Australian rugby league player
- 1999 – Ethan Cutkosky, American actor and musician
- 1999 – Thomas Flegler, Australian rugby league player
- 1999 – Florentino Luís, Portuguese footballer
- 2000 – Keegan Murray, American basketball player
- 2001 – Awak Kuier, Finnish basketball player
- 2004 – Chae Hyun-woo, South Korean football player
- 2004 – Nguyễn Đình Bắc, Vietnamese football player

== Deaths ==
=== Pre-1600 ===
- 607 BC – Duke Ling of Jin, Chinese monarch
- AD 14 – Augustus, Roman emperor (born 63 BC)
- 780 – Credan, English abbot and saint
- 947 – Abu Yazid, Kharijite rebel leader (born 873)
- 998 – Fujiwara no Sukemasa, Japanese noble, statesman and calligrapher (born 944)
- 1072 – Hawise, Duchess of Brittany (born 1037)
- 1085 – Al-Juwayni, Muslim scholar and imam (born 1028)
- 1186 – Geoffrey II, Duke of Brittany (born 1158)
- 1245 – Ramon Berenguer IV, Count of Provence (born 1195)
- 1284 – Alphonso, Earl of Chester (born 1273)
- 1297 – Louis of Toulouse, French bishop and saint (born 1274)
- 1457 – Andrea del Castagno, Italian painter (born 1421)
- 1470 – Richard Olivier de Longueil, French cardinal (born 1406)
- 1493 – Frederick III, Holy Roman Emperor (born 1415)
- 1506 – King Alexander Jagiellon of Poland (born 1461)
- 1541 – Vincenzo Cappello, Venetian admiral and statesman (born 1469)
- 1580 – Andrea Palladio, Italian architect, designed the Church of San Giorgio Maggiore and Il Redentore (born 1508)

=== 1601–1900 ===
- 1646 – Alexander Henderson, Scottish theologian and academic (born 1583)
- 1654 – Yom-Tov Lipmann Heller, Bohemian rabbi (born 1579)
- 1662 – Blaise Pascal, French mathematician, physicist, and philosopher (born 1623)
- 1680 – Jean Eudes, French priest, founded the Congregation of Jesus and Mary (born 1601)
- 1691 – Köprülü Fazıl Mustafa Pasha, Ottoman commander and politician, 117th Grand Vizier of the Ottoman Empire (born 1637)
- 1702 – Anthony Grey, 11th Earl of Kent, English politician (born 1645)
- 1753 – Johann Balthasar Neumann, German engineer and architect, designed Basilica of the Fourteen Holy Helpers (born 1687)
- 1808 – Fredrik Henrik af Chapman, Swedish admiral and shipbuilder (born 1721)
- 1822 – Jean Baptiste Joseph Delambre, French mathematician and astronomer (born 1749)
- 1883 – Jeremiah S. Black, American lawyer and politician, 24th United States Attorney General (born 1810)
- 1889 – Auguste Villiers de l'Isle-Adam, French author, poet, and playwright (born 1838)
- 1895 – John Wesley Hardin, American Old West outlaw, gunfighter (born 1853)
- 1900 – Jean-Baptiste Accolay, Belgian violinist, composer, and conductor (born 1833)

=== 1901–present ===
- 1914 – Franz Xavier Wernz, German religious leader, 25th Superior General of the Society of Jesus (born 1844)
- 1915 – Tevfik Fikret, Turkish poet and educator (born 1867)
- 1923 – Vilfredo Pareto, Italian sociologist and economist (born 1845)
- 1928 – Stefanos Skouloudis, Greek banker and diplomat, 97th Prime Minister of Greece (born 1838)
- 1929 – Sergei Diaghilev, Russian critic and producer, founded Ballets Russes (born 1872)
- 1932 – Louis Anquetin, French painter (born 1861)
- 1936 – Federico García Lorca, Spanish poet, playwright, and director (born 1898)
- 1942 – Harald Kaarmann, Estonian footballer (born 1901)
- 1942 – Heinrich Rauchinger, Kraków-born painter (born 1858)
- 1944 – Henry Wood, English conductor (born 1869)
- 1945 – Tomás Burgos, Chilean philanthropist (born 1875)
- 1950 – Giovanni Giorgi, Italian physicist and engineer (born 1871)
- 1954 – Alcide De Gasperi, Italian journalist and politician, 30th Prime Minister of Italy (born 1881)
- 1957 – David Bomberg, English soldier and painter (born 1890)
- 1967 – Hugo Gernsback, Luxembourg-born American author and publisher (born 1884)
- 1967 – Isaac Deutscher, Polish-English journalist and historian (born 1907)
- 1968 – George Gamow, Ukrainian-American physicist and cosmologist (born 1904)
- 1970 – Paweł Jasienica, Polish soldier and historian (born 1909)
- 1975 – Mark Donohue, American race car driver and engineer (born 1937)
- 1976 – Alastair Sim, Scottish-English actor (born 1900)
- 1976 – Ken Wadsworth, New Zealand cricketer (born 1946)
- 1977 – Aleksander Kreek, Estonian shot putter and discus thrower (born 1914)
- 1977 – Groucho Marx, American comedian and actor (born 1890)
- 1980 – Otto Frank, German-Swiss businessman, father of Anne Frank (born 1889)
- 1981 – Jessie Matthews, English actress, singer, and dancer (born 1907)
- 1982 – August Neo, Estonian wrestler (born 1908)
- 1986 – Hermione Baddeley, English actress (born 1906)
- 1986 – Viv Thicknesse, Australian rugby player (born 1910)
- 1993 – Utpal Dutt, Bangladeshi actor, director, and playwright (born 1929)
- 1994 – Linus Pauling, American chemist and biologist, Nobel Prize laureate (born 1901)
- 1995 – Pierre Schaeffer, French composer and musicologist (born 1910)
- 2000 – Bineshwar Brahma, Indian poet, author, and educator (born 1948)
- 2001 – Donald Woods, South African journalist and activist (born 1933)
- 2003 – Carlos Roberto Reina, Honduran lawyer and politician, President of Honduras (born 1926)
- 2003 – Sérgio Vieira de Mello, Brazilian diplomat (born 1948)
- 2005 – Mo Mowlam, English academic and politician, Chancellor of the Duchy of Lancaster (born 1949)
- 2008 – Levy Mwanawasa, Zambian lawyer and politician, 3rd President of Zambia (born 1948)
- 2009 – Don Hewitt, American television producer, created 60 Minutes (born 1922)
- 2011 – Raúl Ruiz, Chilean director and producer (born 1941)
- 2012 – Donal Henahan, American journalist and critic (born 1921)
- 2012 – Ivar Iversen, Norwegian canoe racer (born 1914)
- 2012 – Tony Scott, English-American director and producer (born 1944)
- 2013 – Musa'id bin Abdulaziz Al Saud, Saudi Arabian prince (born 1923)
- 2013 – Abdul Rahim Hatif, Afghan politician, 8th President of Afghanistan (born 1926)
- 2013 – Donna Hightower, American singer-songwriter (born 1926)
- 2014 – Samih al-Qasim, Palestinian poet and journalist (born 1939)
- 2014 – Simin Behbahani, Iranian poet and activist (born 1927)
- 2014 – Candida Lycett Green, Anglo-Irish journalist and author (born 1942)
- 2015 – Sanat Mehta, Indian activist and politician (born 1935)
- 2017 – Brian Aldiss, British novelist (born 1925)
- 2017 – Dick Gregory, American comedian, author and activist (born 1932)
- 2019 – Lars Larsen, Danish businessman and billionaire, founder and owner of the Danish retail chain JYSK (born 1948)
- 2021 – Sonny Chiba, Japanese actor (born 1939)
- 2022 – Tekla Juniewicz, Polish supercentenarian (born 1906)
- 2023 – Václav Patejdl, Slovak musician (born 1954)
- 2024 – Maria Branyas, American-Spanish supercentenarian (born 1907)

== Holidays and observances ==
- Afghan Independence Day, commemorates the Treaty of Rawalpindi in 1919, granting independence from Britain (Afghanistan)
- August Revolution Commemoration Day (Vietnam)
- Birthday of Crown Princess Mette-Marit (Norway)
- Christian Feast Day:
  - Bertulf of Bobbio
  - Saint Calminius
  - Ezequiél Moreno y Díaz
  - Feast of the Transfiguration (Julian calendar), and its related observances:
    - Buhe (Ethiopian Orthodox Tewahedo Church and Eritrean Orthodox Tewahedo Church)
    - Saviour's Transfiguration, popularly known as the "Apples Feast" (Russian Orthodox Church and Georgian Orthodox Church)
  - Jean-Eudes de Mézeray
  - Louis of Toulouse
  - Maginus
  - Magnus of Anagni
  - Magnus of Avignon
  - Sebaldus
  - August 19 (Eastern Orthodox liturgics)
- Manuel Luis Quezón Day (Quezon City and other places in the Philippines named after Manuel L. Quezon)
- National Aviation Day (United States)
- World Humanitarian Day
