= August 19 (Eastern Orthodox liturgics) =

Day in the Eastern Orthodox liturgical calendar

Eastern Orthodox liturgical calendar
August 18	August 19	August 20
August 19 O.S. ≍ September 1 N.S. August 19 N.S ≍ August 6 O.S.

An Eastern Orthodox cross

August 19 in Eastern Orthodox liturgical calendars is a feast day and a day of commemoration of saints and martyrs. Although some Orthodox churches use the Revised Julian Calendar and others use the traditional Julian calendar, the fixed commemorations for their respective August 19 are broadly the same, no matter which calendar is used. (Note: Despite the dates being the same, the days to which they refer typically differ by 13 days. The notation Old Style or O.S. is sometimes used to indicate a date in the traditional Julian Calendar (the "Old Calendar"). The notation New Style or N.S. indicates a date in the Revised Julian calendar (the "New Calendar").)

== Feasts ==
- Afterfeast of the Dormition. (Note: On the fourth day of the Afterfeast of the Dormition, the Church continues to honor the passage of the Most Holy Theotokos from death to life. Just as Christ once dwelt in the virginal womb of His Mother, now He takes Her "to dwell in His courts.")

== Saints ==
- Martyr Andrew Stratelates and 2,593 soldier-martyrs with him, in Cilicia (284-305) (Note: "In Cilicia, the birthday of St. Andrew, tribune, and his military companions, who were converted to Christianity through a miraculous victory they had gained over the Persians. Being accused on this account, they were massacred in the defiles of Mount Taurus by the army of the governor Seleueus, under the emperor Maximian.")
- Saint Sarah the Righteous (17th century BC)
- Saint Moses and Sarah of Alexandria (3rd century)
- Martyrs Timothy, Agapius, and Thecla, of Palestine (304) (Note: "In Palestine, St. Timothy, a martyr, in the persecution of Diocletian, under the governor Urbanus. After overcoming many torments, he was consumed with a slow fire. In the same country suffered also Thecla and Agapius. The former being exposed to the beasts, was torn to pieces by their teeth, and went to her spouse; but Agapius, after enduring many torments, was reserved for greater combats.")
- Martyrs Eutychianus, Strategius and Myron, by fire (304)

== Pre-Schism Western saints ==
- Saint Julius, an early martyr in Rome (c. 190) (Note: "AT Rome, St. Julius, senator and martyr, who was delivered up to the judge Vitellius, and by him thrown into prison. By order of the emperor Commodus, he was beaten with rods until he expired. His body was buried in the cemetery of Calepodius on the Aurelian road.")
- Saint Rufinus, a saint venerated in Mantua in Italy from early times, confessor.
- Saint Magnus of Anagni, martyr (2nd century)
- Saint Saint Maginus of Tarragona, hermit (3rd century)
- Saint Sixtus III, bishop of Rome (440)
- Saint Marianus, a hermit in the forest of Entreaigues in Berry in France, confessor (c. 515) (Note: His life was written by St Gregory of Tours.)
- Saint Donatus, presbyter, born in Orleans in France, he lived as a hermit on Mt Jura near Sisteron in Provence (c. 535) (Note: "In the neighborhood of Sisteron, in France, blessed Donatus, priest and confessor. Being from his very infancy endowed with the grace of God in an extraordinary manner, he lived the life of an anchoret for many years, and after having been renowned for glorious miracles, went to Christ.")
- Saint Elaphius, Bishop of Châlons-sur-Marne in France (580) (Note: He was sent as an envoy to Spain and wished to venerate the relics of St Eulalia at Merida but reposed before he reached his destination.)
- Saint Mochta (Mochteus), possibly born in Wales, he founded the monastery of Louth in Ireland (6th century)
- Saint Bertulf of Bobbio, a monk at Luxeuil in France, then went to Bobbio in Italy where he became abbot on the repose of St Attalas (640)
- Saint Magnus of Avignon (660) (Note: Born in Avignon in France, he was appointed governor of the town. After his wife's death he joined the monks of Lérins, where his son St Agricola had preceded him and where he became bishop.)
- Saint Calminius (Calmilius), a hermit who founded the monasteries of Villars and Mauzac near Riom in France (c. 690)
- Saint Guenninus, Bishop of Vannes in Brittany (7th century) (Note: His relics are enshrined in the Cathedral there.)
- Saint Namadie (Namadia), wife of St Calminius, as a widow she became a nun at Marsat in France (c. 700)
- Saint Sebaldus, probably born in England, he lived as a hermit near Vicenza in Italy, then preached with St Willibald in the Reichswald in Germany (c. 770)
- Saint Credan, eighth Abbot of Evesham Abbey (780) (Note: "ST. CREDAN was the eighth Abbot of Evesham in succession to St. Egwin. He governed this great monastery in the time of Offa of Mercia, and his name appears in several charters of that powerful King. There is little record of his Acts during his life, but after death he was venerated as a Saint, and an endowment was made to burn a candle before his sepulchre day and night on his annual festival. About the year 1055, the Abbot Manny erected a shrine in his honour; and when, in consequence of some doubt which had arisen, the authenticity of his relics was tested by fire in the year 1077, the flame refused to touch them. This miracle led to their solemn translation, and during the ceremony, they appeared to the beholders to shine like gold. It was also noticed as a prodigy, that when the tower of the church fell A.D. 1207, and ruined almost everything contained within its walls, the shrine of St. Credan, as well as those of St. Egwin and St. Odulph, remained uninjured.")
- Saint Marinus, Bishop at the monastery of St Peter in Besalú in Catalonia in Spain (c. 800)
- Saint Badulf (Badour, Badolf), a monk and Abbot of Ainay, near Lyon in France (850)
- Saint Leovigild and Christopher, monks, martyred in Córdoba under Abderrahman II (852) (Note: Leovigild was a monk and pastor in Córdoba in Spain and Christopher a monk of the monastery of St Martin de La Rojana near Córdoba. They were martyred in Córdoba under Abd ar-Rahman II. Note, the Roman Martyrology lists them under August 20.)

== Post-Schism Orthodox saints ==
- Saint Pitirim, Bishop of Perm (1455)
- Venerable Theophanes of Docheiariou monastery, the New Wonderworker (16th century) (Note: The Translation of his relics took place in 1923. His major shrine is in Naousa, Imathia, Macedonia, Greece.)

=== New martyrs and confessors ===
- Saint Nicholas Lebedev, Priest of Tver, New-Martyr (1933)
- Saint Mary (Korepova), nun and confessor (1942)

== Other commemorations ==
- "Donskoy" Icon of the Most Holy Theotokos (Theotokos "Of the Don"), commemoration of salvation of Moscow from the Tatar siege (1591) (Note: See: (in Russian) Донская икона Божией Матери. Википедии. (Russian Wikipedia).)
- Uncovering of the relics (1646) of St. Gennadius, Abbot of Kostroma (1565)
- Repose of Abbess Maria (Ushakova) of Diveyevo (1904)
- Repose of Archimandrite Spyridon (Efimov) (1984), disciple of St. John of Shanghai and San Francisco.

== Icon gallery ==
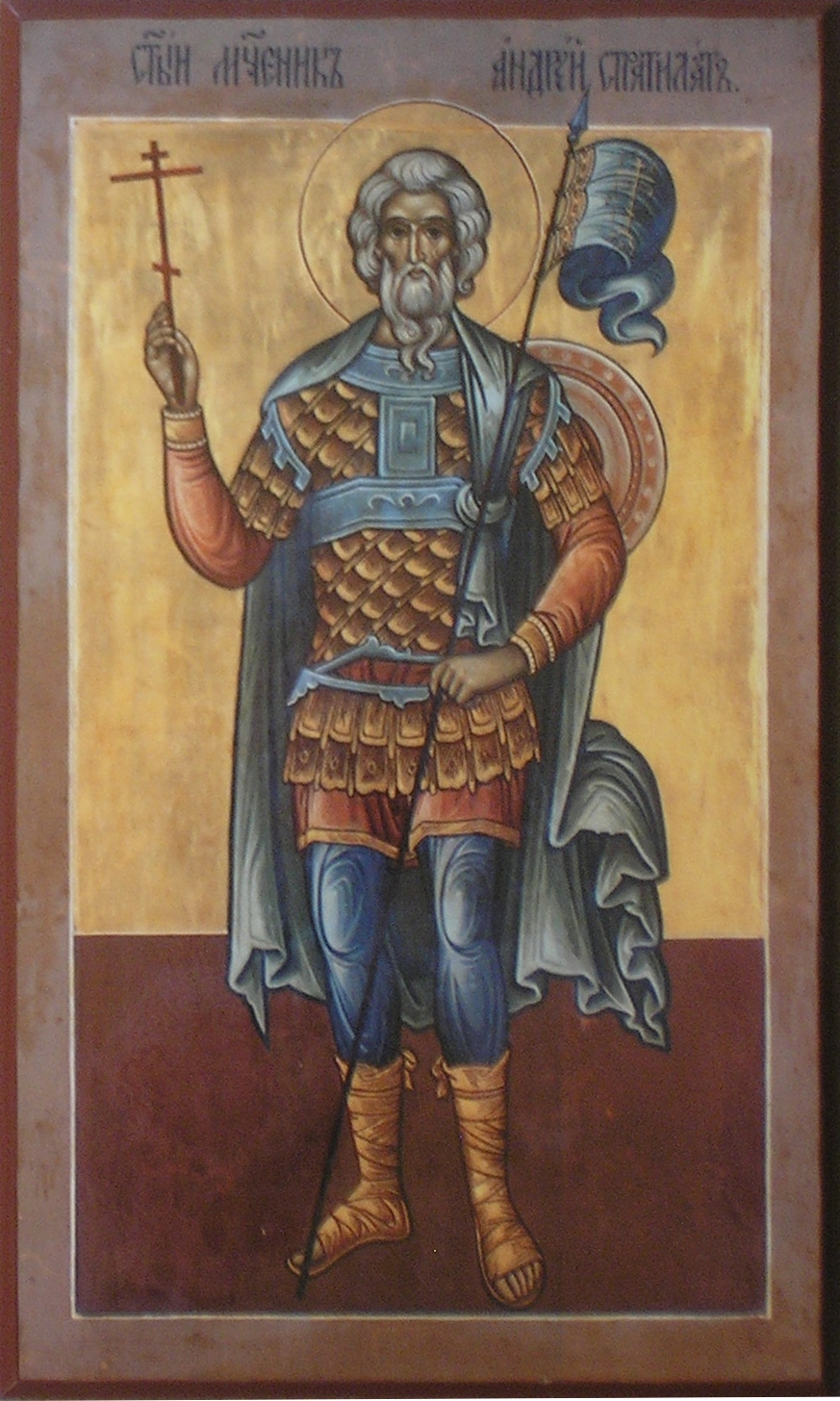
Andrew Stratelates.

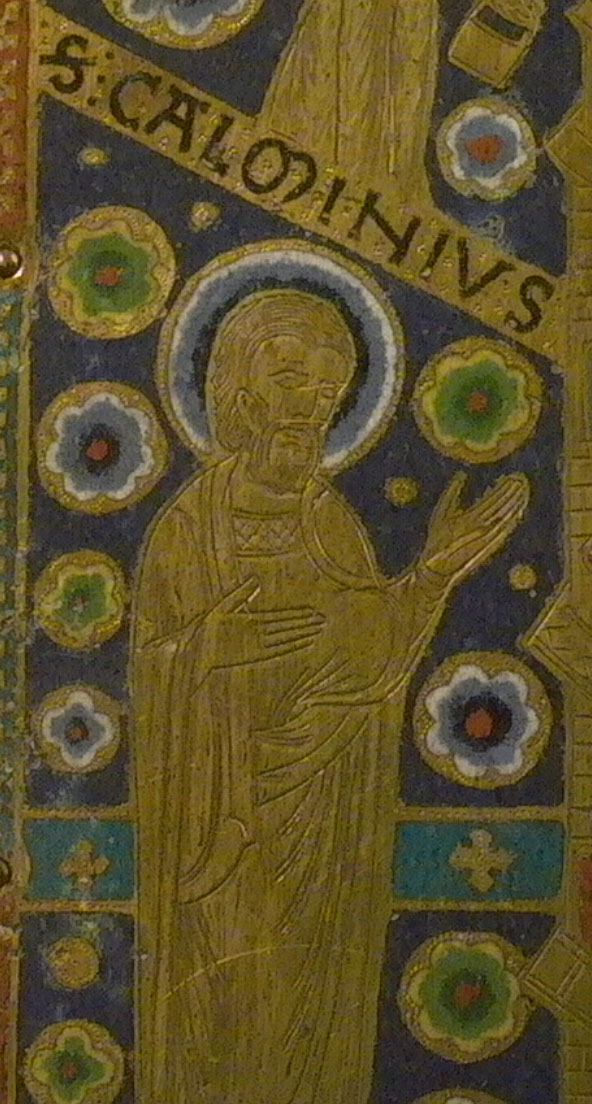
Saint Calminius

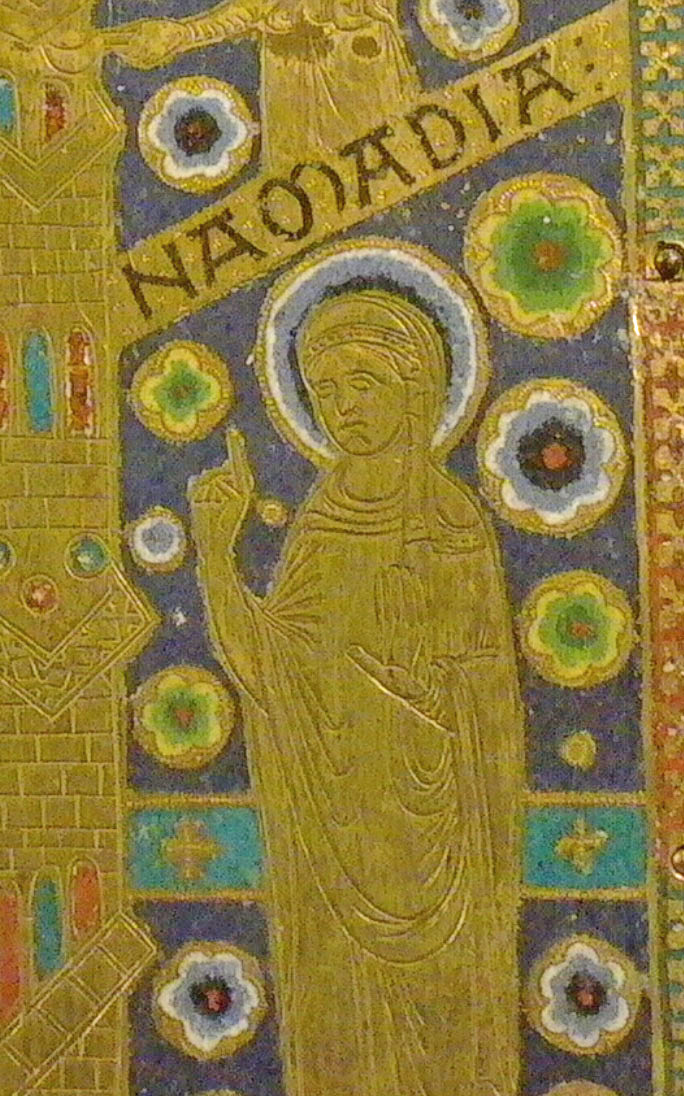
Saint Namadie

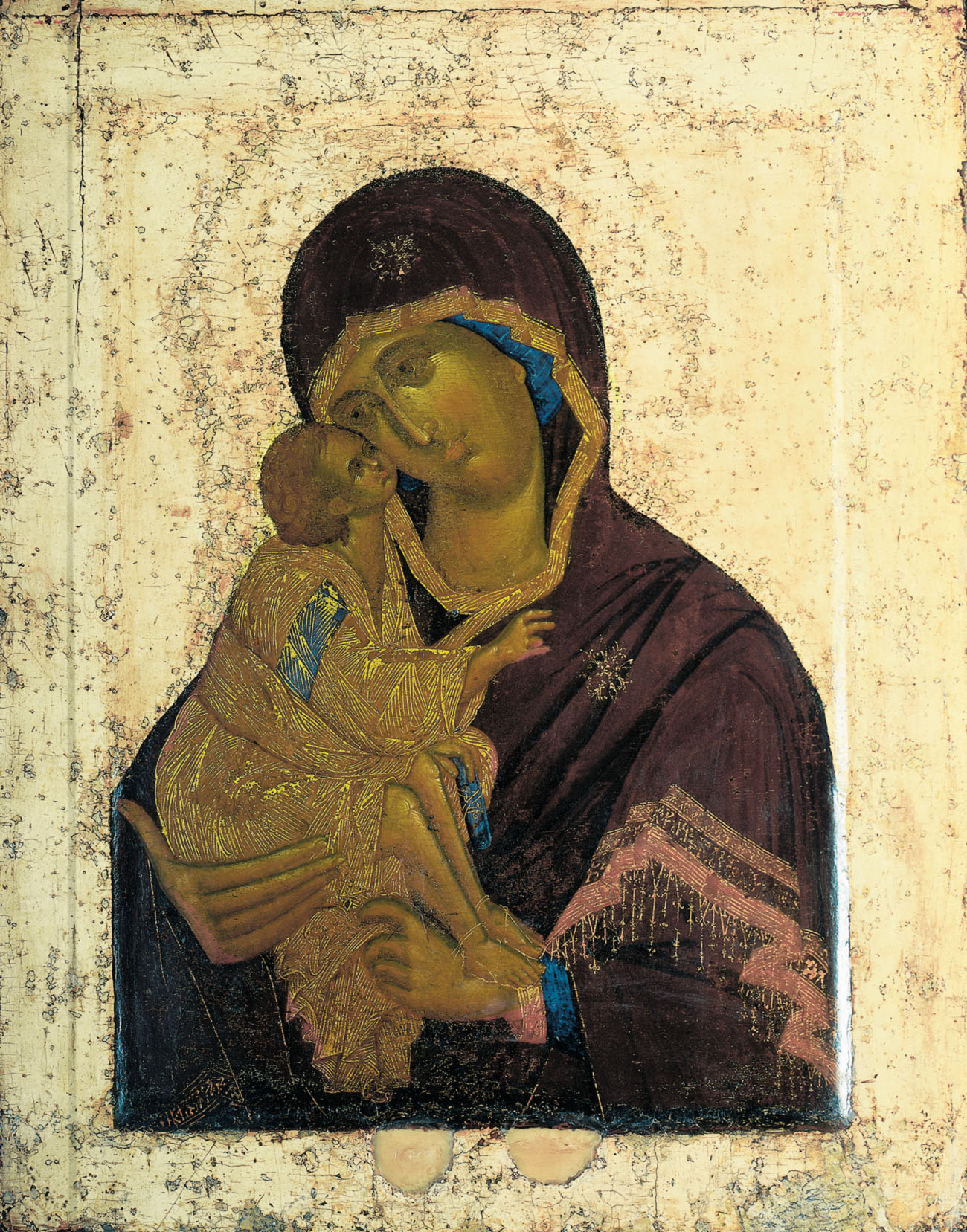
"Donskoy" Icon of the Most Holy Theotokos.

== Sources ==
- August 19 / September 1. Orthodox Calendar (PRAVOSLAVIE.RU).
- September 1 / August 19. Holy Trinity Russian Orthodox Church (A parish of the Patriarchate of Moscow).
- August 19. OCA - The Lives of the Saints.
- The Autonomous Orthodox Metropolia of Western Europe and the Americas (ROCOR). St. Hilarion Calendar of Saints for the year of our Lord 2004. St. Hilarion Press (Austin, TX). p. 61.
- Menologion: The Nineteenth Day Day of the Month of August. Orthodoxy in China.
- The Passion of Saint Andrew the Commander. pp. 1–16. Retrieved: 1 October 2014.
- August 19. Latin Saints of the Orthodox Patriarchate of Rome.
- The Roman Martyrology. Transl. by the Archbishop of Baltimore. Last Edition, According to the Copy Printed at Rome in 1914. Revised Edition, with the Imprimatur of His Eminence Cardinal Gibbons. Baltimore: John Murphy Company, 1916. pp. 248–250.
- Rev. Richard Stanton. A Menology of England and Wales, or, Brief Memorials of the Ancient British and English Saints Arranged According to the Calendar, Together with the Martyrs of the 16th and 17th Centuries. London: Burns & Oates, 1892. pp. 399–401.

Greek Sources

- Great Synaxaristes: (in Greek) 19 ΑΥΓΟΥΣΤΟΥ. ΜΕΓΑΣ ΣΥΝΑΞΑΡΙΣΤΗΣ.
- (in Greek) Συναξαριστής. 19 Αυγούστου. ECCLESIA.GR. (H ΕΚΚΛΗΣΙΑ ΤΗΣ ΕΛΛΑΔΟΣ).

Russian Sources

- (in Russian) 1 сентября (19 августа). Православная Энциклопедия под редакцией Патриарха Московского и всея Руси Кирилла (электронная версия). (Orthodox Encyclopedia - Pravenc.ru).
