= Saint Namadia =

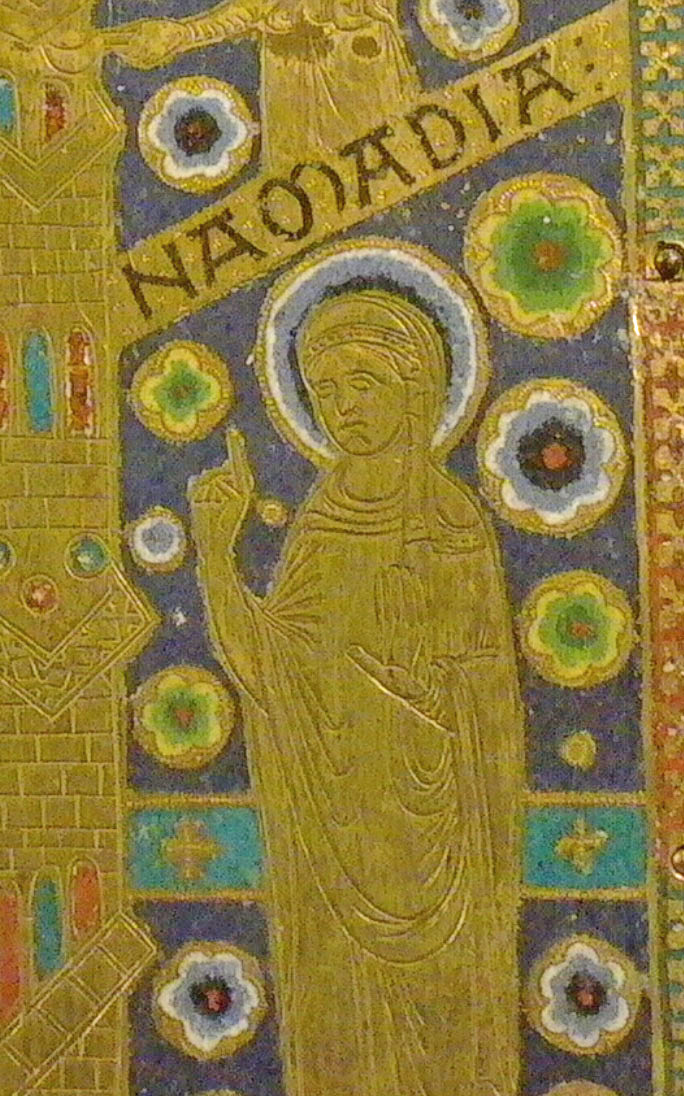
Saint Namadia on the Saint Calminius Reliquary (12th century) held in the church of Mozac Abbey

Namadia (French: Namadie) was the wife of Calminius, with whom she is venerated as a Christian saint. On her husband's death in the 6th or 7th century she retired until her death to the monastic community at Marsat, which later became a dependent house of Mozac Abbey 2 kilometres away. Her feast day is 13 January.

== Biography ==
She is shown on the Limoges enamel reliquary holding the remains of her and her husband, the Saint Calminius Reliquary, which dates to the end of the 12th century and is held in the church of the former Mozac Abbey. She is not shown on the other reliquary of Calminius, which originated in the church at Laguenne (one of his foundations) and is now held in the Musée Dobrée at Nantes.
