= Louis-Antoine Chartoire =

French pilot

- Born: 1 June 1895; Marsat, France
- Died: 11 August 1992 (aged 97); Chamalieres, France
- Military career
- Allegiance: France
- Branch: Flying service
- Rank: Lieutenant
- Unit: Escadrille 31
- Conflicts: World War I
- Awards: Legion d'Honneur, Croix de Guerre

Louis-Antoine Chartoire (1 June 1895 – 11 August 1992) was a French World War I flying ace credited with five victories.

== Biography ==
Louis-Antoine Chartoire was born in Marsat, France on 1 June 1895. He began military service as an infantryman in December 1914. After serving in several infantry regiments, he was assigned to aviation training on 1 April 1917. On 26 June 1917, he received Military Pilot's Brevet No. 7199. After advanced instruction, he was posted to Escadrille 31 on 29 September 1917. Beginning 17 October, he scored five victories by war's end. His Legion d'honneur citation notes both this feat, and his prior infantry service. Chartoire was also awarded the Croix de Guerre.
