= Châteaugay =

Châteaugay Chasteugai (Occitan)
- Commune
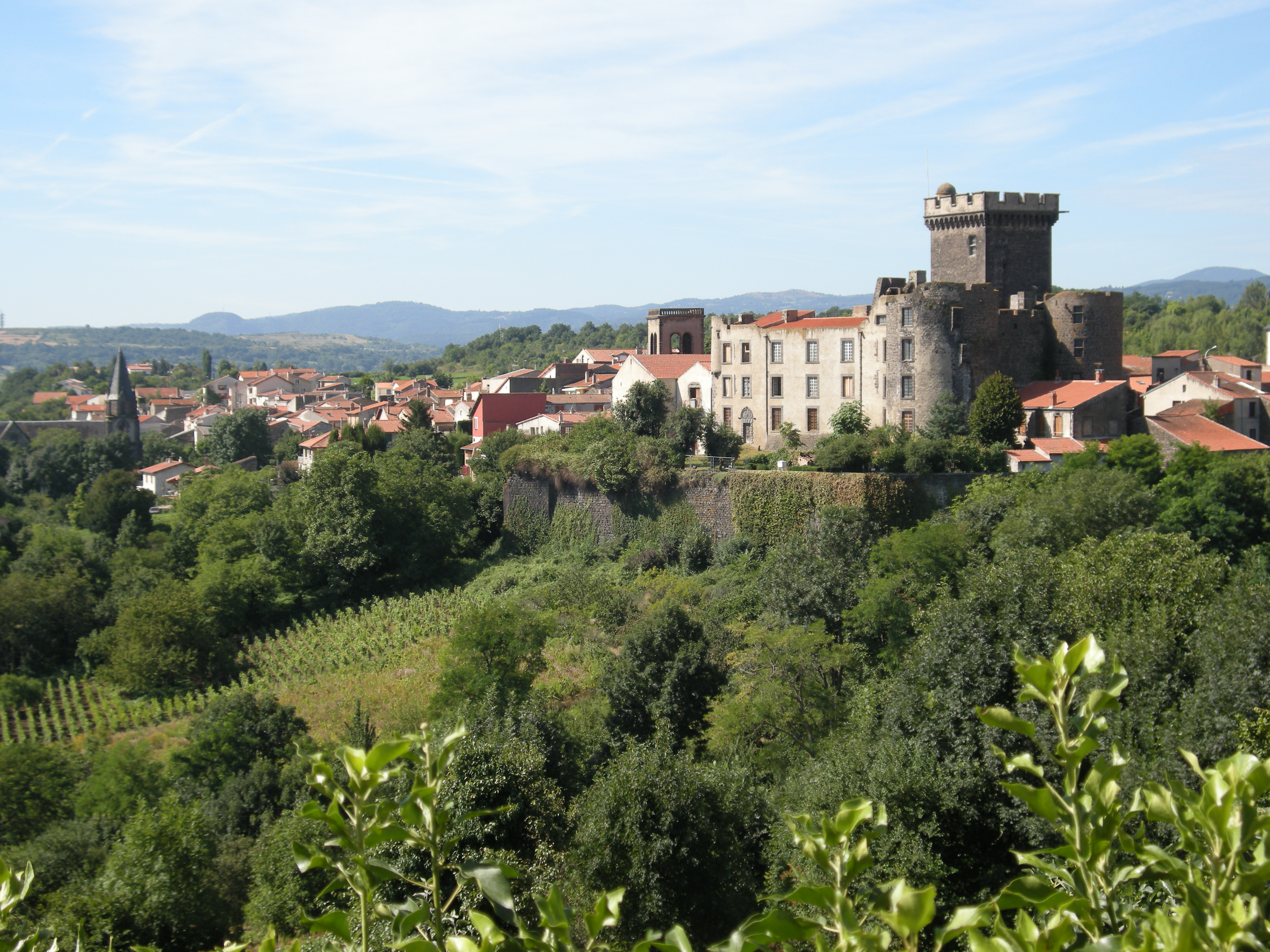
- View of Châteaugay

- Coat of arms
- Location of Châteaugay
- Location within France Location within Auvergne-Rhône-Alpes
- Coordinates: 45°51′07″N 3°05′08″E
- Country: France
- Region: Auvergne-Rhône-Alpes
- Department: Puy-de-Dôme
- Arrondissement: Clermont-Ferrand
- Canton: Châtel-Guyon
- Intercommunality: Clermont Auvergne Métropole

Government
  - Mayor (2020–2026): René Darteyre
- Area^{1}: 9.08 km^{2} (3.51 sq mi)
- Elevation: 536 m (1,759 ft)
- Highest elevation: 537 m (1,762 ft)
- Lowest elevation: 320 m (1,050 ft)
- Population (2023): 3,189
  - Density: 351/km^{2} (910/sq mi)
- Time zone: UTC+01:00 (CET)
  - Summer (DST): UTC+02:00 (CEST)
- INSEE/Postal code: 63099 /63119
- ^{1} French Land Register data, which excludes lakes, ponds, glaciers > 1 km^{2} (0.386 sq mi or 247 acres) and river estuaries.

Châteaugay (French: [ʃɑtoɡɛ]; Auvergnat: Chasteugai) is a commune in the Puy-de-Dôme department in Auvergne-Rhône-Alpes in central France.

== Population ==
Historical population
Year	Pop.	±% p.a.
1968	1,847	—
1975	2,144	+2.15%
1982	2,410	+1.68%
1990	3,050	+2.99%
1999	2,963	−0.32%
2007	3,090	+0.53%
2012	3,160	+0.45%
2017	3,135	−0.16%
2023	3,189	+0.29%
Source: INSEE

== See also ==
- Communes of the Puy-de-Dôme department
