= Canton of Châtel-Guyon =

Coordinates: 45.92°N 3.07°E

The canton of Châtel-Guyon is an administrative division of the Puy-de-Dôme department, central France. It was created at the French canton reorganisation which came into effect in March 2015. Its seat is in Châtel-Guyon.

It consists of the following communes:

1. Châteaugay
2. Châtel-Guyon
3. Enval
4. Malauzat
5. Marsat
6. Ménétrol
7. Mozac
8. Volvic
