= Malauzat =

- Commune
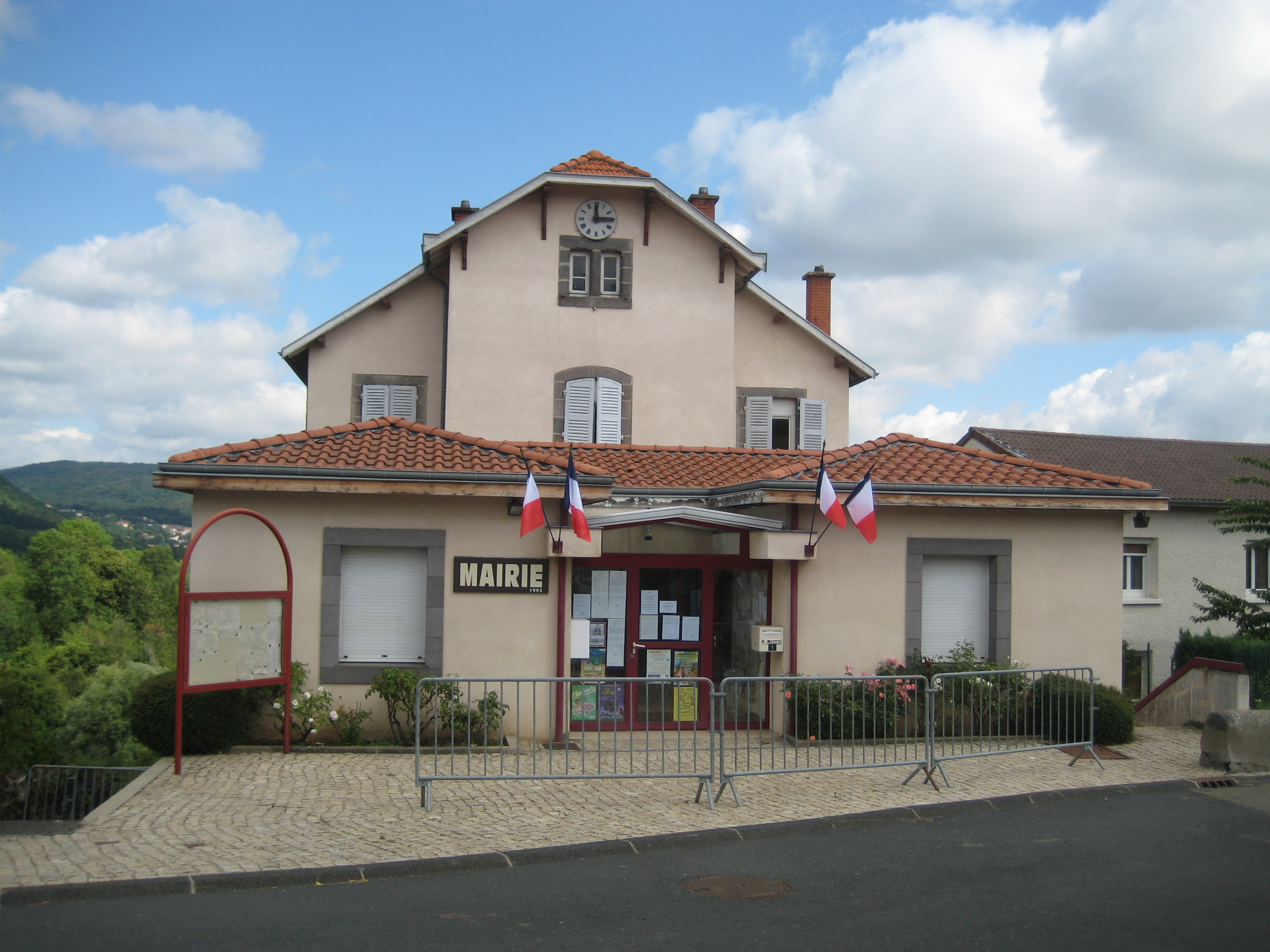
- The town hall in Malauzat
- Location of Malauzat
- Location within France Location within Auvergne-Rhône-Alpes
- Coordinates: 45°50′53″N 3°03′15″E
- Country: France
- Region: Auvergne-Rhône-Alpes
- Department: Puy-de-Dôme
- Arrondissement: Riom
- Canton: Châtel-Guyon
- Intercommunality: CA Riom Limagne et Volcans

Government
  - Mayor (2020–2026): Jean-Paul Ayral
- Area^{1}: 5.99 km^{2} (2.31 sq mi)
- Elevation: 500 m (1,600 ft)
- Highest elevation: 562 m (1,844 ft)
- Lowest elevation: 377 m (1,237 ft)
- Population (2023): 1,160
  - Density: 194/km^{2} (502/sq mi)
- Time zone: UTC+01:00 (CET)
  - Summer (DST): UTC+02:00 (CEST)
- INSEE/Postal code: 63203 /63200
- ^{1} French Land Register data, which excludes lakes, ponds, glaciers > 1 km^{2} (0.386 sq mi or 247 acres) and river estuaries.

Malauzat (French pronunciation: [maloza]) is a commune in the Puy-de-Dôme department in Auvergne in central France.

== See also ==
- Communes of the Puy-de-Dôme department
