= Ménétrol =

- Commune
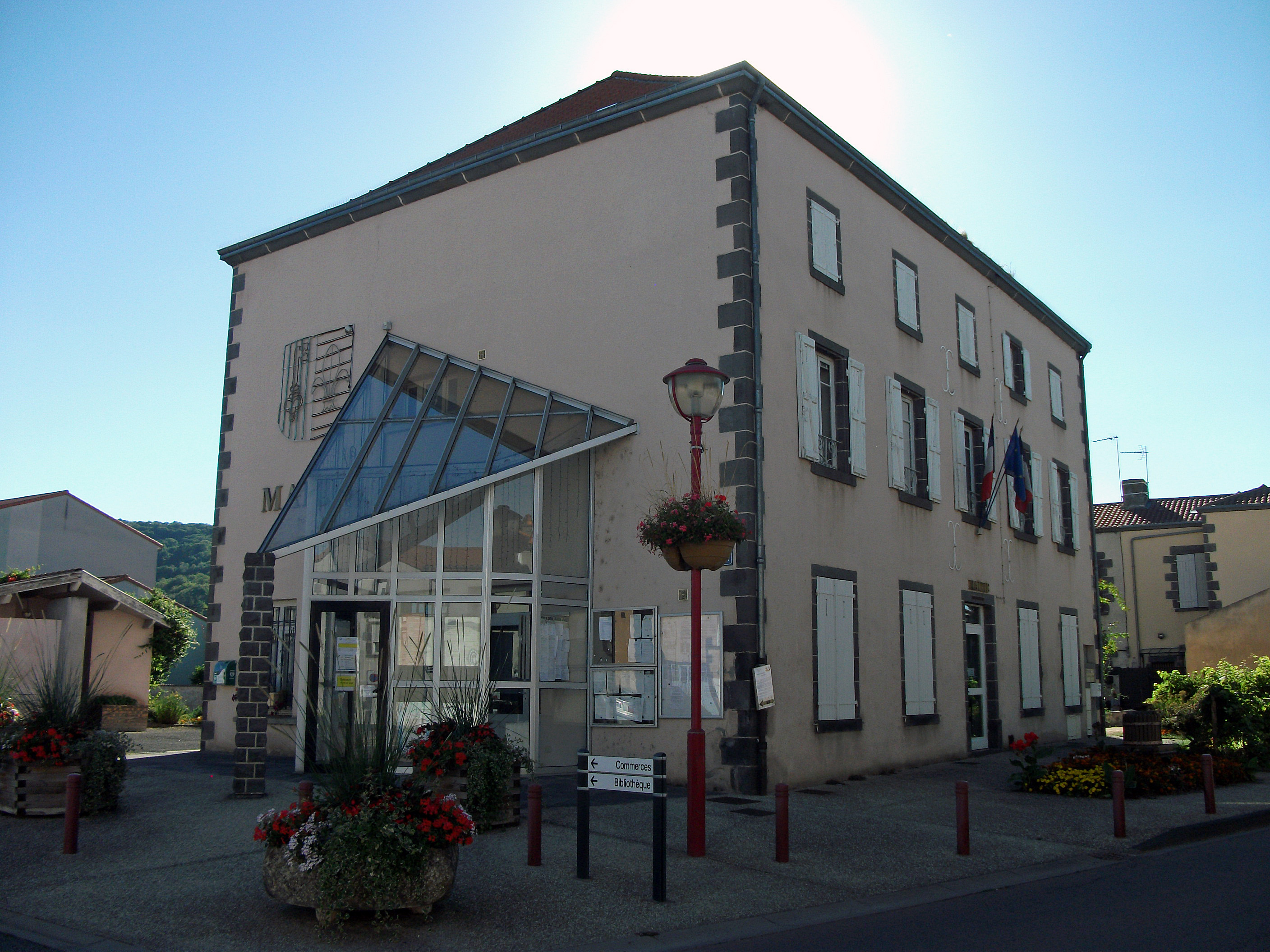
- The town hall in Ménétrol

- Coat of arms
- Location of Ménétrol
- Location within France Location within Auvergne-Rhône-Alpes
- Coordinates: 45°52′21″N 3°07′30″E
- Country: France
- Region: Auvergne-Rhône-Alpes
- Department: Puy-de-Dôme
- Arrondissement: Riom
- Canton: Châtel-Guyon
- Intercommunality: CA Riom Limagne et Volcans

Government
  - Mayor (2026–32): Jérôme De Abreu
- Area^{1}: 8.94 km^{2} (3.45 sq mi)
- Elevation: 330 m (1,080 ft)
- Highest elevation: 521 m (1,709 ft)
- Lowest elevation: 312 m (1,024 ft)
- Population (2023): 1,640
  - Density: 183/km^{2} (475/sq mi)
- Time zone: UTC+01:00 (CET)
  - Summer (DST): UTC+02:00 (CEST)
- INSEE/Postal code: 63224 /63200
- Website: menetrol.fr
- ^{1} French Land Register data, which excludes lakes, ponds, glaciers > 1 km^{2} (0.386 sq mi or 247 acres) and river estuaries.

Ménétrol (French pronunciation: [menetʁɔl]) is a commune in the Puy-de-Dôme department in Auvergne in central France.

== See also ==
- Communes of the Puy-de-Dôme department
