= Enval =

- Commune
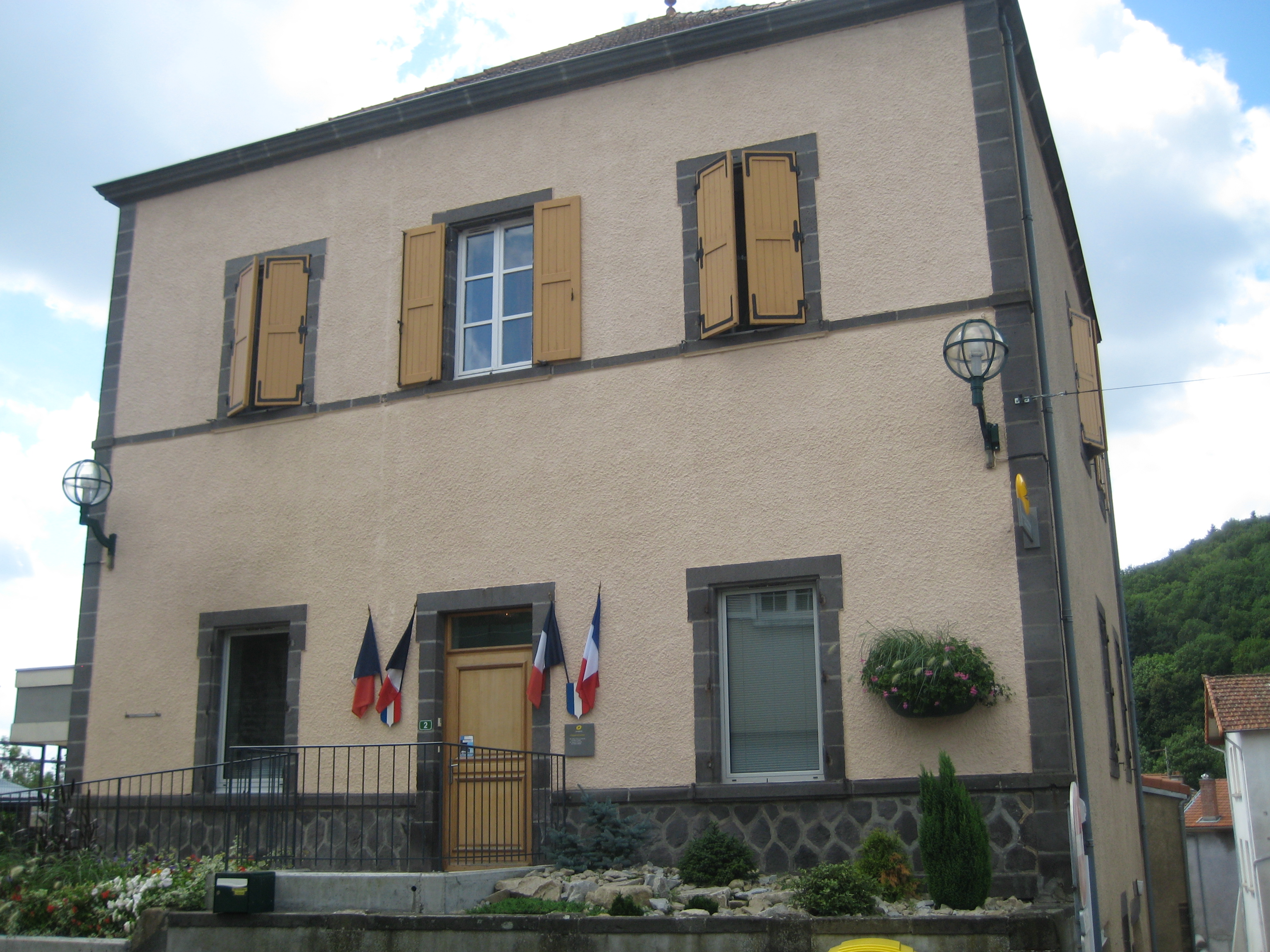
- The town hall in Enval
- Location of Enval
- Location within France Location within Auvergne-Rhône-Alpes
- Coordinates: 45°54′00″N 3°03′01″E
- Country: France
- Region: Auvergne-Rhône-Alpes
- Department: Puy-de-Dôme
- Arrondissement: Riom
- Canton: Châtel-Guyon
- Intercommunality: CA Riom Limagne et Volcans

Government
  - Mayor (2020–2026): Christian Melis
- Area^{1}: 4.87 km^{2} (1.88 sq mi)
- Elevation: 480 m (1,570 ft)
- Highest elevation: 720 m (2,360 ft)
- Lowest elevation: 378 m (1,240 ft)
- Population (2023): 1,596
  - Density: 328/km^{2} (849/sq mi)
- Time zone: UTC+01:00 (CET)
  - Summer (DST): UTC+02:00 (CEST)
- INSEE/Postal code: 63150 /63530
- ^{1} French Land Register data, which excludes lakes, ponds, glaciers > 1 km^{2} (0.386 sq mi or 247 acres) and river estuaries.

Enval (French pronunciation: [ɑ̃val]) is a commune in the Puy-de-Dôme department in Auvergne in central France.

== See also ==
- Communes of the Puy-de-Dôme department
