= Abbey of Saint-Pierre Mozac =

Abbey in Puy-de-Dôme, France

Coordinates: 45°53′25.59″N 3°05′39.11″E

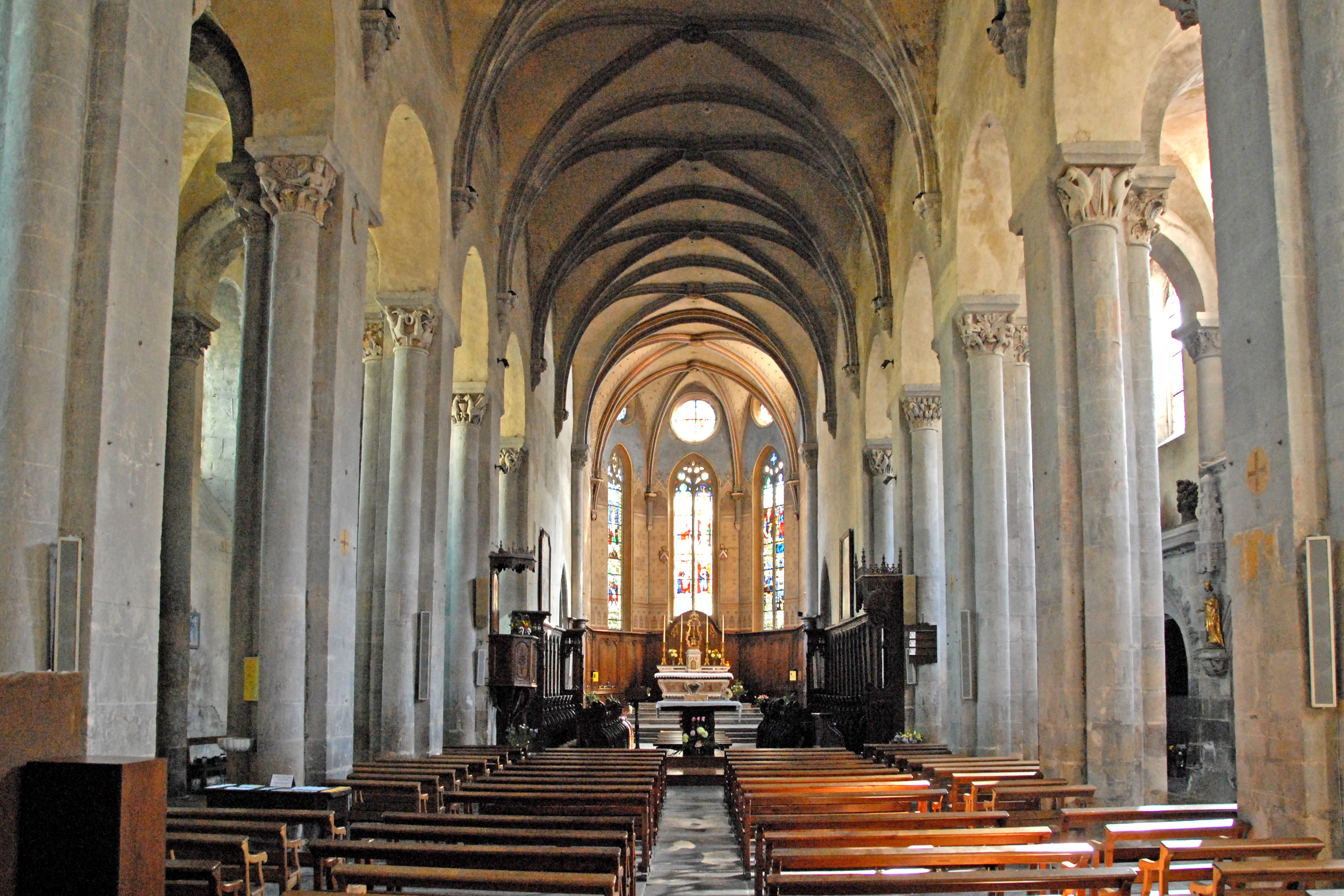
The interior of Mozac Abbey Church

Mozac Abbey is a former Cluniac monastery in the commune of Mozac near Riom in Auvergne, France.

== History ==
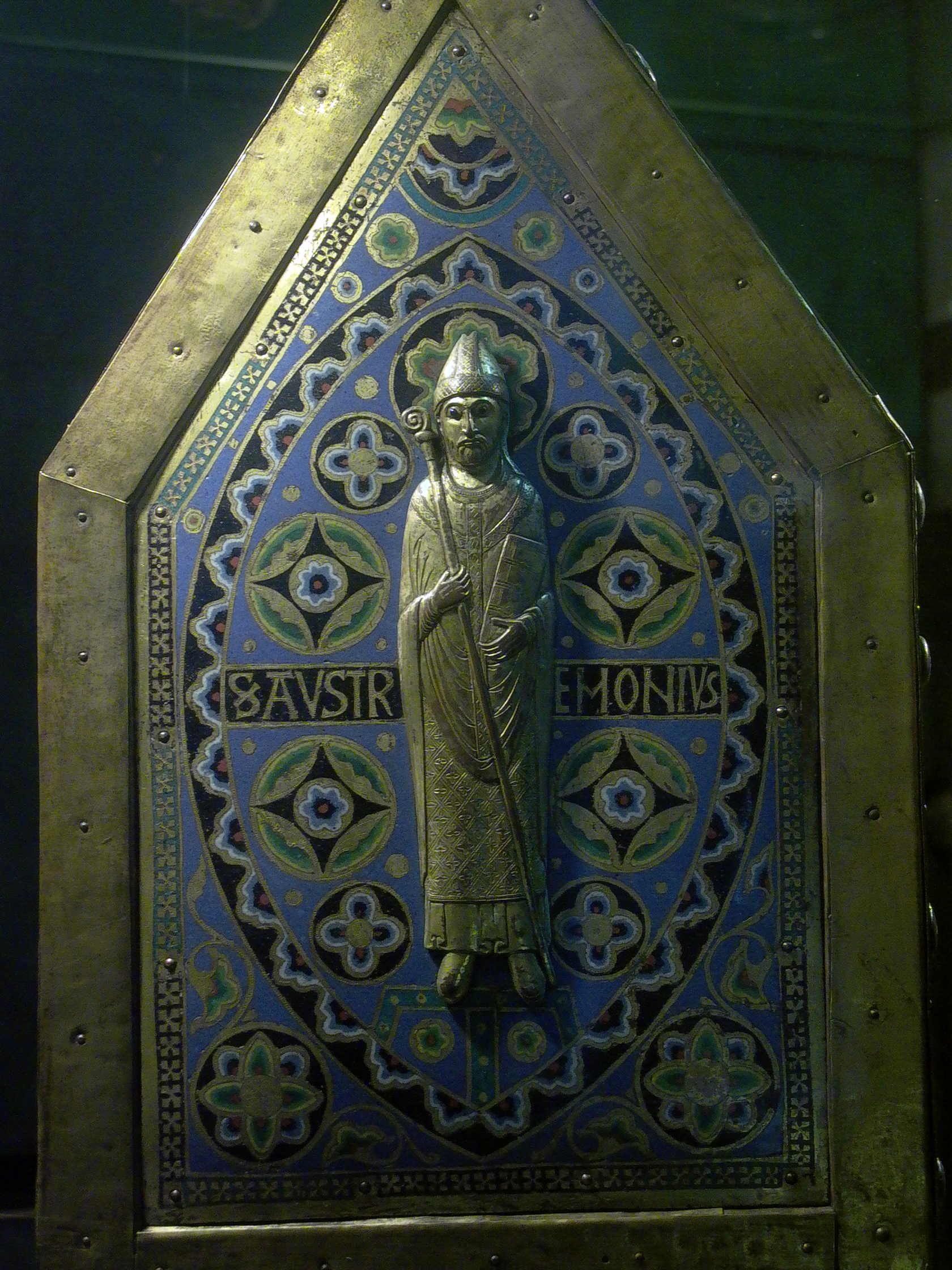
Saint Austremonius, as depicted on the enamelled reliquary of Saint Calmin

A monastery was founded here in either 533 or 680 by Saint Calminius (Saint Calmin) and his wife, Saint Namadia. Calminius is said to have given the new monastery relics of Saint Peter, to whom the foundation was dedicated, and of Saint Caprasius of Agen, brought from Agen, of which there has long been no trace. From "King Pepin", either Pepin the Short in 764 or Pepin II of Aquitaine in 848, the monastery received the relics of Saint Austremonius, first bishop of Clermont and responsible for the evangelisation of the Auvergne; the abbey passed under royal protection. These have survived until today and are preserved in a painted wooden casket of the sixteenth century. The chasse reliquary of Calminius, or Saint Calmin, is one of the outstanding masterpieces of Limoges enamel.

In 1095 Pope Urban II launched the First Crusade at the Council of Clermont and at the same time affiliated Mozac to the Cluniac Order; nevertheless, Mozac was able to retain some of its independence, as it remained an abbey rather than becoming a dependent priory, as were most of Cluny's affiliated houses.

The abbey was rebuilt in the early twelfth century. The buildings were severely damaged and largely destroyed in a series of earthquakes between 1477 and 1490, and among the few remains of the Romanesque architecture that have survived are carved Romanesque capitals (illustration) that were particularly noted by Prosper Mérimée in the first assessment of medieval monuments in France: "What renders the church of Mozat [sic] particularly interesting are its capitals, which, for the merit of their execution, may be compared to the best of Brioude". The rebuilding was carried out in the Gothic style, using the harder Volvic stone instead of the limestone of the earlier constructions.

From 1516 Mozac was ruled by commendatory abbots who were not in residence. In 1790 the abbey was dissolved in the French Revolution. The abbey church survives as the parish church of Mozac.

== Buildings and contents ==
Romanesque capitals with figurative carvings of high quality survive in some quantity, and the church still contains some elements of Romanesque architecture.

The relics of Saint Austremonius are still preserved here, as are those of the founder Saint Calminius, in a chasse reliquary shrine (illustrations of details) which is the largest extant reliquary in mediaeval Limoges enamel in the world.

== List of abbots of Mozac ==
=== Elected by the community ===
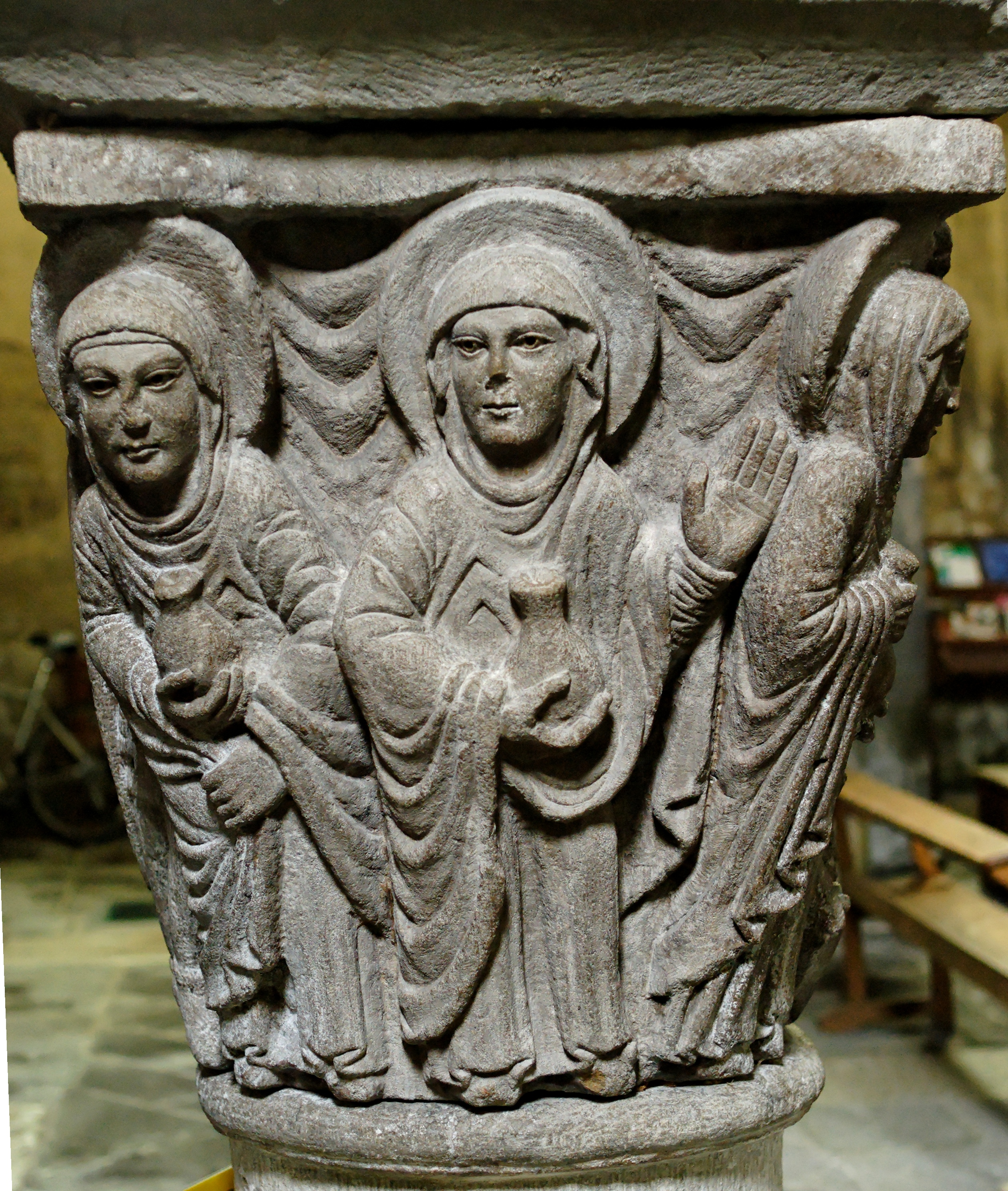
The holy women at the tomb of Christ on a capital preserved from Romanesque Mozac, 12th century

- About 681: Euterius
- 8th century: Lanfred I
- 8th century: Lanfred II
- End of the 9th century: Mansion
- 9th century: Robert
- About 950: Stephen I
- 11th century: Gerald
- About 1061: Peter I
- About 1095: Eustache I de Guignes
- About 1102: Hugues de Semur
- In 1131 and 1147: Eustache II de Montboissier
- In 1168 and 1181: Pierre III de Marsac
- In 1195 and 1197: Guillaume I de Bromont
- About 1205: Eustorge
- About 1212: Géronte de la Tour
- In 1217 and 1243: Aymeric de Mercœur
- About 1245: Pierre IV de Chazelas
- 1252 - 1267: Pierre V d'Ysserpans
- In 1267 and 1269: Aymon I de Vergy
- In 1277 and 1284: Pierre VI de la Ferté-Chauderon
- In 1284 and 1286: Aymon II Brun
- 1286 - 1294: Guillaume II de Saint-Saturnin
- 1294 - 1309: Pierre VII de Vallière
- 1318 - 1343: Guy de Grézolles
- 1343 - 1349: Jean I de Saint-Sernin
- In 1350 and 1352: Bernard de Tranchelyon
- In 1361 and 1377 : Étienne de Cottet
- In 1380 and 1406: Jean II de Laqueuille
- 1406 - 1419: Philibert d'Archimbaud
- 1420 - 1424: Philibert de l'Espinasse
- 1424 - 1458: Louis I de Banson
- 1459 - 1470: Raymond de Marcenat
- 1479 - 1509: Jean III de Marcenat
- 1510 - 1515: Louis II de Chassaigne

=== Commendatory abbots ===
- 1516 - 1524 : Claude Duprat
- 1524–1528 : Thomas Duprat
- 1529–1560 : Guillaume Duprat
- 1568–1570 : Sébastien de l'Aubespine
- 1571–1610 : Nicolas de Neuville de Villeroy
- 1613–1640 : Antoine Rigoulet
- 1641–1655 : Camille de Neuville de Villeroy
- 1655–1705 : François d'Albon
- 1705–1719 : Joseph-Michel Archon
- 1720–1736 : François Ferrand de Cossey (or d'Escossay)
- 1739–1764 : Louis-Charles Baudouin
- 1764–1789 : Jean Fau de Raze
