= Mozac =

- Commune
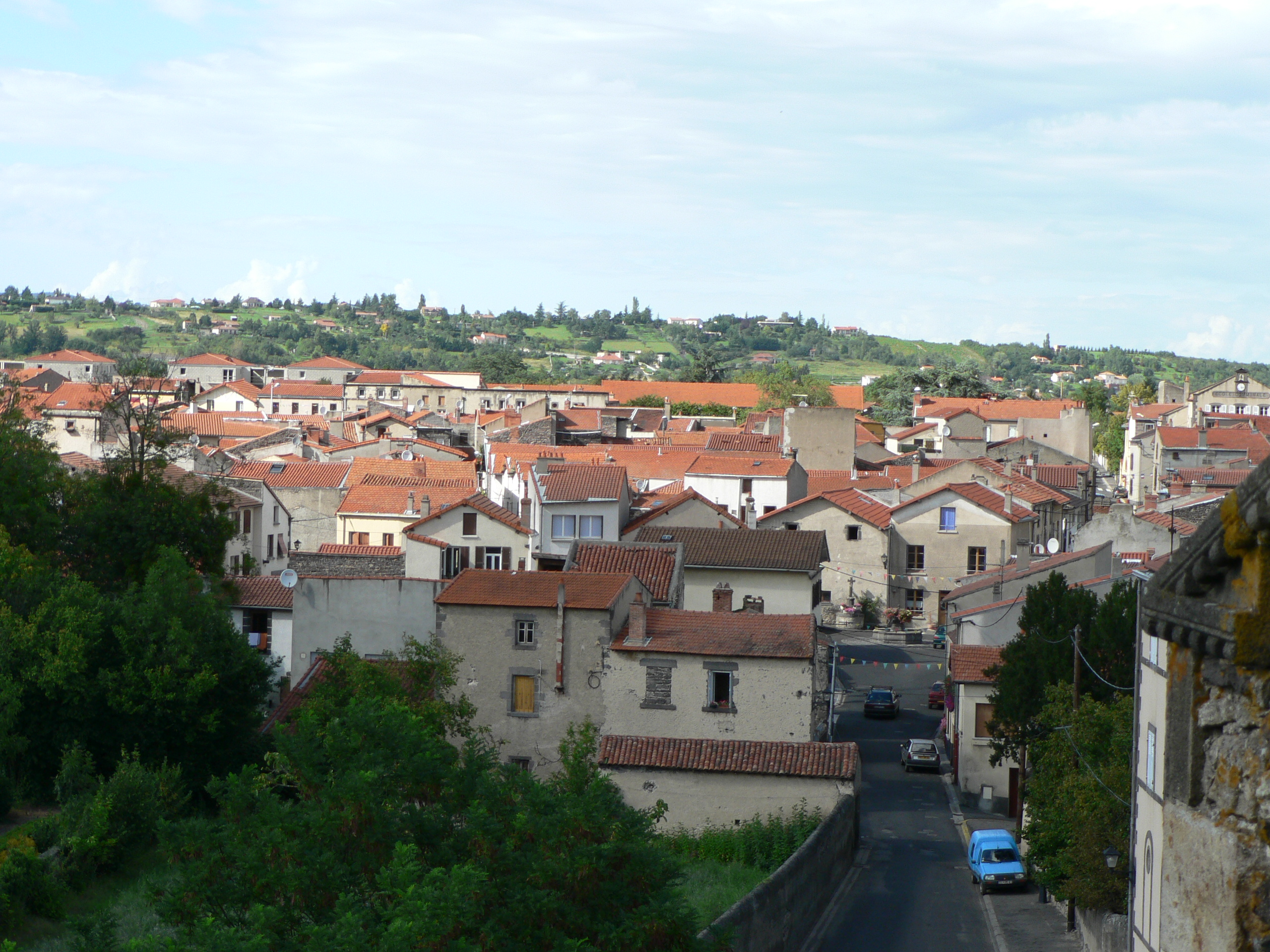
- View of the centre of the village of Mozac

- Coat of arms
- Location of Mozac
- Location within France Location within Auvergne-Rhône-Alpes
- Coordinates: 45°52′23″N 3°04′59″E
- Country: France
- Region: Auvergne-Rhône-Alpes
- Department: Puy-de-Dôme
- Arrondissement: Riom
- Canton: Châtel-Guyon
- Intercommunality: CA Riom Limagne et Volcans

Government
  - Mayor (2020–2026): Marc Regnoux
- Area^{1}: 4.04 km^{2} (1.56 sq mi)
- Elevation: 350 m (1,150 ft)
- Highest elevation: 424 m (1,391 ft)
- Lowest elevation: 340 m (1,120 ft)
- Population (2023): 3,957
  - Density: 979/km^{2} (2,540/sq mi)
- Time zone: UTC+01:00 (CET)
  - Summer (DST): UTC+02:00 (CEST)
- INSEE/Postal code: 63245 /63200
- ^{1} French Land Register data, which excludes lakes, ponds, glaciers > 1 km^{2} (0.386 sq mi or 247 acres) and river estuaries.

Mozac (French pronunciation: [mɔzak]) is a commune in the Puy-de-Dôme department in Auvergne in central France.

== Population ==
Historical population
Year	Pop.	±% p.a.
1968	1,795	—
1975	2,127	+2.45%
1982	3,057	+5.32%
1990	3,496	+1.69%
1999	3,671	+0.54%
2007	3,510	−0.56%
2012	3,777	+1.48%
2017	3,878	+0.53%
2023	3,957	+0.34%
Source: INSEE

== See also ==
- Communes of the Puy-de-Dôme department
