= Saint Calminius =

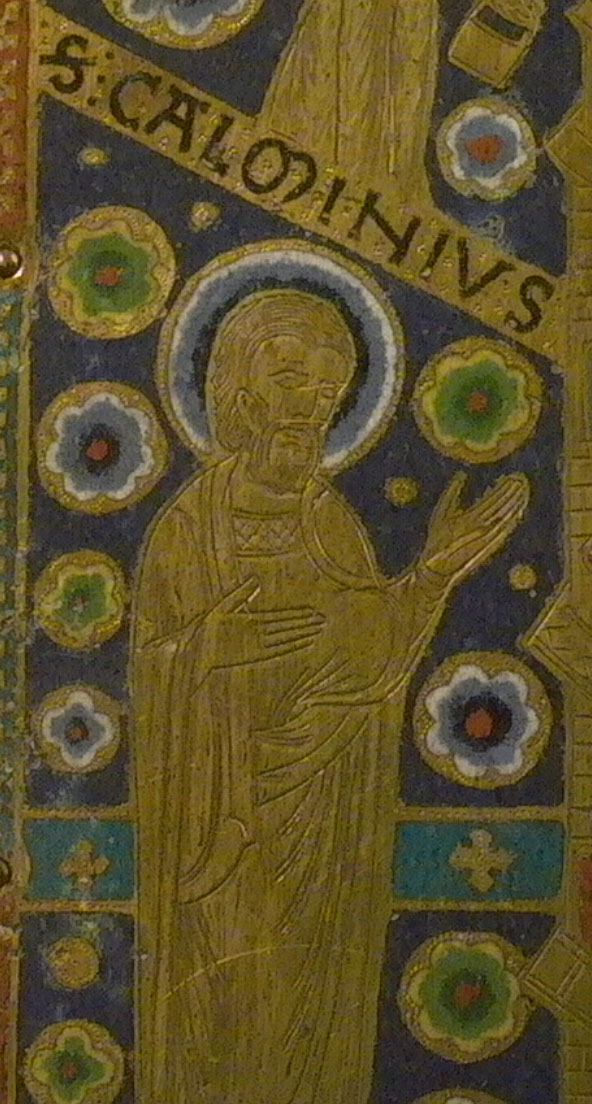
- Saint Calmin as portrayed on the reliquary
- Died: 6th or 7th centuries
- Venerated in: Roman Catholic Church, Eastern Orthodox Church
- Major shrine: Mozac
- Feast: August 19

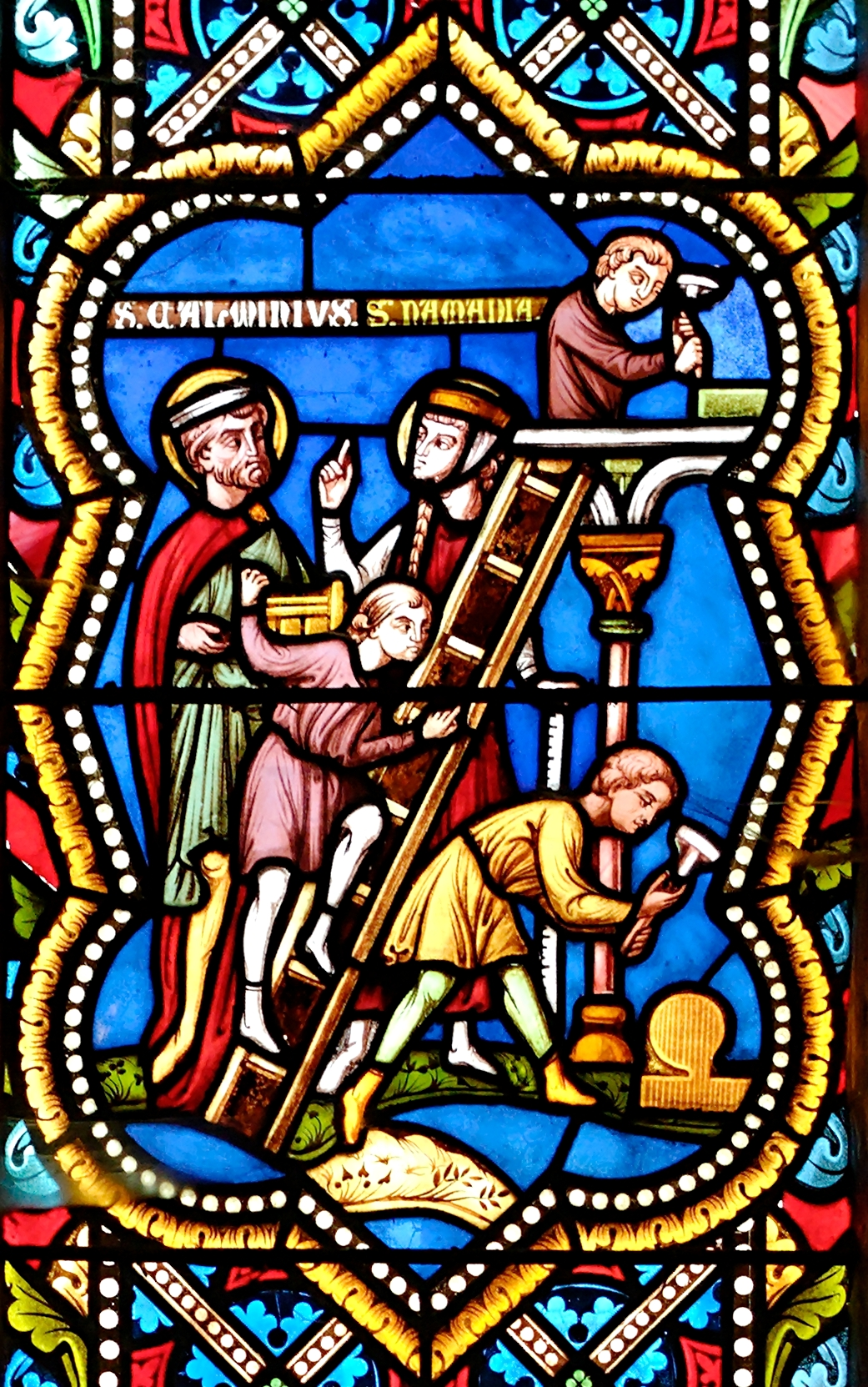
St. Calminius and St. Namadia at the foundation of an abbey. Stained glass window by Félix Gaudin (1851-1930), abbey-church in Mozac.

Calminius, also known as Calmin, founded three French abbeys in the 6th or 7th centuries AD: Mozac Abbey, in Puy-de-Dôme; Laguenne Abbey (near Tulle, Corrèze) and the abbey of Monastier-Saint-Chaffre. His Saint's day is August 19.

His widow, Namadie (Latin: Namadia), became a nun at Marsat. Their remains were conserved in the abbey church at Mozac in the 12th-century Saint Calminius Reliquary.

== Biography ==
The Life of Saint Calmin is more a literary document than an historical record, in order to embellish the past of the founder of the Abbey of Mozac. By glorifying Calmin, the fame of the monastery is strengthened. His hagiographer seems to have exaggerated the titles of the founder of the abbey of Mozac. Indeed, the duchy of Aquitaine was later constituted in the 9th century. In the same way, the title of Count of Auvergne does not appear until around 980.

Calminius is descended from a family of Roman origin who came to settle in Clermont. He holds the title of Duke of Aquitaine (Calminius dux Aquitaniæ) and Count of Auvergne and some possessions, however in the 7th century, the Auvergne is disputed between Franks and Aquitans.

Calminius is initially a man of war, but he resolves to live in the austerity of religious life. From then on, he decides to build three monasteries. He began by going to the Velay mountains to the place called Le Villars, where he founded an oratory, Saint-Chaffre du Monastier. A few cenobites joined him, and the place became a real monastery which originally bore the name Calminiacum.

Then he left for the bishopric of Limoges, where he began a hermit's existence. When he resurfaced, he founded his second monastery near Tulle. This establishment is more precisely called Laguenne. The people already consider him a "saint".

But he prefers to end his days in Auvergne. Long before his death, he settled in Mozac, a place conducive to meditation since it is calm and abounds in water. He founded his last abbey there. Before the construction of Mozac Abbey, Calminius went to Rome to obtain the consecration of the first monastery, Carmery en Velay. On his return, he passed through the islands of Lérins. Admiring the famous abbey on the Ile Saint-Honorat, he stayed there for several months. There, he learns the rule of Saint Benedict. The abbot of Lérins authorizes him to take about twenty monks to help him found his monastery in Mozac.

After its construction, Calminius leaves his companions again to go one last time to Rome. Arriving in Italy, he meets the Pope to tell him of his humble desire to enrich his last foundation. The pope offered him a part of the skull of Saint Peter (hence the name of Saint Peter's Abbey of Mozac). On his way back, he stopped in Agen where he obtained a portion of the arm of Saint Caprais. Mozac immediately enjoyed the reputation of its patron.

His return to Mozac is celebrated with great pomp, so happy are the monks to see their community enjoying such great wealth and influence. Shortly afterwards, Calmin dies in "odour of sanctity". He is buried in the crypt the day after the octave of the Ascension, but the year of his death remains unknown.

During the Middle Ages, there was a country chapel named of Saint-Calmin, on the road between Riom and Mozac. This chapel was destroyed long before the Revolution. Neither its architectural importance nor its exact location is known. However, it must have been located in the area still called Saint-Calmin today, less than 500 m east of the abbey. The main road in this district is called, in Riom as in Mozac, the rue Saint-Calmin. The only indirect vestige of the Saint-Calmin church is a stone cross standing at the crossroads between the boundaries of Mozac and Riom. For safety reasons, it has been moved to the side of the road.

== Reliquary ==
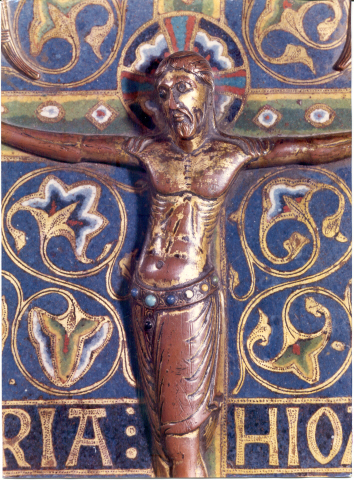
Detail of the crucifixion on the casket.

The Saint Calminius Reliquary (French – châsse de saint Calmin) is the 12th-century chasse-form reliquary which was the main object in the treasury of Mozac Abbey (45.8906°N 3.0947°E). It contains the bones of Calminius and his wife Namadie.

The structure is of wood and measures 81 × 24 cm x 45 cm. Fourteen copper plaques have been attached, which are enameled using the champlevé technique (gaps are carved in the metal, into which molten enamel is poured before firing). The box is in the shape of a church without a transept or choir. It is decorated with Limoges champlevé enamel, depicting scenes from the life of the saint and his wife, in particular the foundation of the three institutions and his funeral.

It was permanently exhibited on the south arm of the transept of the abbey church. It was hidden and saved in 1789 during the French Revolution by a villager and municipal councillor Jean Ozenne (1756–1832). It is now housed in the Musée Dobrée.

== Bibliography and sources ==
- Charte du roi Pépin, pour la donation et la restauration du monastère de Mozac, datée de la vingt-quatrième année du règne de Pépin, roi des Francs, BNF, collection Moreau, vol. 284, Fol. 160.
- Léon Levillain, « La translation des reliques de saint Austremoine à Mozac et le diplôme de Pépin II d'Aquitaine (863) », dans Le Moyen Âge, 2nd series, volume VIII, July - August 1904, p. 281-337.
- R.P.F. Thomas d'Aquin de Saint-Joseph Carme Déchaussé, Histoire de la vie de saint Calmine (sic) duc d'Aquitaine, fondateur des monastères de Saint-Théophrède en Velay et de Mosac en Auvergne, patron de l'église de Laguenne proche de Tulle, 1646.
- Paul Guérin, Les petits Bollandistes : vies des saints, tome X, Paris, Bloud et Barral, 1876, p. 20 et suivantes.
