= Sebaldus =

German saint

Saint Sebaldus
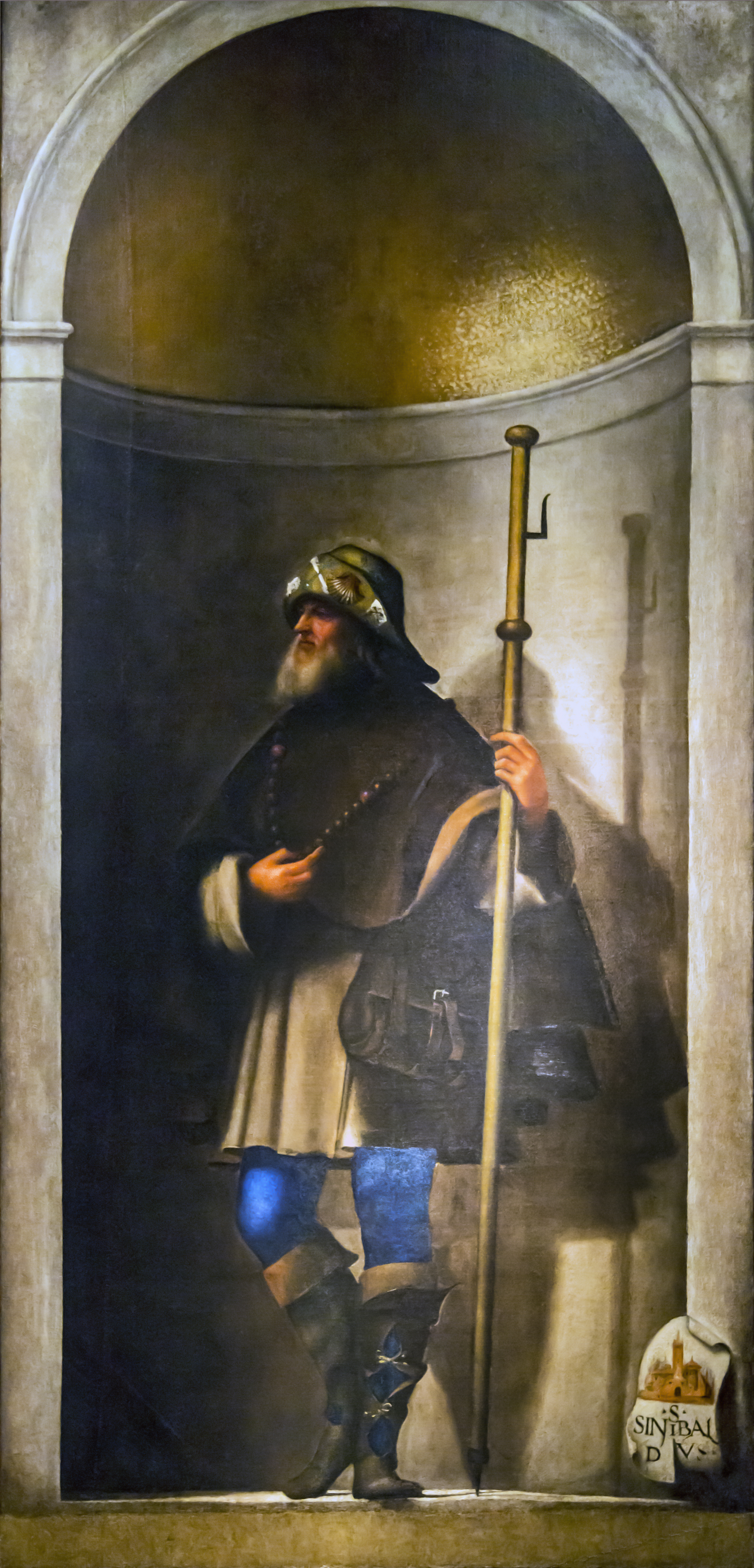
- Saint Sebaldus by Sebastiano del Piombo in Gallerie dell'Accademia in Venice

Missionary
- Died: c. 770
- Venerated in: Catholic Church; Eastern Orthodox Church
- Canonized: March 26, 1425 by Pope Martin V
- Major shrine: St. Sebaldus Church
- Feast: August 19
- Attributes: pilgrim with a staff; later represented with the model of his church
- Patronage: against cold and cold weather; Nuremberg; Bavaria

Sebaldus (or Sebald) was an Anglo-Saxon missionary to Germany in the 9th or 10th century. He settled down as a hermit in the Reichswald near Nuremberg, of which city he is the patron saint.

== Legends ==
Almost all details of the life of Sebaldus are uncertain, beyond his presence in the woodland of Poppenreuth, west of Nuremberg, which was explained by his being a hermit. However various legends about his life have been recorded.

=== Origins ===
One of the earliest legends (c. 1280) claims Sebaldus was a contemporary of Henry III (died 1056) and was of Franconian origin. After a pilgrimage in Italy, he became a preacher at Nuremberg. Another text claims that he was a Frankish nobleman who met Willibald and Winibald in Italy (thus dating his life to the 8th century) and later became a missionary in the Sebalder Reichswald that is associated with his name. Other legends claim he was either the son of the king of Denmark or a student in Paris who married a French princess, but then abandoned her on their wedding night to go on a pilgrimage to Rome. In these versions of the legend, the Pope gave Sebaldus the mission of evangelising in the forests of Nuremberg, thereby ascribing to his ancient presence there papal authority.

=== Miracles ===
Throughout his life, Sebaldus is said to have performed some miracles. As recorded on his shrine, Sebaldus' hagiography includes feats such as the curing of blindness, refilling a jug of wine from thin air, and invoking the wrath of God to have a mocker swallowed up by the earth. Among the most popular legends associated with Sebaldus is the "Miracle of the Icicles." The story, as recounted by the English hagiographer Alban Butler, holds that during a snowy night in the dead of winter, Sebaldus took shelter in the hovel of a poor peasant family, but found that their weak fire could provide little relief from the elements. When Sebaldus suggested that more fuel be added, the poor man replied that this meagre kindling was all he could afford. Sebaldus turned to the man's wife and told her to break off the icicles hanging from the house's eaves, bundle them, and bring them to him. When she did this, Sebaldus threw the icicles into their hearth, which came to life in the form of a roaring, radiant fire.

== Veneration ==
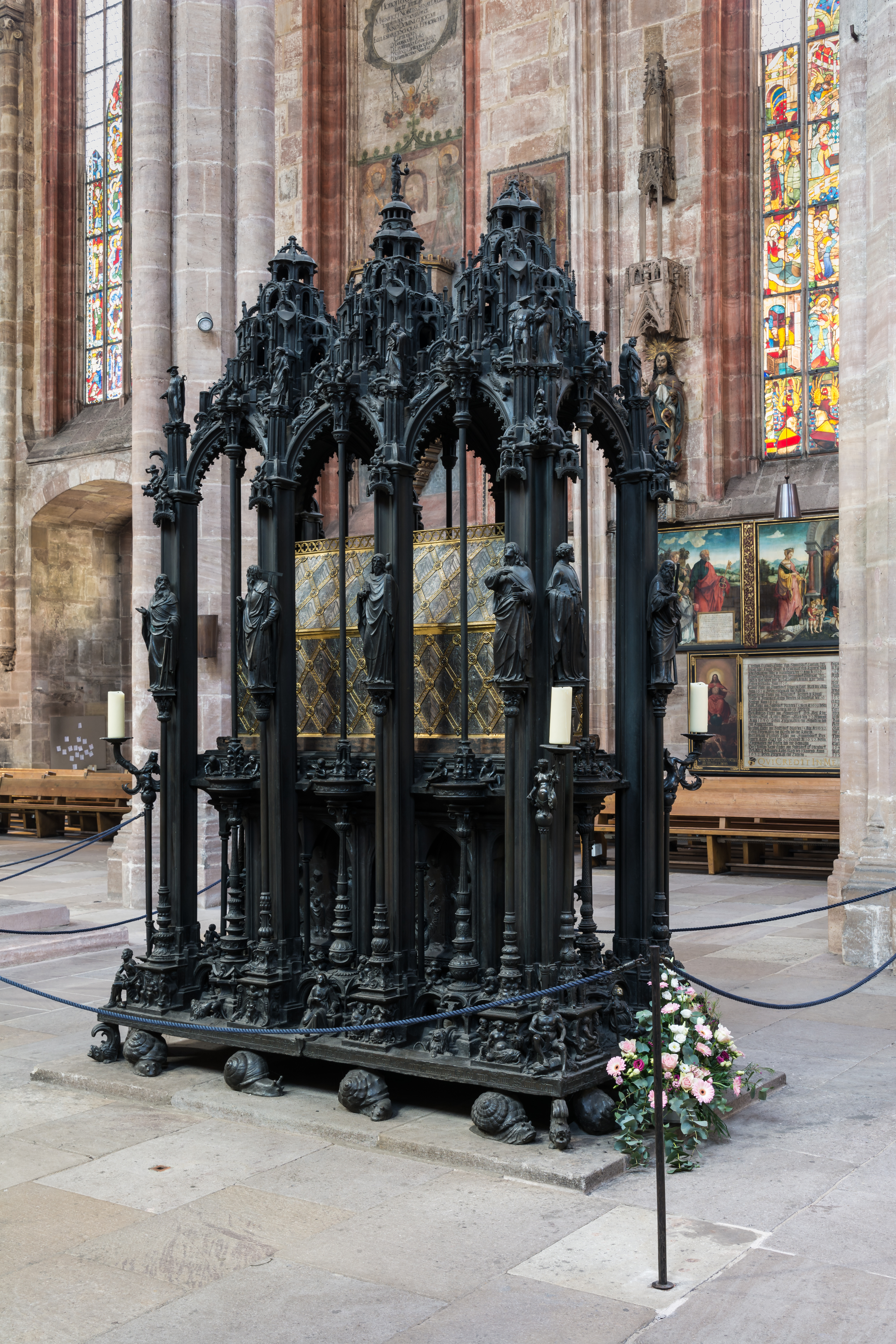
Shrine of St. Sebaldus (containing his relics) in the Sebalduskirche at Nuremberg, the masterpiece of Peter Vischer the Elder and his sons, 1508–1519

Despite the obscure origins and uncertain historicity of the saint himself, the cult of Sebaldus has long been associated with Nuremberg, a city that fostered the cult and became a place of pilgrimage. The earliest existence of his cult can be dated to the late eleventh century, with a passing reference under the year 1072 in the chronicle of Lambert of Hersfeld. In 1255, he became the co-patron, with Saint Peter, of the newly rebuilt parochial church, where his tomb was venerated.

The feast day of St Sebaldus, as August 19, appeared in a calendar of Olomouc of 1131–1137, and many children born in that city bore the saint's name. The relics of the saint were translated in 1397 to the new choir of the church of Saint Sebaldus, and every year his relics were carried in procession. The kings and emperors of Germany, when in Nuremberg, customarily prayed before his reliquary.

On March 26, 1425, he was formally canonized by Pope Martin V, following a request by the Council of Nuremberg. In 1429, florins from Nuremberg began to bear his image. A Latin Vita Sancti Sebaldi ('Life of St. Sebaldus') was written about 1480 by Sigmund Meisterlin, a peripatetic Benedictine monk who spent some time at Augsburg.

In 1508–1519, Peter Vischer the Elder and his sons fabricated the celebrated Late Gothic bronze tomb in the Church of St. Sebaldus, considered a masterpiece of the German Renaissance. The cult survived the Reformation. In Italy, where he is venerated as San Sinibaldo, an altar was dedicated to him in the Venetian church of San Bartolomeo sul Rialto. In the same church, in 1507, Sebastiano del Piombo painted a representation of Sebald.

== Literature ==
- Collins, David J. "The Holy Recluses." In Reforming Saints: Saints' Lives and Their Authors in Germany, 1470-1530, pp. 51–74. Oxford Studies in Historical Theology. Oxford: Oxford University Press, 2008.
