= Saint Maginus =

Spanish saint

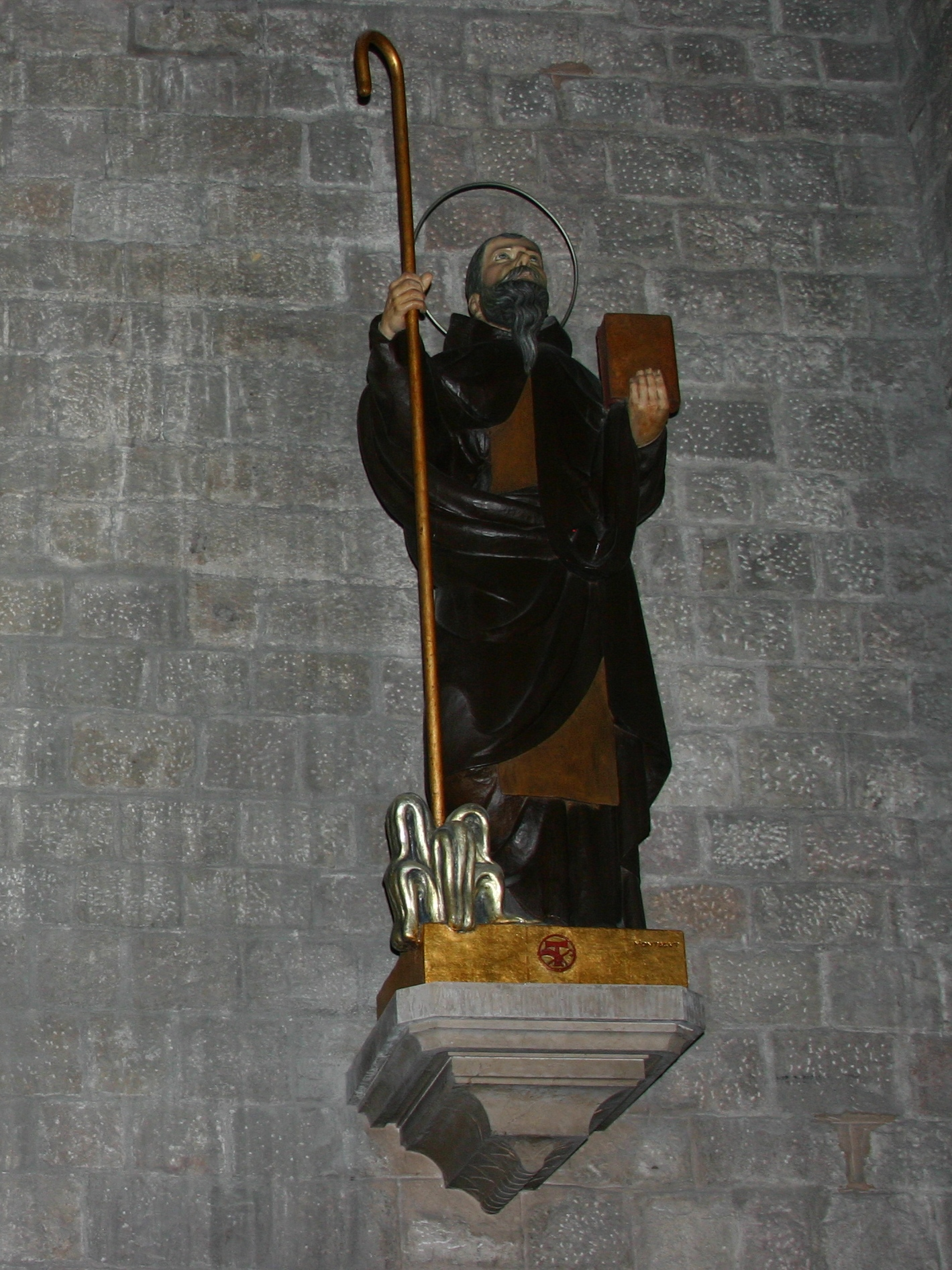
Statue of Saint Maginus in Santa Maria del Mar, Barcelona.

Saint Maginus (Catalan: Sant Magí; Spanish: San Magín) was a Catalan hermit in the late third and early fourth centuries in Tarragona. Orphaned early, he was a hermit in a cave on Mount Brufaganya for thirty years.

Upon the arrival of the Roman prefect Dacian to Tarragona, persecuting Christians under the edict of Emperor Maximian, Maginus tried to convert them to the faith and was imprisoned. Freed miraculously, he left the city by a gate now called Sant Magí, where he dedicated a chapel and returned to Mount Brufaganya.

Captured in the cave again, he was taken to Tarragona and transferred to Gaià, where he was beheaded on 25 August 306.

He is the patron saint of Tarragona and his feast day is on August 19.
