= Credan =

8th-century abbot of Evesham Abbey and saint

Saint Credan of Evesham

Abbot
- Died: 19 August 780
- Honored in: Roman Catholic Church; Eastern Orthodox Church
- Feast: 19 August

Saint Credan of Evesham (died 19 August 780) is a saint in the calendar of the Roman Catholic Church and of the Eastern Orthodox Church. He is also known in Latin as Credus or Credanus.

== Life and cult ==
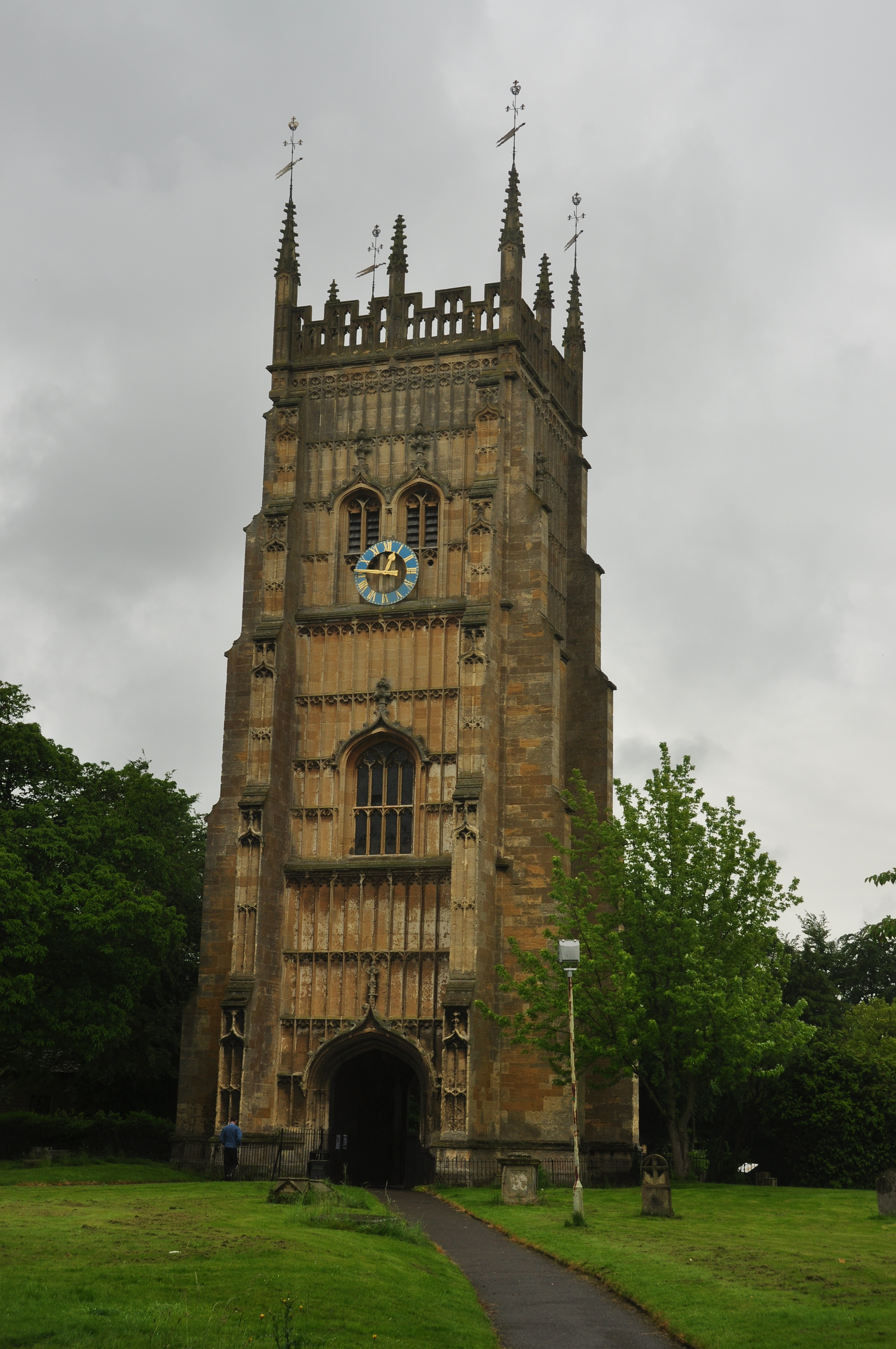
Evesham Abbey bell tower

Credan was the Abbot of the Benedictine Abbey at Evesham, England, during the reign of King Offa of Mercia. His office is attested by charters in King Offa's reign, but no details of Credan's life have been preserved.

Relics of St Credan at Evesham Abbey were put through an ordeal by fire in 1077, apparently because of Norman suspicion of this local saint, about whom little was known. The ordeal was conducted by the new Norman abbot, Walter de Cerisy, who, after consultation with Archbishop Lanfranc, ordered a three-day fast, and had the seven penitential psalms and appropriate litanies chanted while the sanctity of the bones was tested by fire. According to legend, the relics not only survived but shone like gold when moved to a place of devotion. This may, however, be a confusion with a similar account of the uncovering of St Credan's bones by Abbot Mannig when his cult was originally developed. It is said that Mannig "was frequently admonished in vision to take up the holy Abbot's relics and lay them in a shrine. When at length he came with great solemnity to do this, the body was found between two others, but distinguished from them by the great brightness with which it shone."

The shrine established for St Credan by Walter of Cerisy in 1277 was one of only three to survive the destruction of the Abbey sanctuary when the tower of Evesham fell in 1207, and this was also thought to be miraculous.

Credan's feast day, celebrated in both the Roman Catholic and Orthodox Churches, is 19 August, which was the day of his death in 780.

== Cornwall ==
Credan is sometimes reputed to have founded the church of Sancreed in Cornwall, which is named for St. Credan, but there were other Cornish saints of this name whose names may have been confused with his. A more likely candidate is St. Credan of Cornwall, a follower of Saint Petroc. This is the St. Credan who is said to have accidentally killed his own father, by which he was so moved as to abandon the world and become a hogherd, and lived so exemplary as he was after esteemed a saint. His feast day is observed on 11 May. The Cornish Ancient Sites Protection Network (CASPN) considers Credan of Cornwall to be "mythological".
