= Marsat =

- Commune
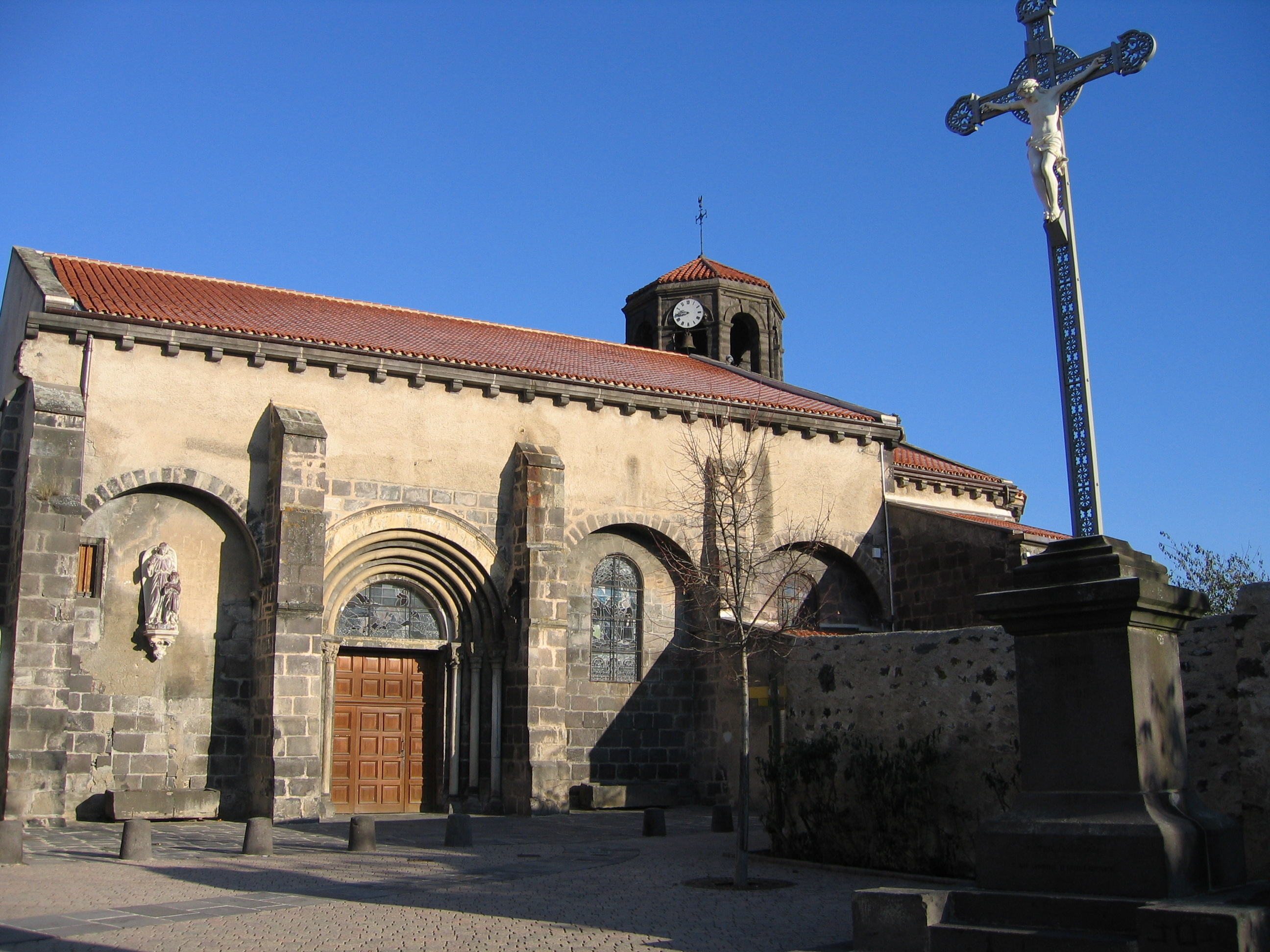
- The church of Notre-Dame of Marsat

- Coat of arms
- Location of Marsat
- Location within France Location within Auvergne-Rhône-Alpes
- Coordinates: 45°52′38″N 3°04′57″E
- Country: France
- Region: Auvergne-Rhône-Alpes
- Department: Puy-de-Dôme
- Arrondissement: Riom
- Canton: Châtel-Guyon
- Intercommunality: CA Riom Limagne et Volcans

Government
  - Mayor (2026–32): Anne-Catherine Lafarge
- Area^{1}: 4.08 km^{2} (1.58 sq mi)
- Highest elevation: 517 m (1,696 ft)
- Lowest elevation: 348 m (1,142 ft)
- Population (2023): 1,426
  - Density: 350/km^{2} (905/sq mi)
- Time zone: UTC+01:00 (CET)
  - Summer (DST): UTC+02:00 (CEST)
- INSEE/Postal code: 63212 /63200
- ^{1} French Land Register data, which excludes lakes, ponds, glaciers > 1 km^{2} (0.386 sq mi or 247 acres) and river estuaries.

Marsat (French pronunciation: [maʁsa]) is a commune in the Puy-de-Dôme department in Auvergne in central France.

== See also ==
- Communes of the Puy-de-Dôme department
