= Bacini =

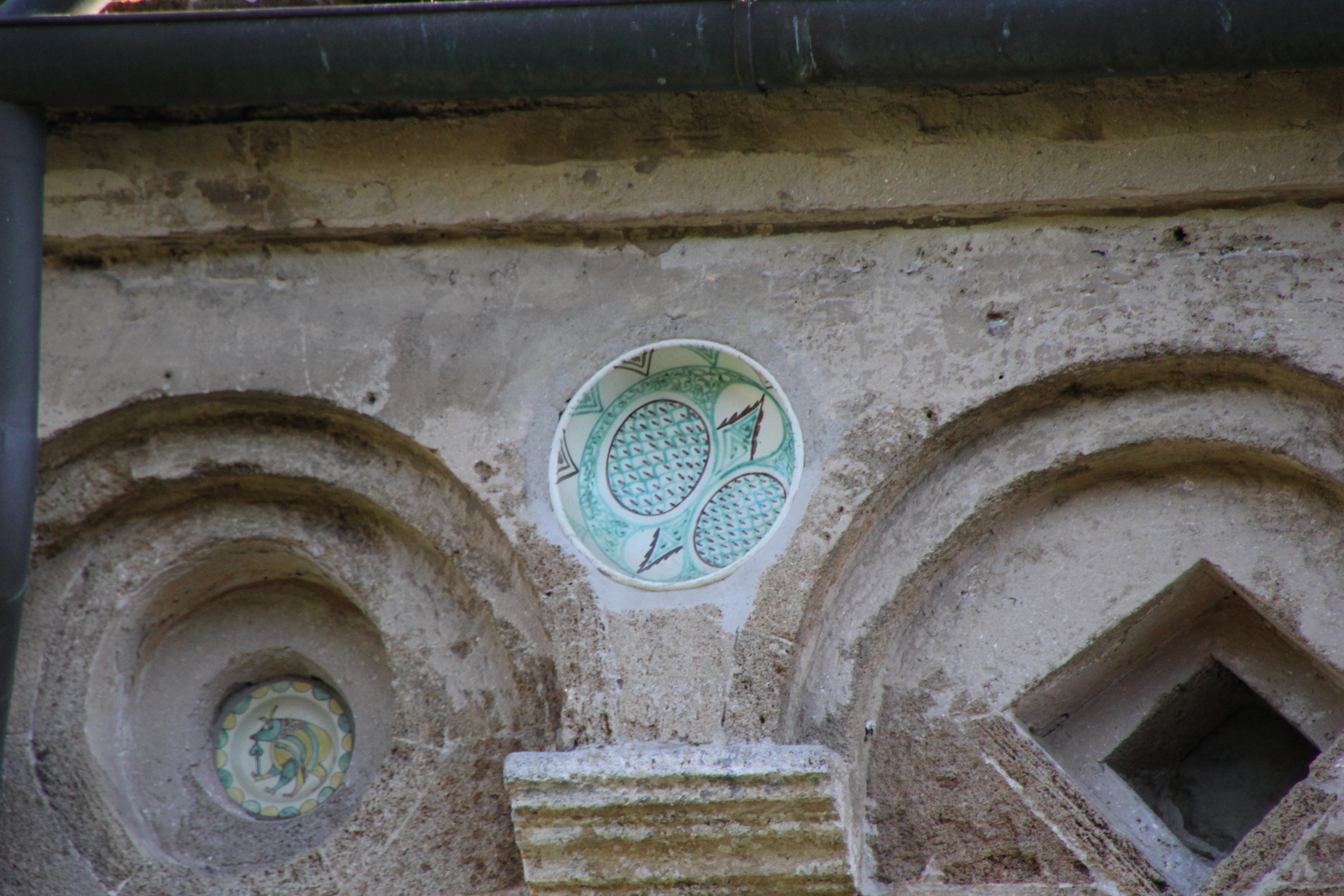
Bacino (in the center). Basilica di San Pietro Apostolo, Pisa

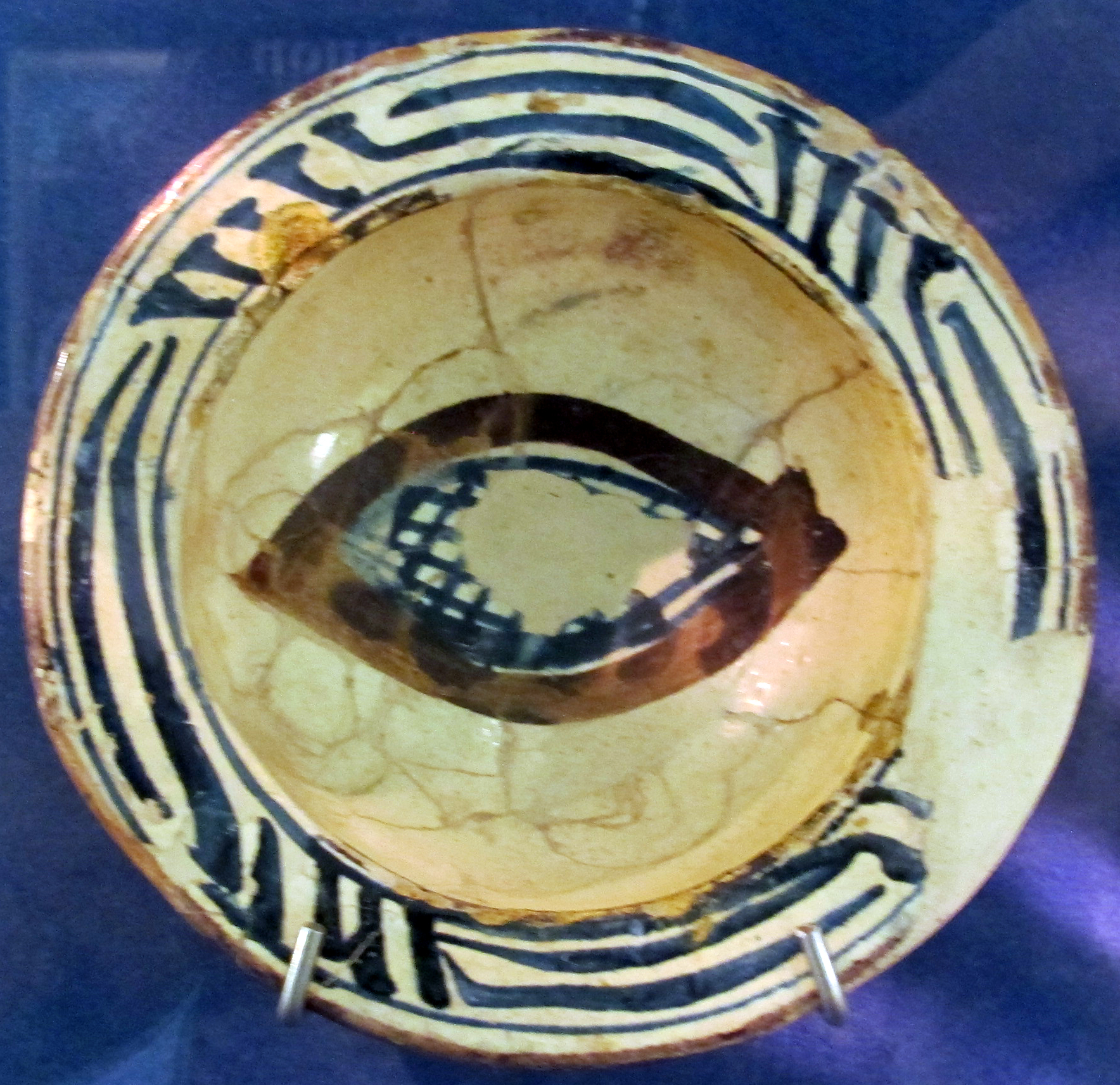

In architecture, bacini (plural, singular Italian: bacino, IPA: [baˈtʃiːno], "bowl") are ceramic bowls that were used for decoration in the medieval Europe. The bowls were embedded into the external walls of (mostly religious) buildings and are thus also known as immured vessels. Bacini represent one of the traits of the Pisan Romanesque style. They can also be found in the Byzantine and Gothic buildings.

== Term ==
The Italian word "bacini" is used in many languages in the modern sense - to designate glazed vessels that were not specifically designed as architectural decorations, but were used for that purpose - since at least the 18th-19th centuries. The term does not define a particular type of the vessel that is immured: both bowls and plates had been used as bacini.

== Geography ==
Regarding the bacini's origins, most scholars declare them to be a medieval - and European - invention. However, some researchers point to few immured cups found in the buildings of Ostia Antica and Islamic architecture that extensively used the glazed ceramics (but not bacini). Megaw thinks that the practice spread to Italy from the Byzantine Empire.

The bacini were most popular in Italy, but their use was widespread between late 10th and 15th centuries, primarily in the coastal regions of the Mediterranean. The bowls can be found in the buildings of Spain (Seville, Zaragoza, Calatayud, Teruel), Southern France, Sardinia, and Corsica. In Northern Italy bacini can be found both on the coast and inland, in Liguria, Veneto, Padua, Verona, Lombardy, Ticino (now in Switzerland), Piedmont, Emilia Romagna, Umbria, and Abruzzo. The largest concentration is in Tuscany (especially in the vicinity of Pisa) and Lazio. While common in Rome, very few examples can be found farther south in Campagna, Apulia, Calabria, and Sicily. To the east, bacini appear on the Dalmatian coast (Zadar, Trogir) and continue into the Byzantine territory, including areas of Greece.

In Italy, the number of buildings decorated with immured bowls in a single city varies: 4-10 in Milan, Ferrara, Ravenna, Genoa, Lucca, Sassari, Ascoli Piceno, 15 in Pavia and Bologna, more than 20 in Rome and Pisa.

After the 15th century, bacini were used only "sporadically".

== Suppliers ==
The bowls were not ordered specifically for decorating the buildings, they were simply selected from regular (and expensive) dishware. There is no evidence of selecting particular drawings or even colors. For a long time the bacini were imported. While Italian pieces appeared in the 13th century (in Liguria), they only started to constitute the majority of the supply since the 14th century (and the importation never stopped). Imported pieces were coming from al-Andalus, Egypt, Maghreb, Balearic Islands, later - from Sicily, Southern Italy, Byzantine Empire. Part of the bacini's attraction apparently came from the exotic sourcing: there were very few cases of bacini used for decoration in places where they were manufactured (like Sicily).

== Technique ==
Bacini were used in quantity, buildings with just one or two installed are rare. Some churches in Pisa (San Piero a Grado, San Martino, Santa Cecilia) had over 200 bacini each. The location of bacini in the building varied, but typically they were placed high up: at the clerestory level, in the blind arcades, on the sides of bell towers. Occasionally, the bowls on the facades were arranged into a figure of cross. Five-bacini crosses were popular in Crete, and are quite rare in mainland Greece and Italy. The places for the bacini were designed into the buildings: stones or bricks were cut or shifted to create the space for ceramics; once the piece was placed, the subsequent layers of masonry frequently blocked it in place, thus convincing the future researchers in the contemporaneity of the building and the bowls immured in its walls.

== Pisa ==
Pisa had a special affinity with bacini – about two thousand of these pieces were installed over five centuries. Hundreds of the bowls survived.

The 11th-century churches of Pisa originally had more than four hundred bacini, by 1970, only 146 were remaining. At this time, as part of the conservation work in Pisa, the bacini were removed from the buildings and replaced by replicas, an extensive catalog was published in 1981 (superseded by a new book in 2011). Graziella Berti suggested that the bacini and the initial church construction were contemporaneous, as places were left for these decorations while the buildings were erected. However, since few churches in Pisa date back to the early 11th century (San Piero a Grado, San Zeno, San Matteo), this suggestion provide very early chronological dating for the bacini, 50 to 100 years out of alignment with, for example, Spain. All 11th-century bowls were sourced from the Islamic territories on the Mediterranean, production in Italy had started in the late 12th century.

Most of the Islamic bacini were imported from North Africa. Multiple gazing techniques were used, mostly lead glaze and tin glaze.

The subjects, colors, and quality of painting on the bacini vary greatly. Most of the drawings involve geometric and floral shapes, some have Arabic writing or some resemblance of it, but there are also mythical and real animals (primarily birds), and a single human figure (at San Sisto). While some bacini exhibit good artistic skills and glazing craftmanship, many have low quality with imprecise figures and glazing (perhaps, they had been selected from discards). Apparently, since the bacini were located high on the walls and were not supposed to be seen up close, their quality did not matter, sometimes they were even placed upside down.

As the images on the bacini appear to be unimportant to the builders, a question of their purpose arises. At the time Pisa already had a tradition of polychromic architecture, so it is possible that they were considered a low-cost alternative to stone medallions and spolia. The other explanations include bacini being symbolic spoils of wars that Pisa successfully waged at the time, emblems of the Crusader/trader mentality, declaration of prosperity and rivalry with other maritime republics.

The bacini went out of fashion in the 15th century, so the 16th- and 17th-century renovations in many cases covered the ceramics, cut new windows in place of bacini, or replace them with non-polychrome structures.

== Byzantine ==
The Byzantine architecture mostly did not adorn the church facades with colors: the appearance of the buildings was either grayish-white (stone, marble, mortar) or red (bricks). Bacini represented one of the two major exceptions to this rule (the other being glazed quatrefoils).

Bacini were common in Byzantine churches in the 11th and 12th century, many of them fell out or had been removed later. The tradition was kept beyond the Latin occupation. The biggest group of churches with bacini in the area, a total of 291, is located in Crete, almost evenly split between Rethymnon, Herakleion, Lasithi, and Chania, primarily in the hinterland.

The fact that the bowls were attached to the buildings during the construction is used for chronological dating of ceramics or the buildings.

== Sources ==
- Mathews, Karen Rose (2014). "Other Peoples' Dishes: Islamic Bacini on Eleventh-Century Churches in Pisa". Gesta. 53 (1): 5–23. doi:10.1086/675415. ISSN 0016-920X.
- Collareta, Marco (2022). "Art in Pisa in the Middle Ages". In Mathews, Karen Rose; Orvietani Busch, Silvia; Bruni, Stefano (eds.). A Companion to Medieval Pisa. Leiden: Brill. pp. 435–455. doi:10.1163/9789004512719_020. ISBN 978-90-04-51271-9.
- Berti, Graziella; Tongiorgi, Liana (1981). I bacini ceramici medievali delle chiese di Pisa (in Italian). Roma: L'Erma di Bretschneider. ISBN 88-7062-523-0.
- Berti, Graziella; Giorgio, Marcella (2011). Ceramiche con coperture vetrificate usate come 'bacini' (in Italian). Borgo San Lorenzo (Firenze): All’Insegna del Giglio. ISBN 978-88-7814-501-6. OCLC 0712597351.
- Mathews, Karen Rose (2022). "Pisan Bacini and the Churches of Pisa". In Mathews, Karen Rose; Orvietani Busch, Silvia; Bruni, Stefano (eds.). A Companion to Medieval Pisa. Leiden: Brill. pp. 456–475. doi:10.1163/9789004512719_021. ISBN 978-90-04-51271-9.
- "Research programme". Immured Vessels in Byzantine and Post-Byzantine Ecclesiastical Monuments of Greece.
- Beliaev, L.A. (2007). ""Бачини": бытовая глазурованная керамика в архитектуре поздневизантийского периода" [Bacini: glazed househould pottery in Late Byzantine architecture]. Rossiyskaya arkheologiya (in Russian). 3: 133–140.
- Ghidoli, A. (1991). "Bacini". Enciclopedia dell' Arte Medievale. Treccani.
- Megaw, Arthur H. S. (1966-01-11). "Glased Bowls in Byzantine Churches". Δελτίον Χριστιανικής Αρχαιολογικής Εταιρείας. 22: 145–162. doi:10.12681/dchae.761. ISSN 2241-2190.
- Yangaki, Anastasia G. (2016). Τhe Immured Vessels in Byzantine and Post-Byzantine Churches of Greece Research Programme: objectives and preliminary results from Crete (PDF). Proceedings of the 12th International Congress of Cretan Studies. Heraklion. ISBN 978-960-9480-35-2.
- Tsouris, Konstantinos (1996). "Glazed bowls in the Late Byzantine churches of North-Western Greece". Archeologia Medievale (XXIII): 603–624. doi:10.1400/245526.
- Ballian, Anna (2023). Bacini Or Immured Plates in Greek Churches (PDF). Athens: Benaki Museum. ISBN 978-960-476-321-4.
