= Islamic influences on Western art =

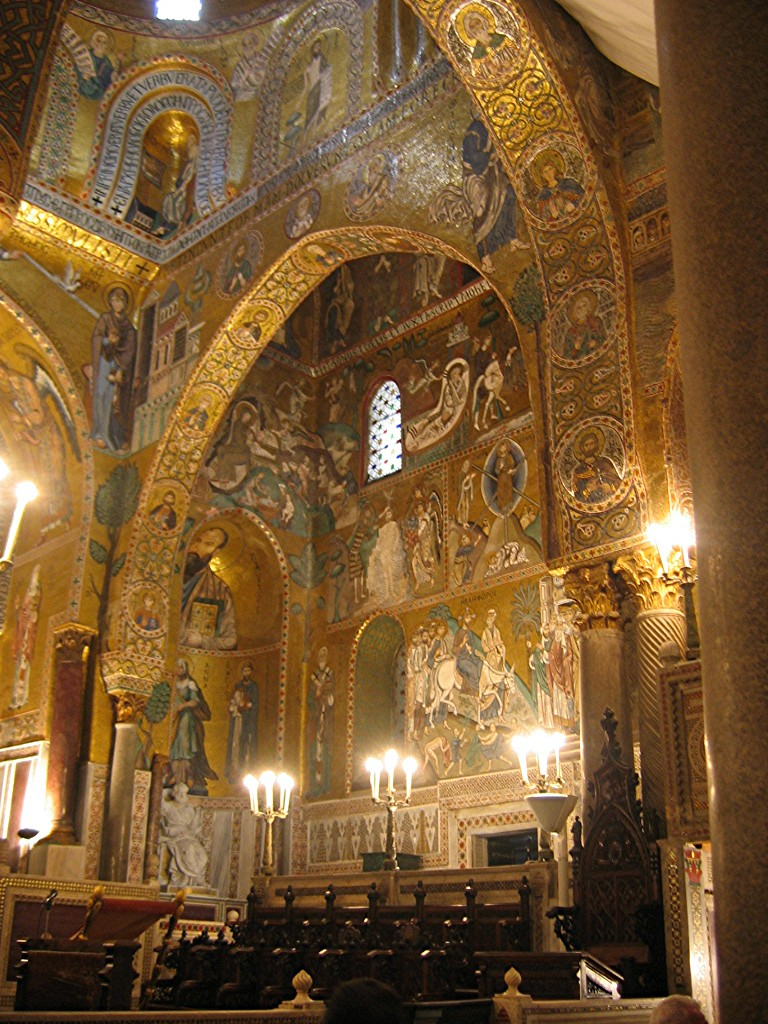
Islamicate pointed arches and Byzantine mosaics complement each other within the Palatine Chapel, Sicily

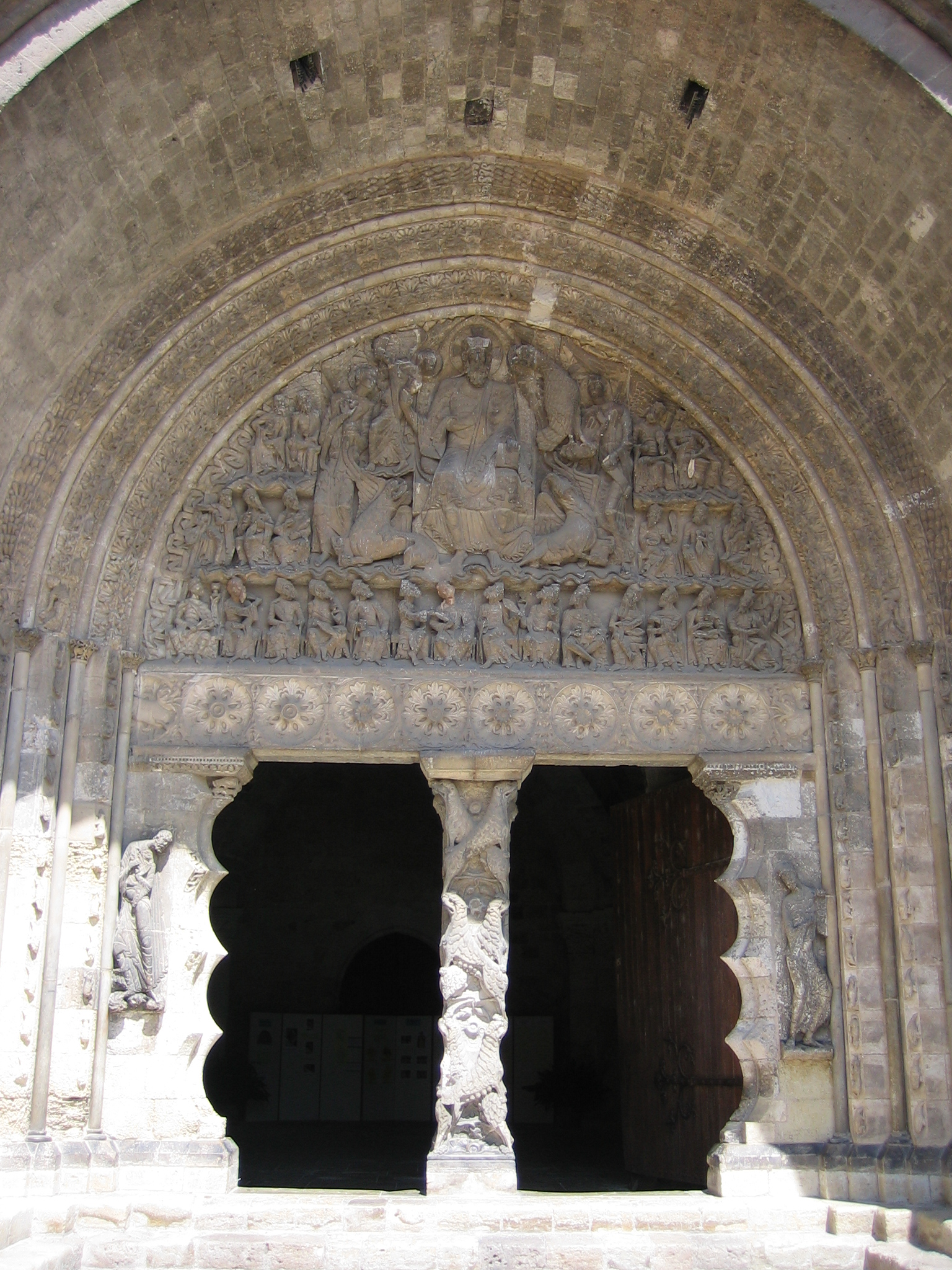
The Romanesque portal at Moissac—see text. Detail of the tympanum here

Islamic influences on Western art refers to the stylistic and formal influence of Islamic art, defined as the artistic production of the territories ruled by Muslims from the 7th century onward, on European Christian art. Western European Christians interacted with Muslims in Europe, Africa, and the Middle East and formed a relationship based on shared ideas and artistic methods. Islamic art includes a wide variety of media including calligraphy, illustrated manuscripts, textiles, ceramics, metalwork, and glass, and because the Islamic world encompassed people of diverse religious backgrounds, artists and craftsmen were not always Muslim. Glass production, for example, remained a Jewish speciality throughout the period. Christian art in Islamic lands, such as that produced in Coptic Egypt or by Armenian communities in Iran, continued to develop under Islamic rulers.

Islamic decorative arts were highly valued imports to Europe throughout the Middle Ages. In the early period, textiles were especially important, due to the labor-intensive nature of their production. These textiles originating in the Islamic world were frequently used for church vestments, shrouds, hangings and clothing for the elite. Islamic pottery of everyday quality was still preferred to European wares.

In the early centuries of Islam, the most important points of contact between the Latin West and the Islamic world from an artistic point of view were Southern Italy, Sicily, and the Iberian peninsula, which both held significant Muslim populations. Later the Italian maritime republics were important in trading artworks. In the Crusades, Islamic art seems to have had relatively little influence even on the Crusader art of the Crusader kingdoms, though it may have stimulated the desire for Islamic imports among Crusaders returning to Europe. Islamic architecture, however, appeared to influence the designs of Templar churches within the Middle East and other cathedrals within Europe upon the return of Crusaders in the 12th and 13th century.

Numerous techniques from Islamic art formed the basis of art in the Norman-Arab-Byzantine culture of Norman Sicily, much of which used Muslim artists and craftsmen working in the style of their own tradition. Techniques included inlays in mosaics or metals, often used for architectural decoration, porphyry or ivory carving to create sculptures or containers, and bronze foundries. In Iberia the Mozarabic art and architecture of the Christian population living under Muslim rule remained very Christian in most ways, but showed Islamic influences in other respects; much what was described as this is now called Repoblación art and architecture. During the late centuries of the Reconquista Christian craftsmen started using Islamic artistic elements in their buildings, as a result the Mudéjar style was developed.

== Middle Ages ==
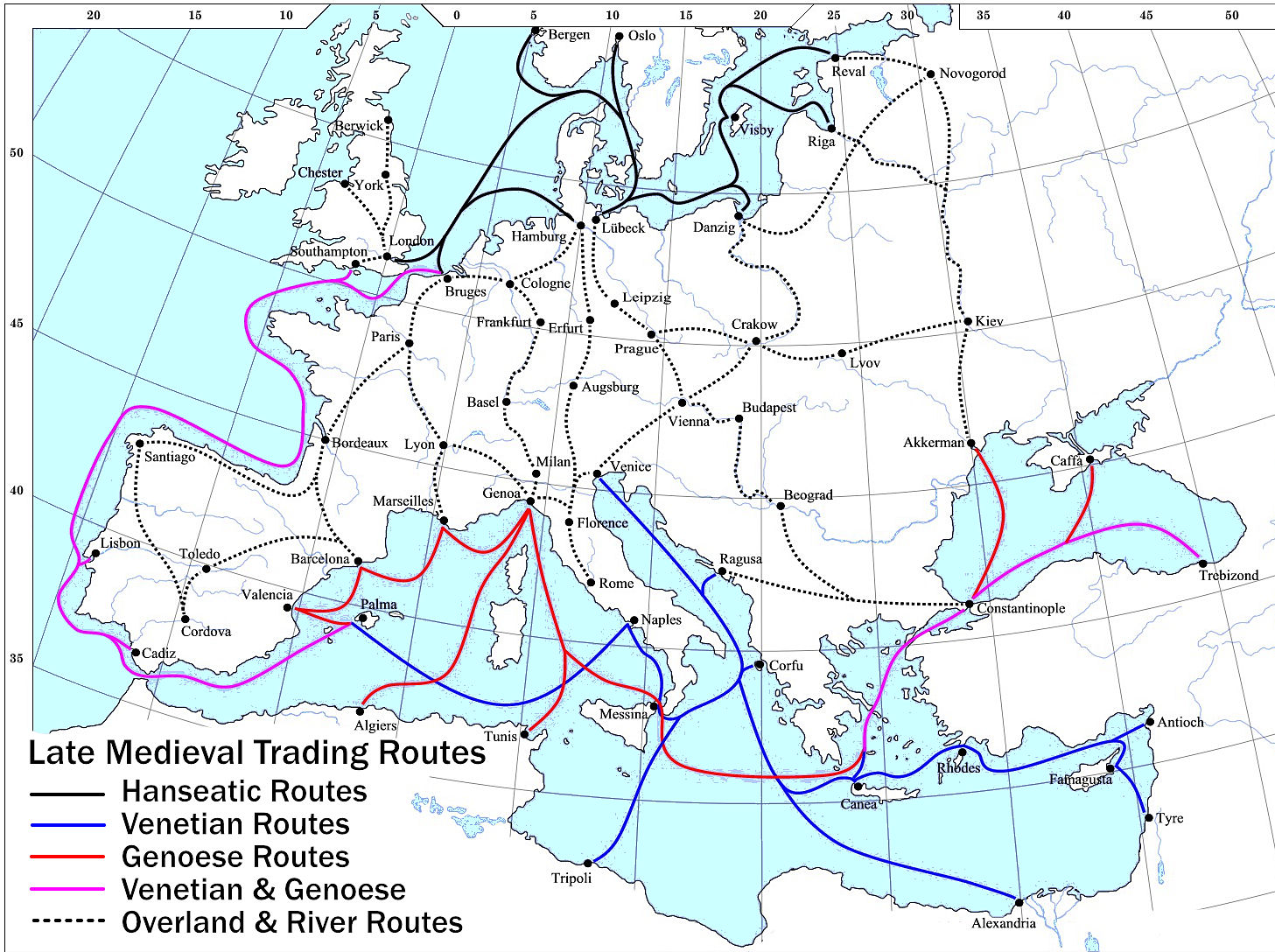
Map showing the main trade routes of late medieval Europe

Islamic art was widely imported and admired by European elites during the Middle Ages. There was an early formative stage from 600-900 and the development of regional styles from 900 onwards. Early Islamic art used mosaic artists and sculptors trained in the Byzantine and Coptic traditions. Instead of wall-paintings, Islamic art used painted tiles, from as early as 862-3 (at the Great Mosque of Kairouan in modern Tunisia), which also spread to Europe. According to John Ruskin, the Doge's Palace in Venice contains "three elements in exactly equal proportions — the Roman, the Lombard, and Arab. It is the central building of the world. ... the history of Gothic architecture is the history of the refinement and spiritualization of Northern work under its influence".

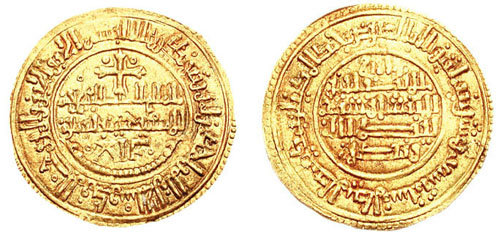
Gold Maravedí issued by Alfonso VIII of Castile in imitation of the Almoravid dinar, 1191. The Arabic text makes Christian professions.

Throughout the Middle Ages, Islamic rulers controlled at various points parts of Southern Italy, the island of Sicily, and most of modern Spain and Portugal, as well as the Balkans, all of which retained large Christian populations. The Christian Crusaders also held territory in regions of the Islamic world, and ruled over some Muslim populations. Crusader art is mainly a hybrid of Catholic and Byzantine styles, showing little Islamic influence; however, the Mozarabic art of Christians in Al Andalus seems to show considerable influence from Islamic art. Islamic influence can also be traced in Romanesque and Gothic art in northern European art. For example, in the Romanesque portal at Moissac in southern France, the scalloped edges to the doorway and the circular decorations on the lintel above, have parallels in Iberian Islamic art. The depiction of Christ in Majesty surrounded by musicians, which was to become a common feature of Western heavenly scenes, may derive from courtly images of Islamic rulers. Calligraphy, ornament, and the decorative arts generally were more important than in the West.

The Hispano-Moresque pottery wares of Spain were first produced in Al-Andalus, but Muslim potters then seem to have emigrated to the area of Christian Valencia. Here they produced work that was exported to Christian elites across Europe; other types of Islamic luxury goods, notably silk textiles and carpets, came from the generally wealthier eastern Islamic world itself (the Islamic conduits to Europe west of the Nile were, however, not wealthier), with many passing through Venice. However, for the most part luxury products of the court culture such as silks, ivory, precious stones and jewels were imported to Europe only in an unfinished form and manufactured into the end product labelled as "eastern" by local medieval artisans. They were free from depictions of religious scenes and normally decorated with ornament, which made them easy to accept in the West, indeed by the late Middle Ages there was a fashion for pseudo-Kufic imitations of Arabic script used decoratively in Western art.

=== Decorative arts ===
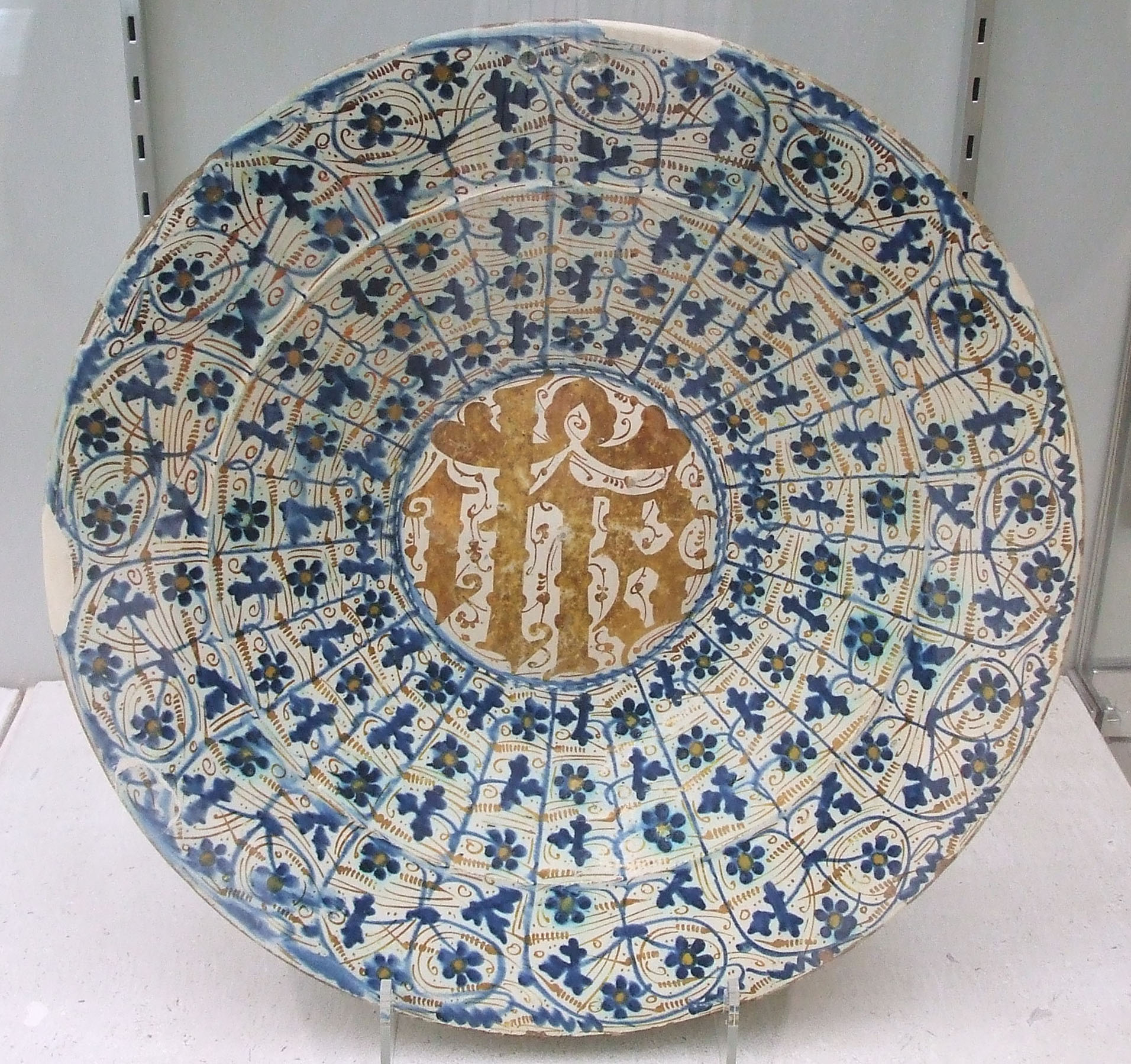
Hispano-Moresque dish, approx 32cm diameter, with Christian monogram "IHS", decorated in cobalt blue and gold lustre, Valencia, c.1430-1500

The historiography of medieval art privileges the study of painting, sculpture, and architecture, in spite of the decorative arts' ubiquity in material culture and popular media. Contributing to this marginalization is the gendering of such objects, which are often labeled feminine.

Until the end of the Middle Ages, many European produced goods could not match the quality of objects originating from areas in the Islamic world or the Byzantine Empire. Because of this, a wide variety of portable objects from various decorative arts were imported from the Islamic world into Europe during the Middle Ages, mostly through Italy, and above all Venice. Venetians visited cities like Damascus, Cairo, and Aleppo throughout the Middle Ages. When they would visit these Muslim centers, they would bring back new ideas for art and architecture. The city of Venice was built with a Christian population in mind, but implemented many classic Islamic elements, and the merchant-city reputation of Venice helped solidify the blend of Islamic and Christian cultures at the time. In many areas European-made goods could not match the quality of Islamic or Byzantine work until near the end of the Middle Ages. Luxury textiles were widely used for clothing and hangings and also, fortunately for art history, also often as shrouds for the burials of important figures, which is how most surviving examples were preserved. In this area Byzantine silk was influenced by Sassanian textiles, and Islamic silk by both, so that is hard to say which culture's textiles had the greatest influence on the Cloth of St Gereon, a large tapestry which is the earliest and most important European imitation of Eastern work. European, especially Italian, cloth gradually caught up with the quality of Eastern imports, and adopted many elements of their designs.

Byzantine pottery was not produced in high-quality types, as the Byzantine elite used silver instead. Islam has many hadithic injunctions against eating off precious metal, and so developed many varieties of fine pottery for the elite, often influenced by the Chinese porcelain wares which had the highest status among the Islamic elites themselves — the Islamic only produced porcelain in the modern period. Much Islamic pottery was imported into Europe, dishes (bacini) even in Islamic Al-Andalus in the 13th century, in Granada and Málaga, where much of the production was already exported to Christian countries. Many of the potters migrated to the area of Valencia, long reconquered by the Christians, and production here outstripped that of Al-Andalus. Styles of decoration gradually became more influenced by Europe, and by the 15th century the Italians were also producing lustrewares, sometimes using Islamic shapes like the albarello. Metalwork forms like the zoomorphic jugs called aquamanile and the bronze mortar were also introduced from the Islamic world.

=== Mudéjar art in Spain ===
Mudéjar art is a style influenced by Islamic art that developed from the 12th century until the 16th century in the Iberia's Christian kingdoms. It is the consequence of the convivencia between the Muslim, Christian and Jewish populations in medieval Spain. The elaborate decoration typical of Mudéjar style fed into the development of the later Plateresque style in Spanish architecture, combining with late Gothic and Early Renaissance elements.

=== Pseudo-Kufic ===
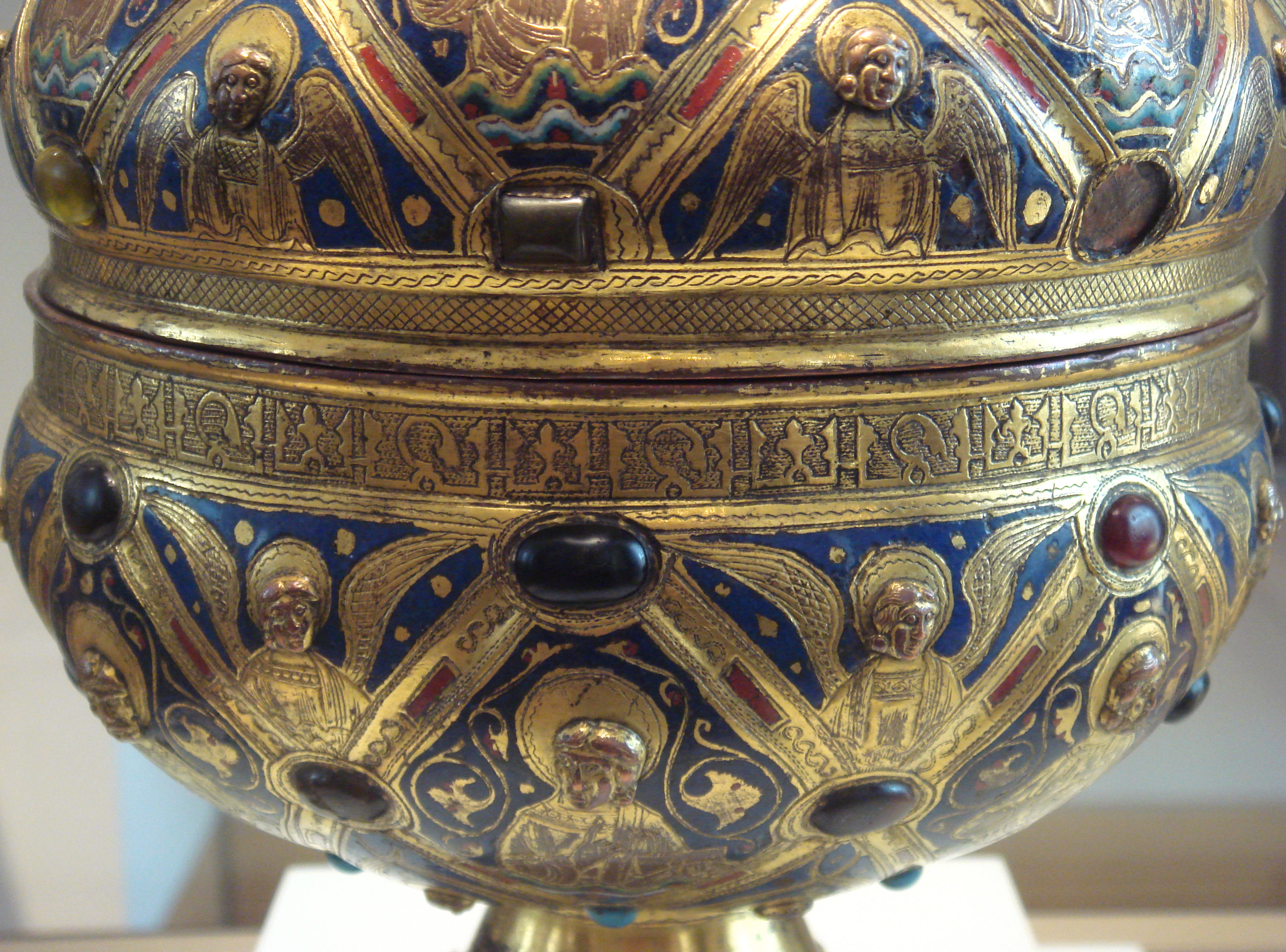
Master Alpais' ciborium, circa 1200 with rim engraved with Arabic script, Limoges, France, 1215-30. Louvre Museum MRR 98

The Arabic Kufic script was often imitated in the West during the Middle-Ages and the Renaissance, to produce what is known as pseudo-Kufic: "Imitations of Arabic in European art are often described as pseudo-Kufic, borrowing the term for an Arabic script that emphasizes straight and angular strokes, and is most commonly used in Islamic architectural decoration". Numerous cases of pseudo-Kufic are known in European religious art from around the 10th to the 15th century. Pseudo-Kufic would be used as writing or as decorative elements in textiles, religious halos or frames. Many are visible in the paintings of Giotto.

Examples are known of the incorporation of Kufic script such as a 13th French Master Alpais' ciborium at the Louvre Museum.

=== Architecture ===
==== Arab-Norman culture in Sicily ====
An example of this blended art style can be seen in the Mantle of Roger II. Designed in Norman Sicily, it went on to be the coronation garb for the Holy Roman Empire. The mantle depicts lions overcoming camels, symbolic imagery to allude to the Norman conquering of Arab territory. This symbol also draws from Islamic cultures' usage of the lion as a symbol of victory at the time, though it flips the context, as it is being used to depict the Norman victory over the Arabs. The inscription on the mantle is also written in Arabic, referencing the culture and language of the lands they overthrew.

The Normans of Sicily were located at a crossroads between European Christian cultures, and the Islamic worlds of Spain, North Africa, Western Asia. Though they were a Christian culture, the lands they ruled over had been previously occupied by Arab Islamic rule until the Normans overtook it in 1060, and their art style reflects this previous Arab leadership and existence at a middle ground in the medieval world.

Christian buildings such as the Cappella Palatina in Palermo, Sicily, incorporated Islamic elements, probably usually created by local Muslim craftsmen working in their own traditions. The ceiling at the Cappella, with its wooden vault arches and gilded figurines, has close parallels with Islamic buildings in Fez and Fustat, and reflect the Muqarnas (stalactite) technique of emphasizing three-dimensional elements

The diaphragm arch, Late Antique in origin, was widely used in Islamic architecture, and may have spread from Spain to France.

==== Islamic Influence on Gothic Architecture ====
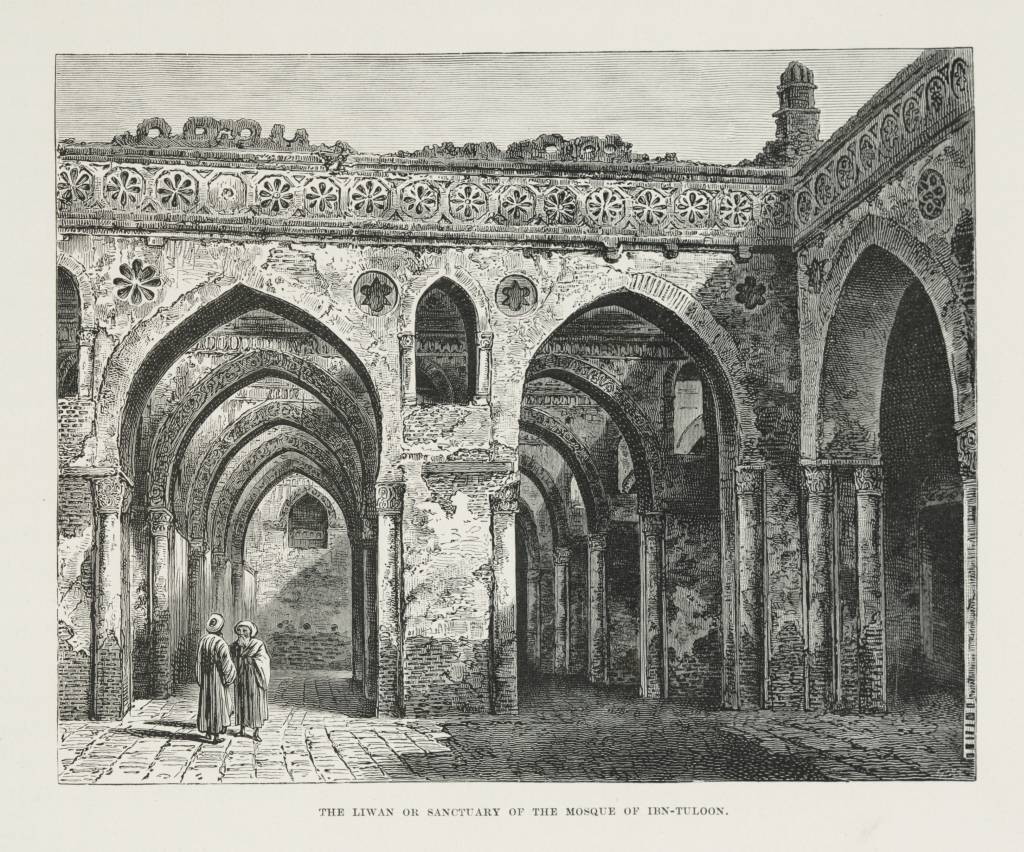
The Liwan or Sanctuary of the Mosque of Ibn-Tuloon (1878) (Note: Ebers, Georg. "Egypt: Descriptive, Historical, and Picturesque." Volume 1. Cassell & Company, Limited: New York, 1878. p 213)

Western scholars of the 18–19th century, who generally preferred Classical art characterized Gothic art as "disorder[ed]”, causing several to draw similarities between Gothic and Islamic architecture. The theory that the Gothic architectural style was influenced by Islamic architecture was made widely known by Sir Christopher Wren in his Parentalia (1750). Wren argued that the pointed arch and ribbed-vaulting characteristics of the Gothic style were borrowed from the Saracens, typically Arab Muslims, therefore Gothic art should be called the “Saracen style” of architecture. William Hamilton commented on the Seljuks monuments in Konya: "The more I saw of this peculiar style, the more I became convinced that the Gothic was derived from it, with a certain mixture of Byzantine (...) the origin of this Gotho-Saracenic style may be traced to the manners and habits of the Saracens" (Note: William J. Hamilton (1842) Researches in Asia Minor, Pontus and Armenia p.206)

The 8th century Umayyad Caliphate within the Iberian peninsula was credited with introducing many elements adopted into Gothic architecture within Spain, and Christian Crusaders returning home to Europe in the 12th and 13th century carried Islamic architectural influences with them into France and later England. Several attributes of Gothic architecture have been biasedly attributed to being borrowed from Islamic styles. The 18th-century English historian Thomas Warton summarized:

"The marks which constitute the character of Gothic or Saracenical architecture, are, its numerous and prominent buttresses, its lofty spires and pinnacles, its large and ramified windows, its ornamental niches or canopies, its sculptured saints, the delicate lace-work of its fretted roofs, and the profusion of ornaments lavished indiscriminately over the whole building: but its peculiar distinguishing characteristics are, the small cluttered pillars and pointed arches, formed by the segments of two interfering circles"

— Thomas Warton Essays on Gothic architecture (Note: Thomas Warton (1802), Essays on Gothic architecture p. 14)

When Sir. Christopher Wren constructed St. Paul’s Cathedral in London, he admitted the use of “Saracen vaulting,” referring to the ribbed-vaulting typical of Islamic mosques, such as in the Great Mosque of Cordoba.

Wren’s attribution of the Gothic’s style’s pointed arch to Islamic architecture was affirmed by 21st century scholar Diana Darke, who in Stealing from the Saracens: How Islamic Architecture Shaped Europe explains that the pointed arch first appeared in the 7th century Dome of the Rock in Jerusalem, which was built by the Umayyad caliph Abd al-Malik. Furthermore, the trefoil arch, which was adopted by Gothic architects to symbolize the Holy Trinity, first appeared within Umayyad shrines and palaces before it was seen in European architecture. Darke’s argument that Western Gothic art was borrowed directly from Islamic art has been criticized for ignoring cross-cultural influences in Islamic art itself, which make it difficult to determine which architectural elements were created by whom in a strictly linear evaluation.

==== Pointed arch ====
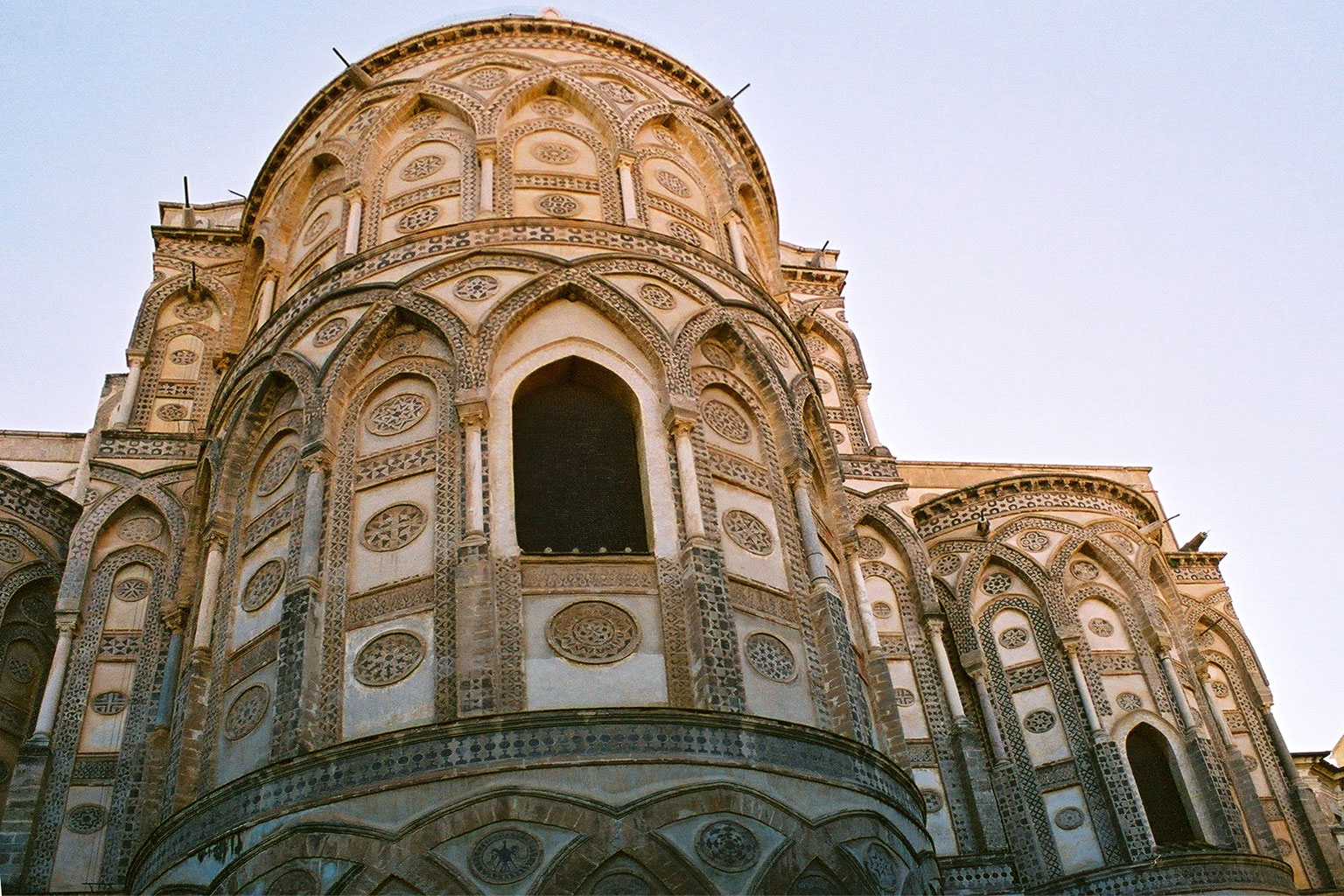
The Romanesque exterior of Monreale Cathedral, Sicily, showing the influence of Islamic architecture

The pointed arch originated in the Byzantine and Sassanian empires, where it mostly appears in early churches in Syria. The Byzantine Karamagara Bridge has curved elliptical arches rising to a pointed keystone. The priority of the Byzantines in its use is also evidenced by slightly pointed examples in Sant'Apollinare in Classe, Ravenna, and the Hagia Irene, Constantinople. The pointed arch was subsequently adopted and widely used by Muslim architects, becoming the characteristic arch of Islamic architecture. According to Bony, it has spread from Islamic lands, possibly through Sicily, then under Islamic rule, and from there to Amalfi in Italy, before the end of the 11th century. The pointed arch reduced architectural thrust by about 20% and therefore had practical advantages over the semi-circular Romanesque arch for the building of large structures.

The pointed arch as a defining characteristic of Gothic architecture appears to have been introduced from the Islamic, in some areas, but to have evolved as a structural solution in late Romanesque, both in England at Durham Cathedral and in the Burgundian Romanesque and Cistercian architecture of France.

==== Templar churches ====
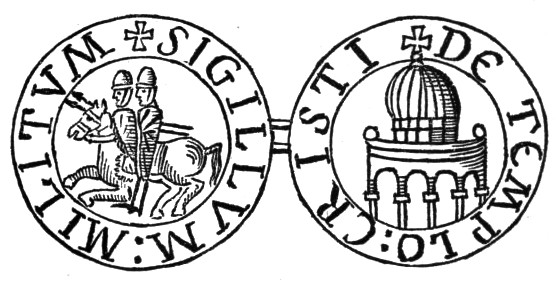
Seal of the Knights Templar featuring a domed building, whether from a dome from Al-Aqsa, the Dome of the Rock or the aedicula of the Church of the Holy Sepulchre

In 1119, the Knights Templar received as headquarters part of the Al-Aqsa Mosque in Jerusalem, considered by the crusaders the Temple of Solomon, from which the order took its common name. Around a decade later, the royal palace moved their headquarters to near the Temple of David, and the Knights Templar took over all of the Al-Aqsa Mosque. Subsequently, the Templar order built secular and religious structures within the mosque’s area, like multiple cloisters, shrines, and a church. It's likely that the Templars used the Dome of the Rock, also known as al-Haram al-Sharif, as a standard to reach in terms of architectural beauty. The typical round churches built by the knights across Western Europe, such as the London Temple Church, may have been influenced by the shape of Al-Aqsa or the Dome of the Rock (known to Muslims as al-Haram al-Sharif), though it's possible they are also referencing the nearby rotunda in the Church of the Holy Sepulchre Both Al-Aqsa and the Holy Sepulchre likely draw influence from Roman mausolea such as the Mausoleum of Augustus, round churches of early Christianity such as Santa Costanza in Rome, and Byzantine interpretations such as Basilica of San Vitale in Ravenna.

== Renaissance ==
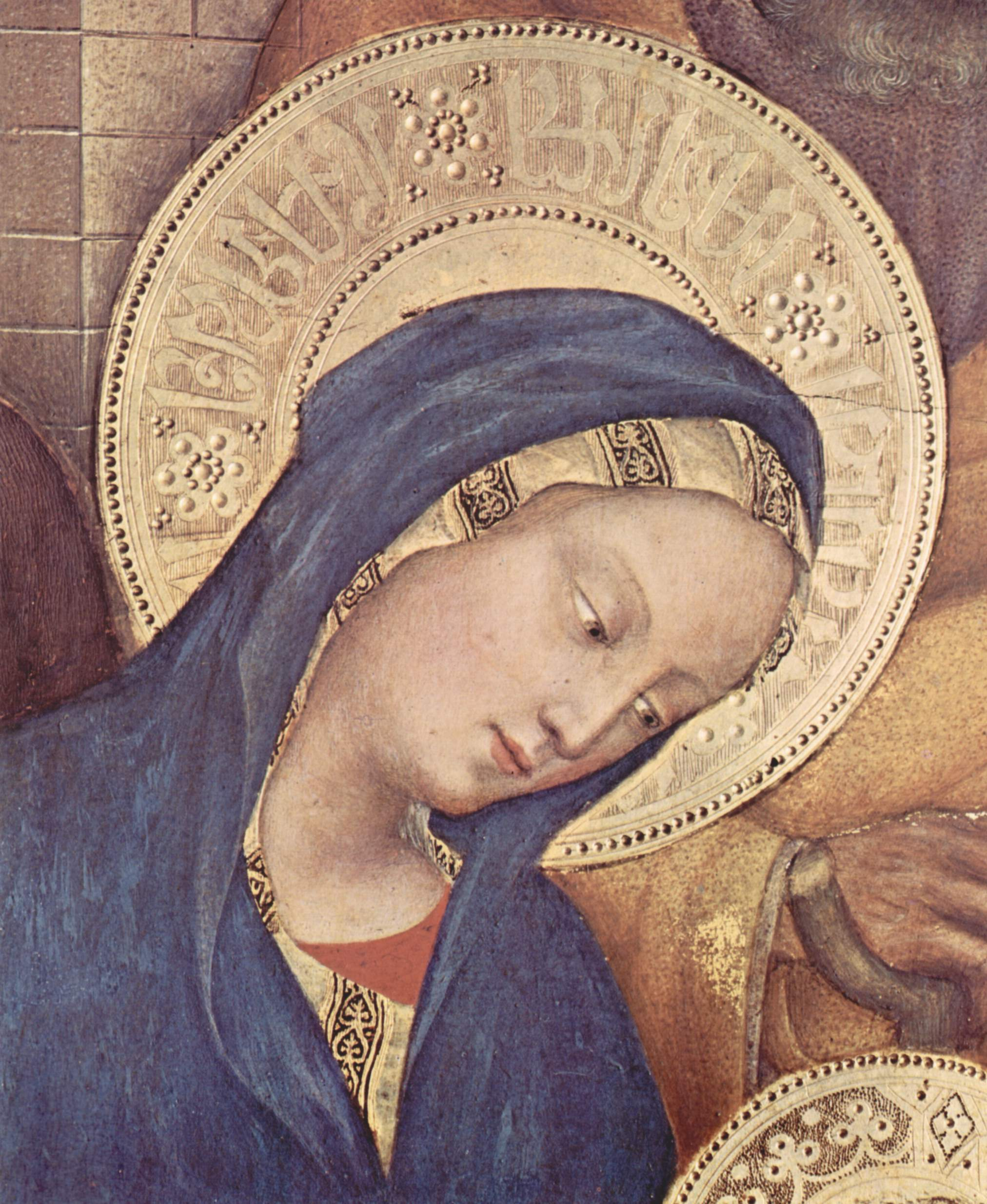
Pseudo-Kufic script in the Virgin Mary's halo, detail of Adoration of the Magi (1423) by Gentile da Fabriano. The script is further divided by rosettes like those on Mamluk dishes.

=== Pseudo-Kufic ===
Pseudo-Kufic is a decorative motif that resembles Kufic script and occurs in many Italian Renaissance paintings. The exact reason for the incorporation of pseudo-Kufic in early Renaissance works is unclear. It seems that Westerners mistakenly associated 13th–14th-century Middle-Eastern scripts as being identical with the scripts current during Jesus's time, and thus found natural to represent early Christians in association with them: "In Renaissance art, pseudo-Kufic script was used to decorate the costumes of Old Testament heroes like David". Mack states another hypothesis:

Perhaps they marked the imagery of a universal faith, an artistic intention consistent with the Church's contemporary international program.

=== Middle Eastern Carpets ===
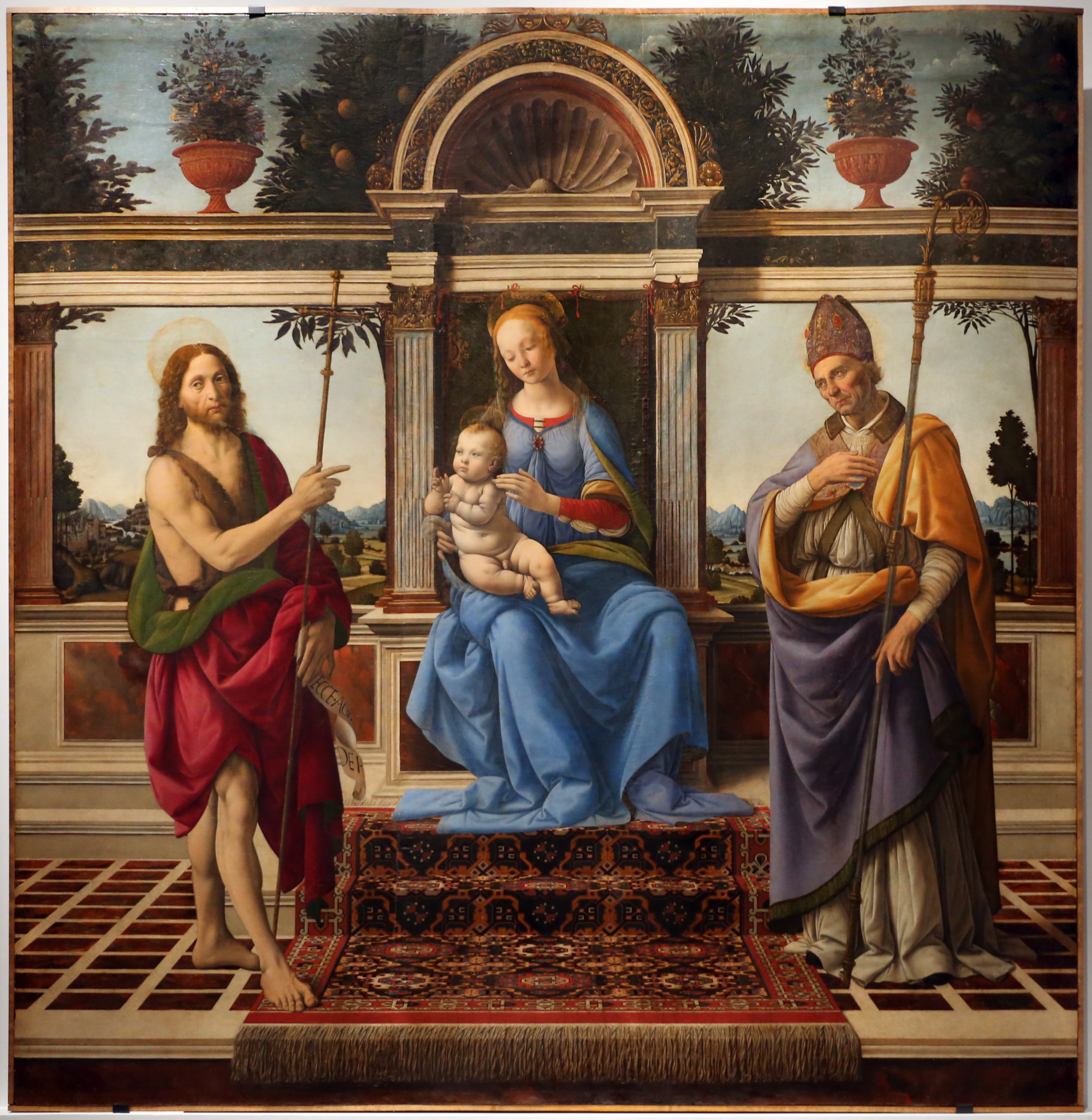
Verrocchio's Madonna with Saint John the Baptist and Donatus 1475-1483 with small-pattern Holbein Islamic carpet at her feet

Carpets of Middle-Eastern origin, either from the Ottoman Empire, the Levant or the Mamluk state of Egypt or Northern Africa, were used as important decorative features in paintings from the 13th century onwards, and especially in religious painting, starting from the medieval period and continuing into the Renaissance period.

Such carpets were often integrated into Christian imagery as symbols of luxury and status of Middle-Eastern origin, and together with Pseudo-Kufic script offer an interesting example of the integration of Eastern elements into European painting.

Anatolian rugs were used in Transylvania as decoration in Evangelical churches.

=== Costumes ===
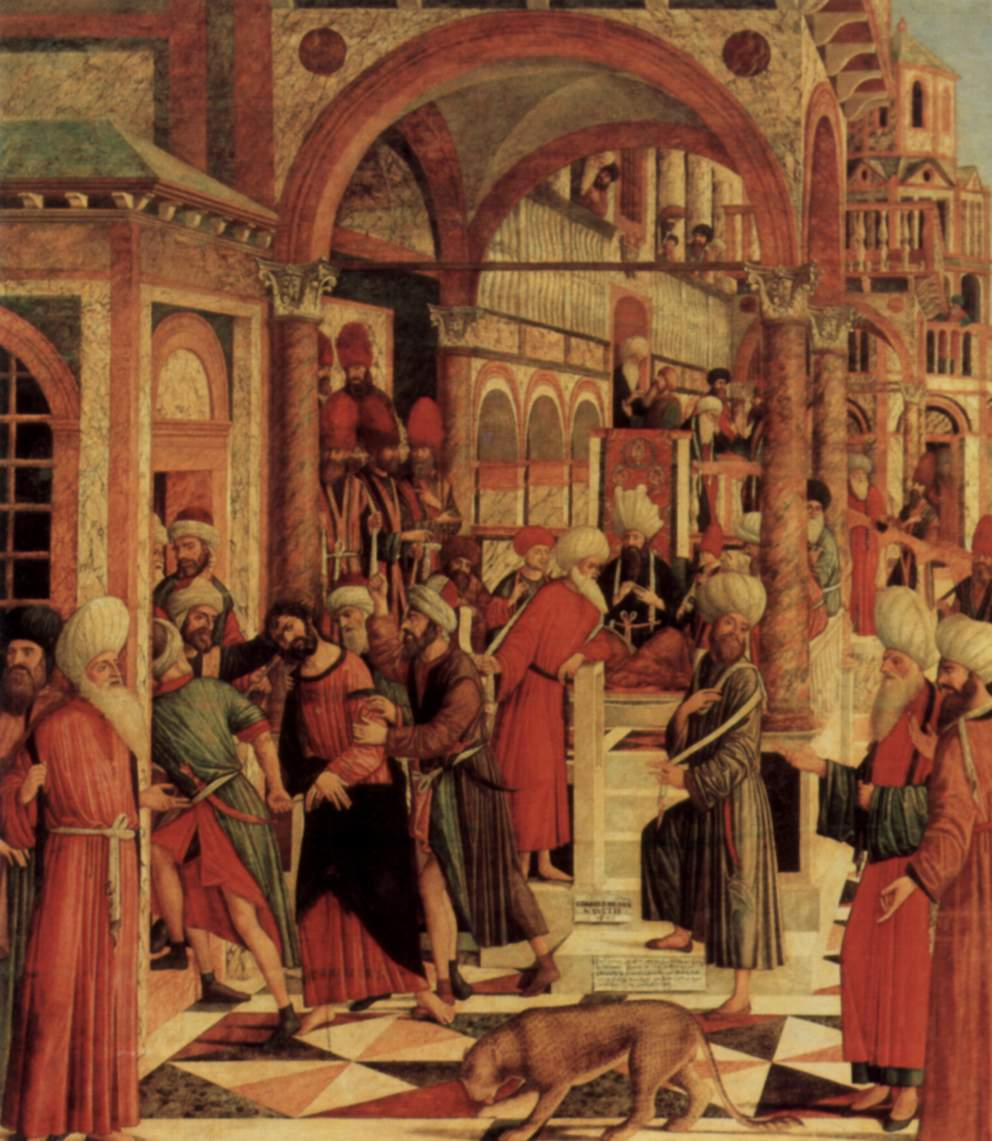
15th-century Mamluks depicted in The Arrest of St. Mark from the Synagogue, Giovanni di Niccolò Mansueti, 1499

Islamic individuals and costumes often provided the contextual backdrop to describe an evangelical scene. This was particularly visible in a set of Venetian paintings in which contemporary Syrian, Palestinian, Egyptian and especially Mamluk personages are employed anachronistically in paintings describing Biblical situations. An example in point is the 15th century The Arrest of St. Mark from the Synagogue by Giovanni di Niccolò Mansueti which accurately describes contemporary (15th century) Alexandrian Mamluks arresting Saint Mark in an historic scene of the 1st century CE. Another case is Gentile Bellini's Saint Mark Preaching in Alexandria.

=== Ornament ===
A Western style of ornament based on the Islamic arabesque developed, beginning in late 15th century Venice; it has been called either moresque or western arabesque. It has been used in a great variety of the decorative arts but has been especially long-lived in book design and bookbinding, where small motifs in this style have continued to be used by conservative book designers up to the present day. It is seen in gold tooling on covers, borders for illustrations, and printer's ornaments for decorating empty spaces on the page. In this field the technique of gold tooling had also arrived in the 15th century from the Islamic world, and indeed much of the leather itself was imported from there.

Like other Renaissance ornament styles it was disseminated by ornament prints which were bought as patterns by craftsmen in a variety of trades. Peter Furhring, a leading specialist in the history of ornament, says that:

The ornament known as moresque in the fifteenth and sixteenth centuries (but now more commonly called arabesque) is characterized by bifurcated scrolls composed of branches forming interlaced foliage patterns. These basic motifs gave rise to numerous variants, for example, where the branches, generally of a linear character, were turned into straps or bands. ... It is characteristic of the moresque, which is essentially a surface ornament, that it is impossible to locate the pattern's beginning or end. ... Originating in the Middle East, they were introduced to continental Europe via Italy and Spain ... Italian examples of this ornament, which was often used for bookbindings and embroidery, are known from as early as the late fifteenth century.

Elaborate book bindings with Islamic designs can be seen in religious paintings. In Andrea Mantegna's Saint John the Baptist and Zeno, Saint John and Zeno hold exquisite books with covers displaying Mamluk-style center-pieces, of a type also used in contemporary Italian book-binding.

== Modern Art ==
=== Jewelry ===
During the early twentieth century, the French jeweler Cartier hosted several exhibitions featuring "Oriental" designs. Inspiring these exhibitions was Jacques Cartier's visit to New Delhi in 1911. Mughal emperors had long admired the jewels of Brazil and Colombia; by the time that Cartier arrived in India, the New Delhi elite had amassed a vast trove of jewelry. In the 1920s, Cartier sought to appeal to the tastes of Indian princes. Clients requested that their jewelry be recast in platinum, prompting the ateliers to hone Mughal styles of jewelry-making. By the 1930s, Cartier began dissembling and reconstructing Indian jewelry. Mughal motifs, as well as cutting and engraving methods, were applied to designs.

The atelier library comprised a robust collection of books on Islamic art. Titles included Émile Prisses d'Avennes' L'Art arabe (1877) and Nikolai Veselovskii's Les Mosquées des Samarcande (1905). While no design initiative towards an Islamic style was explicitly recorded, Louis Cartier's interest in Islamic objects is well-documented. Atelier illustrations from the early twentieth century mimic several motifs from the Maghreb, Iran, and India. Designers cast these motifs under the general titles of "Arab" and "Persian."

Cartier also adopted Islamic motifs within company advertisements. Exhibition materials, for example, were found to mimic early photographs of the Great Mosque of Córdoba, along with sixteenth century Persian manuscripts.

== Influence in North America ==
Moorish architecture appeared in the Americas as early as the arrival of the Spanish led by Christopher Columbus in 1492. Many of the settlers from Spain were craftsmen and builders that converted to Christianity from Islam, bringing "domes, eight-pointed stars, quatrefoil elements, ironwork, courtyard fountains, balconies, towers, and colorful tiles" as noted by historian Phil Pasquini. The oldest building in the United States of America that was influenced by Islamic architecture is the Alamo. One of five missions in the area, it was supposed to include a dome and tower as per Moorish design, but was left in ruins after the battle of the Alamo in 1836.

There are a few popular Islamic influenced tourist attractions in the United States, such as the Morocco pavilion in Disney's Epcot, the Irvine Spectrum Center in Irvine, California, and the Islamic-themed city of Opa-Locka, Florida.

== Methods and Historiography of Islamic Art History ==
=== Origins of an Islamic Art History ===
Western conceptions of Islamic art are informed by the larger discipline of art history. Only recently has a specially Islamic art history emerged as a field of study. It was 1893 when the Palais de l’Industrie dedicated an exhibition to “Muslim art.” The exhibition marked an important shift in the academic lexicon. No longer was it fashionable to label the art of the Mashriq “Arab,” or “Saracen”; rather, the European historian sought to categorize these forms through a particular religious context. “Muslim art” thus materialized as a specialized subject, rather than a nebulous expression of the Orient. In 1910, the exhibit Masterpieces of Mohammedan Art in Munich showcased 3,553 pieces of Islamic art. This exhibition sought to elucidate a history of the Islamic world, deeming its many objects masterpieces while emphasizing the "threat" of the Orient. As museums sought to define a specially Islamic art form, academia also took interest. Between 1904 and 1905, historian Gaston Migeon taught a “muslim art” course at the École du Louvre. Paris soon emerged as the nucleus of the Islamic art market.

The Islamic art histories of the nineteenth and twentieth centuries share historiographical tropes. Commanding the field were several premises: that Islam made homogenous a specially Islamic aesthetic; that texts could be used to extract meaning from symbols across manifold regions and cultures; and that Quranic objects shared the same purpose as other Abrahamic icons. According to Finbarr Barry Flood—Founder of NYU’s Center for Material Histories—and Gülru Necipoğlu—Director of Harvard’s Aga Khan Program for Islamic Architecture—scholarship went so far as to cement the notion that the Islamic world was removed from modernity. During the 1860s, the German term Bilderverbot emerged to characterize a supposedly iconoclastic attitude among Muslim artists. It was assumed that a commitment to ornament and rejection of figural imagery was indicative of the Islamic world’s primitive mindset. Such theories bolstered narratives of Eurocentrism, and suggested that racial categories could be perceived in art. The authors consider, too, that early histories may have been forged by ill-equipped critics. During the mid-twentieth century, historians Richard Ettinghausen and Oleg Grabar noted Western scholars’ inability to perform both textual and visual analysis on Islamic objects.

=== Contemporary Innovations ===
Recent scholarship has cast light on the frameworks through which Islamic art histories are constructed. Columbia Professor Avinoam Shalem—author of Islam Christianized (1998) and Facing the Wall: The Palestinian-Israeli Barriers (2011)—attributes this phenomenon to the theories of Edward Said. In 2003, Said died, renewing interest in his acclaimed treatise, Orientalism. Probing the West’s fetishization of Eastern cultures, Orientalism casts light on the historical aestheticization of an Occident-Orient binary. Spearheaded by European elites, this binary aims to subjugate the colonized entity: the East is perceived as submissive, infantile; whereas the West is hailed as dominant, mature.

Shalem contends that Said’s observation should serve as a guidepost for all scholars of art history. In his essay “What Do We Mean When We Say ‘Islamic Art?’” (2012), he calls for the reappraisal of traditional art historical methods—an approach to Islamic art and art production that questions Western assumptions. Embracing a postcolonial dialectic, this approach, Shalem argues, invites more holistic interpretations of Islamic art. Dominant, Western methodologies privilege “the center” over “the periphery,” framing culture as a force projecting outward from an urban nucleus. What this approach overlooks is the art of “the periphery”—or rather, objects produced beyond the cities of the fertile crescent. Echoing Shalem, art historians Finbarr Barry Flood and Gülru Necipoğlu observe that scholarship privileges the “central Islamic lands” marginalizing regions like the “Islamic West (Maghrib), Sub-Saharan Africa, and East and Southeast Asia." Shalem suggests that, in perpetuating this trope, scholars risk forging less-than-holistic histories of Islamic art. Exemplifying this is the “seldom acknowledged” presence of Fatimid styles in Norman Sicily, an island. Shalem contends that if the historian means to disrupt the binary between Occident and Orient—“Us and Other”—it is essential that they offer the art of “the periphery” due-consideration.

Recent scholarship has also criticized the solitary character of the field, calling for greater collaboration among scholars. In A Companion to Islamic Art and Architecture (2017), Flood and Necipoğlu hail their project a “landmark collaborative enterprise” designed to innovate the tired survey text. This is echoed not only in the book’s co-authorship, but in its vision for a different Islamic art historiography. The authors broach compelling reasons for interdisciplinary collaboration: Because the material cultures of the medieval and post-medieval periods are so hybrid in character, it is essential that researchers’ harness a wide variety of skills. These include proficiency in Turkish and Persian; as well as familiarity with the region’s literary, philosophical, scientific, and legislative traditions. Such diversity, the authors contend, necessitates sustained collaboration between scholars of Islamic texts and aesthetics. It is noted, too, that a general lack of funding toward humanities research may hasten this effort.

Flood and Necipoğlu also call for the expansion of scholars’ research focus; or rather, their daring. Condemning the ceaseless “recycling” of canonical subjects, they avow that:

Rather than challenging the canon, or expanding its reach, such circumscription tends to reinforce the status quo, reducing the history of Islamic art to objects and texts most accessible (to mainly European and American) scholars.

This "circumscription" materializes most literally in the dismissal of modern and contemporary objects from survey texts. Rarely do studies include works from the nineteenth century onwards—effectively confining Islamic art to the past. The second volume of Flood’s and Necipoğlu’s Companion is thusly titled “From the Mongols to Modernism,” and includes two chapters on modern and contemporary Islamic art.

== See also ==
- Islamic influence on medieval Europe

== Notes and references ==
=== References ===
- Aubé, Pierre (2006). Les empires normands d'Orient (in French). Editions Perrin. ISBN 2-262-02297-6.
- Beckwith, John (1994) [1964], Early Medieval Art: Carolingian, Ottonian, Romanesque, Thames & Hudson, ISBN 0-500-20019-X
- Bony, Jean (1985). French Gothic Architecture of the Twelfth and Thirteenth Centuries. California studies in the history of art. University of California Press. ISBN 978-0-520-05586-5.
- Fuhring, Peter (1994). "Renaissance Ornament Prints; The French Contribution". In Jacobson, Karen (ed.). The French Renaissance in prints from the Bibliothèque Nationale de France. (often wrongly cat. as George Baselitz). Grunwald Center, UCLA. ISBN 0-9628162-2-1.
- Grabar, Oleg (2006). Islamic visual culture, 1100 - 1800. Constructing the study of Islamic art. Vol. 2. Aldershot: Ashgate. ISBN 978-0-86078-922-2.
- Harthan, John P. (1961). Bookbinding (2nd rev. ed.). HMSO (for the Victoria and Albert Museum). OCLC 220550025.
- Hoffman, Eva R. (2007): Pathways of Portability: Islamic and Christian Interchange from the Tenth to the Twelfth Century, in: Hoffman, Eva R. (ed.): Late Antique and Medieval Art of the Mediterranean World, Blackwell Publishing, ISBN 978-1-4051-2071-5
- Honour, Hugh; Fleming, John (1982), "Honour", A World History of Art, London: Macmillan
- Jones, Dalu; Michell, George, eds. (1976). The Arts of Islam. Arts Council of Great Britain. ISBN 0-7287-0081-6.
- Kleiner, Fred S. (2008). Gardner's art through the ages: the western perspective (13, revised ed.). Cengage Learning. ISBN 978-0-495-57355-5.
- Kleinhenz, Christopher; Barker, John W (2004). Medieval Italy : an encyclopedia, Volume 2. Routledge. ISBN 978-0-415-93931-7.
- La Niece, Susan; McLeod, Bet; Rohrs, Stefan (2010). The Heritage of "Maitre Alpais": An International and Interdisciplinary Examination of Medieval Limoges Enamel and Associated Objects. British Museum Research Publication. ISBN 978-0-86159-182-4.
- Mack, Rosamond E. (2001). Bazaar to Piazza: Islamic Trade and Italian Art, 1300-1600. University of California Press. ISBN 0-520-22131-1.
- Schiffer, Reinhold (1999). Oriental panorama: British travellers in 19th century Turkey. Rodopi. ISBN 978-90-420-0407-8.
