= Bona of Pisa =

Italian Roman Catholic saint

Saint Bona of Pisa
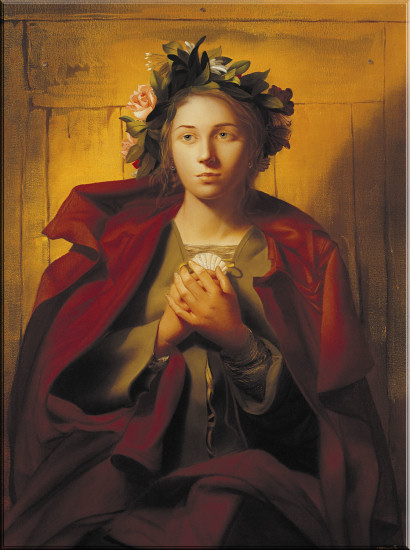
- Santa Bona, Giovanni Lorenzetti Fusari, 2003

Virgin
- Born: c. 1156; Pisa, Italy
- Died: c. 1207; Pisa, Italy
- Venerated in: Roman Catholic Church
- Feast: 29 May
- Patronage: Travellers: specifically couriers, guides, pilgrims, flight attendants; Pisa

Bona of Pisa (c. 1156–1207) was a member of the Third order of the Augustinian nuns who helped lead travellers on pilgrimages. In 1962, she was canonized a saint in the Catholic Church by Pope John XXIII. She is considered the patron saint of travellers, and specifically couriers, guides, pilgrims, flight attendants, and the city of Pisa.

== Biography ==
A native of Pisa, she was born in the parish of San Martino in Guazzolongo. Her mother, Berta, was Corsican; her father, named Bernardo, was a Pisan merchant. When she was three years old, her father left and never returned, leaving his family in difficult straits.

By the age of ten, she had dedicated herself as an Augustinian tertiary. Four years later, she made the first of her many journeys, going to see her father who was a Crusader near Jerusalem. On her trip home with some of her traveling companions, she was captured by Muslim pirates on the Mediterranean Sea, wounded, and subsequently imprisoned.

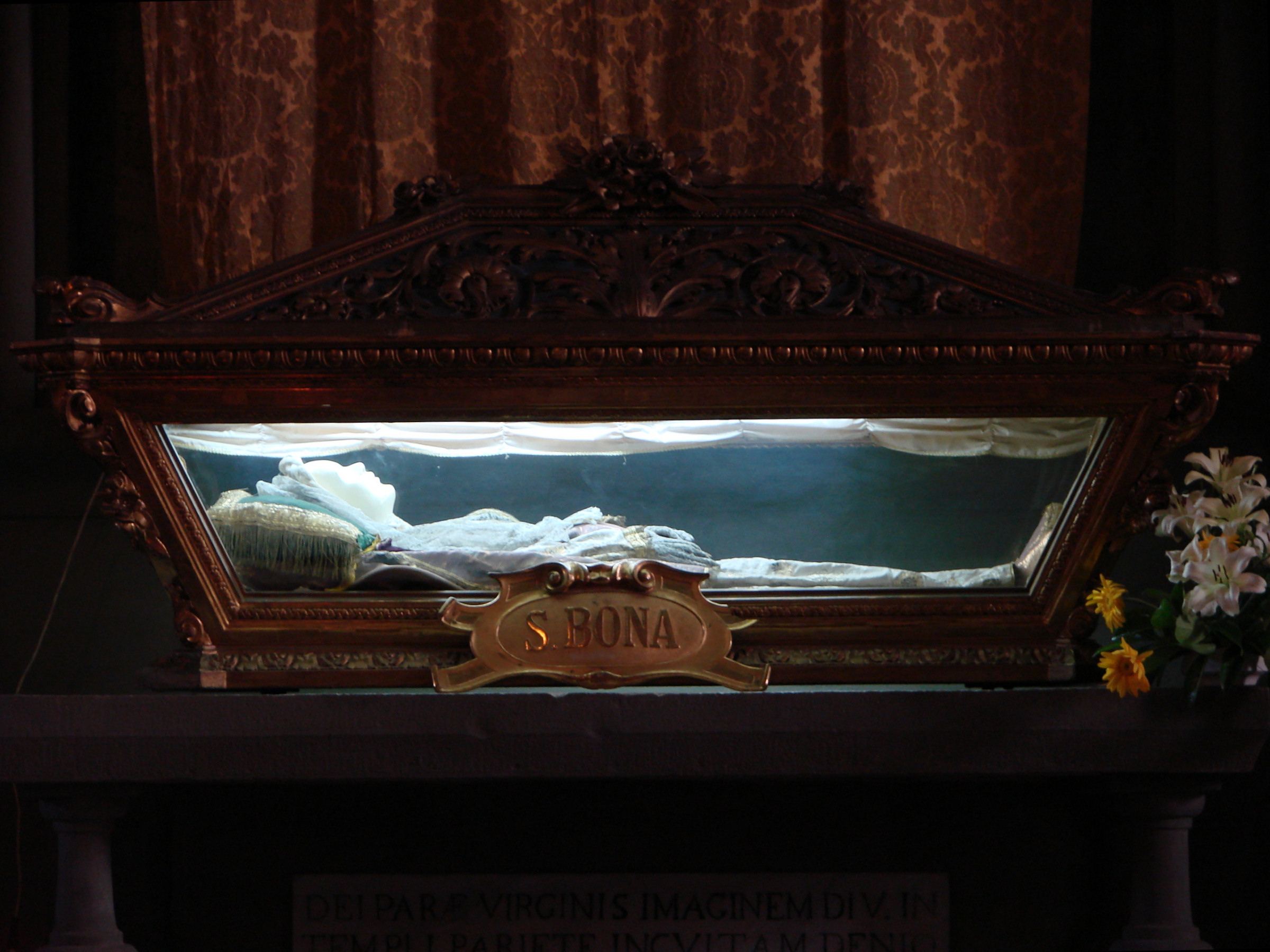
Remains of Santa Bona, in Church of San Martino, Pisa

She was later ransomed by some of her countrymen, and completed her trip home. Shortly thereafter, she set out on another pilgrimage, this time with a large number of pilgrims on the long and dangerous journey to Santiago de Compostela, where James the Greater is honored. Along the way, she helped with the difficulties, encouraged those sometimes discouraged, provided medical aid and invited all to prayer and penance. After this, she was made one of the official guides along this pilgrimage route by the Knights of Saint James. She successfully completed the trip nine times. She also made pilgrimages to Rome and to the shrine of the Monte Sant'Angelo sul Gargano.

Despite being ill at the time, she attempted a tenth trip, but returned home to Pisa, dying shortly thereafter in the room she kept near the Church of San Martino, where her body has been preserved to the present day.

== Legends ==
On one occasion, when she was seven, the figure on the crucifix at the Holy Sepulchre church held out his hand to her. Later, at another church, she saw a vision of Jesus, the Virgin Mary, and three saints, including James the Greater. She was frightened by the light around these figures, and ran away. James followed her, and led her back to the image of Jesus. Bona observed a very pronounced devotion to James for the rest of her life.

== Veneration ==
Roman Martyrology: "In Pisa, Saint Bona, virgin, who made frequent pilgrimages with devotion to the Holy Land, to Rome and to Compostela."

Her cult was local, limited to the diocese of Pisa. She is depicted as a nun with a cross or a pilgrim's staff. Her feast day is celebrated on 29 May. In 1962, Pope John XXIII named her the patron saint of Italian tour guides, guides and flight attendants.

She is also regarded as a patron saint of the city of Pisa.

== See also ==
- Godric of Finchale

== Sources ==
- Attwater, Donald and Catherine Rachel John. The Penguin Dictionary of Saints. 3rd edition. New York: Penguin Books, 1993. ISBN 0-14-051312-4.
- Saint Bona of Pisa at Patron Saints Index
- Bona of Pisa at Saints - May
