= San Sisto, Pisa =

Church in Pisa, Italy

Coordinates: 43°43′10.23″N 10°23′55.98″E

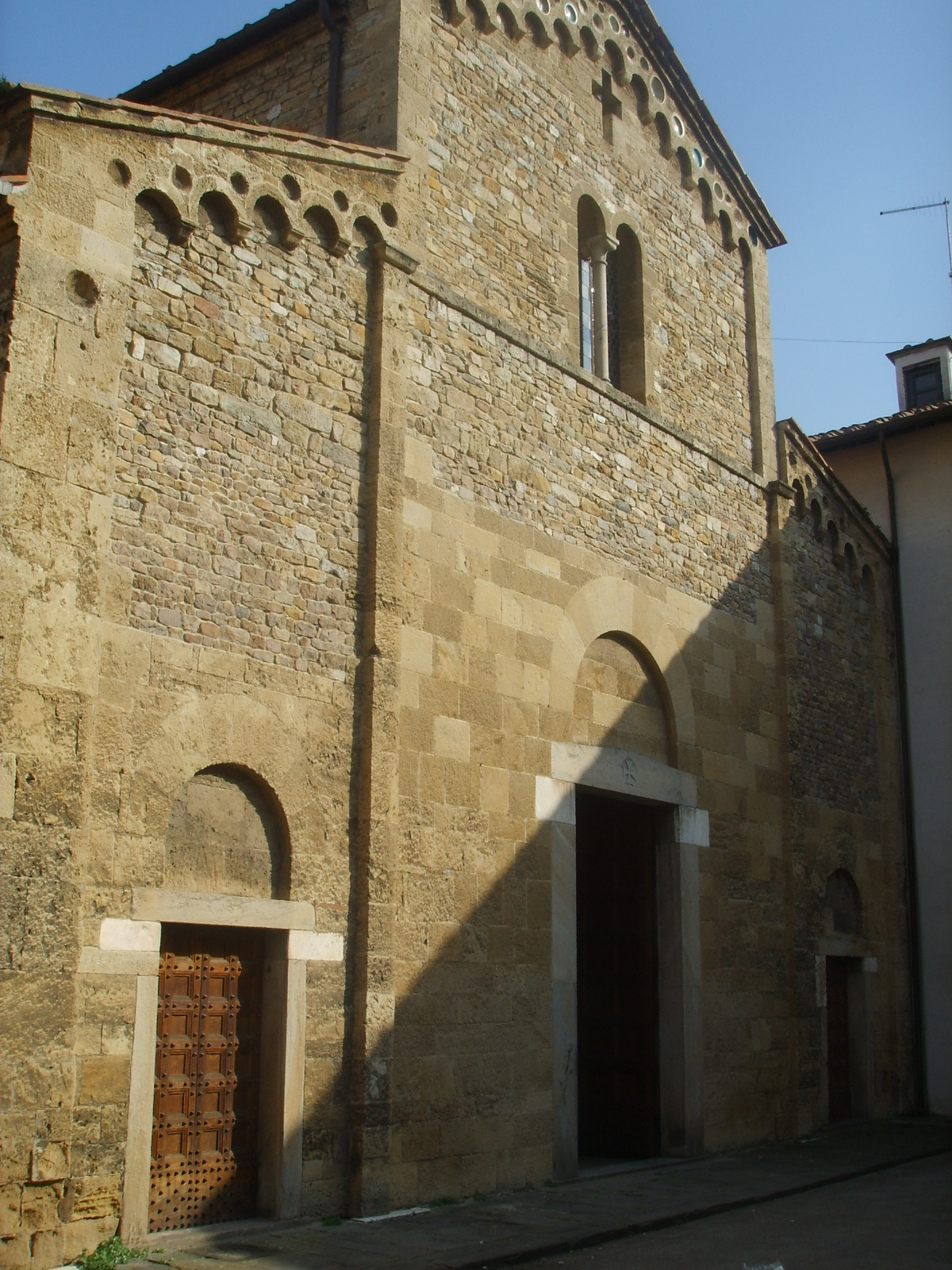
Façade of San Sisto

San Sisto is a church in Pisa, Tuscany, Italy.

It was consecrated in 1133 but previously it had been already used as the seat of the most important notary act of the Pisan commune. It was built in a Pisane-Romanesque style in stone. The façade is divided in three parts divided by pilaster strips, with a mullioned window and arches in the upper part which continues on the whole exterior. Notable is the typical local decoration with Islamic ceramic basins (bacini) from the 10th-11th centuries (copies; the original are in the Museum of St. Matthew in the city).

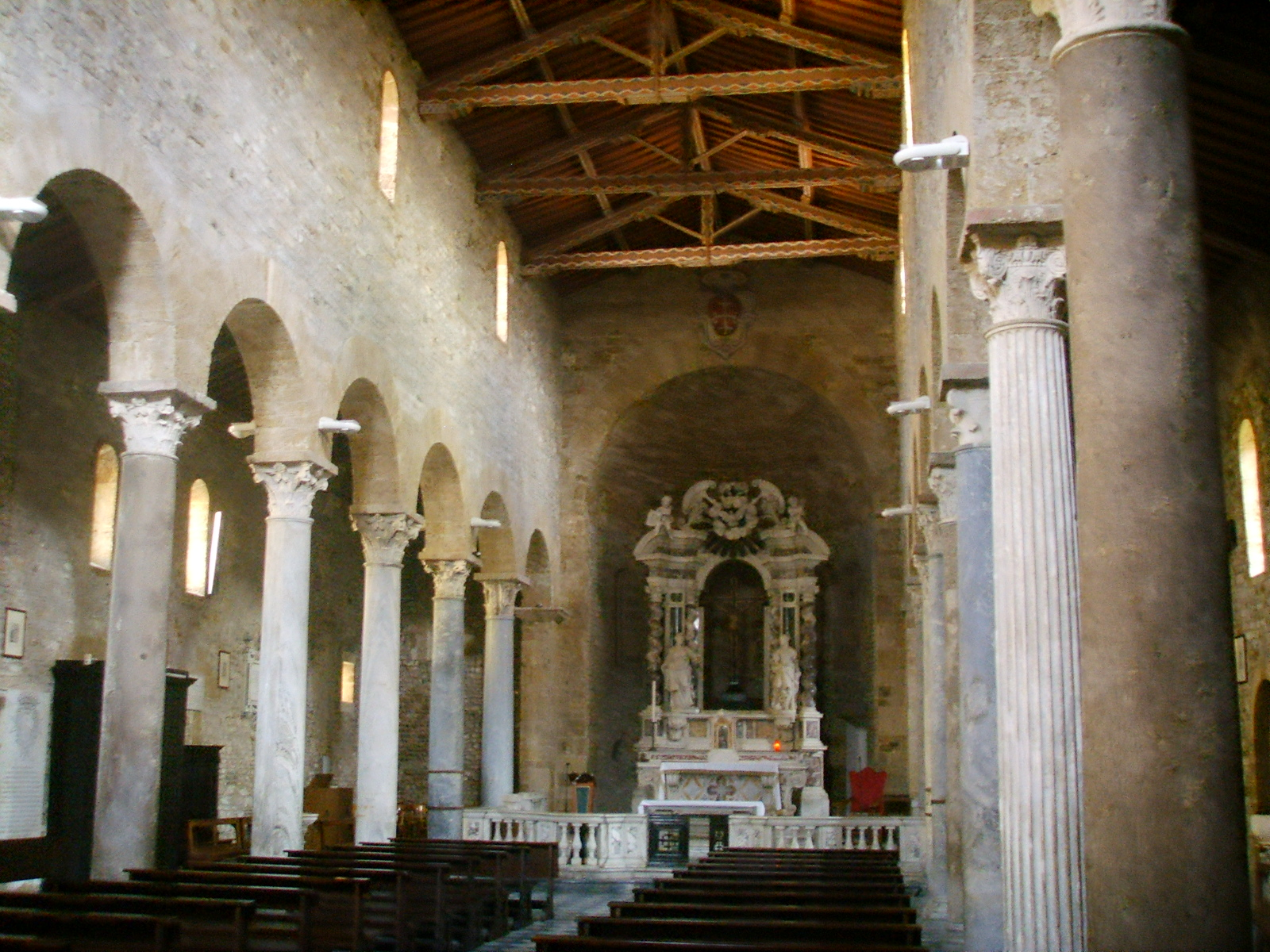
Interior

The interior has a nave and two aisles, divided by columns with ancient Roman capitals, with hut-shaped ceiling. It houses also an Arabic tombstone, the copy of a 14th-century Madonna with Child and the rudder of a Pisane galley (13th-14th centuries).
