= Ugolino di Tedice =

Italian painter

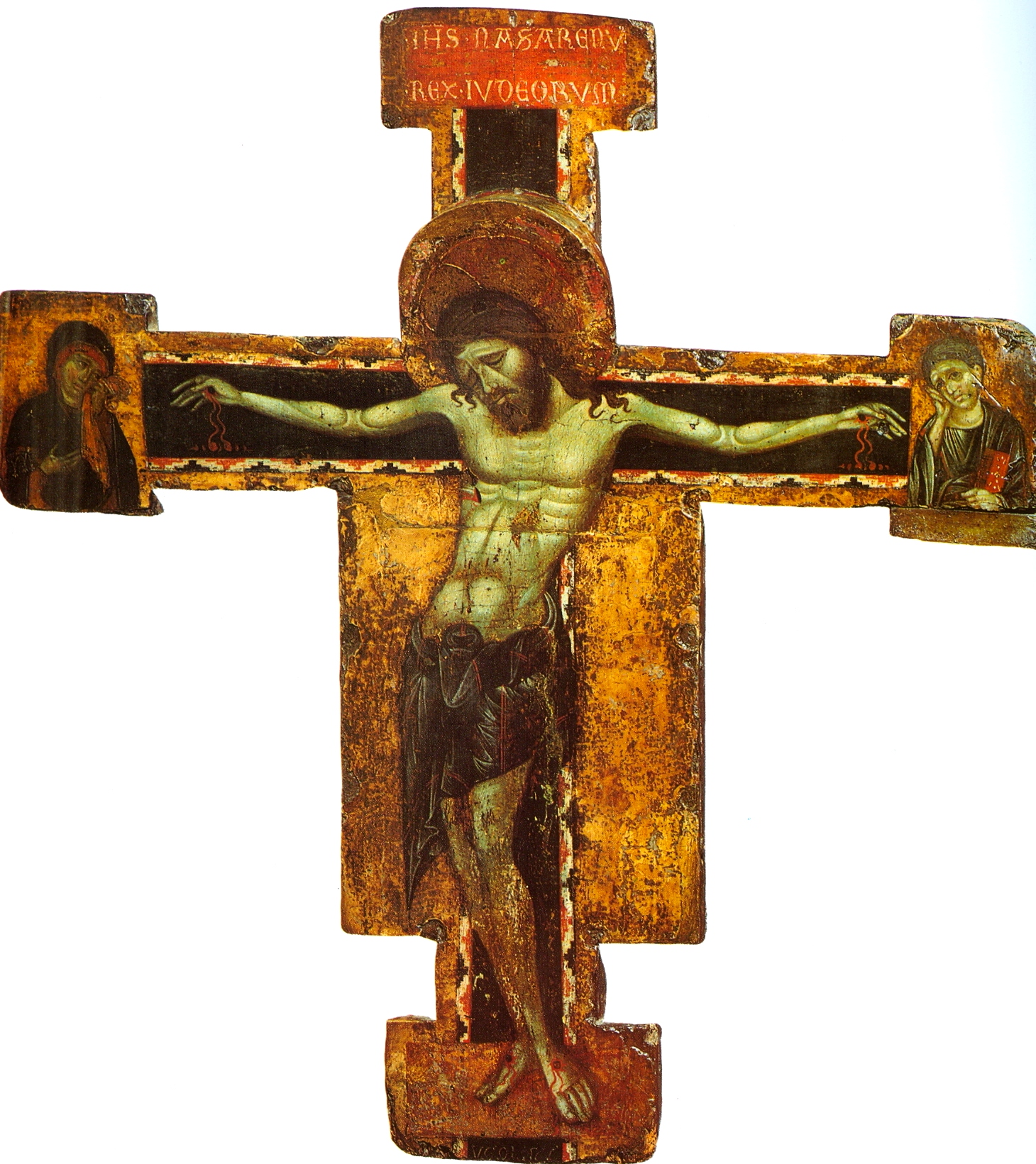
Crucifix in the Hermitage Museum

Ugolino di Tedice (died after 1277), was an Italian painter and the brother of Enrico di Tedice.

== Biography ==
He is documented as coming to Pisa in 1273 and 1277 and is known for religious works. He is considered to be the brother of Enrico because they both worked in Pisa. Some sources claim they are the same person.
