= San Martino, Pisa =

Church in Pisa, Tuscany, Italy

Coordinates: 43°42′45.91″N 10°24′15.96″E

Church of San Martino
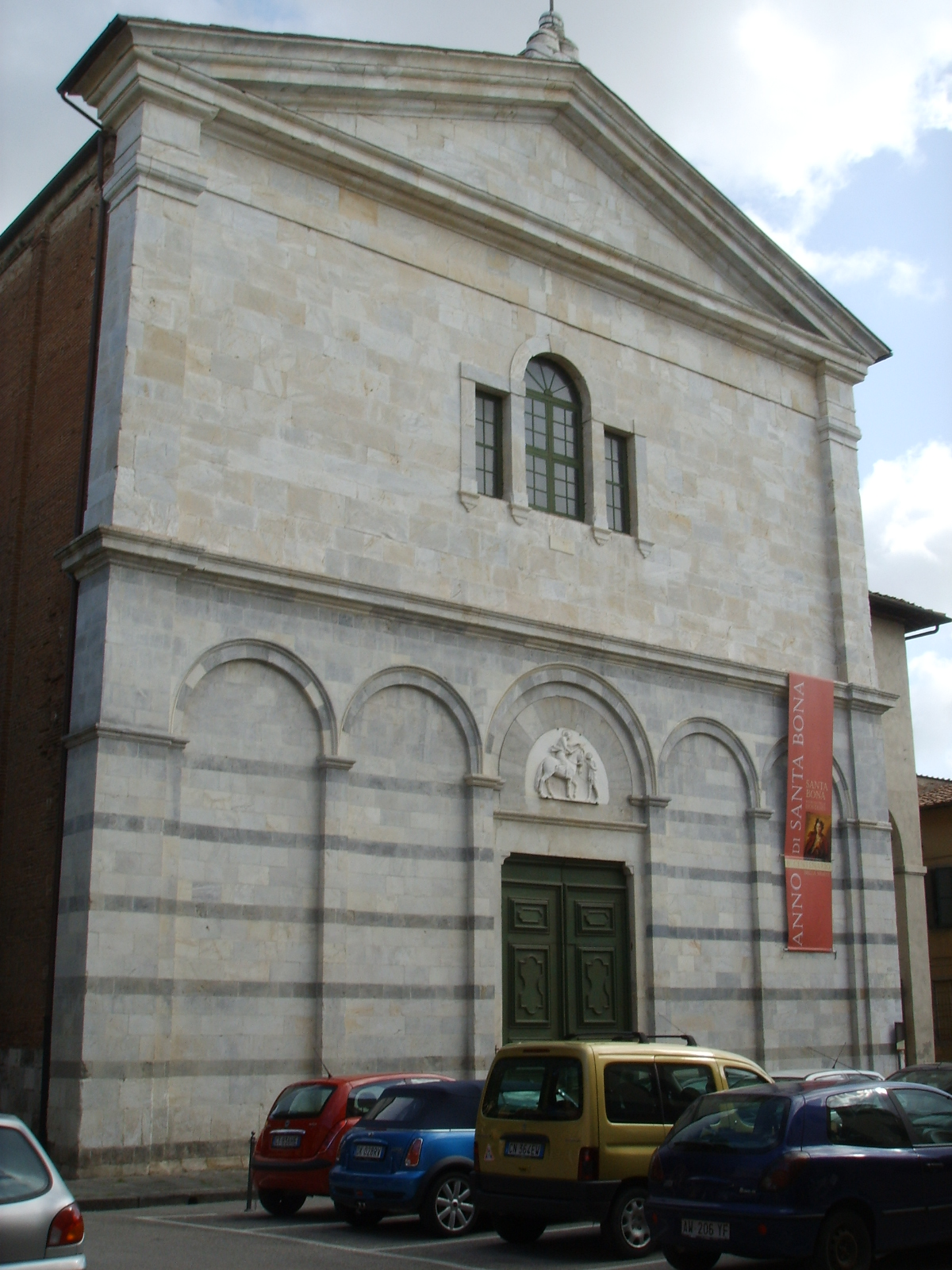

Religion
- Affiliation: Roman Catholic
- Province: Pisa

Location
- Location: Pisa, Italy
- Interactive map of Church of San Martino

Architecture
- Type: Church
- Groundbreaking: 1331
- Completed: 1610

San Martino is a Roman Catholic church in Pisa, region of Tuscany, Italy, facing piazza San Martino, on the left bank of the Arno river.

== History ==
Documents from 1067 cite a church of "San Martino in Guazzolongo" (name of the quartiere), belonging to the Augustinian order. It was rebuilt in 1331, under the commission of Bonifacio Novello della Gherardesca, who wished to endow nuns of an Order of Saint Clare a convent. From 1395, it was considered "cappella del Santissimo Sacramento". The lower façade dates from this epoch, while the superior portion was not completed until 1610.

== Description ==
The rectangular shape is typical of Franciscan order churches of its time, such as the contemporary churches of San Francesco and Santa Caterina. The remains of a bell-tower are visible. The polychrome ceramic baptismpal font is now found in the Museo Nazionale di San Matteo. The Marble facade has a copy of the bas relief of San Martino and the poor man attributed to Andrea Pisano; the original is kept inside.

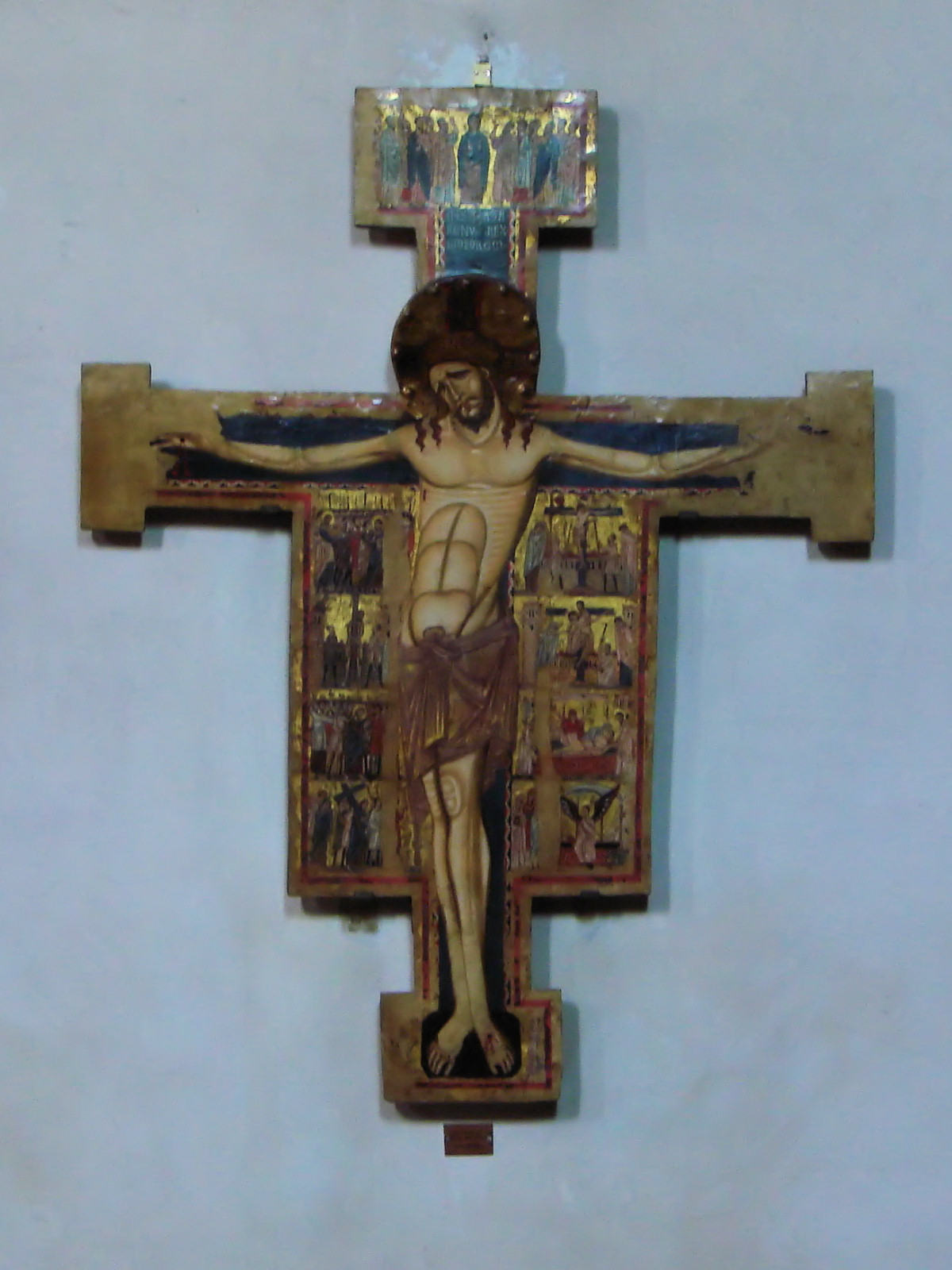
Crucifix by Enrico di Tedice.

The interior, reconstructed in the 17th century conserves a painted wooden Crucifix by the 13th-century Pisan painter Enrico di Tedice; in the ceiling of the chapel of the Holy Sacrament, there are 14th-century frescoes depicting Redeemer and Saints by Giovanni di Nicola and Cecco di Pietro . On the wall are stories of the virgin by Antonio Veneziano.

The altars contain a number of prominent works of 17th century painters including Palma il Giovane, Orazio Riminaldi, Jacopo Ligozzi, il Domenico Passignano and dei Melani. The church contains the funeral monument of Marchese Francesco Del Testa by Giovanni Antonio Cybei with a portrait in marble relief (1780). The church also contains a tomb with the body of Santa Bona kept in a chapel dedicated to her.
