= San Zeno, Pisa =

Church in Pisa, Italy

Coordinates: 43.723000°N 10.407531°E

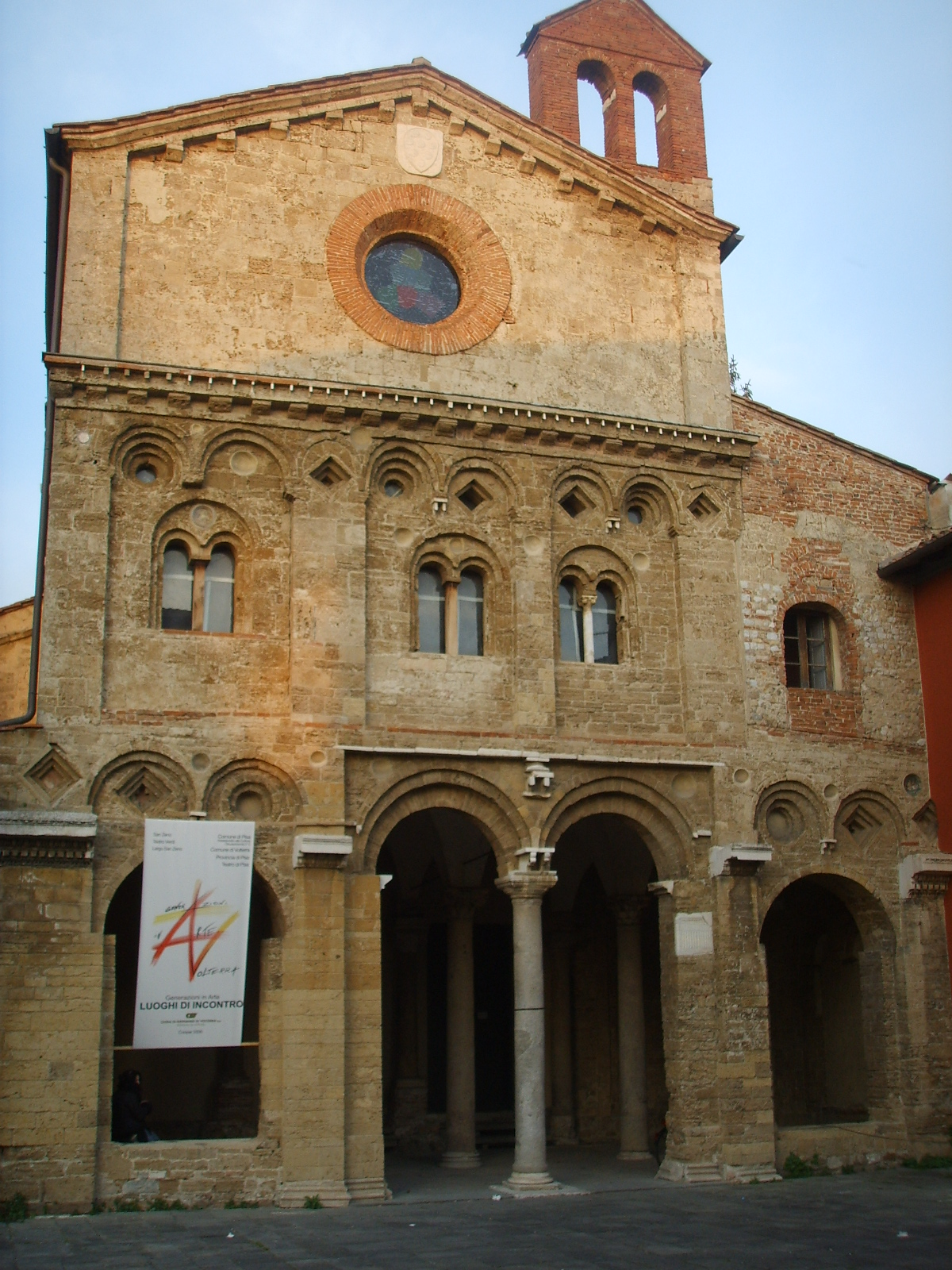
San Zeno.

San Zeno is a church and a former abbey in Pisa, Tuscany, Italy.

The church is documented going back to 1029. It was part of a monastery built over pre-existing edifices, and, until the 15th century, it had also a hospital. In the 12th century it was held by the Camaldolese monks.

The church has a nave and two aisles. The façade is preceded by a portico supported by pilasters and a central columns. The second row has mullioned windows and decorations with lozenges and small circular windows, with ceramic basins by Islamic masters (11th century; the originals are in the National Museum of San Matteo).

The interior has ancient Roman capitals and traces of medieval paintings.

== Sources ==
- Barsali, U.; U. Castelli; R. Gagetti; O. Parra (1999). Storia e Capolavori di Pisa. Florence: Bonechi.
- Donati, Roberto. Pisa. Arte e storia. Narni: Plurigraf.
